= Virginian EL-C =

American class of electric locomotive

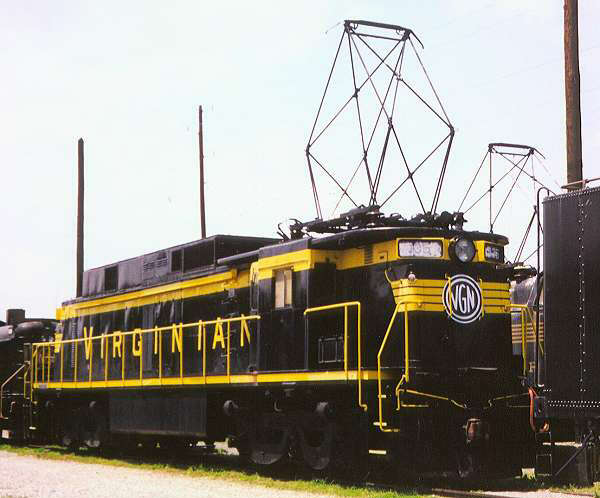
- Virginian Railway No. 135 is preserved at the Virginia Museum of Transportation
Type and origin
- Power type: Electric
- Builder: General Electric
- Build date: 1955–1957
- Total produced: 12
Specifications
- Configuration
  - AAR: C-C
  - UIC: Co′Co′
- Gauge: 4 ft 8 1/2 in (1,435 mm)
- Length: 69 ft 6 in (21.2 m)
- Loco weight: 174 short tons (158 t)
- Electric system/s: 11 kV AC 25 Hz
- Current pickup: Pantograph
- Traction motors: 6 × GE Model 752
- Loco brake: Dynamic
Performance figures
- Maximum speed: 65 mph (104.6 km/h)
- Power output: 3,300 hp (2.5 MW)
- Tractive effort
  - Starting: 98,500 lbf (438,000 N)
Career
- Operators: Virginian Railway; Norfolk and Western Railway; New York, New Haven and Hartford Railroad; Penn Central; Conrail
- Class: EL-C (VGN and N&W); EF-4 (New Haven); E33 (PC and Conrail)
- Numbers: 130–141 (VGN); 230–241 (N&W); 300–310 (New Haven); 4600–4610 (PC and Conrail)
- Disposition: Two preserved, remainder scrapped

The Virginian EL-C, later known as the New Haven EF-4 and E33, was an electric locomotive built for the Virginian Railway by General Electric in August 1955. They were the first successful production locomotives to use Ignitron (mercury arc) rectifier technology. Although they proved to be a successful design, no more EL-Cs were built, due to the small number of railroads that had electrification and the advent of improved electric locomotive technology. They were among the last mainline electric freight locomotives in the United States.

== Background ==
In the mid-1920s the Virginian Railway had adopted an 11 kV 25 Hz AC electrification for its coal-heavy main line between Mullens, West Virginia and Roanoke, Virginia. To work this line the Virginian bought 36 EL-3A boxcab locomotives from Westinghouse. The Virginian added four EL-2B locomotives from General Electric after World War II, but the original fleet was showing its age. In the mid-1950s the Virginian decided to continue electrification in lieu of dieselization, and ordered new locomotives from GE to replace the original boxcabs.

== Design ==
GE employed then-new ignitron rectifier technology, first used on the experimental Pennsylvania Railroad E2c and E3b locomotives. The rectifiers converted the overhead AC to DC. A transformer stepped the voltage down from 11 kV to feed the rectifier. The DC voltage from the rectifier was then smoothed by a reactor before it was passed on to the traction motors. There were six traction motors, one for each axle. Starting tractive effort was 98,500 lbf (438,000 N); maximum power output 3,300 hp (2,500 kW). The maximum speed of the locomotive was 65 mph (105 km/h). Each locomotive had six axles in a C-C configuration. They were 69 ft 6 in (21.2 m) long and weighed 174 short tons (158 t).

== History ==
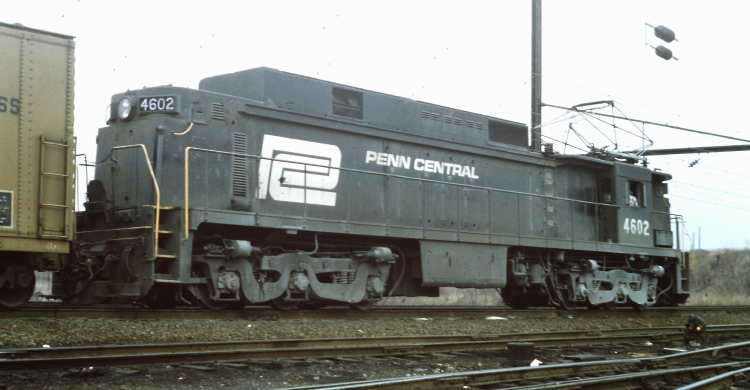
Penn Central No. 4602 near Baltimore, Maryland, in 1975

GE delivered 12 locomotives, numbered 130–141, to the Virginian between October 1956 and January 1957. The locomotives performed well in freight service and the Virginian retired the EL-3As as planned. The situation changed dramatically in December 1959 when the long-discussed merger between the Virginian and the Norfolk and Western Railway occurred. The routes were largely parallel, and the N&W had scrapped its own electrification scheme in 1950. The N&W renumbered the EL-Cs 230–241 and kept them running, but change was coming. The N&W routed only eastbound traffic over the former Virginian, with all westbound traffic going over the N&W main line. The electrification system became surplus to requirements and was shut down on June 30, 1962.

N&W rebuilt one EL-C, No. 230, as a road slug, but the experiment proved unsuccessful. In 1963 the New York, New Haven and Hartford Railroad stepped in. The New Haven was cash-strapped but in need of power to replace 1910s-era boxcabs on its electrification between New York and New Haven. The N&W sold all 12 locomotives, including the slug as a parts source, for $300,000 (equal to $3,154,891 today). The New Haven designated the locomotives EF-4 and renumbered them 300–310.

The locomotives gained their fourth owner in 1969 when the New Haven became part of Penn Central. With the change in ownership came a new designation, E33 (following the old Pennsylvania Railroad nomenclature), a renumbering to 4600–4610, and a new assignment: protecting freight schedules on the Northeast Corridor and the Philadelphia to Harrisburg Main Line. No. 4600 was wrecked and never entered service. A fifth and final change in ownership came in 1976 when the bankrupt Penn Central became part of Conrail. Retained and repainted by Conrail, all 10 E33s were retired at the end of March 1981 when Conrail shut down its electric freight operations.

== Preservation ==
Conrail sent its remaining E33s back to GE as trade-ins. Two were preserved: ex-Virginian No. 131, painted as Conrail 4601 which was at the Railroad Museum of New England (RMNE) and ex-Virginian No. 135 at the Virginia Museum of Transportation. RMNE sold No. 4601 to the Illinois Railway Museum in 2015, and the unit arrived on IRM property in 2017.
