= Page, West Virginia =

- Census-designated place (CDP)
- Location within the state of West Virginia Page (the United States)
- Coordinates: 38°3′10″N 81°16′11″W
- Country: United States
- State: West Virginia
- County: Fayette

Area
  - Total: 0.444 sq mi (1.15 km^{2})
  - Land: 0.438 sq mi (1.13 km^{2})
  - Water: 0.006 sq mi (0.016 km^{2})

Population (2020)
  - Total: 152
  - Density: 347/sq mi (134/km^{2})
- Time zone: UTC-5 (Eastern (EST))
  - Summer (DST): UTC-4 (EDT)

Page is a census-designated place (CDP) and coal town in Fayette County, West Virginia, United States. As of the 2020 census, its population was 152 (down from 224 at the 2010 census). It was named for William Nelson Page (1854–1932), a civil engineer and industrialist who lived in nearby Ansted, where he managed Gauley Mountain Coal Company and many iron, coal, and railroad enterprises.

Page owned a coal and coking company at Page and was the first president of The Virginian Railway Company (now a part of Norfolk Southern).

== William Nelson Page, coal, railroad ==
In 1896, Page founded the Loup Creek and Deepwater Railway, a logging railroad connecting a sawmill at Robson with the Chesapeake and Ohio Railway (C&O) at Deepwater on the Kanawha River. In 1898, it was rechartered as the Deepwater Railway, with plans to extend to nearby coal mines at Glen Jean. The town of Page became one of the earliest stations on the expanding Deepwater Railway. Around 1903, it also became the location of Page Coal and Coke Company.

In 1902, Page enlisted the support of millionaire industrialist Henry Huttleston Rogers as a silent partner to finance the expansion of the Deepwater Railway much further, about 80 miles through Mullens to reach the Norfolk and Western Railway (N&W) at Matoaka to open up new territory with untapped deposits of high volatile bituminous coal.

As construction of the expanded line got underway, Page was unsuccessful in negotiating fair rates with either major railroad, Thus, he and Rogers quietly expanded their plans again to build all the way to the sea, forming what became the Virginian Railway in 1907, completed all the way from Deepwater to Sewell's Point on Hampton Roads in 1909.

== Growth and decline ==
Page became the site of a switching yard, roundhouse, and station on the Virginian Railway (VGN). During the first half of the 20th century, it was a busy place. However, after the railroad eliminated steam locomotives in 1957, and the existing coal mines had been largely depleted, most of the facilities and personnel at Page were unneeded. The VGN was merged into the Norfolk and Western Railway in 1959, which itself became part of Norfolk Southern in 1982.

During the latter part of 2007, construction had begun on a 200-foot coal silo that will be fed from a ridge nearly a half mile away, along with an inter modal transport facility; however, this has not contributed to the economy of the area, as mainly non-local contractors have been used. The silo was never put into service and the mine closed in 2014, the silo remains standing and acts as a reminder of better days in the past for Page.

== Notable people ==
- Alexander K. Tyree, U.S. Navy Captain and double Navy Cross recipient
