= Virginian EL-3A =

Class of American electric locomotives

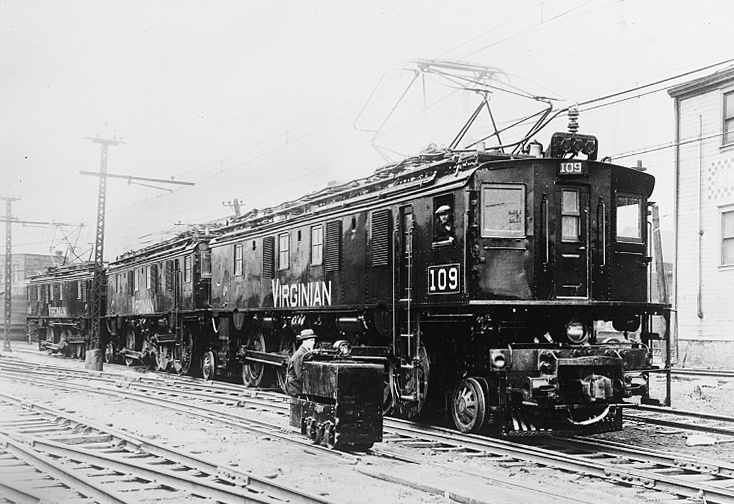
- VGN 109 in size comparison with a mining locomotive.
Type and origin
- Information is mainly about the triple-unit EL-3A locomotives
- Power type: Electric
- Builder: American Locomotive Company and Westinghouse Electric Corporation
- Build date: 1925–1926
- Total produced: 36 locomotives (10 3-unit locomotives, 6 single-unit locomotives)
Specifications
- Configuration
  - Whyte: Single unit: 2-4-4-2OE; Triple-unit: 2-4-4-2+2-4-4-2+2-4-4-2
  - AAR: Single unit: 1-B-B-1; Triple unit: 1-B-B-1+1-B-B-1+1-B-B-1
  - UIC: (1'B)–(B1')+(1'B)–(B1')+(1'B)–(B1')
- Gauge: 4 ft 8 1/2 in (1,435 mm)
- Driver dia.: 1,575 mm (5 ft 2.0 in)
- Length
  - Over couplers: 46,390 mm (152 ft 2 in)
- Service weight: 583 t (574 long tons; 643 short tons)
- Electric system/s: 11 kV AC 25 Hz
- Current pickup: Pantograph
- Traction motors: 6
Performance figures
- Maximum speed: 60 km/h (37 mph)
- Power output
  - 1 hour: 7,000 hp (5,200 kW)
- Tractive effort
  - Starting: 1,235 kN (278,000 lbf)
  - Continuous: At 23 km/h (14 mph): 600 kN (130,000 lbf); At 46 km/h (29 mph): 300 kN (67,000 lbf)
Career
- Operators: Virginian Railway
- Numbers: EL-3A: 100-109; EL-1A: 110-115; Individual units: EL-1-EL-36
- Retired: 1959
- Disposition: All scrapped

The Virginian Railway EL-3A was a class of 11 kV 25 Hz AC electric locomotives built for coal haulage over the electrified Elmore to Roanoke route. They were some of the largest and most powerful locomotives at the time when they were delivered.

== History ==
According to Westinghouse, the contract for the electrification of the 133.6 miles (215.0 km) long section through the Allegheny Mountains was the world's largest railroad electrification scheme at the time. The contract, costing 15 million US dollars, includes the installation of the necessary infrastructure, as well as the delivery of 36 locomotives. 30 of these were coupled into 10 semi-permanent triple-units classified as the EL-3A, while the remaining six locomotives were designated as the single-unit EL-1A. Each individual unit was numbered EL-1 to EL-36.

The first of the triple-unit locomotives were built at Westinghouse's Pittsburgh plant in 1925. Electric services commenced on September 14, 1925, on the western side of the Allegheny Mountains from Elmore to Clark's Gap, with electrification reaching Princeton on October 1, and to Roanoke on September 16, 1926.

Two EL-3A sets, one at each end, hauled 6,000 short tons (5,443 t; 5,357 long tons) trains over the 21-‰ grade from Elmore to Clarks Gap at 23 km/h (14 mph). On the 6-‰ grade section between Whitethorne and Merrimac, traction was sufficient to handle 9,000 short tons (8,165 t; 8,036 long tons) trains. Electric operations doubled the capacity on the line because they could handle the 21 ‰ grade twice as fast as steam locomotives, which could only haul 5,500 short tons (4,990 t; 4,911 long tons) at 11 mph (18 km/h) over the same stretch of track. On downhill trips, the regenerative braking the locomotives were fitted not only reduced wear and tear, but also saved up to 15,000 MWh of energy per year.

The ten triple-unit EL-3A locomotives, nicknamed by staff as Squareheads, took over operations from 48 Mallet locomotives. Although the EL-3A locomotives were twice as expensive to purchase as a steam locomotive of comparable power, the former required significantly less maintenance, thereby additional costs were justified. Steam locomotives could only be used to haul trains half the time because of lengthy periods of steaming up, had to be turned around at destinations, and requiring intensive maintenance, while the electric locomotives were available to haul trains most of the time.

In 1948, the EL-3A locomotives were supplemented by four EL-2B locomotives due to increased traffic volumes, and 1955 by 12 EL-C locomotives. The EL-3A remained in service, until being retired in 1959. The Norfolk and Western Railway, who had absorbed the Virginian, shut down electric operations in 1962.

== Design ==
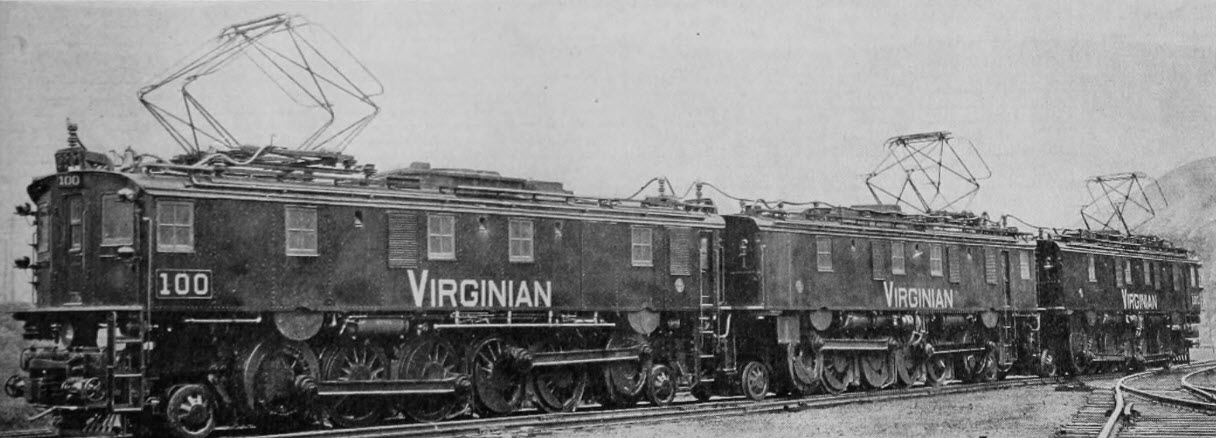
First of the EL-3A locomotives at Westinghouse, Pittsburgh

An EL-3A locomotive consisted of three sections connected by semi-permanent couplings and could be operated from one driver's cab. The control circuits would also have allowed multiple control of four sections, but this was not used in practice. Each section has the ability of operating independently. The electrical components were supplied by Westinghouse, while the carbody construction was sourced from ALCO. Each section had a boxcab-style body shell, which, without transmitting any traction, were mounted on two bogies, each of which contained four driving wheels and two trailing wheels.

The drive was via connecting rods that were connected to the jackshaft, located between the pilot wheels and the first pair of driving wheels. This was equipped with radially sprung cranks, which were driven by a three-phase induction motor in Dahlander circuit with slip ring rotor.

The locomotive was designed as a converter locomotive, in which the single-phase alternating current fed from the overhead catenary was converted into three-phase electric power through motor-generators, which was then used to feed the traction motors. The induction motors were designed as an asynchronous single-armature converter, also called a gap converter, and had a starting device.

The current from the overhead wires was fed via a pantograph to an oil-cooled main transformer, which minimalized the voltage. The cooling circuit of the transformer was equipped with a forced circulation and a forced-ventilation cooler. The converter was connected to the secondary side of the transformer, which converted the single-phase energy into three-phase electric power to supply the traction motors. The locomotive had only two continuous speeds (23 and 46 km/h (14 and 29 mph)), which were achieved by the pole switching of the traction motors. The start was carried out using a liquid starter connected to the slip ring circuit of the asynchronous motor, where the level of the electrolyte was controlled by the engineer from a control stand in the locomotive's cab.

When descending downhill, regenerative braking was automatically activated without any intervention from the driver and without changing the circuit. Driven by the wheels, the asynchronous motors began to work as generators as soon as their speed exceeded the synchronous speed of the motor, and the generated electricity was fed back into the overhead line via the converter. The braking power was as great as the drive power, so that a train could be kept at a constant speed of 15 mph (24 km/h) when travelling downhill without using air brakes, which could be used to bring the train to a stop.

== Bibliography ==
- Staples, E.I. (June 1925). "The First Virginian Electric Locomotive". Railway and Locomotive Engineering. 38 (6).
- Swezey, Kenneth M. (February 1932). "Is the Iron Horse Doomed?". Popular Science. pp. 132–133.
- EuDaly, Kevin (2014). "The Electric Virginian / Virginians New Electrics meet all requirements". The Arrow. Vol. 30, no. 3.
- Sachs, Karl (2013) [1928]. "Vierter Teil Umformerlokomotiven Einleitung A PhasenumformerLokomotiven" [Fourth Part Converter Locomotives Introduction A Phase Converter Locomotives]. Elektrische Vollbahnlokomotiven [Electric mainline locomotives] (in German). Springer-Verlag. ISBN 9783642518478.
- Lovell, Alfred H. (March 1924). "Recent Developments in Heavy Electric Traction". The Michigan Technic. 37: 19–20.
- Solomon, Brian; Yough, Patrick (July 15, 2009). Coal Trains: The History of Railroading and Coal in the United States. Voyageur Press. ISBN 9781616731373.
