= Virginian Railway class PA =

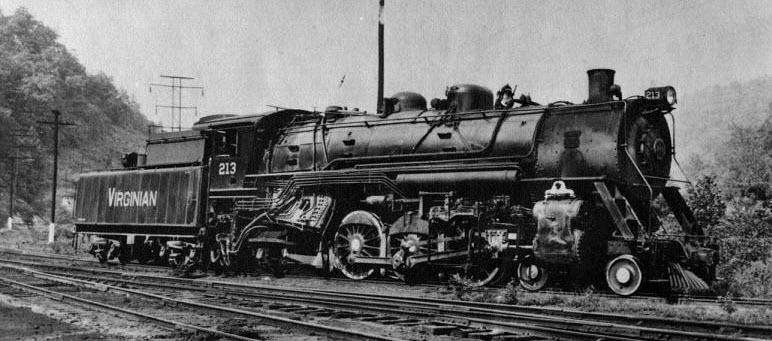
Type and origin
- Power type: Steam
- Builder: ALCO-Richmond
- Serial number: 61992-61997
- Build date: 1920
- Total produced: 6
Specifications
- Configuration
  - Whyte: 4-6-2
  - UIC: 2′C1′
- Gauge: 4 ft 8 1/2 in (1,435 mm)
- Wheelbase: 34.75 ft (417.0 in; 10,590 mm; 1,059 cm)
- Boiler
  - Diameter: 69 in (5.8 ft; 1,800 mm; 180 cm)
- Boiler pressure: 190 psi (1.3×10^{9} mPa; 1,300 kPa)
- Cylinder size: 26 in × 28 in (660 mm × 710 mm)
- Valve gear: Baker
Performance figures
- Tractive effort: 46,634 lbf (207.44 kN)
- Factor of adh.: 4.05
Career
- Operators: Virginian Railway (VGN)
- Class: PA
- Numbers: 210-215
- Retired: 1957
- Scrapped: 1957-1960
- Disposition: All scrapped

The Virginian Railway class PA was a class of six 4-6-2 "Pacific" type steam locomotives that were built by the American Locomotive Company (ALCO) at Richmond Works originally for the Virginian Railway (VGN) in 1920.

== History ==
In 1920, the American Locomotive Company (ALCO) built six locomotives at their Richmond Works between September and October, and delivered them to the Virginian Railway (VGN) and numbered 210 through 215 by the Virginian Railway. The first five locomotives, nos. 210 through 214, were built in September 1920, and the sixth locomotive, no. 215, was built in October 1920. All six were fitted with two cross-compound air pumps under the left running board and Duplex stokers.

The six locomotives were built to haul the Virginian's passenger trains, including runs between Roanoke and Norfolk, Virginia, and continued to operate on the Virginian Railway until being retired in 1957, and all six were scrapped between 1957 and 1960.

== Fleet numbers ==
Road number	Built date	Serial number	First run date	Retirement date	Disposition
210	September 1920	61992	1920	1957	Scrapped
211	September 1920	61993	1920	1957	Scrapped
212	September 1920	61994	1920	1957	Scrapped in January 1960
213	September 1920	61995	1920	1957	Scrapped
214	September 1920	61996	1920	1957	Scrapped in January 1957
215	October 1920	61997	1920	1957	Scrapped

== Bibliography ==
- Drury, George H. (1993). Guide to North American Steam Locomotives. Waukesha, Wisconsin: Kalmbach Publishing Company. ISBN 0-89024-206-2. LCCN 93041472.
- Archer, William R. (2007). The Virginian Railway. Arcadia Publishing. ISBN 978-0-7385-5274-3.
