= H. Reid =

American historian

Harold A. Reid (1925–1992), also known by the pen name H. Reid, was an American writer, photographer, and historian. His photographs of steam locomotives, captured the last days of steam motive power on America's Class I railroads, notably on the Virginian Railway, and ending with the Norfolk and Western in 1960, the last major U.S. railroad to convert from steam.

In The Virginian Railway, published in 1961, Reid combined photography with a storytelling style and depth of facts, recording the "Richest Little Railroad in the World" before it merged in 1959.

== Childhood, education, and marriage ==
Reid grew up with the railroad. His childhood home in Norfolk, Virginia was adjacent to the massive Lamberts Point facilities with general merchandise and coal piers of the Norfolk and Western Railway (N&W). Author Lloyd D. Lewis, who was a child when he first met Reid, relates that "H" (as he preferred to be called) printed a small newspaper for his neighbors as a child.

Reid attended Elon College (now Elon University) in Elon, North Carolina and graduated from the College of William and Mary of Williamsburg, Virginia.

He and his wife Virginia (née Ewell) Reid lived in Norfolk near the Virginian Railway (VGN) tracks leading to Sewell's Point.

== Newspaperman, author, and railfan ==
Reid was a newspaperman by trade and worked a brief time in public relations for the local Norfolk County Public Schools in what is now the City of Chesapeake. He began honing his art with black and white photography with a Brownie box camera when he was a child in the 1930s. Black and white remained his favored medium even as color photography became popular in the 1950s. He contributed articles and photographs to Trains magazine, published by Kalmbach, and his work was noted by its longtime editor David P. Morgan.

Following a long friendship with the assistant to the general manager of the coal-hauling Virginian Railway, after that company's merger into the N&W in 1959, Reid wrote his epoch work, The Virginian Railway, which was published by Kalmbach in 1961. The book combined his photography with a storytelling style with facts. Reprinted three times, first and second editions of The Virginian Railway have become valued as collectible items.

Reid's other published work include contributions to Trains Magazine, and two other books, Extra South, (1964), published by Starucca Valley Publishing, and Rails Through Dixie, written with Johnny Krause (1965), published by Golden West Books. His photography work has been featured in many other publications, notably several by Lloyd D. Lewis, including The Virginian Era (1992), Virginian Railway Locomotives (1993), and Norfolk and Western and Virginian Railways in Color by H. Reid (1994), all published by TLC Publishing of Lynchburg, Virginia. His photographs have been published in many other books.

== Photography ==
Author Lewis describes Reid as a "consummate artist of the black & white image." At a time when many rail photographers concentrated on still photos taken from front and side profiles, Reid created unusual shots. Taken from above and below, his photographs often included scenery or surrounding features in the genre described in depth in author Leo Marx's 1964 book The Machine in the Garden.

Reid's travels in search of rail subjects took him to sites as far from Hampton Roads as Louisiana, New England, and the Hudson River Valley in New York. The hobby of rail photography was still emerging, and Reid occasionally slept in logging camps and rose early to catch the work of steam locomotives on the short line railroads which were the last bastion of steam in the United States.

== Death ==
Reid died in 1992, aged 67.
