= Deep Water, West Virginia =

- Census-designated place
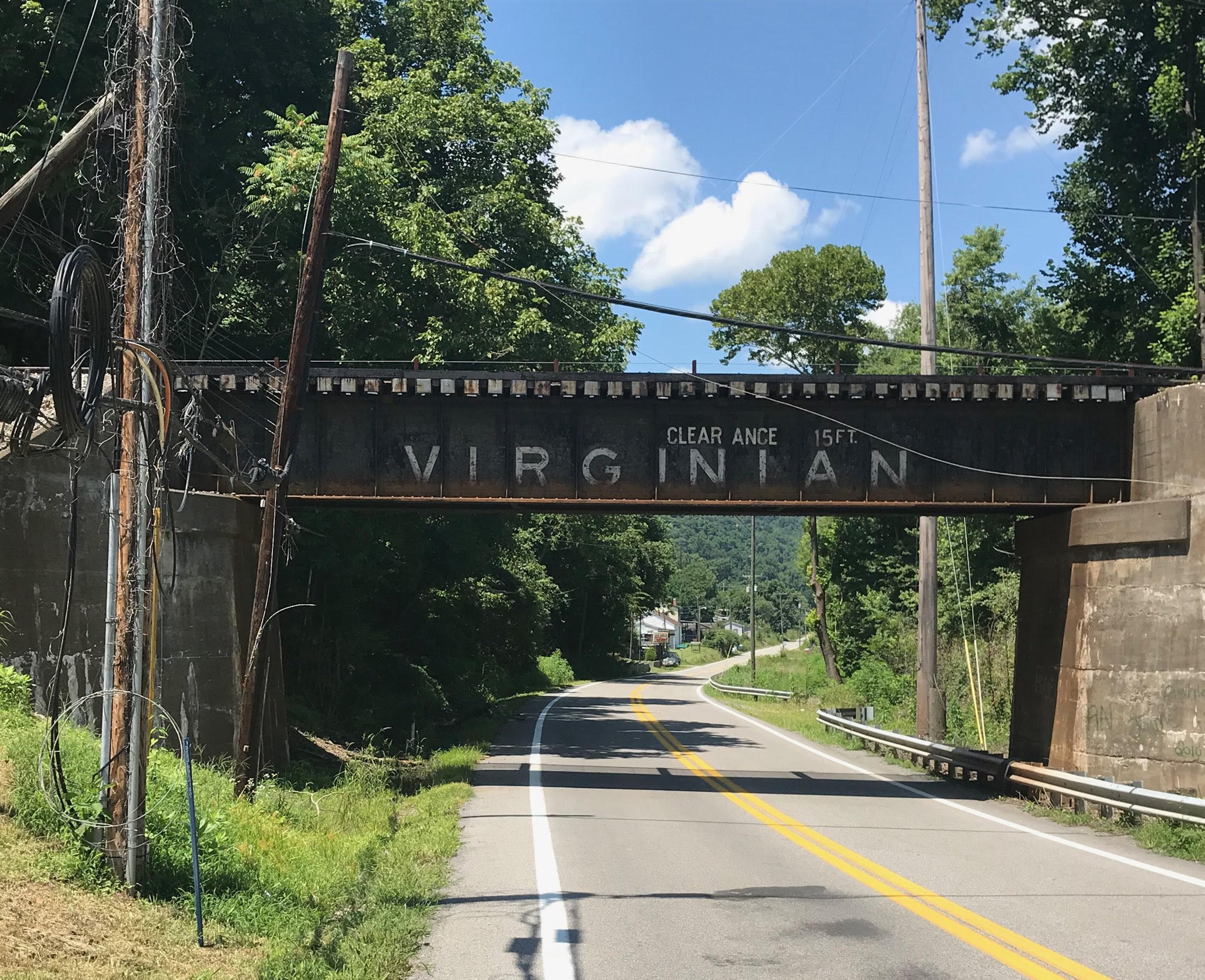
- Virginian Railway bridge in Deepwater

- Location within the state of West Virginia Deep Water (the United States)
- Coordinates: 38°7′36″N 81°15′49″W
- Country: United States
- State: West Virginia
- County: Fayette

Area
  - Total: 0.993 sq mi (2.57 km^{2})
  - Land: 0.882 sq mi (2.28 km^{2})
  - Water: 0.111 sq mi (0.29 km^{2})

Population (2020)
  - Total: 183
  - Density: 207/sq mi (80.1/km^{2})
- Time zone: UTC-5 (Eastern (EST))
  - Summer (DST): UTC-4 (EDT)
- ZIP codes: 25057
- GNIS feature ID: 1554279

Deep Water, also known historically as Deepwater, is a census-designated place on the Kanawha River in Fayette County, West Virginia, United States. As of the 2020 census, its population was 183 (down from 280 at the 2010 census). It is best known as the starting point of the Deepwater Railway founded in 1898 by William N. Page, which was merged to create the Virginian Railway in 1907.

Located near the head of navigation of the Kanawha River just a short distance downstream from Kanawha Falls, it may have been named for that reason. However, according to local legend, as recounted by H. Reid in The Virginian Railway (Kalmbach, 1961), it was named by Squire James Galsepy Kincaid and other locals on a rainy day in 1871 as a commentary on the standing groundwater outside the new post office along Loup Creek.
