= Tidewater Railway =

Railway in Virginia

The Tidewater Railway, also known as the Tidewater Railway Company, was formed in 1904 as an intrastate railroad in Virginia, in the United States, by William N. Page, a civil engineer and entrepreneur, and his silent partner, millionaire industrialist Henry Huttleston Rogers of Standard Oil fame. It was put together with the intention of creating an outlet to Hampton Roads, where coal mined along their older West Virginia short-line railroad, the Deepwater Railway, could be exported. In 1906, Thomas Davis Ranson served as vice president.

In 1907, the Tidewater Railway was renamed the "Virginian Railway". A short time later, the Virginian Railway acquired its sister, the Deepwater Railway. Before the Tidewater division of the Virginian was linked to the Deepwater line, it played an important role, in conjunction with the regional Norfolk and Southern Railway, in transporting thousands of people to the Jamestown Exposition of 1907, an event marking the three-hundredth anniversary of the founding of the British colony at Jamestown. It took two years to complete, but in 1909, both portions (the Tidewater portion and the Deepwater portion) were finally completed, and coal exports, from a new coal pier at Sewell's Point, began.

In 1959, the Virginian Railway was merged with the Norfolk and Western Railway. This was the first major U.S. railroad merger of the last half of the twentieth century, an era of rampant mergers, acquisitions, and consolidations among the American railroads.
