= Virginia Museum of Transportation =

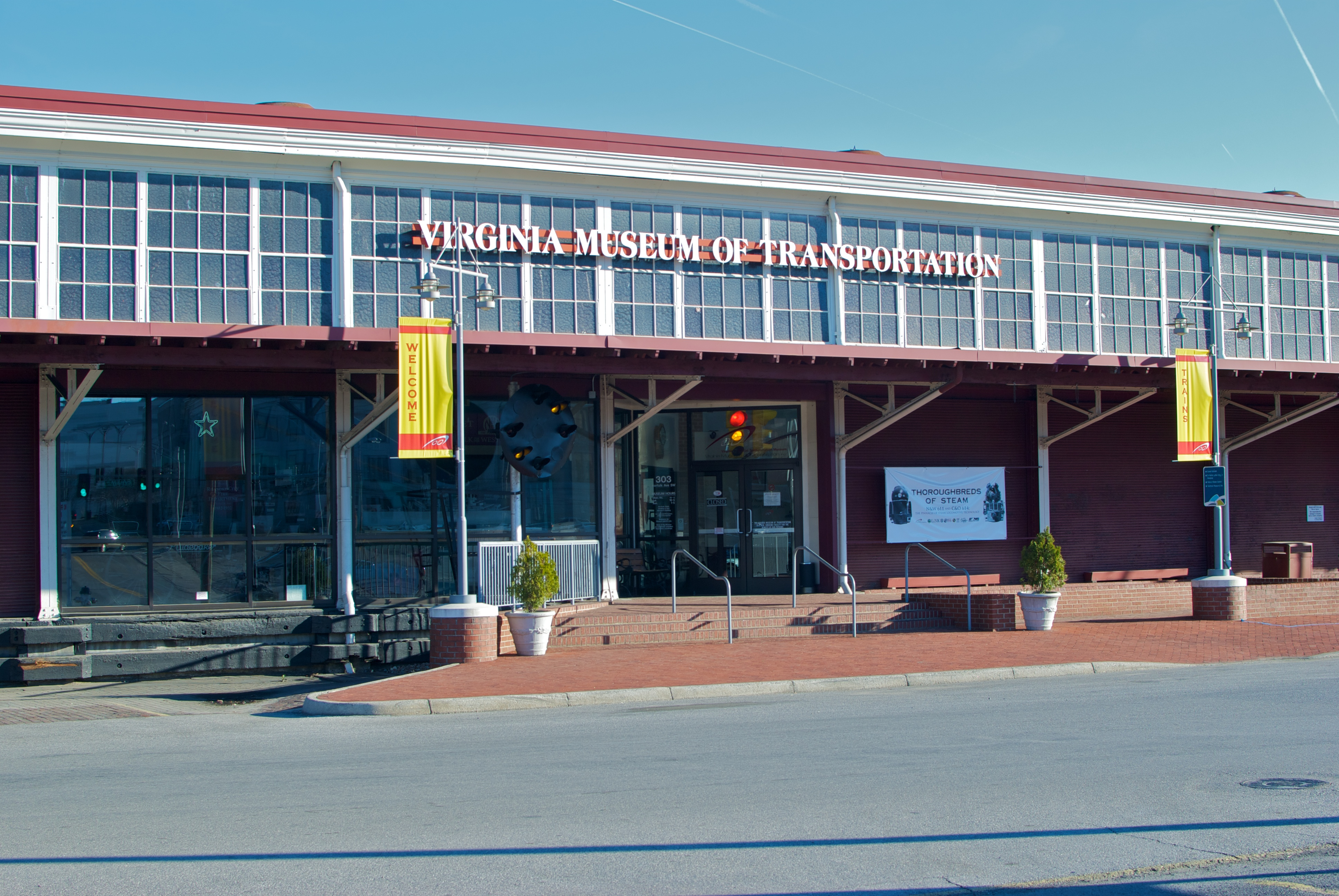
- The entrance of the Virginia Museum of Transportation

- Location within the United States
- Established: April 1986
- Location: Roanoke, Virginia
- Coordinates: 37.272943°N 79.947231°W
- Type: Transport museum
- Website: Official website
- Norfolk and Western Railway Freight Station
- U.S. National Register of Historic Places
- Virginia Landmarks Register
- Location within Virginia Location within the United States
- Location: 303 Norfolk Ave, Roanoke, Virginia
- Coordinates: 37°16′23″N 79°56′46″W
- Area: 57.7 acres (23.4 ha)
- Built: c. 1918
- Built by: Norfolk and Western Railway
- NRHP reference No.: 12000969

Significant dates
- Added to NRHP: November 21, 2012
- Designated VLR: September 20, 2012

The Virginia Museum of Transportation (VMT) is a museum in downtown Roanoke, Virginia, that is devoted to the topic of transportation.

== History ==
The Virginia Museum of Transportation began in 1963 as the Roanoke Transportation Museum in Wasena Park in Roanoke, Virginia. The museum was initially housed in an old Norfolk & Western Railway freight depot on the banks of the Roanoke River. The earliest components of the museum's collection included a United States Army Jupiter rocket and the J class steam locomotive No. 611, donated by Norfolk & Western to the city of Roanoke, where many of its engines were built. The museum added other pieces of rail equipment, including a DC Transit PCC streetcar; and a number of horse-drawn vehicles, including a hearse, a covered wagon, and a Studebaker wagon. In 1983, it earned the title as the Official Transportation Museum of Virginia by the General Assembly of Virginia.

In November 1985, a flood damaged the museum and much of its collection. In April 1986, the museum was re-opened at the former Norfolk & Western Railway Freight Station in downtown Roanoke as the Virginia Museum of Transportation. Under the museum's original charter, Norfolk & Western steam locomotives No. 611 and No. 1218 were property of the city of Roanoke. On April 2, 2012, during VMT's 50 Birthday, the city transferred ownership of the locomotives to the museum.

The Norfolk & Western Railway Freight Station was listed on the National Register of Historic Places in 2012. The station consists of two clearly identifiable sections, both of which were completed in 1918. They are the two-story, 50-bay freight station which was built parallel to the railroad tracks and now is oriented south, and the one-story-with-basement brick annex that formerly housed the offices of the Shenandoah and Radford divisions of the Norfolk & Western. The building closed for railroad freight business in 1964.

When the station opened, it replaced several older depots and included an annex for the railway's freight-accounting and billing staff.

== Galleries and exhibits ==
=== Automobile gallery ===
- Auto Gallery. This gallery features automobiles from the early 20th century to the present day. Many of the museum's antique automobiles are displayed here, illustrating the development of automotive design and technology over time. An oral history display titled "Driving Lessons" presents stories from individuals associated with American car culture.

The museum also hosts occasional special exhibitions in the automobile gallery, such as the Hollywood Star Cars exhibit, which showcased vehicles featured in television programs and films.

=== Railroad exhibits ===
Ongoing exhibits cover various aspects of railroad history in the United States, with a particular focus on Virginia.

- The Claytor Brothers – Virginians Building America's Railroad. This exhibit examines the careers of Graham and Robert Claytor and their roles in the railroad industry, including developments that led to the merger of the Norfolk & Western and Southern railways.
- From Cotton to Silk: African American Railroad Workers on the Norfolk & Western and Norfolk Southern Railways. This exhibit originated from an oral history project supported in part by businesses and residents of the Roanoke area. It documents the contributions of African American railroad workers through photographs, artifacts, and recorded interviews.
- Big Lick. This exhibit recreates a rural train depot from the 1930s. It includes freight scales, a telegrapher's office, timetables, and a velocipede handcar used for track maintenance. The exhibit also provides a brief history of the Norfolk & Western Freight Station, which houses the Virginia Museum of Transportation.

The museum maintains an O scale model railroad layout representing the rail networks of Roanoke, Salem, and Lynchburg, Virginia.

=== Aviation gallery ===
- Wings Over Virginia. This exhibit explores the history of aviation in Virginia. An accompanying oral history project, "Flight Talk," features recorded stories from aviation figures, covering developments from the early years of aviation through modern flight and space exploration.

== Collection ==
From January 20 to May 3, 2011, the museum was home to Chesapeake and Ohio 614 as part of the museum's Thoroughbreds of Steam exhibit.

Other pieces include automobiles such as a 1913 Metz, a 1920 Buick touring car, a Highway Post Office Bus, and an armored car used to showcase the United States Bill of Rights in 1991.

=== Rolling stock ===
The collection includes more than 50 pieces of rolling stock. Some may be closed to the public for restoration, and some in need of heavy restoration are stored offsite in yards managed by Norfolk Southern.

==== Steam ====
- Norfolk & Western J Class #611. Operational since May 9, 2015.
- Norfolk & Western Class A #1218. Built at the Roanoke Shops in 1943, used in excursion service from 1987 to 1991, it is the last remaining 2-6-6-4.
- Virginian Railway SA class #4 steam locomotive. Built by Baldwin Locomotive Works in 1910, it is the last remaining steam engine from the Virginian Railway.
- Norfolk & Western Class M2c #1151
- Norfolk & Western Class G-1 #6. Built in 1897 by Baldwin, it is the museum's oldest piece of equipment and one of the oldest Norfolk and Western locomotives still in existence.
- Celanese Porter Fireless Locomotive #1
- EJ Lavino Company #34, 0–6–0
- Nickel Plate Road #763. Sold to Age of Steam Roundhouse Museum in Sugarcreek, Ohio, in 2007
- Chesapeake & Ohio Class H-8 #1604. Transferred to the B&O Railroad Museum in 1986
- Norfolk & Western 2156. The sole survivor of the Y6 class, it was on five-year loan from the National Museum of Transportation in St. Louis, Missouri between 2015 and 2020.

==== Electric ====
- Virginian Railway EL-C #135
- Pennsylvania Railroad GG1 #4919. Painted in Brunswick green, it currently lacks pinstripes and keystones.
- D.C. Transit Company PCC Streetcar. Sold to National Capital Trolley Museum in 2020, it is slated for operational restoration.
- Panama Canal Mule #686. Cosmetically restored by the Roanoke Chapter of the NRHS in 2020.

==== Diesel-electric ====
- Wheeling & Lake Erie Switcher EMD NW2 #D3. Donated by Celanese Corporation.
- Mead Paper Industrial switcher #200
- Southern GM EMD FTB Unit
- Virginia Central Porter Rod Driven #3
- Chesapeake Western Baldwin #662. Cosmetically restored by the Roanoke Chapter NRHS in 2012.
- Norfolk & Western ALCO RS-3 #300
- Chesapeake Western ALCO T-6 #10
- Norfolk & Western EMD GP-9 #521
- Norfolk & Western ALCO C-630 #1135
- Norfolk & Western EMD SD-45 #1776. Cosmetically restored by Norfolk Southern Chattanooga shops and returned to Roanoke.
- Blue Ridge Stone Whitcomb Switcher
- Nickel Plate Road EMD GP-9 #532, donated to Roanoke Chapter of the NRHS.
- Southern (Ex-Central of Georgia) EMD SD-7 #197 Sold to Southern Appalachia Railway Museum
- Conrail SDP-45 #6670, built as Erie Lackawanna Railroad #3639. Stored offsite
- Wabash E8A #1009. Cosmetically restored by Norfolk Southern. 1009 is EMD's 10,000th Locomotive Ever Built
- Richmond, Fredericksburg & Potomac E8A #1002. Stored offsite, stripped of body panels.
- AEP #2, GE SL144 (VMTX 70). Painted in Virginia Tech colors
- Seaboard System EMD SW1200 #2289 sold to Southern Appalachia Railway Museum
- Norfolk Southern slug #9914. Ex-Virginian Railway FM Trainmaster turned into a slug unit, stored offsite

==== Freight cars ====
- Amoco Oil ARA 111 tank car AMOX #9465
- Depressed center flatcar APWX #1002
- RF&P boxcar #2305
- Trailer Train flatcar with Sea Land containers #470534
- Derrick tender flatcar # 590374 and Derrick #514925. Crane scrapped in 2017, flatcar stored offsite
- Virginian Railway hopper car #107768, stored offsite.
- Steam crane #527665 with boom car #514902. Crane scrapped in 2017, flatcar stored offsite.
- Virginian Railway 250-ton wrecking derrick B-37 #40037,
- Southern Railway boxcar #33348
- Southern Railway Big John hopper #8638
- Norfolk Southern flatcar. Used as a stage for events
- 3 Norfolk & Western hopper cars. Saved from Virginia Scrap and Iron
- Norfolk Southern hopper car #23760. 25,000th rebodied car from Roanoke shops
- Ex-Norfolk Southern Burro crane
- Steam-era Norfolk & Western steam crane #514908. Stored offsite
- VMTX 200298. coal gondola for 611
- VMTX 200340. coal gondola for 611
- VMTX 66538. coal gondola for 611

==== Passenger cars ====
- Illinois Terminal "President One" business car
- Norfolk & Western baggage car #1418. Stored offsite
- Norfolk Southern MOW dining car #999000. Sold to private owner
- Southern Railway Pullman sleeping car "Lake Pearl" #2422. in primer, lacking Southern Railway paint
- Southern Railway Coach "W. Graham Claytor, Jr." Car #1070, stored offsite
- Norfolk & Western Jim Crow Car #1662, stored offsite
- VMTX (RF&P) passenger car #513
- VMTX (RF&P) passenger car #514 (Open window car)
- VMTX (RF&P) passenger car #524
- VMTX 9647, former CN baggage car, 611/1218 tool car

==== Cabooses ====
- Norfolk and Western Class CF #518302 (Can be rented for Birthday parties)
- Virginian Class C-10 #321
- Nickel Plate Class C-7 Bay Window #470

==== Other unique rolling stock ====
- Norfolk & Western Dynamometer Car #514780
- Norfolk & Western M-1 Post Office Car #93
- Norfolk & Western Safety Instruction Car #418. A Theatre car that shows a 1983 documentary produced by Norfolk Southern titled "Going Home" about the restoration of the N&W 611.
- Norfolk & Western Tool Car #9647
- Norfolk Southern Research Car #31
- VMTX N&W Auxiliary Tender #250001

=== Automobile collection ===
==== Automobiles ====
- Oldsmobile Curved Dash (1904)
- Piedmont Touring Car (1923)
- Ford Model T Depot Hack (1925)
- Willys-Overland Whippet (1928)
- Cadillac Fleetwood Coupe (1936)
- Siebert Ford Combo Ambulance/Hearse (1936)
- Packard Super Eight (1948)
- Studebaker Land Cruiser (1950)
- Studebaker President Speedster (1955)
- DeSoto Fireflight Sportsman (1957)
- Studebaker Lark (1962)
- Chevrolet Impala (1963)
- Chevrolet Corvair Monza (1965)
- Oldsmobile Cutlass Supreme SX (1970)
- Volkswagen Beetle (1972) -COMING SOON
- Mercedes-Benz 450 SL (1976)
- DMC DeLorean (1981)
- Ford Mustang GLX Convertible (1983)
- DuPont Chevrolet Monte Carlo (1993). A Jeff Gordon car from the 2003 Warner Brothers movie Looney Tunes: Back in Action.

==== Trucks ====
- Ford Pickup Truck (1929)
- Overnite B-Model Mack Tractor (1960) and Fruehauf Trailer, on loan from UPS Corporation.
- Concord Fire Department Oren Fire Truck
- Dodge Cab Over Truck
- Jeep Oren Industrial Fire Truck
- 1962 GMC Arlington Barcroft & Washington No. 1319 New Look Bus, on Loan from Commonwealth Coach and Trolley Museum.

==== Other road vehicles ====
- Extended Roof Rockaway Carriage
- Studebaker Half-Platform Wagon (1870)
- Howe Fire Engine (1882)
- James Cunningham, Son and Company Hearse (1895)
- Freight Wagon "Prairie Schooner" (1900–1915)
- F-20 McCormick-Deering Farmall Tractor (1936)
- Federal Aviation Administration Tucker Sno-Cat

=== Aviation collection ===
After a storm in 2006, the aviation gallery was rebuilt into a collection of interviews and first hand collections, including:

- Technology of how a plane flies
- Walk-through of the fuselage of a private jet, passenger compartment and cockpit
- Helicopters and emergency transport
- Women in aviation
- Careers in aviation
- Cutting-edge research and development
- Virginia's military bases
- Roanoke's early civilian and military aviators

== See also ==
- O. Winston Link Museum
- Science Museum of Western Virginia
- Taubman Museum of Art
