= Deepwater Railway =

Short line railroad in West Virginia, United States

The Deepwater Railway was an intrastate short line railroad located in West Virginia in the United States which operated from 1898 to 1907.

William N. Page, a civil engineer and entrepreneur, had begun a small logging railroad in Fayette County in 1896, sometimes called the Loup Creek and Deepwater Railway. It extended from an interchange at Deep Water with the Chesapeake and Ohio Railway (C&O) on the south bank of the navigable Kanawha River 4 miles (6.4 km) up a steep grade into the mountainous terrain southward, following the winding Loup Creek to reach a sawmill at Robson which was owned by the Loup Creek Estate. It was operated by the C&O under a verbal agreement.

In 1898, the Deepwater Railway was incorporated, and an extension was planned to reach nearby coal deposits at Page. In 1902, assisted by silent partner, millionaire industrialist Henry H. Rogers of Standard Oil fame, Page expanded his plans, first to extend further in West Virginia to Matoaka. In 1907, the Deepwater Railway was acquired by its sister Tidewater Railway to form the Virginian Railway.
