= Virginian Railway =

Defunct American railroad

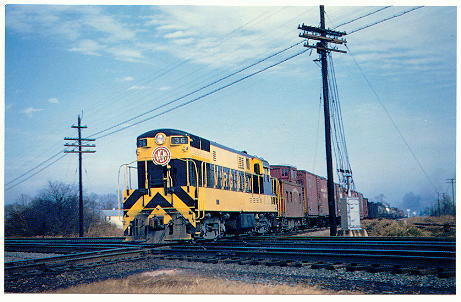
- VGN 36 Fairbanks-Morse H-16-44 diesel locomotive crossing the diamond with Norfolk & Western Railway at South Norfolk, VA

Overview
- Headquarters: Norfolk, Virginia
- Reporting mark: VGN
- Locale: Deepwater, West Virginia – Norfolk, Virginia
- Dates of operation: 1907–1959
- Successor: Norfolk and Western

Technical
- Track gauge: 4 ft 8 1/2 in (1,435 mm) standard gauge

The Virginian Railway (reporting mark VGN) was a Class I railroad located in Virginia and West Virginia in the United States. The VGN was created to transport high quality "smokeless" bituminous coal from southern West Virginia to port at Hampton Roads.

== History ==
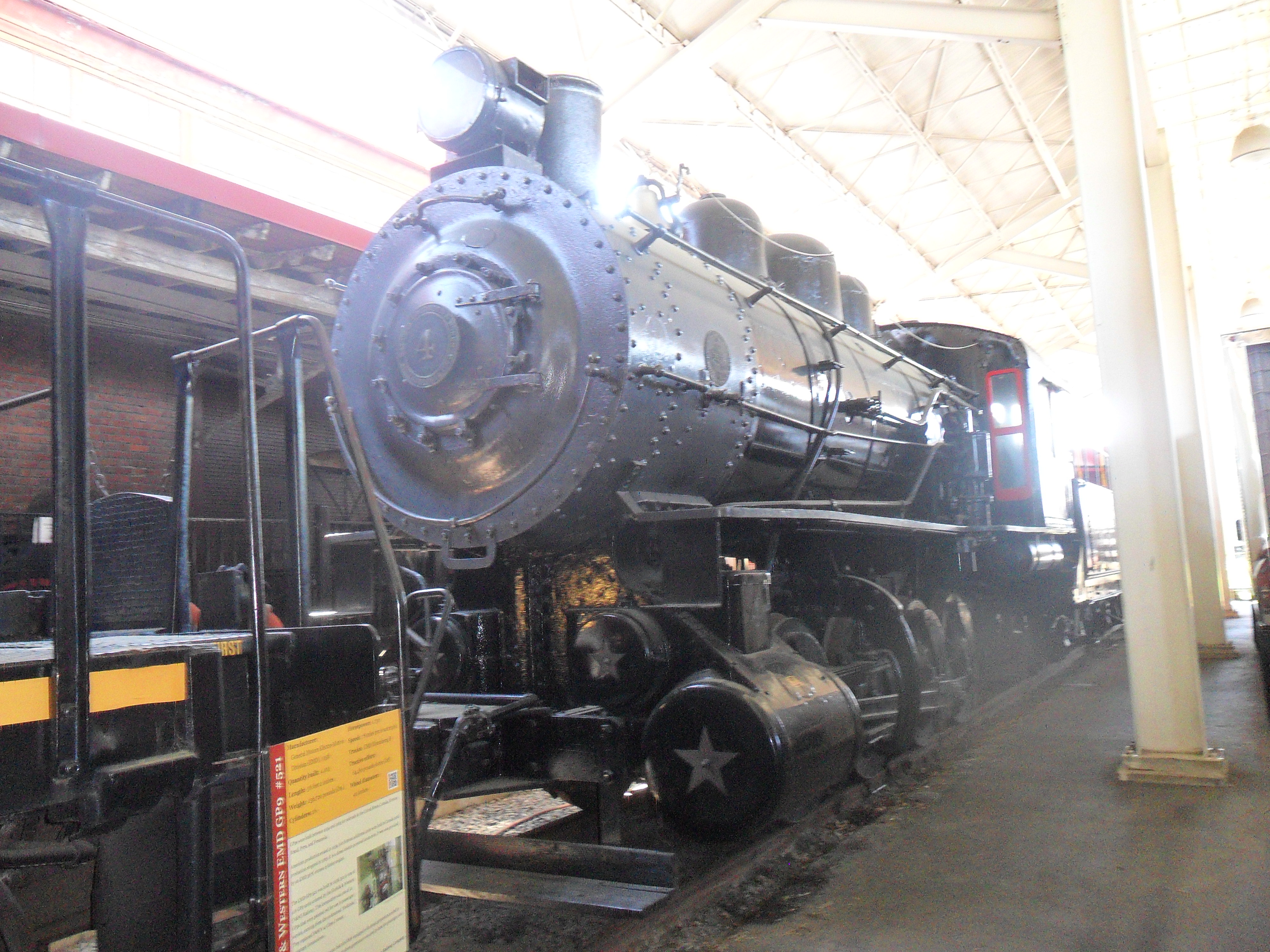
Virginian 4, the last surviving steam engine of the Virginian Railway, on display at the Virginia Museum of Transportation in Roanoke, Virginia. Built by baldwin in 1910 Retired: 1957

Early in the 20th century, William Nelson Page, a civil engineer and coal mining manager, joined forces with a silent partner, industrialist financier Henry Huttleston Rogers (a principal of Standard Oil and one of the wealthiest men in the world), to develop the Deepwater Railway, a modest 85-mile long short line railroad to access untapped bituminous coal reserves in some of the most rugged sections of southern West Virginia. When Page was blocked by collusion of the bigger railroads, who refused to grant reasonable rates to interchange the coal traffic, he did not quit. As he continued building the original project, to provide their own link, using Rogers' resources and attorneys they quietly incorporated another intrastate railroad in Virginia, the Tidewater Railway. In this name, they secured the right-of-way needed all the way across Virginia to reach Hampton Roads, where a new coal pier was erected at Sewell's Point.

The two projects were legally joined and renamed the Virginian Railway in early 1907. Despite efforts to stop them, they then built the "Mountains to Sea" railroad under the noses of the big railroads and the elite group of a few industrialists (so-called "robber barons") who controlled them. Completed in 1909, the Virginian Railway was largely financed with Rogers' personal fortune. It was a modern, well-engineered railroad with all-new infrastructure and could operate more efficiently than its larger competitors.

Throughout a profitable 50-year history, VGN continued the Page-Rogers philosophy of "paying up front for the best." It achieved best efficiencies in the mountains, rolling piedmont, and flat tidewater terrain. Known for operating some of the largest and best steam, electric, and diesel motive power, it was nicknamed "Richest Little Railroad in the World." Merged into the Norfolk and Western Railway in 1959, a large portion of the former VGN remains in service in the 21st century for the Norfolk Southern Railway, a Class I railroad headquartered in Atlanta.

== Building the Virginian Railway ==
The Virginian Railway (VGN) was conceived early in the 20th century by two men. One was a civil engineer, coal mining manager, and entrepreneur, William Nelson Page. His partner was millionaire industrialist, Henry Huttleston Rogers. Together, they built a well-engineered railroad that was virtually a "conveyor belt on rails" to transport high quality "smokeless" bituminous coal from southern West Virginia to port on Hampton Roads, near Norfolk, Virginia.

The Virginian Railway transported coal from West Virginia Coalfields to ports in Hampton Roads. It grew in spite of competition from monopolies. While other railroads curved and went over hills to get to each town, the Virginian was built mostly for coal and was built as straight and steady in grade as possible.

=== Partnership: The idea man from Ansted and a self-made multi-millionaire ===
William Nelson Page (1854–1932) was a civil engineer and entrepreneur. Page, who was born in Virginia and educated at the University of Virginia in Charlottesville, originally came to West Virginia in the 1870s to help build the double-track Chesapeake and Ohio Railway (C&O) in the New and Kanawha River Valleys.

A colorful man by all accounts, Colonel Page, as he came to be known, soon became involved in many coal and related enterprises in the mountains of Virginia and West Virginia, settling in the tiny mountain hamlet of Ansted in Fayette County, West Virginia.

Col. Page was one of the more successful men who developed West Virginia's rich bituminous coal fields in the late 19th and early 20th centuries, and built railroads to transport the coal. With his training and experience as a civil engineer, Page was well prepared to utilize southern West Virginia's resources. Former West Virginia Governor William A. MacCorkle described him as a man who knew "the land as a farmer knows his fields." He was also an energetic entrepreneur. Author H. Reid summed it up by labeling Col. Page "The idea man from Ansted."

Henry Huttleston Rogers (1840–1909) was a financier and industrialist who was raised in Fairhaven, Massachusetts, the son of Rowland Rogers, a former ship captain, bookkeeper, and grocer. He began working while young, working part-time in his father's grocery store and delivering newspapers. After graduating from high school, Rogers worked as a brakeman on the Fairhaven Branch Railroad while saving his money. In 1861 he and a friend went to the mountains of Pennsylvania, and helped develop oil and natural gas resources there during the U.S. Civil War, eventually becoming one of the key men with John D. Rockefeller's Standard Oil Trust and a multi-millionaire. One of the wealthiest men in the US, Rogers was an energetic entrepreneur, much like the younger Page, and was also involved in many rail and mineral development projects.

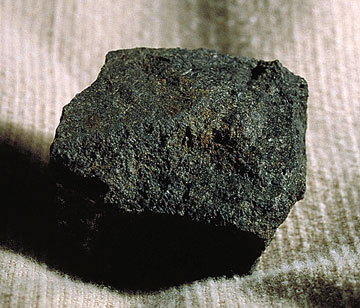
Bituminous coal

Rogers became acquainted with Page while the latter was president of Gauley Mountain Coal Company, among many other ventures. Page knew of rich untapped bituminous coal fields lying between the New River Valley and the lower Guyandotte River in southern West Virginia in an area not yet reached by C&O and its major competitor, the Norfolk & Western Railway (N&W). While the bigger railroads were preoccupied in developing nearby areas and shipping coal via rail to Hampton Roads, Page formed a plan to take advantage of the undeveloped coal lands, with Rogers and several others as investors. A powerful partnership had been formed.

=== Deepwater Railway and Tidewater Railway ===
Originally, the Page-Rogers scheme was a short line railroad, the Deepwater Railway, formed in 1898, an intrastate line intended to be only in West Virginia. Eventually, after establishing relationships to interchange coal traffic with the bigger railroads failed, the Deepwater's right-of-way was extended to reach the West Virginia-Virginia state line near Glen Lyn, Virginia. Important points on the Deepwater Railway were Page, Mullens and Princeton in West Virginia.

In Virginia, another intrastate railroad, the Tidewater Railway, was formed in 1904, with right-of-way across the southern tier of Virginia from Giles County (which borders West Virginia) to Norfolk County on Hampton Roads. The principal points were Roanoke, Victoria, Suffolk, and Sewell's Point, a rural location where a new coal pier was located on the harbor near Norfolk.

=== Victoria is created ===
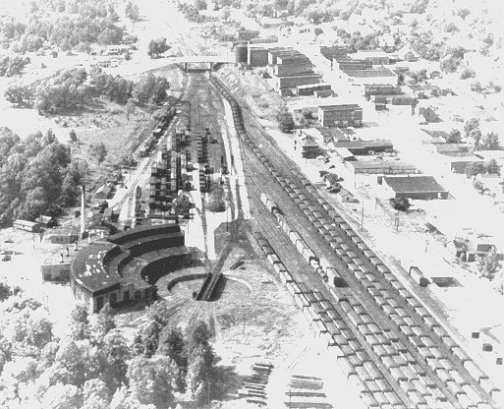
An aerial shot of Victoria in 1954, looking west. It shows the turntable and roundhouse in the lower left, and the passenger station and Norfolk division offices to the right of the tracks

Late in 1906, near the halfway point on the Tidewater Railway between Roanoke and Sewell's Point, a new town with space set aside for railroad offices and shops was created in Lunenburg County, Virginia. It was named Victoria, in honor of Queen Victoria of the United Kingdom, who was admired by Henry Rogers.

Victoria was the location of a large equipment maintenance operation, with roundhouse, turntable, coaling and water facilities for servicing steam locomotives, and a large yard. Offices for the VGN's Norfolk Division were built by adding a second floor to the passenger station building a few years later.

=== 1907: Virginian railway is born ===
The Virginian Railway Company was formed in Virginia on March 8, 1907, to combine the Deepwater Railway in West Virginia and the Tidewater Railway in Virginia into a single interstate railroad, only a few months after Victoria was incorporated. On April 15, 1907, William Nelson Page became the first president of the new Virginian Railway.

Work progressed on the VGN throughout 1907 and 1908 using construction techniques not available when the larger railroads had been built about 25 years earlier. By paying for work with Henry Rogers' personal fortune, the railway was built with no public debt. This feat, a key feature of the successful secrecy in securing the route, was not accomplished without some considerable burden to Rogers.

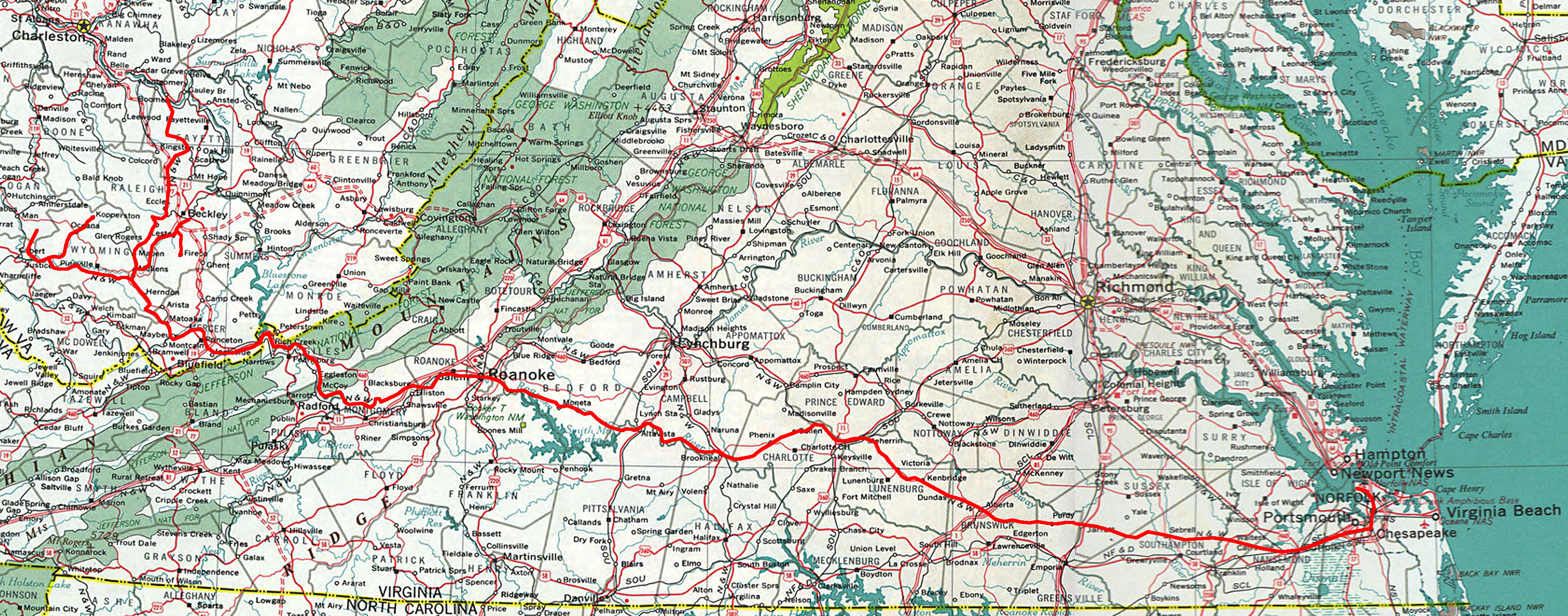
Map of the Virginian Railway

Rogers suffered some financial setbacks in the Financial Panic of 1907 which began in March. Then, a few months later that year, he experienced a debilitating stroke. He was largely disabled for five months. Rogers recovered his health, at least partially, and saw to it that construction was continued on the railroad until it was completed early in 1909.

=== Last spike, celebrations ===
The last spike in the Virginian Railway was driven on January 29, 1909, at the west side of the massive New River Bridge at Glen Lyn, near where the railroad crossed the West Virginia-Virginia state line.

In April 1909, Henry Huttleston Rogers and Mark Twain, old friends, returned to Norfolk, Virginia together once again for a huge celebration of the new "Mountains to the Sea" railroad's completion.

Rogers departed the next day on his first (and only) tour of the new railroad. He died suddenly six weeks later at the age of 69 at his home in New York. By then, the work of the Page-Rogers partnership to build the Virginian Railway had been completed.

Neither William Page nor Henry Rogers operated the railway. Together, they had conceived and built a railroad from the coal mines of West Virginia to tidewater at Hampton Roads.

== Operating and Electrifying "the Richest Little Railroad in the World" ==
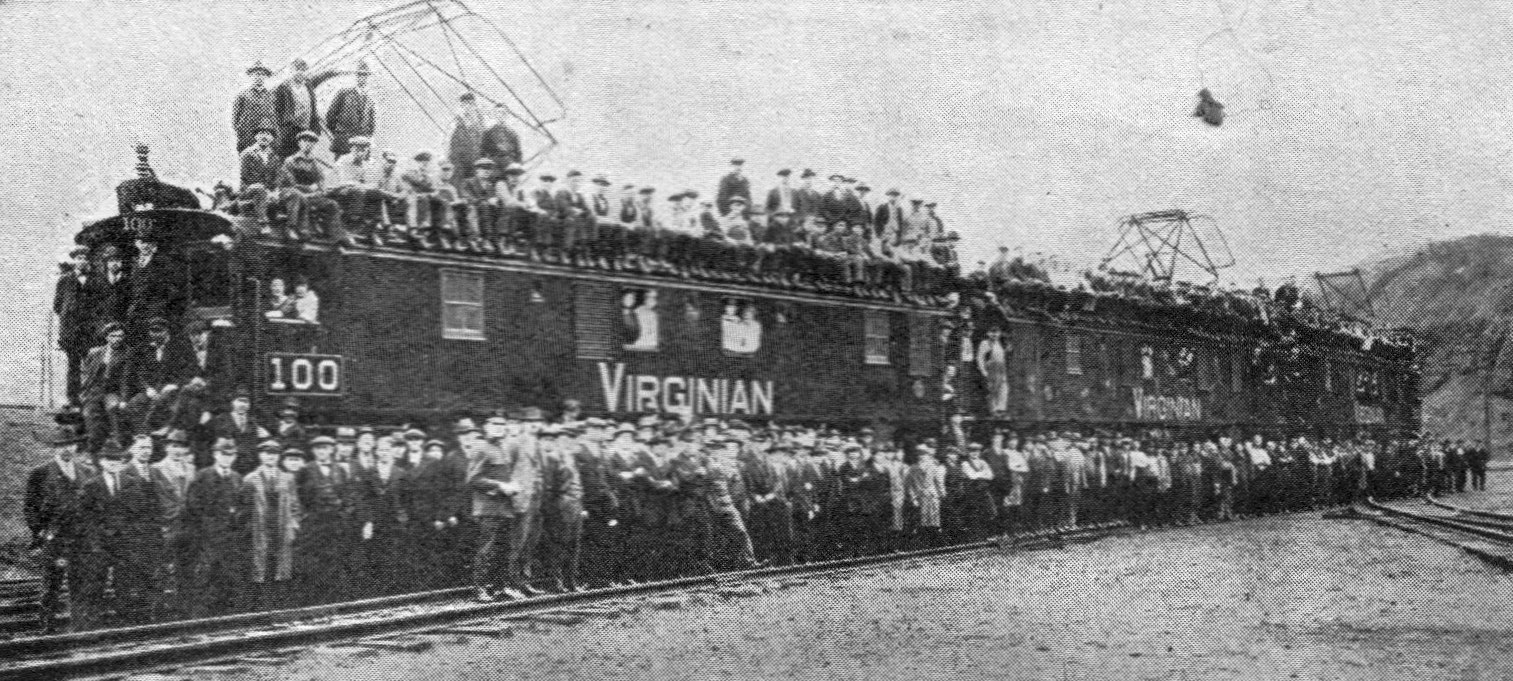
One of the original electric units

Mr. Rogers left his heirs and employees a new railroad which remained closely held until 1937; his son and sons-in-law such as Urban H. Broughton and William R. Coe were among its leaders. Coe served almost its entire history. Throughout its 50-years history, the VGN continued to follow the Page-Rogers policy of "paying up front for the best." It became particularly well known for treating its employees and vendors well, another investment that paid rich dividends. The VGN sought (and achieved) best efficiencies in the mountains, rolling piedmont and flat tidewater terrain. The profitable VGN experimented with the finest and largest steam, electric, and diesel locomotives. It was well known for operating the largest and best equipment, and could afford to. It became nicknamed "the richest little railroad in the world."

The VGN had a very major grade at Clark's Gap, West Virginia, and tried large steam locomotives before turning to an alternative already in use by one of its neighboring competitors, Norfolk & Western Railway: a railway electrification system. With work authorized beginning in 1922, a 134-mile portion of the railroad in the mountains from Mullens, West Virginia over Clark's Gap and several other major grades to Roanoke, Virginia was equipped with overhead wires supported by a catenary system at 11,000 volts. The VGN built its own power plant at Narrows, Virginia. The electrification was completed in 1925 at a cost of $15 million, equal to $275,379,507 today. A link was established with Norfolk & Western to share electricity from its nearby electrification during contingencies. ALCO and Westinghouse supplied the electric locomotives, which were equipped with pantographs. The 36 initial units were normally linked in groups of three as one set, and had much greater load capacity than the steam power they replaced. In 1948, four huge EL-2B twin-unit locomotives were purchased, followed by twelve EL-C rectifier locomotives in 1955.

The seemingly remotely located terminal Page and Rogers planned and built at Sewell's Point played an important role in 20th-century U.S. naval history. Beginning in 1917 the former Jamestown Exposition grounds adjacent to the VGN coal pier was an important facility for the United States Navy. The VGN transported the high quality "smokeless" West Virginia bituminous coal favored by the US Navy for its ships, though all ships not built for fuel oil were converted to fuel oil well before WW II.

In the mid-1950s VGN management realized that the company's devotion to coal as its energy source (for steam locomotives and the power plant at Narrows for the electrification system) was becoming overshadowed by the economies of diesel-electric locomotives and a scarcity of parts for the older steam locomotives. Between 1954 and 1957 a total of 66 diesel-electric locomotives were purchased, including 25 Fairbanks-Morse H-24-66 Train Masters, and 40 H-16-44 smaller road switchers, two with steam generators to haul passenger trains. The last steam locomotive operated in June, 1957.

At the end of 1925 VGN operated 545 route-miles on 902 miles of track; at the end of 1956 mileages were 611 and 1089.

=== Major stations and crossings ===
The following are the major stations and crossings on the Virginian Railway's 436 mile main line:

- Deepwater, West Virginia
- Oak Hill Junction
- Mullens
- Princeton
- Norcross, Virginia
- Merrimac
- Roanoke, crossing Norfolk and Western
- Altavista, crossing Southern Railway
- Brookneal, crossing Norfolk and Western
- Virso, crossing Southern Railway
- Victoria
- Alberta, crossing Seaboard Air Line Railroad
- Jarratt, crossing Atlantic Coast Line Railroad
- Suffolk, crossing Atlantic Coast Line Railroad and Seaboard Air Line Railroad
- Norfolk

== End of steam: decline at servicing points ==
Revenue freight traffic, in millions of net ton-miles
Year	Traffic
1925	2771
1933	1943
1944	4058
1956	5358

Beginning in 1903 Page, West Virginia, named for Col. William Page, was the site of a switching yard, roundhouse, and station on the Deepwater Railway and later the Virginian Railway. After the railroad eliminated steam locomotives in 1957 and the area's coal mines were largely depleted, the facilities at Page were unneeded. Mullens and Princeton in West Virginia, and Roanoke, Victoria and Sewell's Point in Virginia were other locations where extensive steam locomotive servicing facilities and roundhouses were also no longer needed after 1957.

The passenger trains in the system's final decade, the 1950s, consisted of separate runs from Page, West Virginia to Roanoke; and then between August, 1952 and July, 1955, from Roanoke to Norfolk. The last remaining passenger service on the line was discontinued by 1956. The latter route was on a more southerly and more rural itinerary than mainline of the Virginian's major competitor, Norfolk and Western, whose main line went through Lynchburg and Petersburg.

== Merger with Norfolk & Western ==
During World War I, VGN was jointly operated with its adjacent competitor, the Norfolk & Western Railway (N&W), under the USRA's wartime takeover of the Pocahontas Roads. The operating efficiencies were significant. After the war, the railroads were returned to their respective owners and competitive status. However, N&W never lost sight of VGN and its low-grade routing through Virginia.

After World War I there were many attempts by C&O, N&W, and others to acquire the Virginian Railway. However, the US Interstate Commerce Commission (ICC) turned down attempts at combining the roads until the late 1950s, when a proposed Norfolk & Western Railway and Virginian Railway merger was approved in 1959. Electric operation ended June 30, 1962.

== Legacy ==
Two years after the merger, a book written by author and historian H. Reid, The Virginian Railway, was published. Reid stated that "There will always be a Virginian."

Today, major portions of the VGN low-gradient route are the preferred eastbound coal path for N&W's successor Norfolk Southern Railway. Other portions of VGN right-of-way in eastern Virginia now transport fresh water and are under study for future high speed passenger rail service to South Hampton Roads from Richmond and Petersburg. The former VGN property at Sewell's Point is part of the US Naval Station, Norfolk.

Although one of the smaller fallen flags of U.S. railroads, the Virginian Railway continues to have a loyal following of former employees, modelers, authors, photographers, historians and preservationists. Preservationists have saved VGN passenger stations in Suffolk and Roanoke, Virginia. The Suffolk Passenger Station, which was also used by the Seaboard railroads, has been restored and is in use as a museum. Similar plans are underway by the local chapter of the National Railway Historical Society in Roanoke for the Virginian Railway Passenger Station. The Oak Hill Railroad Depot in Oak Hill, West Virginia, the only remaining Virginian station in West Virginia, has also been restored by the local chapter of the National Railway Historical Society. In May 2003, the Virginian Railway Yard Historic District at Princeton was listed on the National Register of Historic Places in 2003.

Three of VGN's locomotives and numerous cabooses and other rolling stock survive. One steam and one electric locomotive have been cosmetically restored, and are on display at the Virginia Museum of Transportation in Roanoke, Virginia.

In October 2002 VGN authors and enthusiasts restored the Mullens, West Virginia Caboose Museum which had been ravaged in one of West Virginia's notorious floods. The work was funded by sale of handmade models and contributions. In April 2004 children of Boonsboro Elementary School in nearby Bedford, Virginia and the local Kiwanis group in Lynchburg, Virginia teamed to raise funds and work to save the railroad's only surviving original (circa 1910) class C-1 wooden caboose. In December 2004, a fully restored and equipped VGN caboose, C-10 No. 342, built by VGN employees in the former Princeton (WV) Shops, was moved to newly laid rails at Victoria, where it is the centerpiece of a new rail heritage park, dedicated in summer 2005.

In May 2003 a Gathering of Rail Friends was held at Victoria, Virginia, home to a museum, with a park with historical interpretations of the roundhouse and turntable sites under development. The Norfolk Southern Railway sent its exhibition train to nearby Crewe for the event.

In October 2004, the Roanoke Times ran a feature story about the weekly meetings of the "Takin' Twenty with the Virginian Brethren" group of retired VGN employees, prominently displaying the model of a modern GE locomotive in Virginian Railway livery, which they hope the railroad will use as a basis for a special painting of current-day Norfolk Southern Railway locomotive to commemorate the 100th anniversary of the 1907 founding of their favorite railroad, the Virginian Railway.

In April 2005, the Virginian Railway Coalfield Seminar was held for three days at Twin Falls State Park, near Mullens, West Virginia. Railfriends from many parts of the United States toured coal mining and railroad facilities for three days on several buses, and participated in presentations and group seminars with a Congressman, local officials, several noted authors and historians. The delegation of retirees based in Roanoke also attended.

In early 2012, Norfolk Southern announced a program to paint selected units of new GE ES44AC and EMD SD70ACe orders into heritage paint schemes for predecessor roads. Virginian Railway was chosen among 19 other former railroads represented in the program. NS SD70ACe 1069 was painted to match the original yellow and black paint scheme worn by VGN's Fairbanks-Morse diesels. As of June 2023, the engine is in Altoona, PA being repainted with fresh paint.

In 2015, a portion of the former Virginian in the state of West Virginia, was mothballed by Norfolk Southern due to a decline in coal shipments. In May 2016, WATCO Companies entered an agreement with Norfolk Southern to lease most of the remaining active line in West Virginia between Maben and Deepwater and operate it under the Kanawha River Railroad (KNWA) to load trains from Norfolk Southern at three mines on their system. The section between Maben and Mullens remains under Norfolk Southern control, with trackage rights for KNWA trains to interchange with NS at Elmore Yard.

== Museums and stations ==
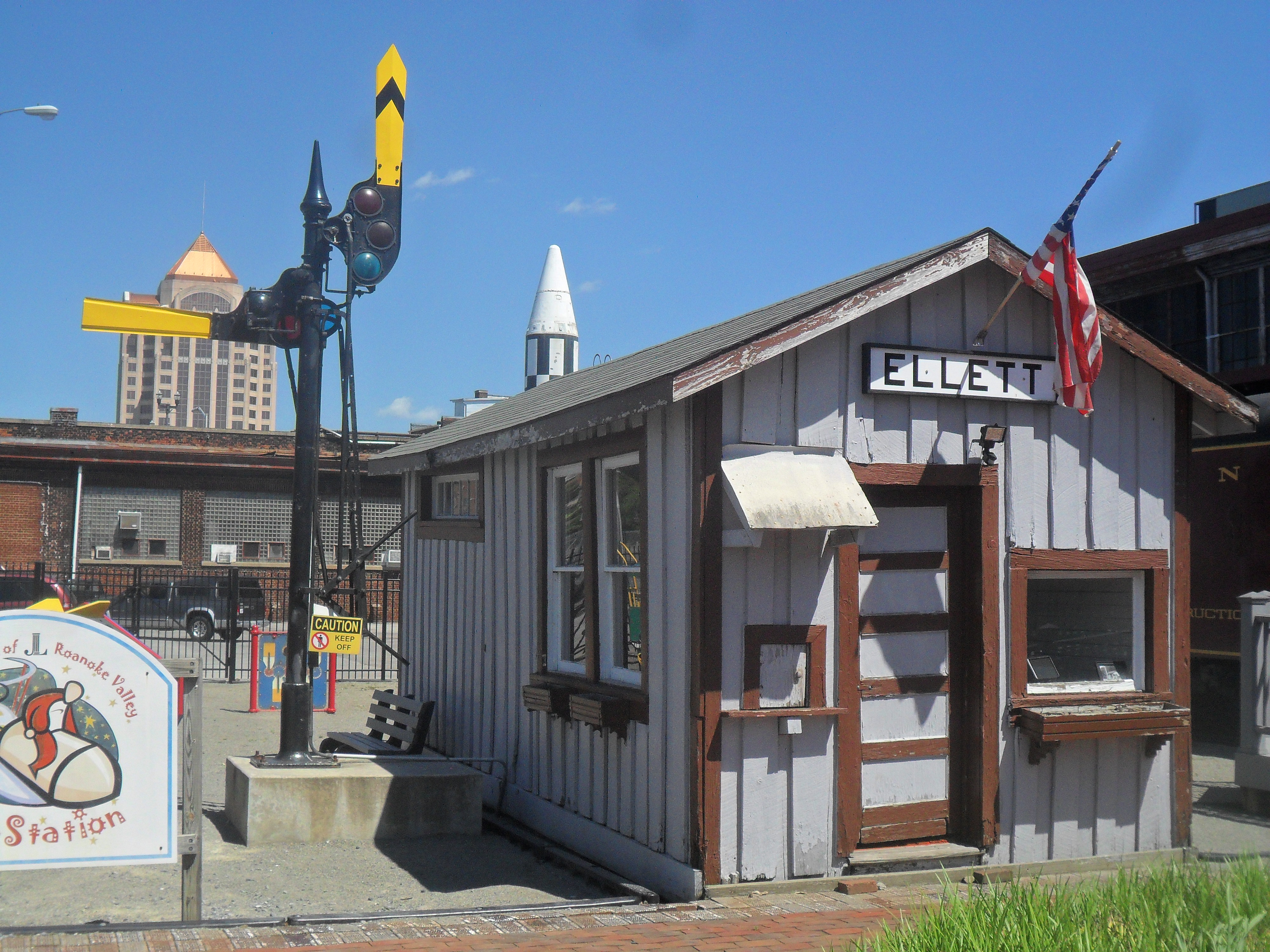
Virginian Railway freight depot from Ellett, now preserved at the Virginia Museum of Transportation in Roanoke, VA.

- Oak Hill, West Virginia - restored VGN freight station
- Mullens, West Virginia - VGN Caboose 307 Museum
- Princeton, West Virginia - Replica Station and Museum
- Roanoke, Virginia - Virginia Museum of Transportation – 2 VGN locomotives, misc. rolling stock, and restored VGN freight station (from Ellett) 2025 update: the Ellett depot was virtually destroyed by VMT in an attempt to move it, the remains were donated to Roanoke Chapter NRHS who plans to rebuild and restore it as time permits.
- Roanoke, Virginia - Preservation of VGN Passenger Station and Future Museum
- Victoria, Virginia- Fully restored and equipped VGN caboose 342 and Museum
- Suffolk, Virginia - restored Seaboard and VGN combination station, Museum and model train layout of Suffolk area circa 1940
- Norfolk Terminal Station - the Virginian Railway's eastern terminus, the Norfolk and Western's headquarters, demolished, 1963

== See also ==
- Railroad electrification in the United States
