= Norfolk and Western Railway Freight Station =

- U.S. National Register of Historic Places
- U.S. Historic district
- Virginia Landmarks Register
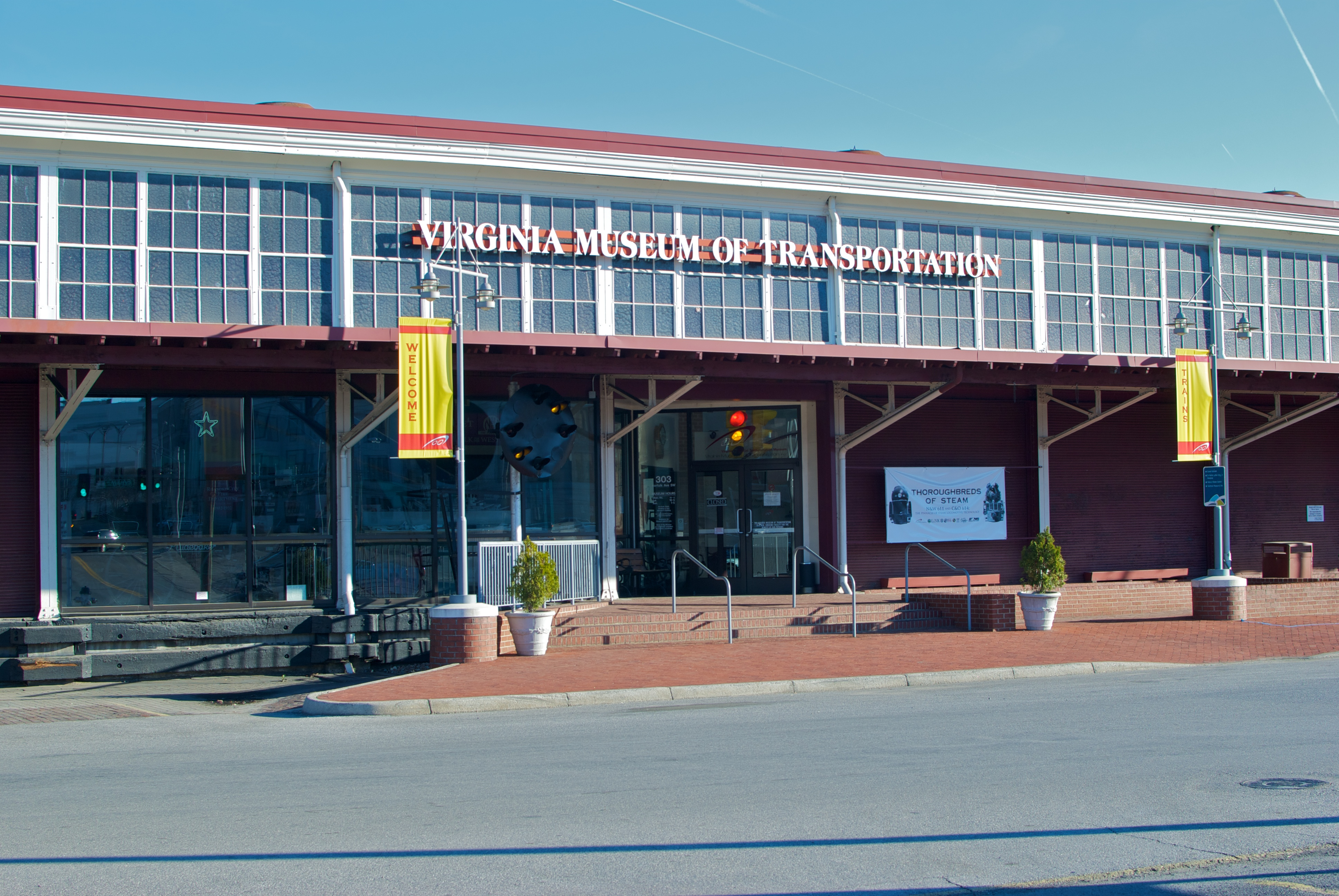
- The historic Norfolk and Western Freight Station, which currently serves as the headquarters of the Virginia Museum of Transportation.

- Location within Virginia Location within the United States
- Location: 303 Norfolk Ave, Roanoke, Virginia
- Coordinates: 37°16′23″N 79°56′46″W
- Area: 3.14 acres (1.27 ha)
- Built: c. 1918
- Built by: Norfolk and Western Railway
- NRHP reference No.: 12000969
- VLR No.: 128-6162

Significant dates
- Added to NRHP: November 21, 2012
- Designated VLR: September 20, 2012

Norfolk and Western Railway Freight Station is a historic freight depot located in the Melrose-Rugby neighborhood of Roanoke, Virginia. It encompasses 111 contributing buildings and 2 contributing objects in a planned residential subdivision, with most of the dwellings being built between the late 1910s and late 1940s. It is a primarily residential district with single-family dwellings. The houses include American Craftsman-style bungalow, American Foursquare, and Cape Cod style. The building houses the Virginia Museum of Transportation

It was listed on the National Register of Historic Places in 2013.
