= Virginian EL-2B =

Large electric locomotive

Virginian Railway EL-2B Class
- Virginian EL-2B, near Salem, VA., July 11, 1953
Type and origin
- Power type: Electric
- Builder: GE Erie Works
- Build date: 1948
- Total produced: 4 (8 individual locomotives)
Specifications
- Configuration
  - Whyte: (4-4-4-4)+(4-4-4-4)
  - AAR: (B+B-B+B)+(B+B-B+B)
  - UIC: (Bo′Bo′)(Bo′Bo′)+(Bo′Bo′)(Bo′Bo′)
- Gauge: 4 ft 8 1/2 in (1,435 mm)
- Wheel diameter: 42 in (1.1 m)
- Length: 150 ft 8 in (45.92 m)
- Width: 11 ft 1 in (3.38 m)
- Height: 15 ft 6 in (4.72 m)
- Adhesive weight: 1,033,832 lb (468.938 t)
- Loco weight: 1,033,832 lb (468.938 t)
- Electric system/s: 11 kV, 25 Hz AC
- Current pickup: Pantograph
- Traction motors: 16 × 500 hp (370 kW) GE 746
- Transmission: AC Synchronous motors(2x)/ DC Generators(4x)/ DC traction motors(16x)
- Train heating: None
- Loco brake: Air/Regenerative
- Train brakes: Air
Performance figures
- Maximum speed: 50 mph (80 km/h)
- Power output: 6,800 hp (5,100 kW)
- Tractive effort: 260,000 lbf (1,200 kN)
Career
- Operators: Virginian Railway
- Class: EL-2B
- Number in class: 4
- Numbers: 125–128
- Delivered: 1948
- Retired: 1959
- Disposition: All scrapped by 1959

The Virginian Railway's class EL-2B comprised four two-unit electric locomotives with AAR (B+B-B+B)+(B+B-B+B) wheel arrangements. The locomotives were used on the 133-mile (214 km) electrified portion of the railroad, from Roanoke, Virginia to Mullens, West Virginia. These large motor–generator locomotives weighed 1,033,832 pounds (468.938 t), were 150 feet 8 inches (45.92 m) long, and were capable of producing 6,800 horsepower (5.1 MW).

The EL-2B locomotives were built at General Electric's Erie works in 1948. Numbered 125–128, they were the largest two-unit electric locomotives used in North America.

The locomotives were retired and sold for scrap shortly after the 1959 merger of the Virginian with the Norfolk and Western Railway. None of the 4 examples built have survived.

== Gallery ==
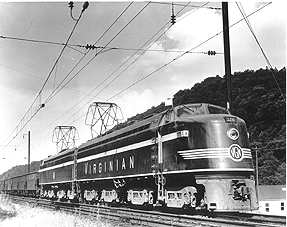
