= Norfolk and Western Railway =

Former US Class I railroad

Overview
- Headquarters: Roanoke, Virginia
- Reporting mark: NW
- Locale: Virginia, Maryland, North Carolina, West Virginia, Kentucky, and Ohio; after the 1960s mergers, also Illinois, Indiana, Iowa, Michigan, Missouri, New York, Nebraska Pennsylvania Ontario
- Founder: William Mahone
- Dates of operation: 1870–1982
- Successor: Norfolk Southern

Technical
- Track gauge: 4 ft 8 1/2 in (1,435 mm) standard gauge
- Previous gauge: 5 ft (1,524 mm) (?)
- Length: 1956: 2132 miles (3,431 km); 1970: 7595 miles (12,223 km)

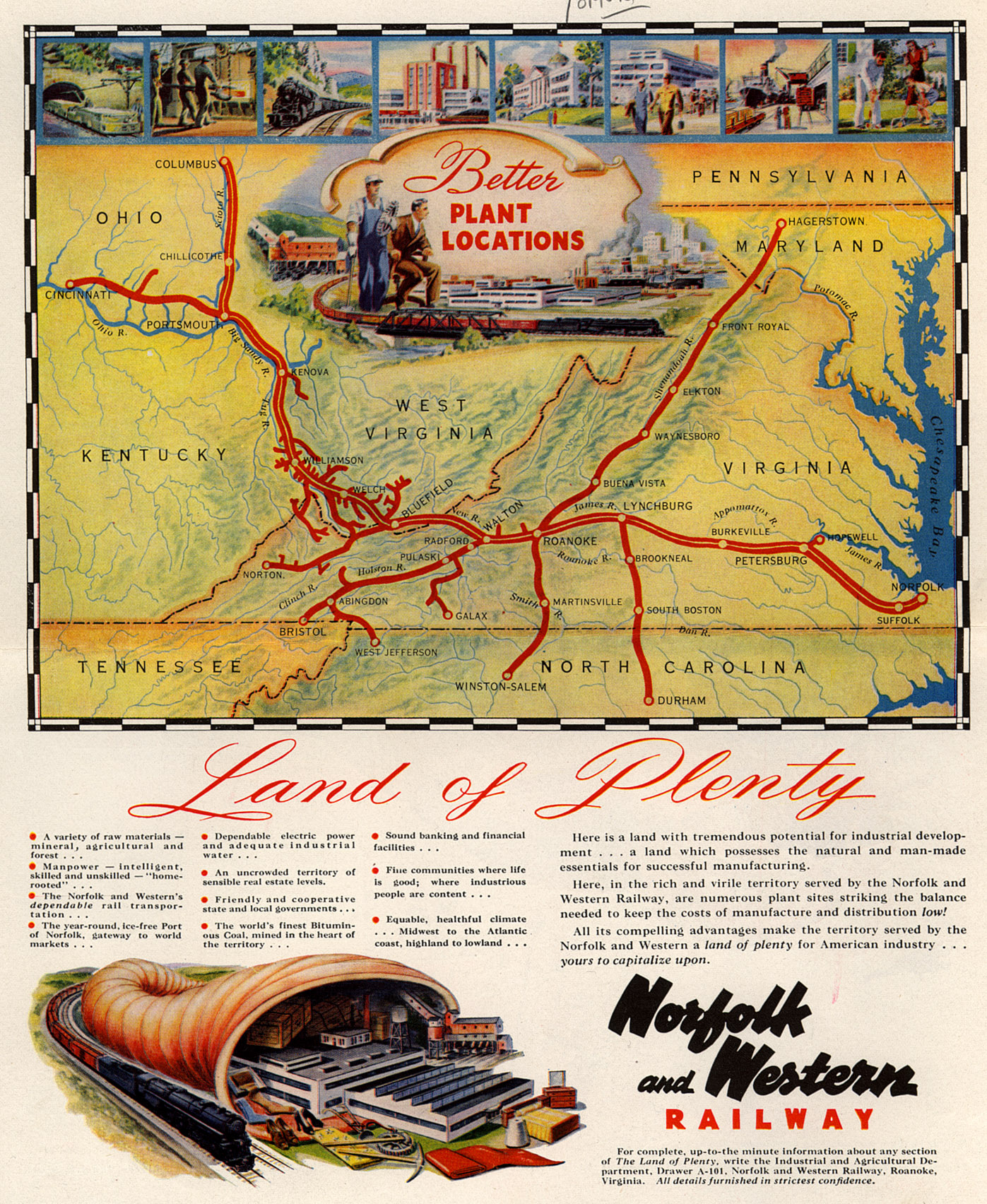
An N&W magazine ad titled "Land of Plenty" with the railroad's system map, 1948

The Norfolk and Western Railway (reporting mark NW), commonly called the N&W, was an American class I railroad, formed by more than 200 railroad mergers between 1838 and 1982. It was headquartered in Roanoke, Virginia, for most of its existence. Its motto was "Precision Transportation"; it had a variety of nicknames, including "King Coal" and "British Railway of America". In 1986, N&W merged with Southern Railway to form today's Norfolk Southern Railway.

The N&W was famous for manufacturing its own steam locomotives, which were built at the Roanoke Shops, as well as its own hopper cars. After 1960, N&W was the last major Class I railroad using steam locomotives; the last remaining Y class 2-8-8-2s would eventually be retired in 1961.

In December 1959, the N&W merged with the Virginian Railway (reporting mark VGN), a longtime rival in the Pocahontas coal region. By 1970, other mergers with the Nickel Plate Road and Wabash formed a system that operated 7,595 miles (12,223 km) of road on 14,881 miles (23,949 km) of track from North Carolina to New York and from Virginia to Iowa.

In 1980, the N&W merged its business operation with those of the Southern Railway, another profitable carrier, to create the Norfolk Southern Corporation holding company. The N&W and the Southern Railway continued as separate railroads operating under the single holding company.

In 1982, the Southern Railway was renamed as the Norfolk Southern Railway, and the holding company transferred the N&W to the control of the newly renamed company.

== History ==
=== Predecessors ===
==== City Point, Southside and Virginia and Tennessee railroads ====
The N&W's earliest predecessor was the City Point Railroad (CPRR), a 9-mile (14 km) short-line railroad formed in 1838 to extend from City Point (now part of the independent city of Hopewell, Virginia), a port on the tidal James River, to Petersburg, Virginia, on the fall line of the shallower Appomattox River. In 1854, CPRR became part of the South Side Railroad, which connected Petersburg with Lynchburg, where it interchanged through traffic with the Virginia and Tennessee Railroad (V&T) and the James River and Kanawha Canal.

==== Norfolk and Petersburg Railroad ====
William Mahone (1826–95), an 1847 engineering graduate of the Virginia Military Institute (VMI), was employed by Francis Mallory to build the Norfolk and Petersburg Railroad (N&P) and eventually became its president in the pre-Civil War era. Construction of the N&P began in 1853. Mahone's innovative corduroy roadbed through the Great Dismal Swamp near Norfolk, Virginia, employed a log foundation laid at right angles beneath the surface of the swamp. It is still in use 150 years later and it withstands immense tonnages of coal traffic.

Mahone married Otelia Butler, from Smithfield in Isle of Wight County, Virginia, a daughter of Robert Butler (1784–1853), a Virginia state treasurer. Popular legend has it that Otelia and William Mahone traveled along the newly completed N&P naming stations along the 52-mile (84 km) tangent between Suffolk and Petersburg from Ivanhoe, a book she was reading by Walter Scott. From Scott's historical Scottish novels, Otelia chose the place names of Windsor, Waverly and Wakefield. She tapped the Scottish Clan "McIvor" for the name of Ivor, a small Southampton County town. When they could not agree on a name for a station just west of the Sussex County line in Prince George, it is said that the young couple invented a new word in honor of their "dispute", which is how the tiny community of Disputanta was named. The N&P was completed in 1858.

==== Civil War ====
Of small stature, dynamic "Little Billy" Mahone became a major general in the Confederate Army during the American Civil War. He was widely regarded as the hero of the Battle of the Crater during the Siege of Petersburg in 1864–65. Otelia Mahone served as a nurse in the Confederate capital of Richmond.

The N&P was severed by the war. The portion east of the Blackwater River at Zuni, Virginia, was held by the Union for most of the war. The eastern portion of the City Point Railroad played a crucial role for Union General Ulysses S. Grant during the Siege of Petersburg and was operated by the United States Military Railroad. The South Side Railroad was also heavily damaged.

=== Early years ===
==== Beginning as the Atlantic, Mississippi & Ohio Railroad ====
William and Otelia Mahone were illustrious characters in post-bellum Virginia. Mahone got quickly to work restoring "his" N&P and resumed his dream of linking the three trunk lines across the southern tier of Virginia to reach points to the west. He became president of all three and drove the 1870 merger of the N&P, the South Side Railroad and the Virginia and Tennessee Railroad to form the Atlantic, Mississippi and Ohio Railroad (AM&O). The AM&O extended 408 miles (657 km) from Norfolk to Bristol, Virginia. The Mahones moved to the headquarters city of Lynchburg, the midpoint of the AM&O. The acronym AM&O was said to stand for "All Mine and Otelia's."

The AM&O operated profitably in the early 1870s but like many railroads encountered financial problems during the Panic of 1873. A fourth road of the AM&O family was planned to extend west through the Cumberland Gap to Kentucky, but was never built. Mahone retained control of AM&O for several more years before his relationship with English and Scottish bondholders deteriorated in 1876 and receivers were appointed to oversee his work. After several years of operating under receiverships, Mahone's role as a railroad builder ended in 1881 when northern financial interests took control.

At the foreclosure auction, the AM&O was purchased by E.W. Clark & Co., a private banking firm in Philadelphia with ties to the large Pennsylvania Railroad. The PRR was seeking a southern connection for its Shenandoah Valley Railroad (SVRR), which was then under construction up the valley from the Potomac River.

==== Name change to Norfolk and Western ====
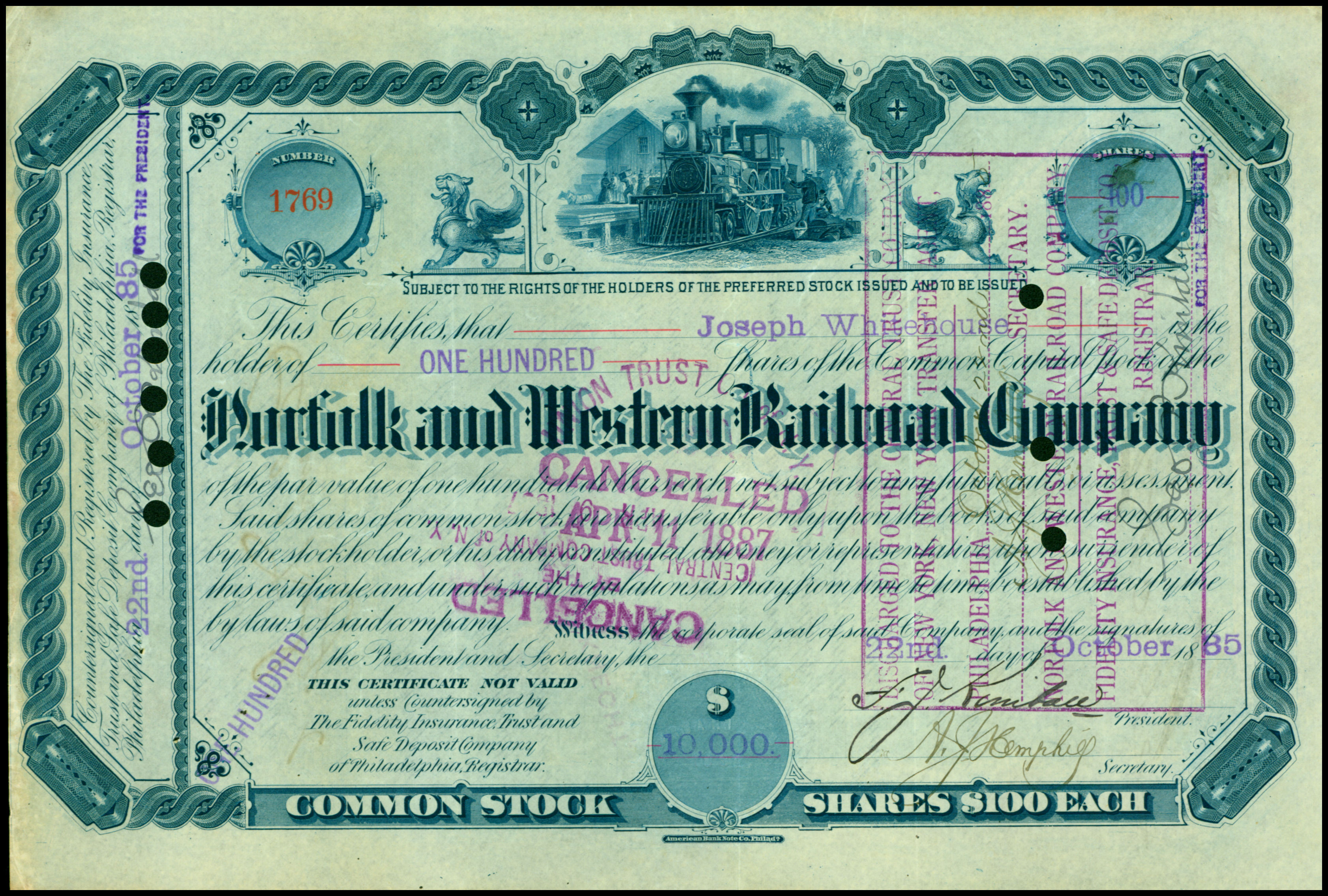
A common stock share of the N&W, issued October 22, 1885

In 1881, the AM&O was reorganized and renamed Norfolk and Western, a name perhaps taken from an 1850s charter application filed by citizens of Norfolk, Virginia. George Frederick Tyler became president. Frederick J. Kimball, a civil engineer and partner in E.W. Clark & Co., became First Vice President. Henry Fink, whom Mahone had hired in 1855, became Second Vice President and General Superintendent.

Kimball and his board of directors selected Big Lick, a small Virginia village on the Roanoke River, to be the junction of SVRR and the N&W. Big Lick was later renamed Roanoke, Virginia. Over time, Roanoke began to grow and in the 1950s, reached a population of over 90,000.

At its founding, the N&W primarily transported agricultural products. Kimball, who had a strong interest in geology, led the railroad's efforts to open the Pocahontas coalfields in western Virginia and southern West Virginia. In mid-1881, the N&W acquired the franchises to four other lines: the New River Railroad, Mining and Manufacturing Company, the Bluestone Railroad, and the East River Railroad. Consolidated into the New River Railroad Company, with Kimball as president, these railroads became the basis for N&W's New River Division, which was soon built from New Kanawha (near East Radford) up the west bank of the New River through Pulaski County and into Giles County to the mouth of the East River near Glen Lyn, Virginia. From there, the new line ran up the East River, crossing the Virginia-West Virginia border several times to reach the coalfields to the west near the Great Flat Top Mountain. Coal transported to Norfolk soon became NW's primary commodity and led to great wealth and profitability.

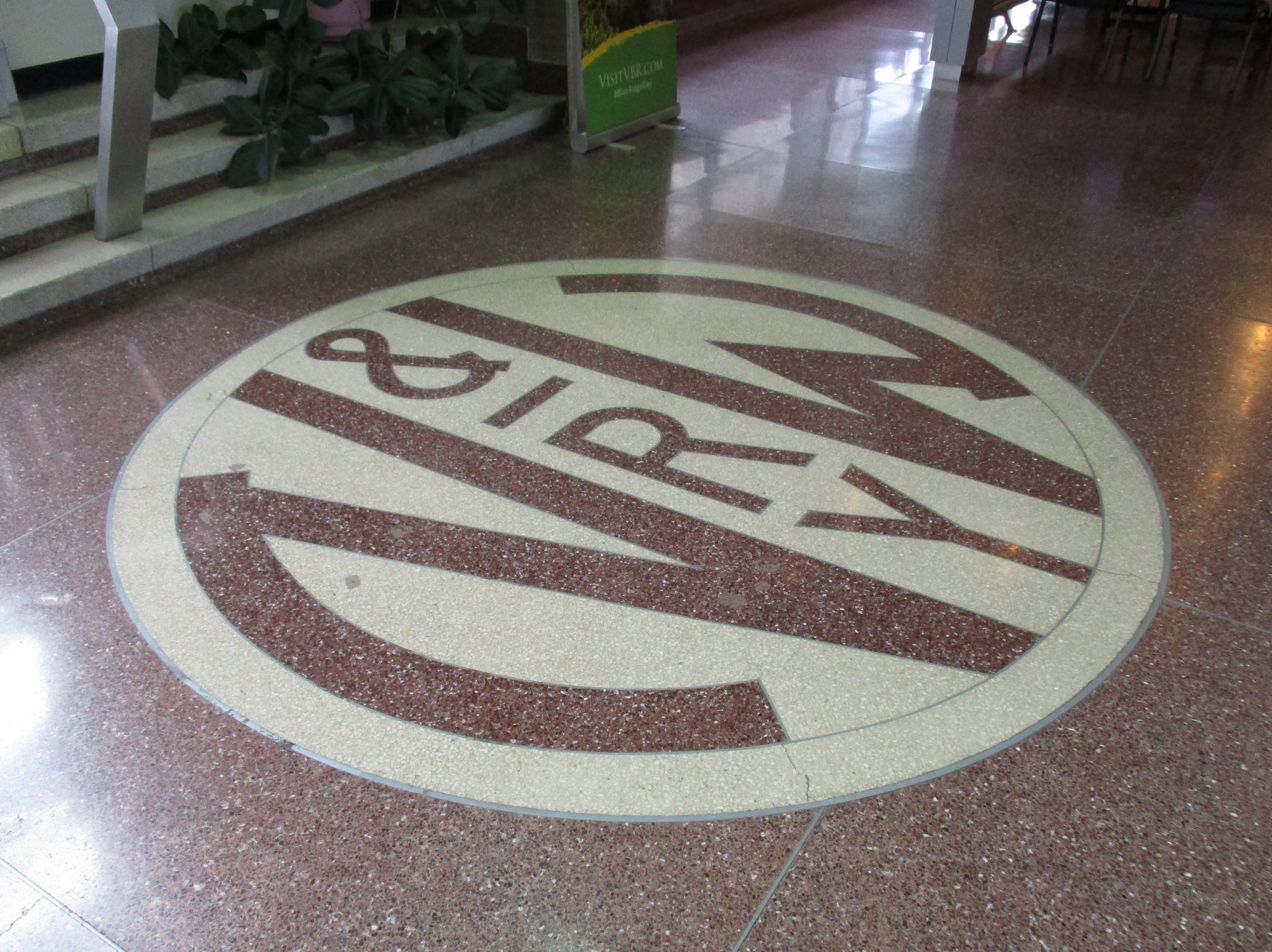
The N&W terrazzo logo on the floor of the O. Winston Link Museum in Roanoke

Kimball served as N&W president from 1883 to 1895. Under his leadership, the N&W continued expansion westward with its lines through the wilderness of West Virginia with the Ohio Extension, eventually extending north across the Ohio River to Columbus, Ohio by the Scioto Valley Railroad. Acquisition of other lines, including the Cincinnati, Portsmouth and Virginia Railroad (CP&V) (which it had long supported and leased) extended the N&W system west along the Ohio River to Cincinnati, Ohio, south from Lynchburg to Durham, North Carolina, and south from Roanoke to Winston-Salem, North Carolina. By the time Kimball died in 1903, the railroad had attained the basic structure it would use for more than 60 years.

In 1890 the N&W bought out the Shenandoah Valley Railroad. This gave the railroad a reach north of the Potomac River and the Virginia-Maryland border, and a line with territory reaching as far north as Harrisburg, Pennsylvania. This would become referred to as the Shenandoah Valley Division.

==== Coal ====
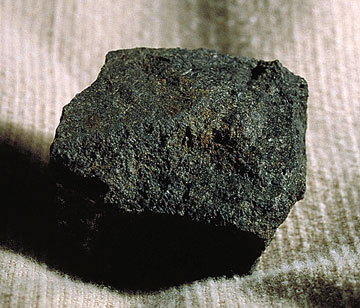
A piece of bituminous coal

In 1885, several small mining companies representing about 400,000 acres (1,600 km^{2}) of bituminous coal reserves grouped together to form the coalfields' largest landowner, the Philadelphia-based Flat-Top Coal Land Association. The N&W bought the association and reorganized it as the Pocahontas Coal and Coke Company (PCCC). The PCCC was later renamed the Pocahontas Land Corporation (PLC) and is now a subsidiary of NS.

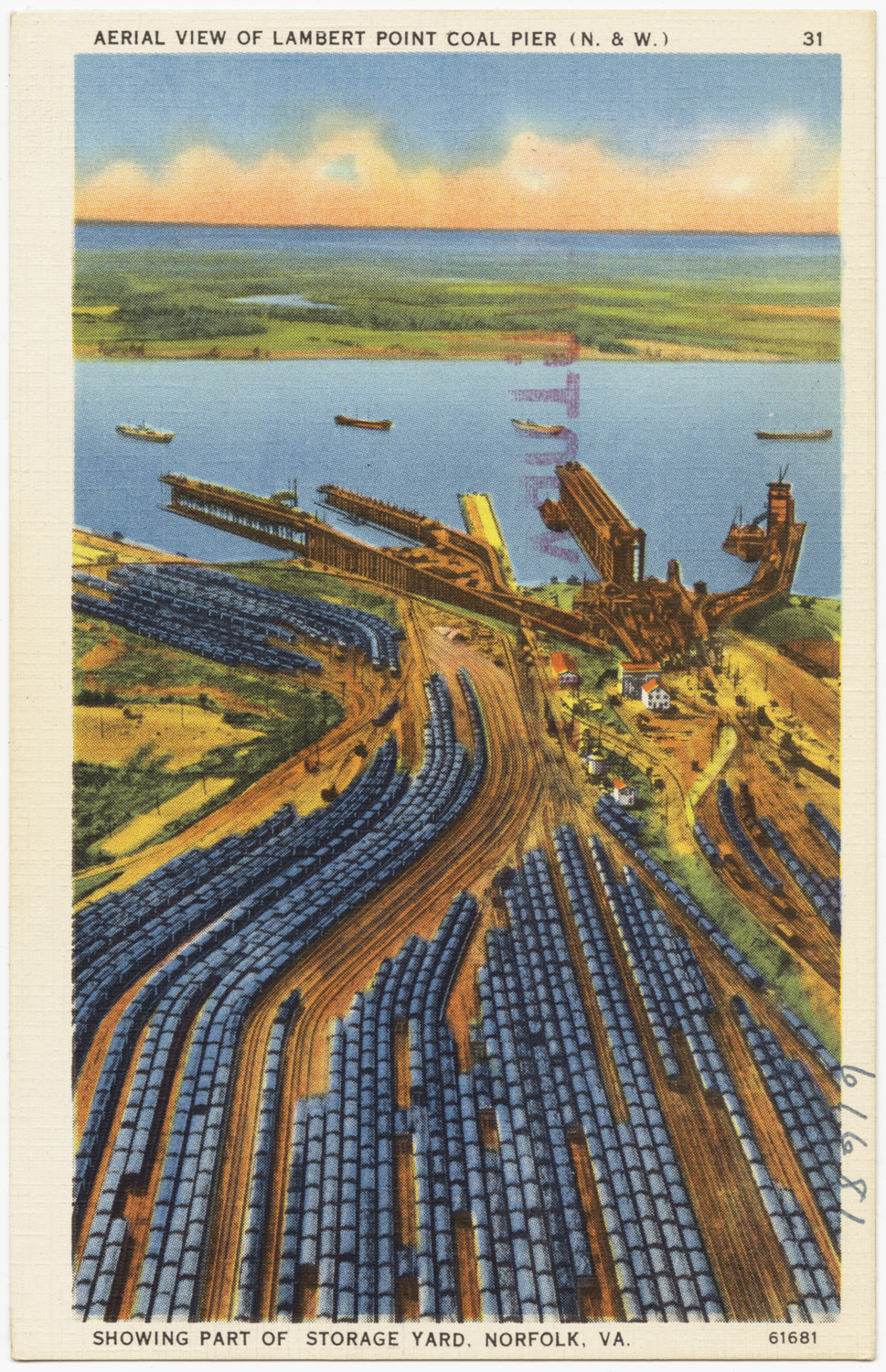
An aerial view of Lambert Point Coal Pier showing part of storage yard in Norfolk

As the availability and fame of high-quality Pocahontas bituminous coal increased, economic forces took over. Coal operators and their employees settled dozens of towns in southern West Virginia, and in the next few years, as coal demand swelled, some of them amassed fortunes. The countryside was soon sprinkled with tipples, coke ovens, houses for workers, company stores and churches. In the four decades before the Crash of 1929 and subsequent Depression, these coal towns flourished. One example was the small community of Bramwell, West Virginia, which in its heyday boasted the highest per capita concentration of millionaires in the country.

In 1886, the N&W tracks were extended directly to coal piers at Lambert's Point, which was located in Norfolk County just north of the City of Norfolk on the Elizabeth River, where one of the busiest coal export facilities in the world was built to reach Hampton Roads shipping. A residential section was also developed to house the families of the workers. Many early residents of Lambert's Point were involved in the coal industry.

==== Roanoke Shops ====
The company was famous for building its own steam locomotives, a practice rare outside Britain (where most railways either built their own locomotives or had outside contractors build locomotives to their designs). The locomotives were built at the Roanoke Shops at Roanoke. The Shops employed thousands of craftsmen, who refined their products over the years. The A, J, and Y6 locomotives, designed, built and maintained by NW personnel, brought the company industry-wide fame for its excellence in steam power. The N&W's commitment to steam power was due in part to its investment in the manufacturing capacity and human resources to build and operate steam locomotives, and partially due to the major commodity it hauled, coal. During the 1950s, N&W rebuilt its W Class 2-8-0 Consolidations into Shop Co W6 0-8-0Ts. In 1960, the N&W became the last major railroad in the United States to abandon steam locomotives for diesel-electric motive power. The Roanoke Shops continued to build and repair rolling stock until 2020 when Norfolk Southern closed them, ending 139 years of operations.

To bolster the Roanoke locomotive department, in 1916 the N&W added a large terminal (one full-circle roundhouse and two half-circle roundhouses), car shops, and yard at Shaffers Crossing, west of downtown. These continued to operate after the conversion to diesel power.

Because the Roanoke Shops were so large and complete, the only other heavy repair site needed was located in Portsmouth, Ohio to serve the western section of the system, which employed about 2,000 in the 1920s. These shops took the place of the roundhouse and shop at Bluefield, West Virginia.

=== Later years ===
==== Roanoke & Southern ====
The Roanoke & Southern Railway Company was organized in 1887, succeeding separate companies called Roanoke & Southern in North Carolina and Virginia. Norfolk and Western leased the Roanoke & Southern (called the Norfolk, Roanoke & Southern Rail Road by 1896) starting in 1892 but it became part of Norfolk and Western in 1911.

==== World Wars, Great Depression, and efficiencies ====
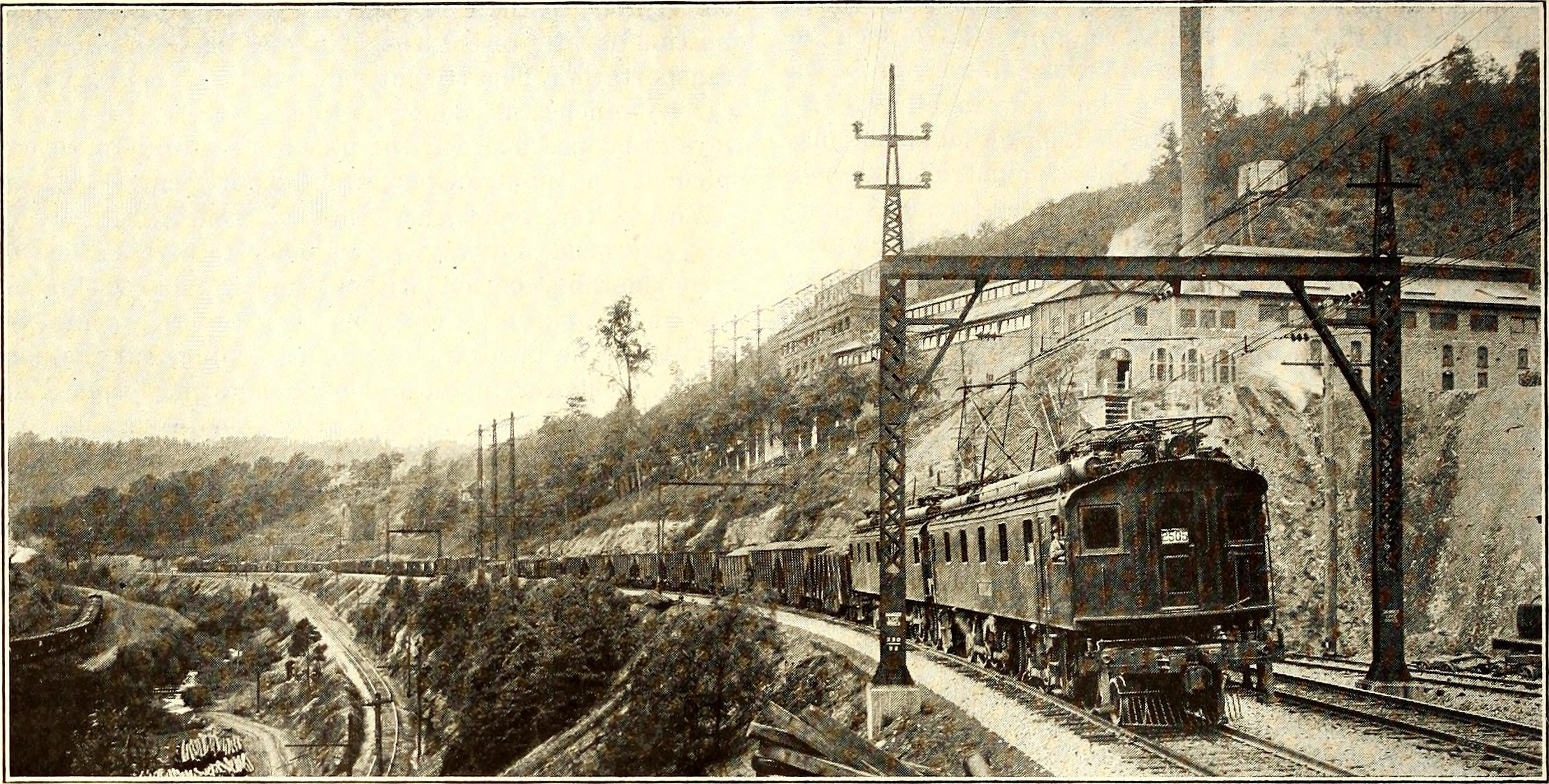
A pair of electric N&W locomotives hauling a coal train during World War I

Revenue freight traffic, in millions of net ton-miles
Year	Traffic
1925	13,684
1933	9,804
1944	19,907
1956	22,364

The N&W operated profitably through World War I and World War II and paid regular dividends throughout the Depression. During World War I, the N&W was jointly operated with VGN under the USRA's wartime takeover of the Pocahontas Roads. The operating efficiencies were significant, and after the war, when the railroads were returned to their respective owners and competitive status, the N&W never lost sight of the VGN and its low-gradient routing through Virginia. N&W meanwhile during World War 2 used their J's, K1's, A Class, and S1 Switchers to handle the troop trains from Ohio to Norfolk, a point of embarkation. Other three were New York, San Francisco, and San Diego. However, the US Interstate Commerce Commission (ICC) turned down attempts at combining the roads until 1959, when a proposed N&W-VGN merger was finally approved.

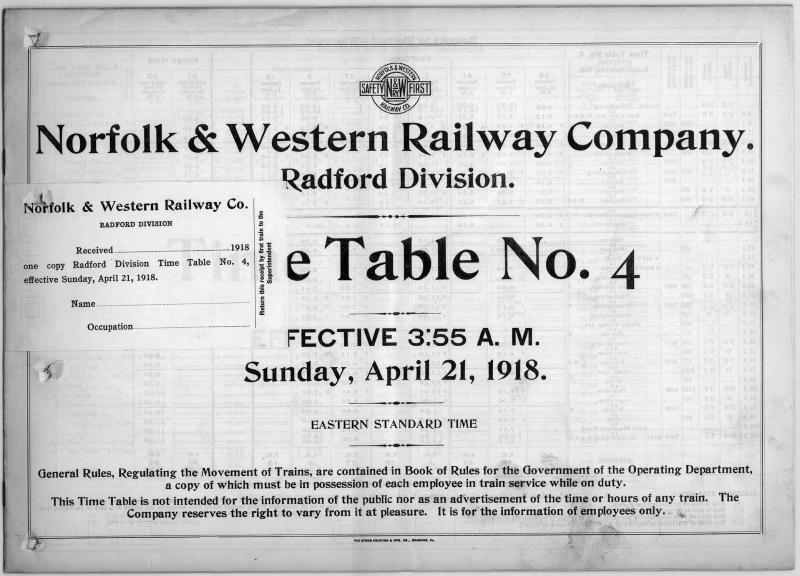
A N&W timetable for a division in Virginia, 1918

The N&W also operated safely in this time, being the recipient of the Gold E. H. Harriman Award for 1938. In a promotional booklet published in 1939, the N&W wrote "For the second time in 12 years, the American Museum of Safety has awarded the Harriman Memorial Gold Medal to the Norfolk & Western Railway for the outstanding safety record during 1938 among class I railroads of the United States." It is further noted that the railway carried one million passengers more than 86,000,000 miles (138,000,000 km) without incident in the period from 1924 to 1938.

At the end of 1925, the N&W operated 2,241 miles (3,607 km) of route on 4,429 miles (7,128 km) track; at the end of 1956 NW operated 2,132 miles (3,431 km) of route on 4,759 miles (7,659 km) of track.

==== Acquiring the Virginian Railway ====
VGN was conceived and built by William Nelson Page and Henry Huttleston Rogers. Page had helped engineer and build the Chesapeake & Ohio Railway (C&O) through the mountains of West Virginia and Rogers had already become a millionaire and a principal of Standard Oil before their partnership was formed early in the 20th century.

Initially, their project was an 80-mile (130 km)-long short line railroad. After failing to establish favorable rates to interchange coal traffic with the big railroads (who shut them out through collusion), the project expanded. Rogers was apparently a silent partner in the early stages, and the bigger railroads did not take Page seriously. However, the partners planned and then built a "Mountains to Sea" railroad from the coal fields of southern West Virginia to port near Norfolk at Sewell's Point in the harbor of Hampton Roads. They accomplished this right under the noses of the pre-existing and much bigger C&O and N&W railroads and their leaders by forming two small intrastate railroads, Deepwater Railway, in West Virginia, and Tidewater Railway in Virginia. Once right-of-way and land acquisitions had been secured, the two small railroads were merged in 1907 to form the Virginian Railway.

Engineered by Page and financed almost entirely from Rogers' personal resources, VGN lines were laid on the principle that picking the best route and buying the best equipment would save operating expenses.

Mark Twain spoke at VGN's dedication in Norfolk, Virginia, only 6 weeks before Rogers died in May 1909 after his only inspection trip on the newly completed railroad. That June, Booker T. Washington made a whistle-stop speaking tour on VGN, traveling in Rogers' private car, Dixie, and later revealing that Rogers had been instrumental in funding many small country schools and institutions of higher education in the South for the betterment of Black communities.

VGN operated over more modern alignments than the C&O, and the N&W, and its track was built to the highest standards. It provided major competition for coal traffic to C&O and the N&W. The 600-mile (970 km) VGN followed Rogers' philosophy throughout its profitable history, earning the nickname "Richest Little Railroad in the World." It operated some of the largest and most powerful steam, electric, and diesel locomotives.

The VGN electrified 134 miles (216 km) of its route between 1922 and 1926 at a cost of $15 million, and had its own power plant at Narrows, Virginia. It shared electrical resources with N&W from 1925 to 1950, when the N&W discontinued its own, shorter, electrified section through the Elkhorn Tunnel and Great Flat Top Mountain region. The VGN track was de-electrified in 1962, after the N&W-VGN merger.

==== Merger era: 1960–1982 ====
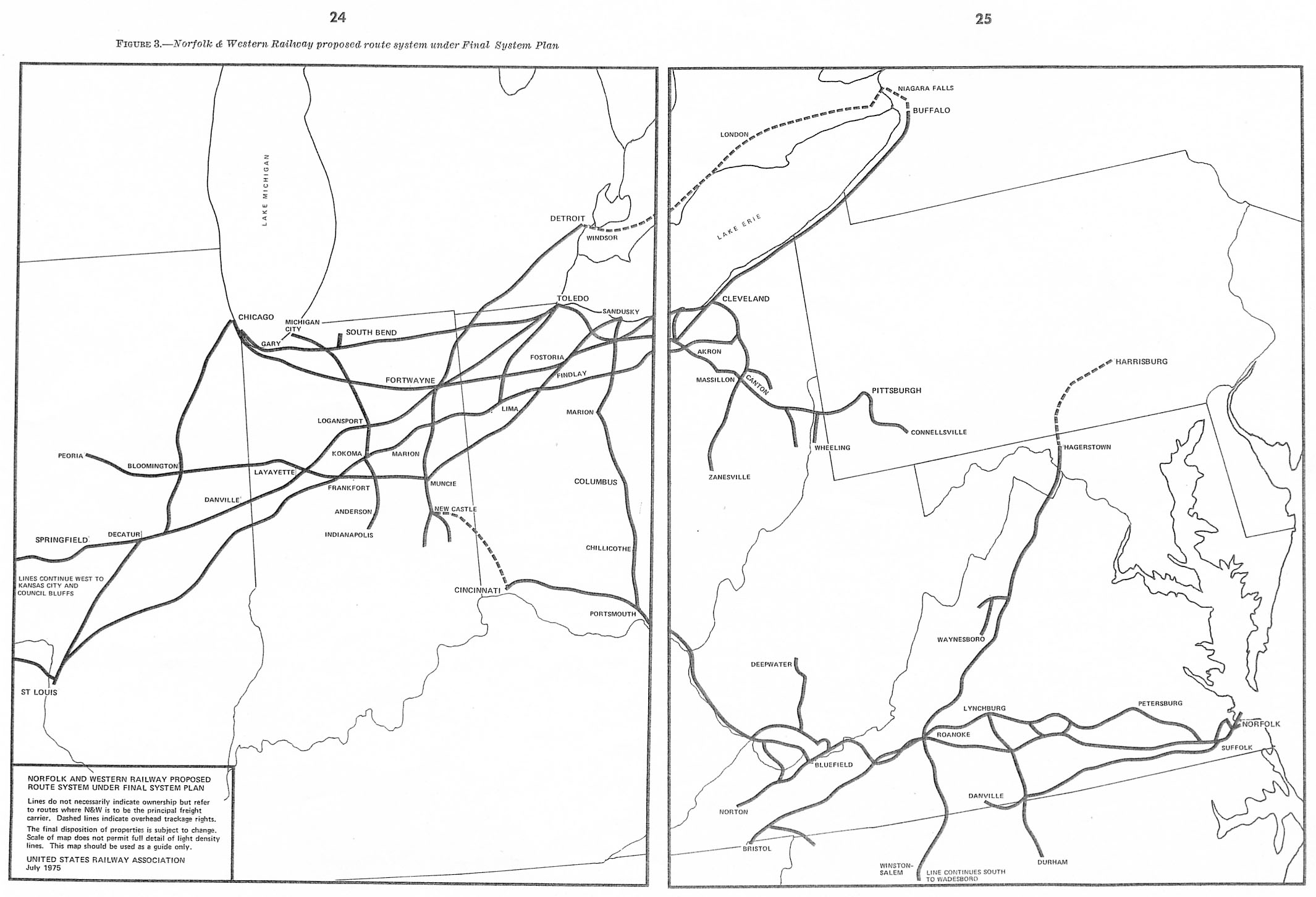
The N&W system map, around 1975

In 1955, the N&W operated in North Carolina, Virginia, Kentucky, West Virginia, Maryland, and Ohio. In 1959, the Interstate Commerce Commission (ICC) approved VGN's merger into the N&W.

In 1964, the former Wabash; Nickel Plate; Pittsburgh and West Virginia Railway; and Akron, Canton and Youngstown Railroad were brought into the system in one of the most complex mergers of the era. This consolidation, plus the 1976 addition of a more direct route to Chicago, Illinois, made N&W an important Midwestern railroad that provided direct single-line service between the Atlantic Ocean and the Great Lakes and Mississippi River.

In 1968, the N&W formed Dereco, a holding company that owned the Delaware & Hudson (D&H) and Erie Lackawanna (EL) railroads. Dereco's troubled railroads were not merged into the N&W: EL eventually joined Conrail and D&H was sold to Guilford Transportation Industries; it is now part of Canadian Pacific.

In 1970, the N&W operated in North Carolina, Virginia, Kentucky, West Virginia, Maryland, Ohio, Pennsylvania, New York, Indiana, Michigan, Illinois, Missouri, and Iowa.

In 1980, the song "There's No Stopping Us", more commonly known as "Cargo Movin' People," was written and recorded by the J. Walter Thompson Company for the railroad as a part of the railroad's "There's No Stopping Us" advertising campaign. It eventually made its way onto the Mark I Video program titled Rails to Roanoke in 1987. On September 1, 1981, the N&W acquired Illinois Terminal Railroad. The N&W was also a major investor in Piedmont Airlines.

=== Becoming part of the Norfolk Southern Corporation ===
In 1980, the profitable N&W teamed up with the Southern Railway, another profitable company, to form the Norfolk Southern Corporation and it paved the way for today's Norfolk Southern Railway (formerly the Southern Railway) to compete more effectively with CSX Transportation, itself a combination of smaller railroads in the eastern half of the United States.

Today, former N&W trackage remains a vital portion of the Norfolk Southern Railway, a Fortune 500 company. The headquarters of the Norfolk Southern Railway and the parent Norfolk Southern Corporation are now located in Atlanta, Georgia.

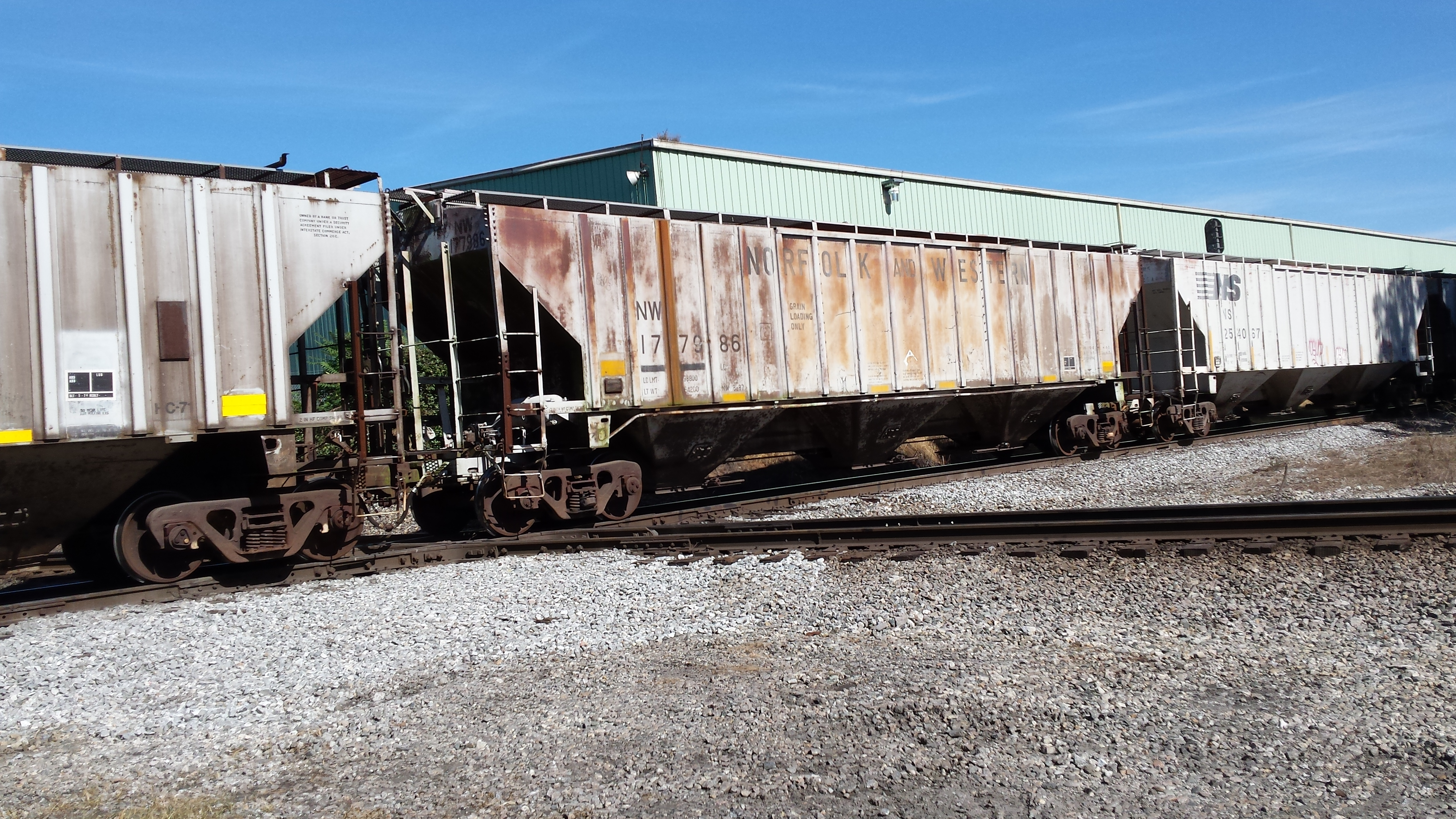
It is still common to see various former N&W freight cars on the rails. This N&W 3-bay covered hopper was photographed in 2018.

== Passenger operations ==
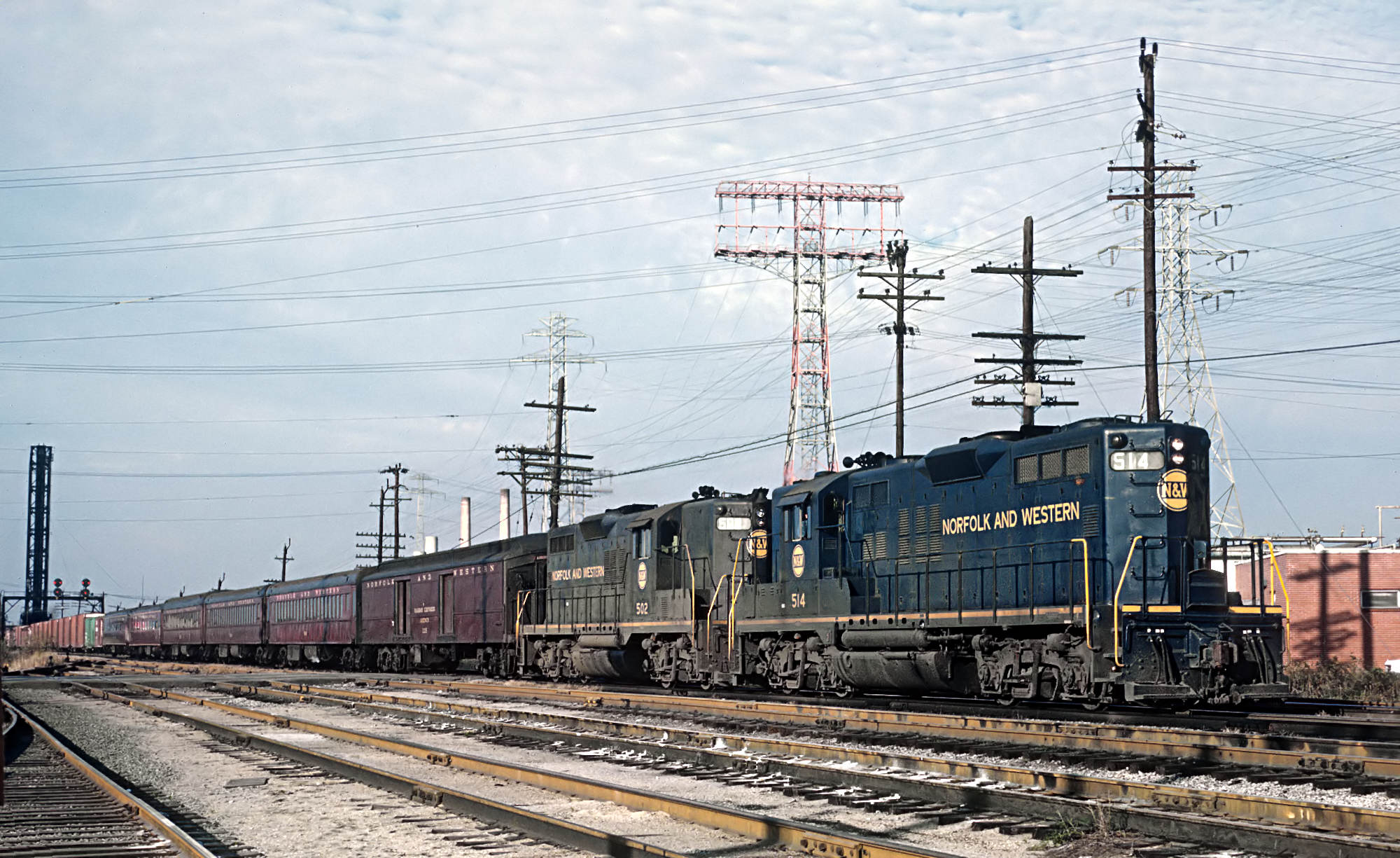
The Pocahontas leaving Norfolk on November 24, 1968

While the Powhatan Arrow (all-coach, Norfolk–Cincinnati/Columbus) was the N&W's flagship passenger train, sporting a regal Tuscan red livery with golden yellow trim and hauled by a J Class 4-8-4 Northern Type steam locomotive, the railroad also operated a number of other passenger trains. These include:

- The Cavalier (coaches and Pullmans, Norfolk–Cincinnati/Columbus).
- The Pocahontas (coaches and Pullmans, Norfolk–Cincinnati/Columbus).

The N&W also participated in five inter-line passenger trains:

- Trains 1 and 2 (Roanoke–Hagerstown, Maryland) which continued in a pool arrangement with the Pennsylvania Railroad from Hagerstown to Harrisburg to New York via North Philadelphia. This allowed for a trip from western Virginia to New York, bypassing Washington, D.C. and Baltimore. In contrast with other N&W trains from south of Roanoke which traveled east from Roanoke, this overnight train continued north from Roanoke along the Shenandoah Valley Route, via Waynesboro, VA. Sleeping car passengers would be able to take the trip continuously, without a change of coach in Harrisburg. This service ended on June 10, 1962.
- Cannon Ball (New York – Norfolk in conjunction with Pennsylvania Railroad, Richmond, Fredericksburg and Potomac Railroad, and the Atlantic Coast Line Railroad).
- Birmingham Special (New York – Birmingham, Alabama in conjunction with the Pennsylvania Railroad and Southern Railway).
- The Pelican (New York – New Orleans in conjunction with the Pennsylvania Railroad and Southern Railway).
- The Tennessean (New York – Memphis in conjunction with the Pennsylvania Railroad and Southern Railway).

The last three were unusual in that the Southern Railway operated the trains, either side of the N&W stretch between Lynchburg and Bristol.

The Norfolk-bound trains arrived at Norfolk Terminal Station, which also served as the N&W company offices.

== Steam locomotive types on the Norfolk and Western ==
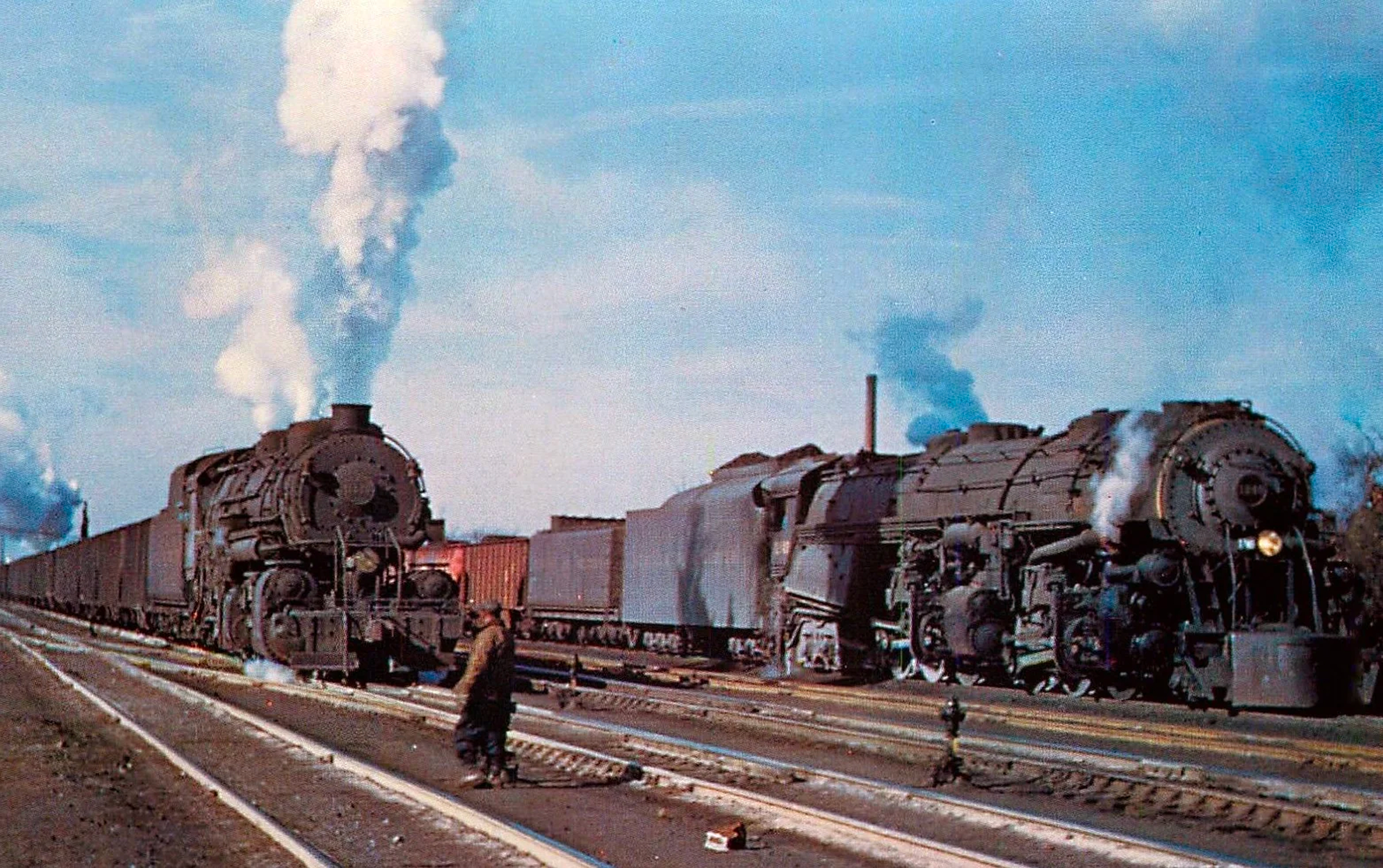
N&W class A No. 1240 with a class Z1b at Norfolk, c. 1956

- Class A: 2-6-6-4 simple articulated Top Speed: 70 mph (110 km/h)
- Class Y1 though Y6b: 2-8-8-2 Mallet Top Speed: 60 mph (97 km/h)
- Class J: 4-8-4 Top Speed: 110 mph (180 km/h)
- Classes K1 and K2: 4-8-2 Mountain Top Speed: 80 mph (130 km/h)
- Classes M, M1, and M2: 4-8-0 Mastodon Top Speed: 55 mph (89 km/h)
- Class S1: 0-8-0 switchers Top Speed: 50 mph (80 km/h)
- Class Z1: 2-6-6-2 Top Speed: 60 mph (97 km/h)
- Class E1: 4-6-2 Top Speed: 65 mph (105 km/h)
- Class E2: 4-6-2 Top Speed: 70 mph (110 km/h)
- Class W: 2-8-0 Top Speed: 45 mph (72 km/h)

== Surviving steam locomotives ==
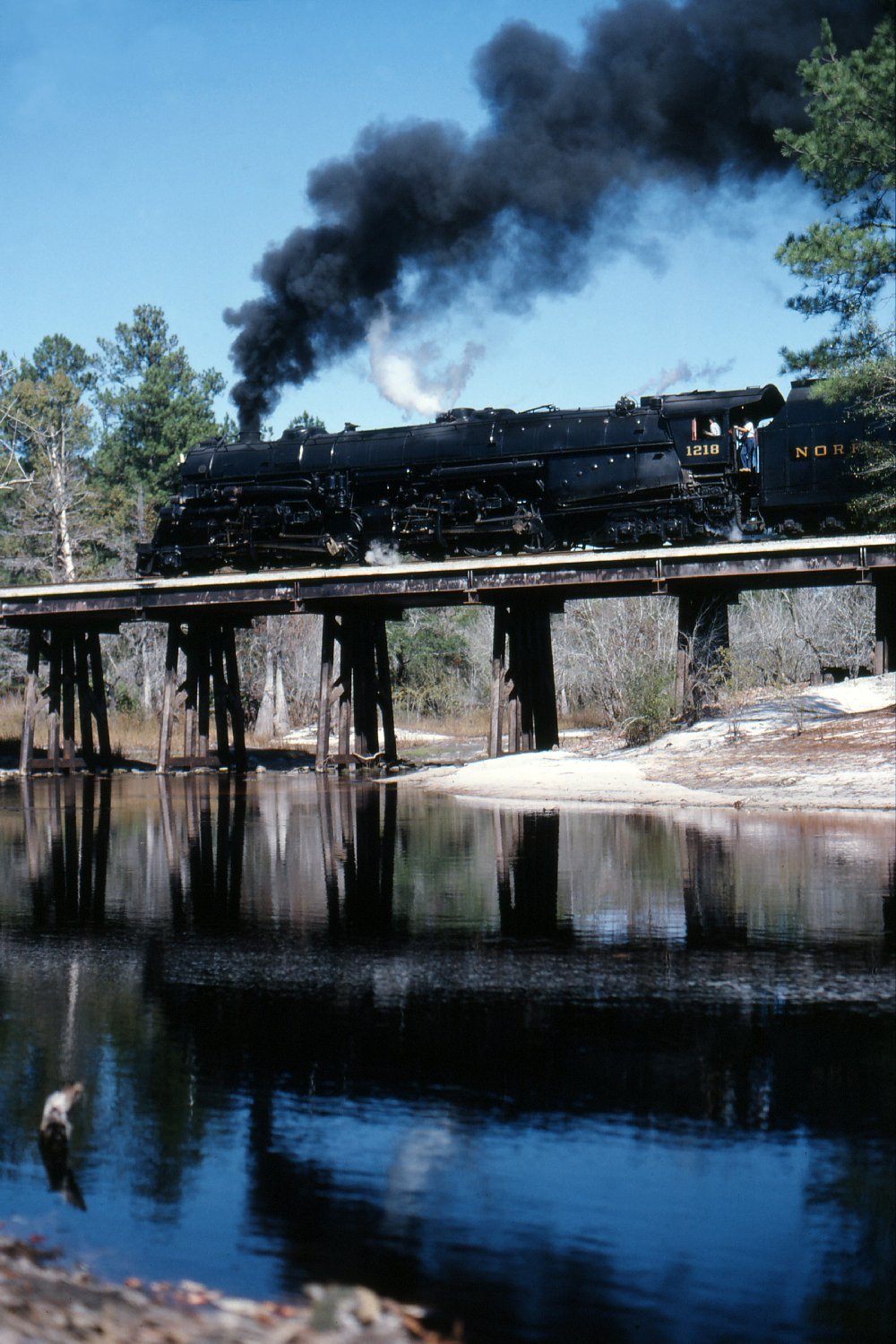
No. 1218 photographed crossing a trestle on an excursion trip in 1987

The N&W had run excursion trains since its first days of passenger traffic, and deliberately powered them with steam engines after 1960, when most other trains had been switched to diesels. The excursion trains were powered by several of the N&W's famous steam locomotives, including J class No. 611 and A class No. 1218. The practice continued after the 1982 merger, under the first president of the merged Norfolk Southern, Robert B. Claytor, but was finally halted in 1994.

Today, No. 1218 is on static display at the Virginia Museum of Transportation in Roanoke, Virginia; No. 611 has been restored to working order for the VMT by the North Carolina Transportation Museum; class Y6a No. 2156 has been brought to Roanoke from the National Museum of Transportation in St. Louis, Missouri; and class M No. 475 continues to operate at the Strasburg Railroad in Strasburg, Pennsylvania, where No. 611 participated for the "Reunion of Steam" event in fall 2019.

Class M No. 433 survives at the trailhead of the Virginia Creeper in Abingdon, Virginia. The Virginia Creeper runs on the old right-of-way where the Abingdon branch line remains.

Class E2a No. 578 is displayed at the Ohio Railway Museum in Worthington, Ohio.

Four other engines survive known as the Lost Engines of Roanoke; a group of engines that survived in a Roanoke Scrapyard from the late 1950s until all were retrieved in 2009. These four engines included Class W2 2-8-0 No. 917, Class M2s Nos. 1118 and #1134, and Class M2c No. 1151. No. 917 is displayed without a tender in Bellville, Ohio as a display for a restaurant. No. 1118 is owned by the Roanoke Chapter Historical Society without a tender. No. 1134 is displayed in Portsmouth VA at the Railroad Museum of Virginia with a tender. M2c No. 1151 is owned by the Virginia Museum of Transportation and currently sits unrestored with a tender from a class A.

N&W Class Y3a No. 2050 is also preserved at the Illinois Railway Museum in Union, Illinois.

== Presidents of the Norfolk and Western ==
Thousands of men and women worked for the AM&O and NW after the Civil War. Among the leaders were:

- William Mahone
- George F. Tyler
- Henry Fink
- Frederick J. Kimball
- Lucius E. Johnson
- Nicholas D. Maher
- Arthur C. Needles
- William J. Jenks
- Robert H. Smith
- Stuart T. Saunders
- Herman H. Pevler
- John P. Fishwick
- Robert B. Claytor
- Richard F. Dunlap

== Heritage unit ==
As a part of Norfolk Southern's 30th anniversary, the company painted 20 new locomotives into predecessor schemes. NS #8103, a GE ES44AC, was painted into the Norfolk and Western's blue scheme. NS also has SD40 #1580, of N&W heritage, stored at Altoona Works, awaiting restoration to its original N&W colors. In 2024, 1580 was donated to the Roanoke Chapter NHRS.

== See also ==
- Norfolk and Western Railway Company Historic District
- Norfolk and Western Railway Freight Station
- List of Norfolk and Western Railway locomotives
- Norfolk and Western 611 - Class J 4-8-4
- Norfolk & Western 475 – Class M 4-8-0
- Norfolk & Western 1218 – Class A 2-6-6-4
- Norfolk & Western 2156 – Class Y6a 2-8-8-2
- Norfolk and Western class Y6b
- Dinwiddie County Pullman Car

== Notes ==
- N&W System Map 1965
