= 1985–1986 New Bedford fishermen's strike =

1985–1986 labor strike in New Bedford, Massachusetts

- Date: December 26, 1985 – March 1986
- Location: New Bedford, Massachusetts, United States
- Caused by: Disagreements over the terms of a new labor contract
- Goals: To maintain the current revenue shares, expand benefits, require hiring to go through the union
- Methods: Picketing; Strike action
- Result: Many ships return to operation by late February; Union broken, leading to the end of organized labor among the fishermen; Public fish auction closes, replace by private enterprises

Parties
Seafarers International Union of North America	Seafood Producers Association of New Bedford

The 1985–1986 New Bedford fishermen's strike was a labor strike involving fishermen in the port city of New Bedford, Massachusetts, United States. The strike, led by the Seafarers International Union of North America, began on December 26, 1985, after discussions on the terms of a new labor contract fell apart. The strike continued into the next year and involved about 700 of the 1,200 fishermen in the city. The strike ended around March 1986 with mixed results for the union, with a compromised labor contract. However, the strike severely hurt organized labor among the fishermen, with the New Bedford Fishing Heritage Center saying that the strike "[led] to the end of organized labor in the New Bedford fishing fleet".

Situated in a natural harbor on Massachusetts's South Coast, New Bedford developed a strong commercial fishing industry in the early 1900s, becoming a major processing location for sea scallops. During the 1930s and 1940s, a public fish auction was established, and fishermen in the city unionized. By 1985, the Seafarers International Union of North America (SIU) represented about 700 of the 1,200 fishermen in the city and negotiated labor contracts with the shipowners. About 30 owners, representing 100 of the city's 250-ship fishing fleet, were part of the Seafood Producers Association, a trade association whose labor contracts typically set the standard for the entire port. In 1985, the union and association entered negotiations for a new contract. While New Bedford was one of the highest earning ports in the country at the time and had brought in over $100 million in catches last year, 1985 saw a decline in catches. Coupled with increased costs of operating ships, the association requested a change to the contracts that would have seen the shares of revenue from the catches be split equally between the fishermen and the shipowners and captains. However, the union rebuffed, pushing to maintain the current split that favored the fishermen, while also requesting increases in benefits and requiring hiring to take place through the union. After both sides could not come to an agreement, the union went on strike on December 26.

Over the next few days, the union began picketing along the docks, also blocking entry to the auction house, causing fish trading to come to a halt in the city. Over the next few days, several ships began sailing with nonunion crews, and negotiations resumed sporadically under federal mediation in January 1986. During this time, there were several acts of violence, including multiple fires set to buildings and at least two bomb threats, though the union denied any involvement. As the strike continued into February, more and more ships began sailing with both union and nonunion crews, negotiating contracts independently with the union. By late February, most of the ships in New Bedford were in operation again, and several shipowners who were part of the association opted to negotiate independent contracts as well. By this time, multiple sources reported that the strike was winding down. In the aftermath of the strike, organized labor had been severely weakened, and the public auction house was not reopened as business interests instead opened a private operation. A new public auction was later opened in 1994 and as of 2022 was one of the largest public fish auctions in the United States. In 2017, the strike was the subject of a documentary film that was coproduced by the New Bedford Fishing Heritage Center and the New Bedford Whaling National Historical Park.

== Background ==
=== Fishing industry in New Bedford ===
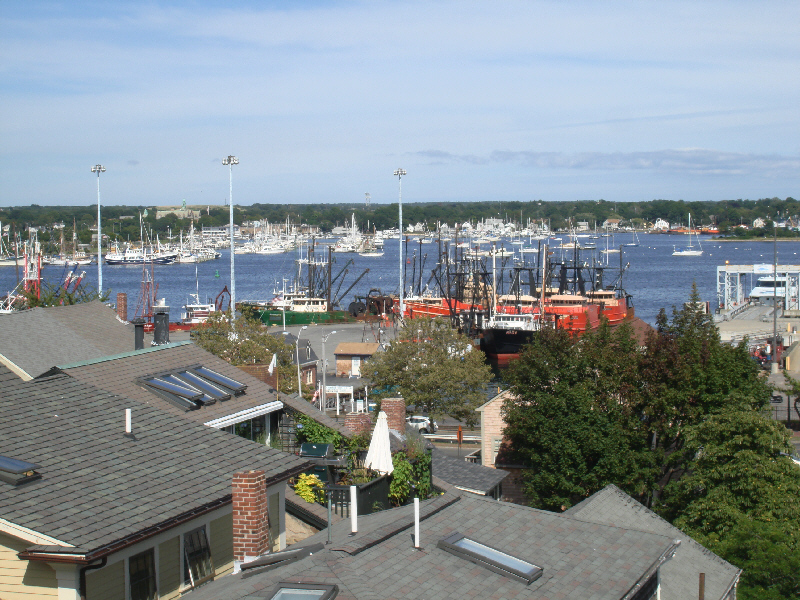
Fishing boats in the New Bedford Harbor, 2008

New Bedford, Massachusetts, is a seaside port city situated at the mouth of the Acushnet River, where it shares a natural harbor with the towns of Acushnet and Fairhaven along the state's South Coast. During the late 1800s and early 1900s, the city had an economy supported by its large whaling and textile industries, though starting in the early 1900s, as these industries went into decline, the city's commercial fishing industry grew. In the early 1900s, the introduction of more powerful diesel engines allowed ships from New Bedford to travel further from the port to Georges Bank, 175 miles (282 km) off the coast of Cape Cod. During this time, the port quickly becomes a major processing location for sea scallops, and shortly after World War II, 80 percent of the sea scallops caught off of the coast of the United States were being unloaded in New Bedford. In the 1930s, a permanent trade union was established amongst the fishermen in the city.

Through the early 1900s, the city was not a major site for the buying and selling of fish, as many of the city's fishermen sold their catches at the Fulton Fish Market in New York City or at the fish market in Boston, which was accessible from New Bedford via the Cape Cod Canal. This began to change through the 1930s, and improvements in refrigeration technology and infrastructure in New Bedford, such as the building of a freezer plant, caused more fishermen to unload their catches in the city. Prior to the 1940s, ship captains would negotiate directly with different merchants in the area to sell their catches. However, in 1941, New Bedford's Seafood Producers Association (Note: Sources vary on the exact spelling of this organization, with different sources using "Producers Association", "Producer's Association", and "Producers' Association".) and the Atlantic Fishermen's Union established the New Bedford Fish Auction. The auction, operated by the trade association of boat owners and the union, allowed for merchants to bid on fishermen's daily catches following a set of rules and regulations. The catches would stay on the boats during the auction, and after the end of the auction day, the captains would either have their catches unloaded to the fish houses of the highest bidders. The auction was popular with the merchants and fishermen, and in September 1947, the city government added an addition to the Wharfinger Building to permanently house it. By municipal law, the auction was to be public, and it was the only place where fish sales could legally take place in New Bedford.

=== Labor disagreements ===
By the 1980s, New Bedford had become one of the most lucrative fishing ports in the United States, regularly bringing in about $90 million in fish per year. In 1984, high scallop prices caused this value to increase to over $100 million (equivalent to $310,000,000 in 2025). However, in 1985, New Bedford's fishermen saw a decline in catches due to several reasons, including a decline in fish populations due to overfishing in the region, the closure of almost 30,000 acres (12,000 ha) of shellfish locations due to pollution, and a ruling by the International Court of Justice that limited American fishermen's access to Georges Bank. Around this time, fishermen in the city were represented by the International Brotherhood of Teamsters Local 59, but in March 1985, they switched their affiliation to the Seafarers International Union of North America (SIU). That same month, the labor contract that the Teamsters had established with the producers' association expired, but both sides agreed to continue to honor the contract's provisions while discussions on a new contract were underway. At the time, the SIU represented about 750 of the city's 1,200 fishermen. (Note: This value for both the number of unionized fishermen and the total number of fishermen in New Bedford comes from a December 30, 1985, release from United Press International (UPI). However, sources vary on both the number of unionized fishermen and the percentage of New Bedford's fishermen that were union members. Various reports from UPI and the Associated Press (AP) in December 1985 and January 1986 also give a value of 750 fishermen, but the AP further stated that this number constituted about a third of the total number of fishermen in New Bedford. Other UPI reports gave values of about 650 fishermen, equal to roughly half of the city's total fishermen, 700 fishermen, "600 of the 1,200 fishermen in New Bedford", and "[a]bout half of New Bedford's 1,200 fishermen". Meanwhile, a January 5, 1986, article in The New York Times by reporter Matthew L. Wald quoted an official of the SIU as saying that the union represented roughly 800 fishermen.) At this same time, the Seafood Producers Association was composed of 32 members, representing 110 ships. The total fishing fleet for New Bedford at the time was about 250 ships. Contracts negotiated between the union and the association, while not binding for non-association ships, usually set the standard for the entire port.

Going into December 1985, the union and producers' association were negotiating the terms of a new labor contract. Of chief concern to both parties were the division of proceeds from catches. Under a system established a decade prior, fishermen who worked on draggers would receive 58 percent of the proceeds from their ship's catch, while scallop fishermen received 68 percent. (Note: The figure of 68 percent for scallop fishers comes from United Press International, while the Associated Press and The New York Times reported that the figure was actually 64 percent.) For draggers where crews paid their own expenses, as established in the Teamsters contract, the fishermen would receive 59 percent, while scallopers were already required to cover all expenses such as food and fuel. The remainder of the profits from the catches went to the shipowners and the skippers. According to the union, these rates had been in place for the past 25 years. The shipowners wanted to increase their share of the profits from the catch and requested that both of the rates for the fishermen be reduced to 50 percent, which the union rejected. Another point of contention concerned hiring, with the union wanting all fishermen sailing on the producers' association ships to come from the union hiring hall, while the shipowners wanted the skippers to have final say on the ship's crews. The union also sought to move the location of the fishermen's pension and welfare funds, and they requested a 9 percent increase in benefits and catch shares over the next three years, down from an initial proposed 11 percent at the beginning of the discussions. Additionally, the union wanted the fishermen to be considered employees of the shipowners they worked for, which would require the owners to pay half of the fishermen's Social Security tax. The shipowners rebuffed the union's requests, arguing that a combination of poor catches in the preceding months and increased costs of operating their ships, such as insurance, had hurt them economically, and offered to share their records with the union to prove this. With discussions at a standstill, negotiations ended on December 16, with union leaders authorizing a vote for strike action, which passed unanimously on December 26. This would be the first strike amongst the fishermen in New Bedford since a two-month labor dispute in 1973.

== Course of the strike ==
The strike began on December 26. According to David Barnet, an attorney for the producers' association, not many ships were in operation during that time of year, and concerning the labor dispute, he said, "During the winter months, it's cheaper to tie up than give in to demands". At the beginning of the strike, shipowners stated to the union that they may replace striking fishermen with nonunion workers, with the SIU accusing the shipowners of union busting. Additionally, the union stated that many nonunion fishermen were in support of the strike and the union's efforts. The Seafood Workers Union and the Fish Lumpers Union, which represented about 250 seafood processing plant employees and fish-handlers, respectively, stated that their members would be free to honor the picket line in solidarity with the SIU, while the Teamsters announced that their members in New Bedford would remain working. A union representative on the first day of the strike stated that they were willing to enter back into negotiations with the shipowners at any time, though shipowners stated that they would only restart negotiations with a federal mediator.

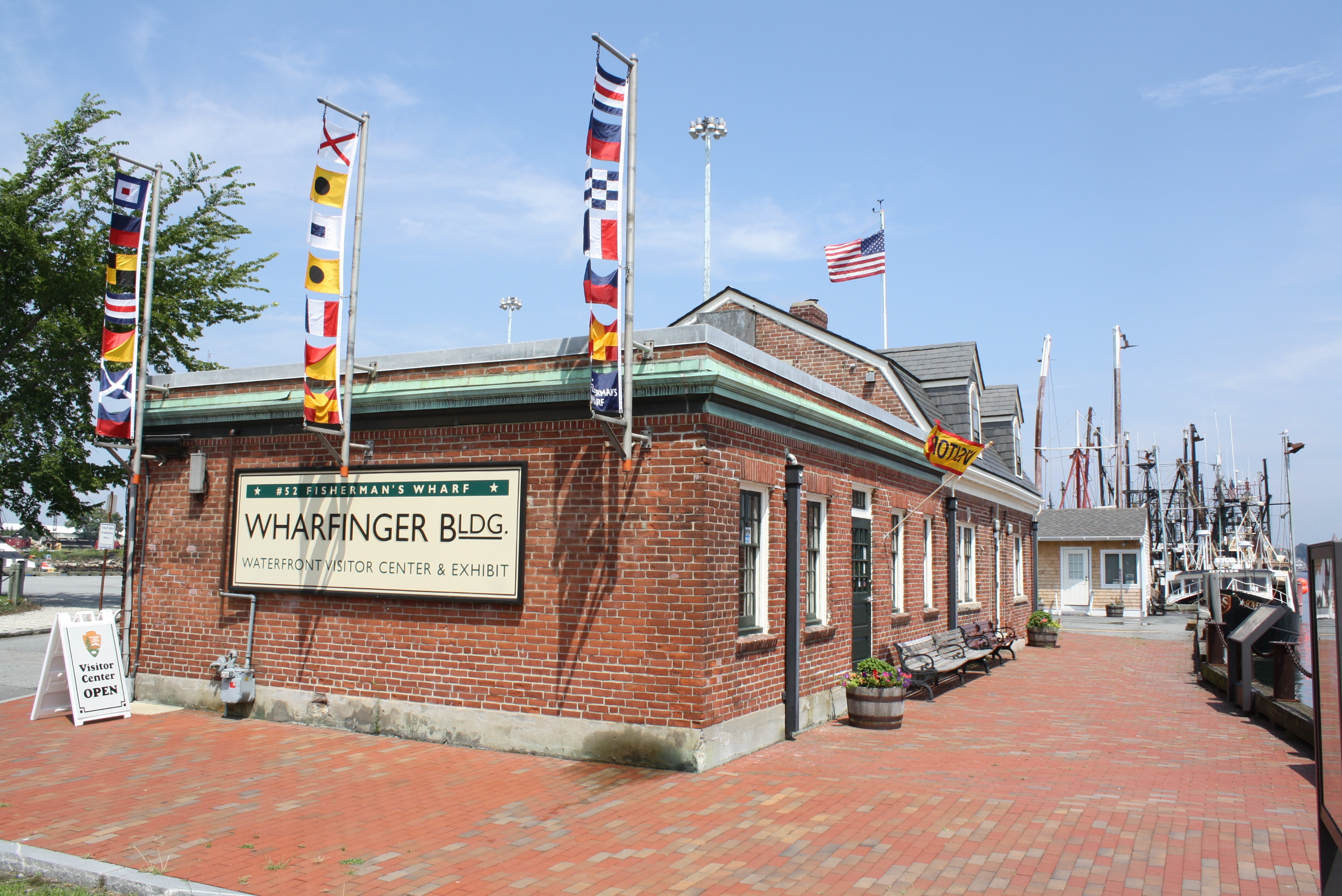
During the strike, picketers blocked access to the Wharfinger Building (pictured 2010), preventing trading from occurring.

On Friday, December 27, about 150 strikers picketed at 26 locations around the harbor, including at piers in New Bedford and nearby Fairhaven. On that day, only one ship's catch was processed, with union members stating that they would not allow any more processing to take place without further demonstrations starting that Monday. Referencing the demonstrations, Jack Caffey, vice president of the SIU, stated, "We're not prone to violence, but I can't say what individuals will do". At the time, another plant in New Bedford was operating with fish trucked in from Boston. Also on Friday, Austin Skinner, a federal mediator, stated that he would begin holding mediation services between the union and association some time after January 1, 1986. The following day, the Associated Press reported on the strike, with a member of the local chamber of commerce stating that the strike could cost the local economy $1 million per day. That Monday, December 30, about 250 picketers marched around the Wharfinger Building and prevented traders from entering, shutting down the auction. A day prior, police had investigated a fire that had charred the door to the building, and while the authorities stated that the fire had been set, union members denied any involvement, with some stating that the fire was set to damage the union's image. The fire did not damage the building's structure. For the next several days, 150 to 200 picketers would continue to block access to the auction house, preventing trading.

On January 3, Skinner stated that both sides had agreed to mediation for the following day, Saturday, January 4, stating that further talks could be held on Sunday as well. On January 9, the New Bedford – Fairhaven Bridge, a moveable bridge that spans the harbor, was closed for two hours after the Massachusetts Department of Public Works received a bomb threat from a caller who claimed that he had planted a bomb because nonunion fishing boats from New Bedford were selling their catches in Fairhaven. No bomb was discovered by investigators, and the union denied any knowledge of or connection to the caller. By this point in the strike, fishing boats with nonunion crews were actively fishing from New Bedford, with about a dozen ships departing on January 8 and an additional one departing the following day. For the next few weeks, some of the nonunion ships sailed under police protection. Also at this time, the union filed a complaint with the National Labor Relations Board, stating that the shipowners were not recognizing fishermen who had joined that union since the strike began as legitimate union members and had fired them. Over the next several days, the two sides participated in discussions, with the shipowners proposing adjusted rates for fishermen, with scallopers taking 53 percent of the catch while paying all expenses, 51 percent for draggers who shared the costs of the fishing trips, such as food and fuel, and 53 percent for draggers who fully covered these expenses. The union rejected these proposals and was also firm in requesting a grievance procedure for fishermen who believed they were unfairly fired, which the shipowners rejected. As a result, negotiations broke down on January 14. By this time, about 30 nonunion ships had left the harbor to fish, while the strike was costing approximately $146,000 per week in unemployment benefits. On January 24, discussions resumed, but ended that same day after the shipowners rejected a union proposal. On January 27, tensions were further exacerbated after another bomb threat had been made, this time concerning a nonunion ship, and a fire damaged two waterfront businesses, with damages of about $240,000. The union denied involvement in either case, but the police instituted more security measures around the wharves, including having more officers on patrol.

On January 29, attorneys for New Bedford sought a court injunction to prevent the auctioning of fish that was taking place in New Bedford outside of the Wharfinger Building, which was the only location specified by the city where fish sales could occur. The auction participants responded that the move came after intimidation from the union prevented them from using the Wharfinger Building. On February 4, the shipowners rejected a request from the union that would have seen the fishermen return to work in exchange for agreeing to binding arbitration, with the producers' association stating that they had already given the union their final offer. On February 10, about 200 members of the SIU voted to ratify a contract that one union representative said was "pretty close" in terms to the one they had proposed to the producers' association with 20 shipowners who were independent of the Seafood Producers Association. On February 14, a confrontation occurred between union and nonunion fishermen aboard a ship off the coast of Nantucket resulted in a Coast Guard cutter responding and allowing a nonunion fisherman aboard for medical aid. By this time, the union had contracts in place with 37 independent shipowners.

According to a union representative, at a meeting on February 19, 12 of the producers' association 32 members voted to break with the association and negotiate independently with the union, agreeing to a contract wherein the former 58 percent catch guaranteed to fishermen was reduced to only 55 percent. By February 23, the union reported that 55 of the 250 ships in New Bedford had signed contracts with the union, which was continuing to hold daily picketing at the docks. Over the next few days, most of New Bedford's fishing ships were back in service, with some operating under new contracts and others operating under the terms of the old contract, and the union stated that 15 of the producers' associations had signed independent contracts with the union. According to the SIU's official organ, the Seafarers Log, by March, about 300 union members were back to work as more ships signed contracts.

== Aftermath ==
The strike had the effect of temporarily stopping fish trading in New Bedford, but business interests in the city succeeded in establishing a private auction system, with the earlier law requiring the auction to be public ruled unconstitutional. Ultimately, the strike led to the closure of the public fish market, though the Fish Lumpers Union established an outdoor auction in the late 1980s, and in 1994, a new public auction was established. By 2021, this new auction, the Buyers and Sellers Exchange (BASE), was the largest public fish auction on the east coast of the United States and handled over half of the scallops caught in the country. Another impact of the strike was in damaging organized labor among New Bedford's fishermen. In 2022, Will Sennott, a local journalist, wrote for ProPublica that "the union was broken" by the strike, a sentiment echoed by the New Bedford Fishing Heritage Center, a local nonprofit historical society. The organization stated that the strike "[led] to the end of organized labor in the New Bedford fishing fleet". By 2022, the fishermen in New Bedford were not represented by a union. In 2017, the strike was the subject of a documentary film, Community Conversation: Remembering the Fishermen’s Strike of 1985-86, which was presented as a coproduction of the New Bedford Fishing Heritage Center and the New Bedford Whaling National Historical Park. As of the 2022, New Bedford remains one of the highest earning fishing ports in the United States.
