= Fairhaven Branch Railroad =

Overview
- Status: Abandoned
- Owner: Fairhaven Branch Railroad 1854-1861; New Bedford & Taunton Railroad 1861-1879; Boston, Clinton, Fitchburg and New Bedford Railroad 1879-1883; Old Colony Railroad 1883-1893; New York, New Haven and Hartford Railroad 1893-1953
- Locale: Southeastern Massachusetts
- Termini: Fairhaven, Massachusetts; West Wareham, Massachusetts
- Stations: 5

Service
- System: New York, New Haven and Hartford Railroad
- Operator(s): Fairhaven Branch Railroad 1854-1861; New Bedford & Taunton Railroad 1861-1879; Boston, Clinton, Fitchburg and New Bedford Railroad 1879-1883; Old Colony Railroad 1883-1893; New York, New Haven and Hartford Railroad 1893-1953

History
- Opened: 1854
- Closed: 1953 (Fairhaven–Marion); 1976 (Marion–Tremont)

Technical
- Line length: 15.1 miles (24.3 km)
- Track gauge: 4 ft 8 1/2 in (1,435 mm) standard gauge

The Fairhaven Branch Railroad was a short-line railroad in Massachusetts. It ran from West Wareham on the Cape Cod main line of the Old Colony Railroad, southwest to Fairhaven, a town across the Acushnet River from New Bedford.

== History ==
The Fairhaven Branch Railroad (FBRR) was incorporated in 1849, chartered in 1851, and built from 1852 to 1854. The New Bedford and Taunton Railroad bought the line in 1861, including its ferry terminals at New Bedford and Fairhaven, which afforded connections to Woods Hole and Martha's Vineyard via steamship. The railroad was merged into the Old Colony Railroad in 1883, four years after the Old Colony leased the Boston, Clinton, Fitchburg and New Bedford Railroad, the successor to the New Bedford and Taunton.

Notable among the early employees of the FBRR was Henry Huttleston Rogers. Born in 1840, he was the son of a former ship's captain and grocer in Fairhaven. After graduating from high school in 1857, "Hen" Rogers hired on with the Fairhaven Branch Railroad as an expressman and brakeman. He worked for three or four years, carefully saving what he could from his meager earnings. Eventually, Henry Rogers rose within the growing petroleum industry to become one of the three key men in John D. Rockefeller's Standard Oil trust.

On March 1, 1893 the New York, New Haven and Hartford Railroad (better known as the "New Haven") leased the massive Old Colony system, which by then included the Boston and Providence Railroad and everything substantially east of it, as well as long branches northwest to Fitchburg and Lowell. Along with the lease of the New England Railroad in 1898, this gave the New Haven a virtual monopoly on rail transport in New England south of the Boston and Albany Railroad.

=== Abandonment ===
Beginning in the 1920s, automobiles and improved highways began to provide major competition to the New Haven. The company began cutback on operations of many branch lines. The New Haven's freight operations declined on the Fairhaven Branch. The railroad tried a couple of times in the 1940s to end service and abandon the Fairhaven Branch, but vocal shippers protested. Finally, in 1953, the Interstate Commerce Commission (ICC) formally granted the abandonment.

The Fairhaven Branch was formally abandoned between Fairhaven and Marion on April 2, 1953. Between 1953 and 1968, the New Haven moved boxcars and covered hoppers of sand from the WHIBCO sand pit in Marion. In 1969, the Penn Central Railroad, created out of a merger between the New Haven, New York Central and Pennsylvania Railroads, took over operations of the New Haven and hauled the loads of sand the 2.5 miles between the sand pit and Tremont Junction, where they would be picked up by the Cape Cod local freight. This continued until 1973, when the Penn Central abandoned the rest of the line to Tremont.

On March 7, 1992, a passenger excursion run by the Cape Cod Railroad ran down a short portion of the overgrown and dilapidated Fairhaven Branch. The train was only able to go so far because of dense overgrowth and poor track conditions. This would be the last passenger train on the Fairhaven Branch, and the last train the branch would ever see.

=== Trail conversion ===
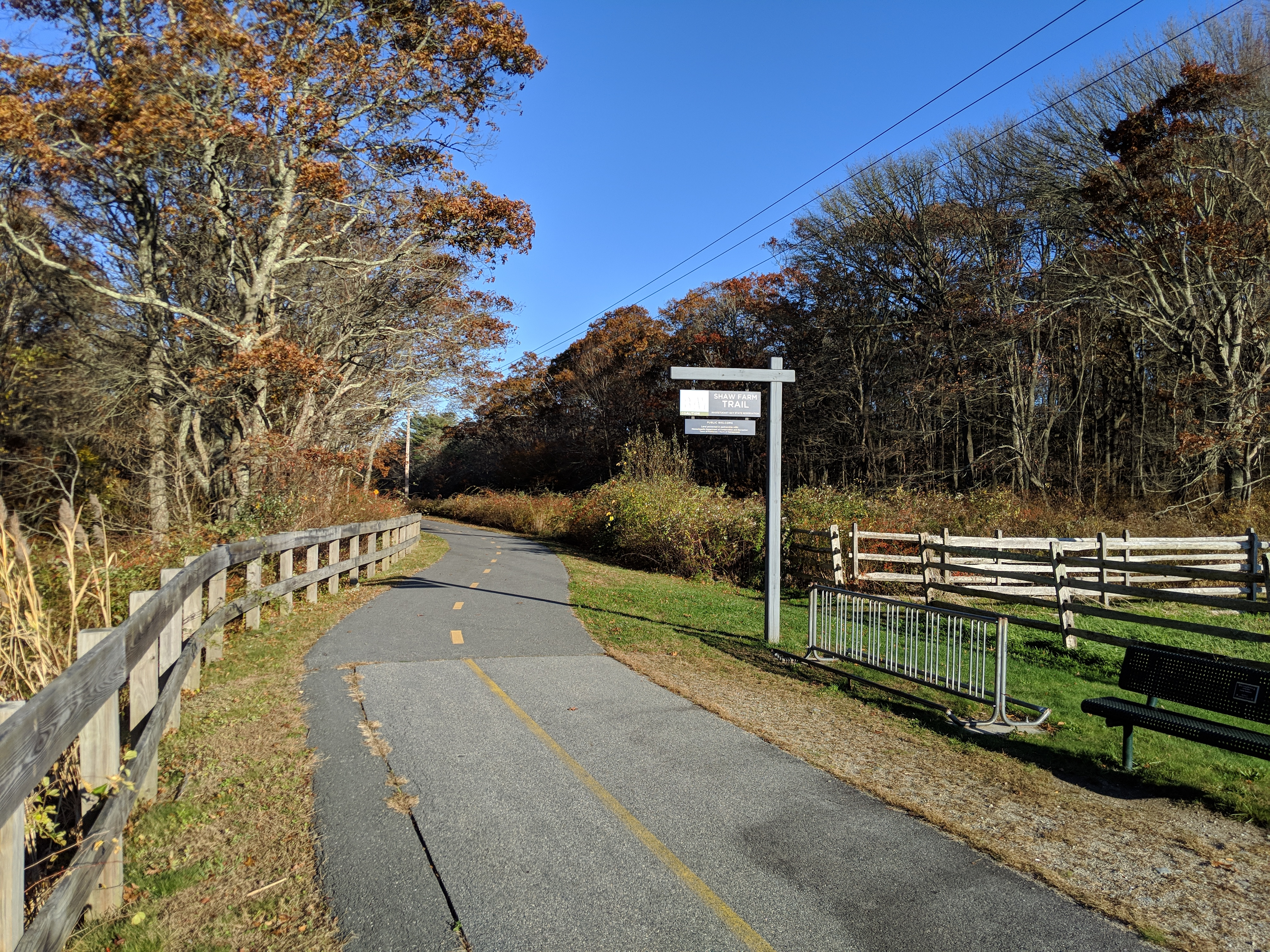
The east end of the Phoenix Rail Trail

Proposals to convert the line to a rail trail began in the 1970s. In 1996, a local resident built a narrow wooden bridge across the outlet channel of Eel Pond in Mattapoisett, enabling use of a 0.5-mile (0.80 km) section of the former right-of-way for recreation. He and others built a series of replacement bridges across the widening channel, with the last completed in 2010. In 1999, 3.1 miles (5.0 km) of the former line from the Fairhaven terminus to the Mattapoisett town line was converted to the Phoenix Rail Trail (named after nearby Fort Phoenix). The first 1 mile (1.6 km) of the Mattapoisett Rail Trail was completed in 2010, extending the trail to Mattapoisett Neck Road. That year, Old Colony Regional Vocational Technical High School students rebuilt the bridge over the Mattapoisett River, allowing use of a further 0.4 miles (0.64 km) of unpaved right-of-way.

In January 2019, the state received a $9 million federal CMAQ grant to fund construction of the next 1.28 miles (2.06 km) in Mattapoisett from Mattapoisett Neck Road to Depot Street. In February 2019, MassDOT awarded a $7 million contract for the construction, with notice to proceed given in late March. The cost of the section was significantly higher than most rail trail construction due to the environmental difficulty of constructing a trail through sensitive wetlands. It opened in April 2023 after a delay due to repairs to a boardwalk section.

The Marion Pathway, constructed largely on the railroad right-of-way, was planned to be completed from Point Road through Marion Center to the Mattapoisett town line in 2021. Mattapoisett plans to complete an additional 0.5-mile (0.80 km) connecting segment to reach Industrial Drive from the Marion line; the state awarded $110,000 in construction funds in July 2020. As of November 2020, the 1.5-mile (2.4 km) section along Industrial Drive was expected to begin construction in spring 2021. The remaining section through Mattapoisett will be completed at a later date. State funding for early planning of Phase 2A in Mattapoisett was awarded in 2022.

== Route ==
The Fairhaven Branch Railroad, about 15 miles long from Fairhaven to Wareham, ran through the center of Fairhaven, past the Atlas Tack Company, through East Fairhaven into Mattapoisett, where the tracks turned north, across the present day U.S. Route 6 and east again, parallel to and just south of the current Interstate 195 (Rhode Island–Massachusetts). The tracks ran through Marion and connected with the main line to Cape Cod at West Wareham/Tremont. Another notable fact is that the line crossed 4 significant rivers, including the Nasketucket River in Fairhaven, the Eel River and Mattapoisett River in Mattapoisett, and the Sippican River in Marion. Part of the former stone arch bridge that once bridged the line over the Sippican River can be seen from I-195.

=== Stations ===
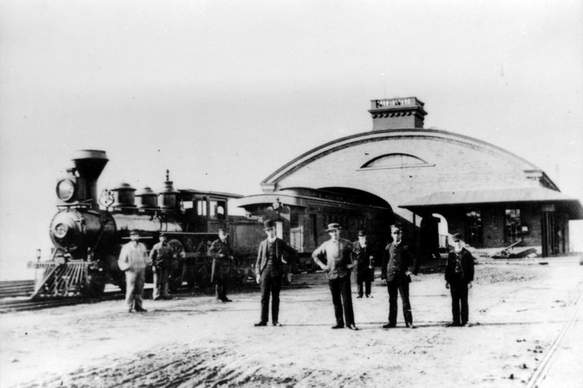
Fairhaven station around 1880. The locomotive pictured is OCRR #7, The "Northern".

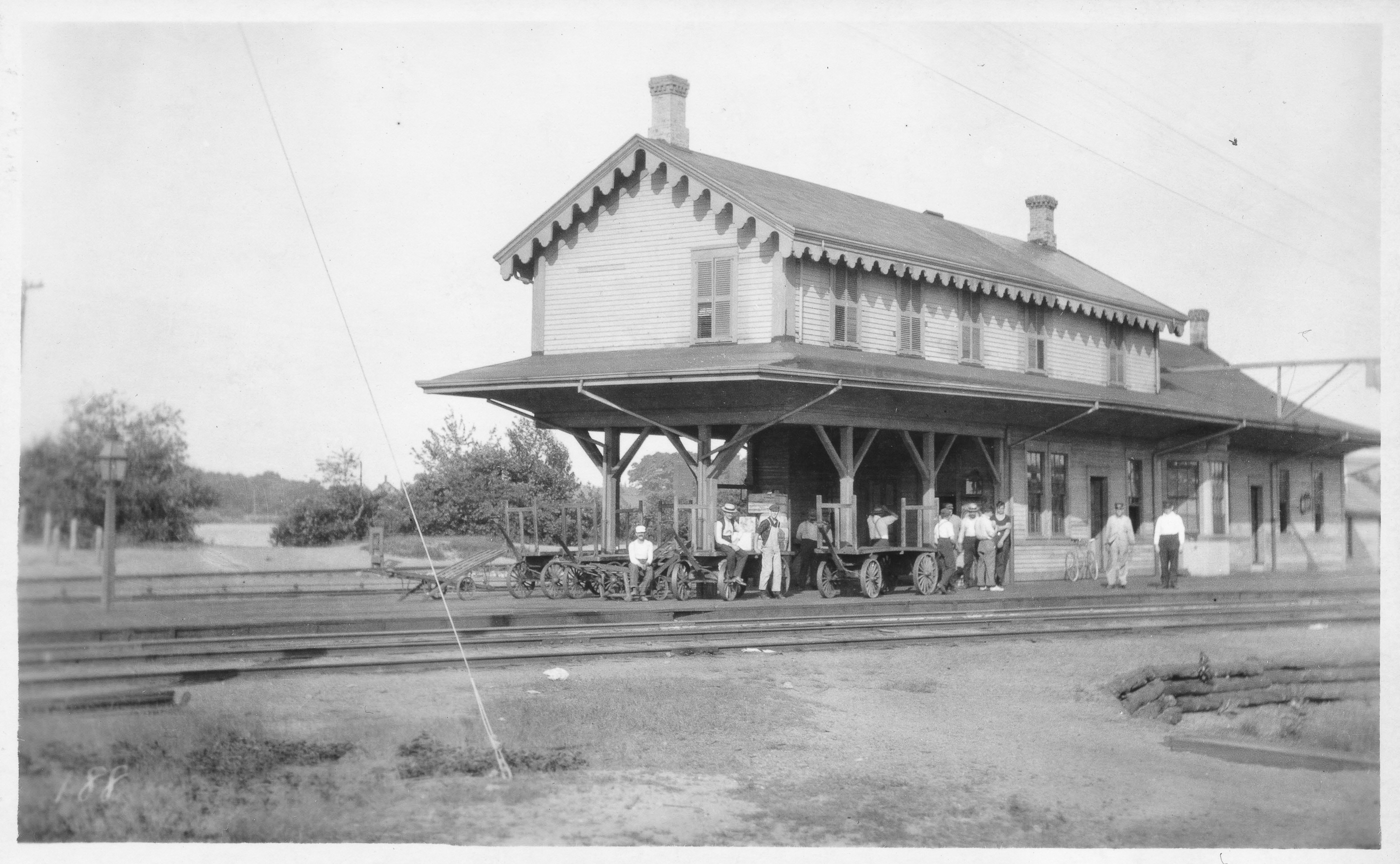
Tremont station at West Wareham

In total, there were 5 stations along the Fairhaven Branch. The first station was the Fairhaven passenger station on Railroad Wharf. This was the main railroad station for Fairhaven. Passengers disembarking from the Fairhaven-New Bedford Ferry that operated from Railroad Wharf (and was owned by the Fairhaven Branch Railroad) and from the Union Street Railway could connect with trains to all points from here. The station also featured a telegraph office with a full-time telegraph officer. Today, the location of the station and the yard at Railroad wharf is occupied by The Woods Hole, Martha's Vineyard and Nantucket Steamship Authority maintenance facility. Prior to that, it was used for the second half of the 20th century by the Hathaway-Braley Company as a wharf.

The second station on this line was a small flag stop station at Sconticut Neck Road. This station was primarily to serve the growing summer population in the late 1800s and early 1900s. Passengers could get off here and take the trolley down Sconticut Neck to Wilbur's Point and other summer colonies on the Neck.

Mattapoisett was the next station on the line. It was located on Railroad Avenue. Today, the station no longer stands, but a stone whistle post and a stone foundation for what was likely a signal stand remain today, sitting in the front yards of homeowners on Railroad Avenue, which was once the right-of-way.

Marion, the next station on the line, is the only stop with a station that survives today. Located on Route 105, it serves the community today as a daycare and restaurant.

The last stop on the line was West Wareham, or more commonly referred to as Tremont. This is where the Fairhaven Branch spurs off from the Cape Cod main line. From here passengers would disembark and await a train to Boston, or Cape Cod, depending on their destination. At this location, trains would drop their passengers; locomotives would (in earlier years) use a turntable to turn around; and from there would pick up the waiting passengers and return down the branch. As an interesting side note, one sign on one side of the passenger station said "West Wareham", while to sign on the opposite side said "Tremont".

The entire line was in Bristol County and Plymouth County, Massachusetts

Locality	Miles to Fairhaven	Station	Lat/long	Notes
Fairhaven	0.00	Fairhaven	41.633653°N 70.905538°W	Western terminus until 1953, which connected with the ferry to New Bedford.
Fairhaven	1.36	Sconticut Neck	41.639041°N 70.881061°W	Only used for a few years at the turn of the century as a flag stop for summer residents. Just north of Sconticut Neck Road at the intersection with the bike path.
Mattapoisett	5.09	Mattapoisett	41.660530°N 70.819842°W	A dirt lot presently covers where Mattapoisett Station once stood. A whitlepost can be seen across the street in a residential front yard on Railroad St.
Marion	9.98	Marion	41.717286°N 70.772055°W	Marion station is the only station that still stands today on the Fairhaven Branch.
Wareham	15.00	West Wareham/Tremont	41.788611°N 70.765556°W	Eastern Terminus

== Railroad customers ==
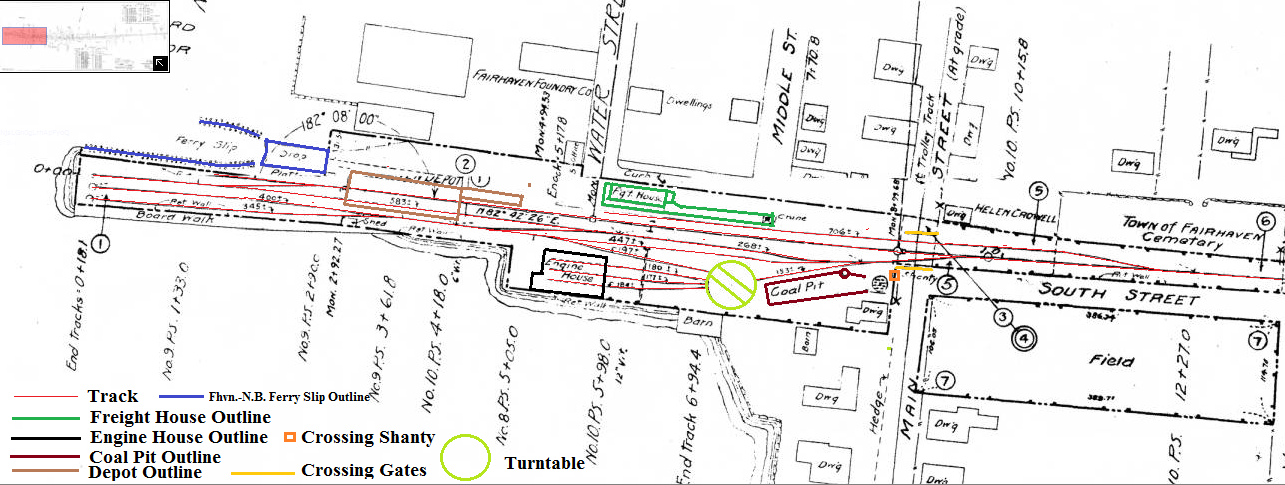
1913 Map of the New Haven Yard at Fairhaven.

The Fairhaven Branch had several customers throughout its existence. Perhaps the largest and most prominent customer of the line was the Atlas Tack Company, which had a total of three sidings that ran up to the North side of the building (two trailing and one facing). From here, tacks, nails and other products made at the factory were shipped out by rail, and materials used in the making of these products such as paints and other chemicals were brought in to the factory until 1953.

Perhaps the second largest customer of the line was the Fairhaven Iron Works, which had a foundry on the corner of Union and Laurel Streets, in Fairhaven Center, near Atlas Tack. From here, iron products were shipped out, although it is uncertain the exact time period during which this took place. In 1893, the iron works burned to the ground, and they moved their operations to the wharf next to Railroad Wharf in Fairhaven. The rail spur which the iron works utilized is visible in a painting of the Fairhaven Center by Arthur Moniz in the Rogers Room of the Millicent Library in Fairhaven.

Several other smaller customers utilized the line to ship their goods, including a coal dealer in Mattapoisett, and a sand pit in Marion, owned by the Whitehead Brothers Company of New Jersey. Whitehead Brothers, also known as WHIBCO, shipped out hopper cars of industrial sand until 1973. Another known customer of the line was the C.P. Washburn Company, which had a feed store on Route 105 in Marion. Some other small customers may have used the line to ship out their goods from the team track in Fairhaven Yard. Here, customers that wished to ship their goods by rail, but did not have a direct rail connection and/or were not near the railroad, could bring their goods to the freight house and have them shipped via rail.
