= Havea =

Havea is a name. Notable people with the name include:

- Havea Hikuleʻo ʻoPulotu, Speaker of the Tongan Legislative Assembly
- Havea Tuʻihaʻangana, Tongan noble
- Havea Tui'ha'ateiho (1910–1962), Tongan nobleman
- Sione ʻAmanaki Havea (1922–2000), Tongan minister
- Soane Havea (born 1981), Tongan rugby union player
- ʻAunofo Havea Funaki, first woman from Tonga to become a licensed sea captain
- Siosateki Havea Mataʻu (born 1979), Tongan rugby union player
