= ʻAunofo Havea Funaki =

Tongan sailor

ʻAunofo Havea Funaki is the first Tongan woman to become a licensed sea captain. The owner of a business that takes tourists to "swim with the whales", she has captained a traditional Polynesian canoe that sailed from the Pacific islands to the USA.

== Early life ==
ʻAunofo Havea Funaki was born in Tu'anuku on the island of Vavaʻu in the Kingdom of Tonga. She had five brothers and three sisters.

== Career ==
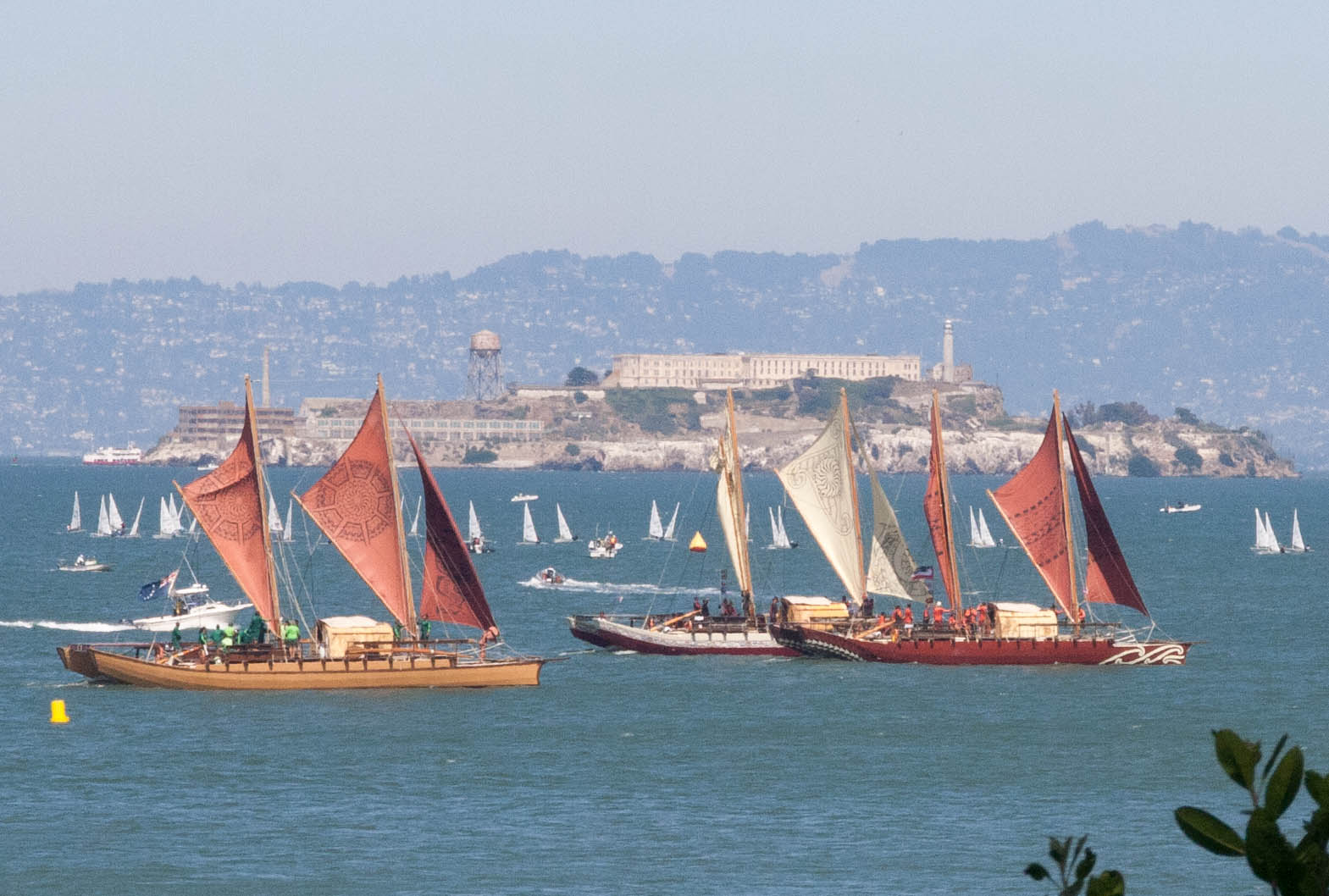
Voyaging canoes (left to right) - Marumaru Atua, Hine Moana, and Haunui - arriving in San Francisco in the Te Mana o Te Moana expedition (2011)

Having been working as a weaver, at age 25, Funaki was given a job of cleaning yachts, something that no other women did. At the time, she had no interest at all in sailing and was only looking for a job. From this she graduated to being a cook on a tourist yacht and was taught how to sail by its owners. Her decision to try to become a captain came about when she realised that she already knew more than a captain she was sailing with as a cook. In 2000, she was the only woman selected, together with 23 men, to take a maritime course in Tonga led by the Royal New Zealand Coast Guard. She finished top of her class. This entitled her to a daytime skipper licence, and she subsequently obtained licences as a boat master and as a yacht captain. Funaki gradually built up her sailing experience to cover monohulls, catamarans, and motorboats. Following a three-month course in 2018 at the Northeast Maritime Institute in Fairhaven, Massachusetts, she became the first female licensed captain in the Kingdom of Tonga and in Polynesia.

In 2011, Funaki joined the Te Mana O Te Moana (The Spirit of the Ocean) voyage of vakas, or traditional outrigger canoes. Crewed by sailors from all over the South Pacific, the canoes were built in New Zealand and sailed from New Zealand to Hawaii, the West Coast of the United States, Cocos Island and the Galápagos Islands. Funaki was the only female captain, sailing on the Hine Moana, with crew from ten different nationalities. In 2012, she captained an all-woman crew sailing in the Polynesian islands. She later had the opportunity to use a vaka for ecotourism purposes in Vavaʻu, to emphasise her concern that too much whale-watching tourism using motorized boats was threatening the whales.

In 2019, Funaki was invited to attend the United Nations World Oceans Day conference in New York, which had the theme of "Gender and Oceans". She spoke of her experiences as a seafarer as well as her role in Vavaʻu as an ecotourism entrepreneur.

== Personal life ==
Funaki is a single mother with five children.
