= Siosateki =

Siosateki is a given name. Notable people with the given name include:

- Siosateki Havea Mataʻu (born 1979), Tongan rugby union player
- Siosateki Tonga (1853–1913), Tongan politician
