= Fairhaven High School and Academy =

Fairhaven High School
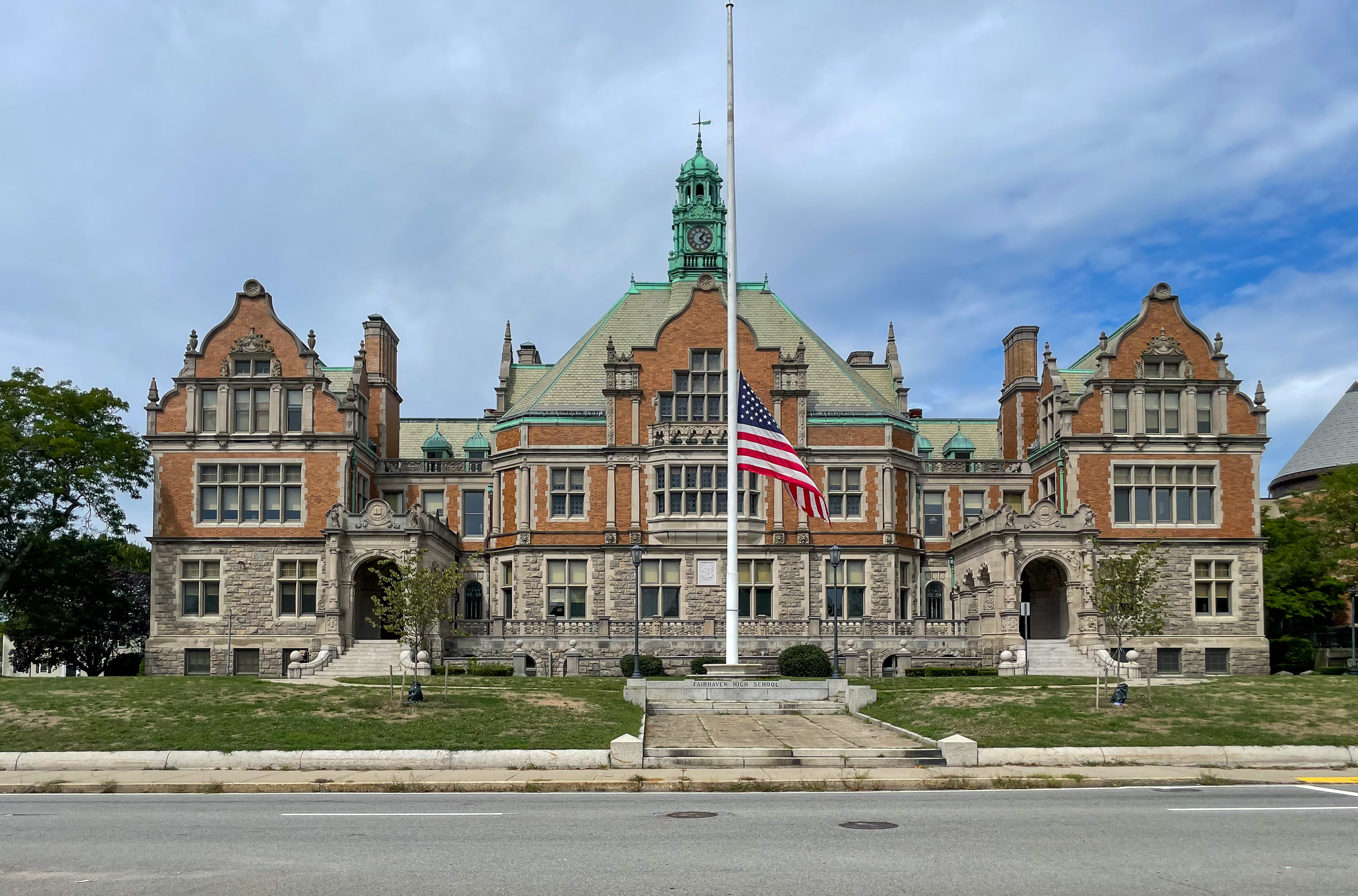
- Main building of Fairhaven High School

Location
- 12 Huttleston Avenue; Fairhaven, Massachusetts 02719; United States; 41°38′35″N 70°54′22″W

Information
- Type: Public high school
- Opened: 1906
- School district: Fairhaven Public Schools
- Superintendent: Tara M. Kohler
- NCES School ID: 250480000642
- Principal: Andrew Kulak
- Teaching staff: 49.32 (on an FTE basis) (2022-23)
- Grades: 9–12
- Enrollment: 633 (2022–23)
- Student to teacher ratio: 12.83 (2022-23)
- Colors: Blue and White
- Song: The Halls of Ivy
- Athletics conference: South Coast Conference
- Mascot: Blue Devil
- Nickname: Blue Devils
- Yearbook: The Huttlestonian
- Communities served: Fairhaven, Acushnet
- Website: www.fairhavenps.org/fhs
- Fairhaven High School and Academy
- U.S. National Register of Historic Places
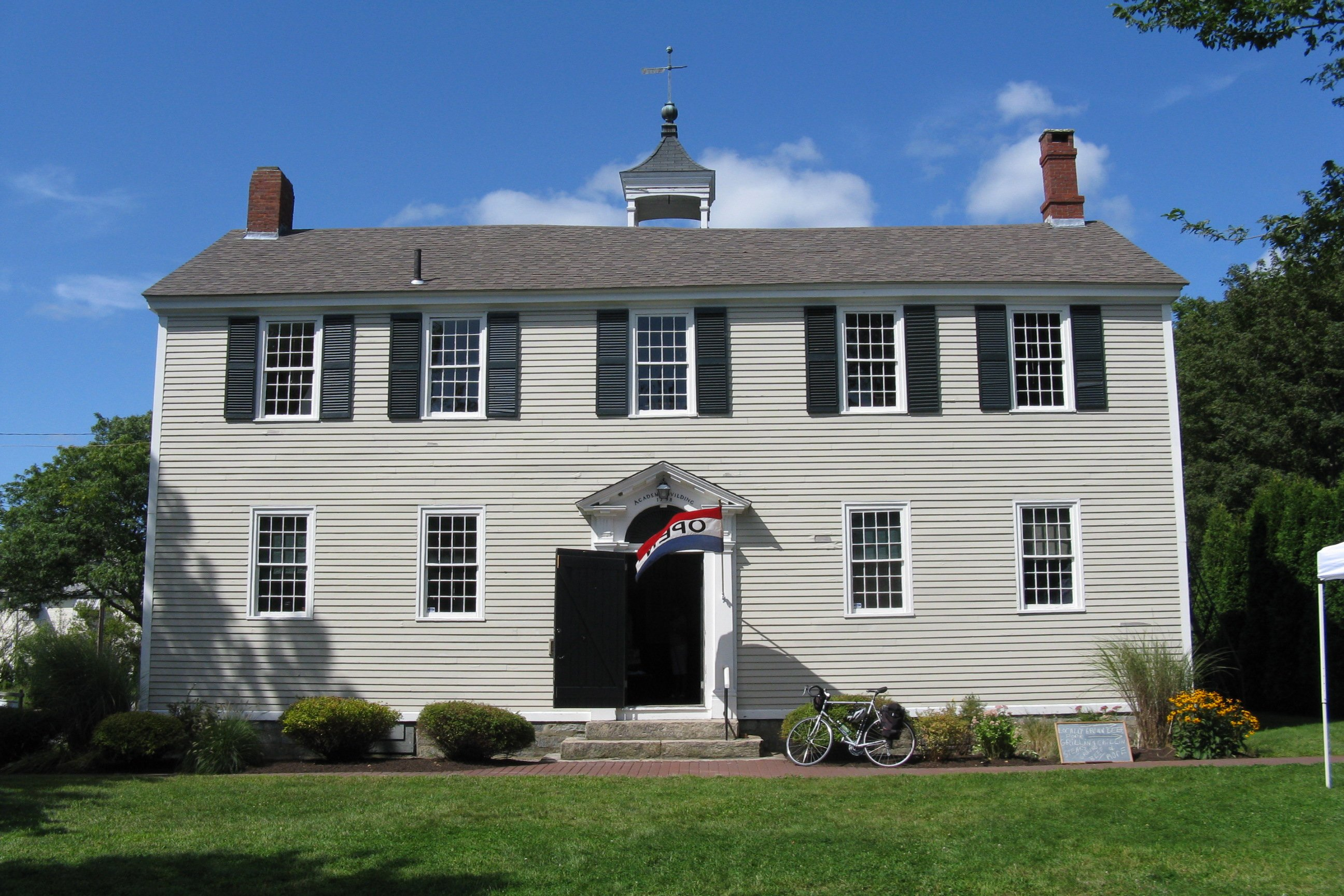
- Built: 1905
- Architect: Charles Brigham
- Architectural style: Late 19th and 20th Century Revivals
- NRHP reference No.: 81000121
- Added to NRHP: January 22, 1981

Fairhaven High School is a public high school in Fairhaven, Massachusetts, United States. The main school building nicknamed "The Castle on the Hill" was built in 1905 and the current addition was added in 1996. The school is the only high school the Fairhaven Public Schools district. It is one of two high schools taking in Acushnet students, along with New Bedford High School of New Bedford Public Schools.

The Fairhaven Academy is a former private secondary school (built 1798) located on the northwest corner of the site. The academy building now serves as the Fairhaven Visitors Center and the Historical Society Museum.

== History ==
The school building was donated in 1906 by Henry Huttleston Rogers, who was one of the key men in John D. Rockefeller's Standard Oil Trust. It was added to the National Register of Historic Places in 1981.

The original octagonal gymnasium became home to the first indoor basketball court in an American high school.

An addition was built behind the original building in the 1930s, which was connected by an underground passageway to the gymnasium. This building was demolished in the 1990s as a new addition on the east side was being constructed. As part of this construction, the old gymnasium was converted into a library. The new addition was completed in 2000.

In 2006 about 100 of the students came from Acushnet. In April 2007 it had 19 Acushnet students about to graduate. Previously the school was only allowed to take up to 25 incoming 9th students from Acushnet, but the limit was removed in 2007 and the new provision was that until the school's student numbers reach 97% of the school's official capacity, any Acushnet high school-aged student is welcome to apply to attend. The anticipated number of incoming 9th graders from Acushnet to begin going to Fairhaven in Fall 2007 was 35.

In 2009 there were fewer than 115 Acushnet students at Fairhaven High, and in 2011 that figure was 98. In 2014 there were 670 students, with 230 Acushnet students. This reflected a trend of Acushnet students choosing Fairhaven over New Bedford High.

The school was used as a filming location for the 2023 film The Holdovers, directed by Alexander Payne. Filming took place in early 2022.

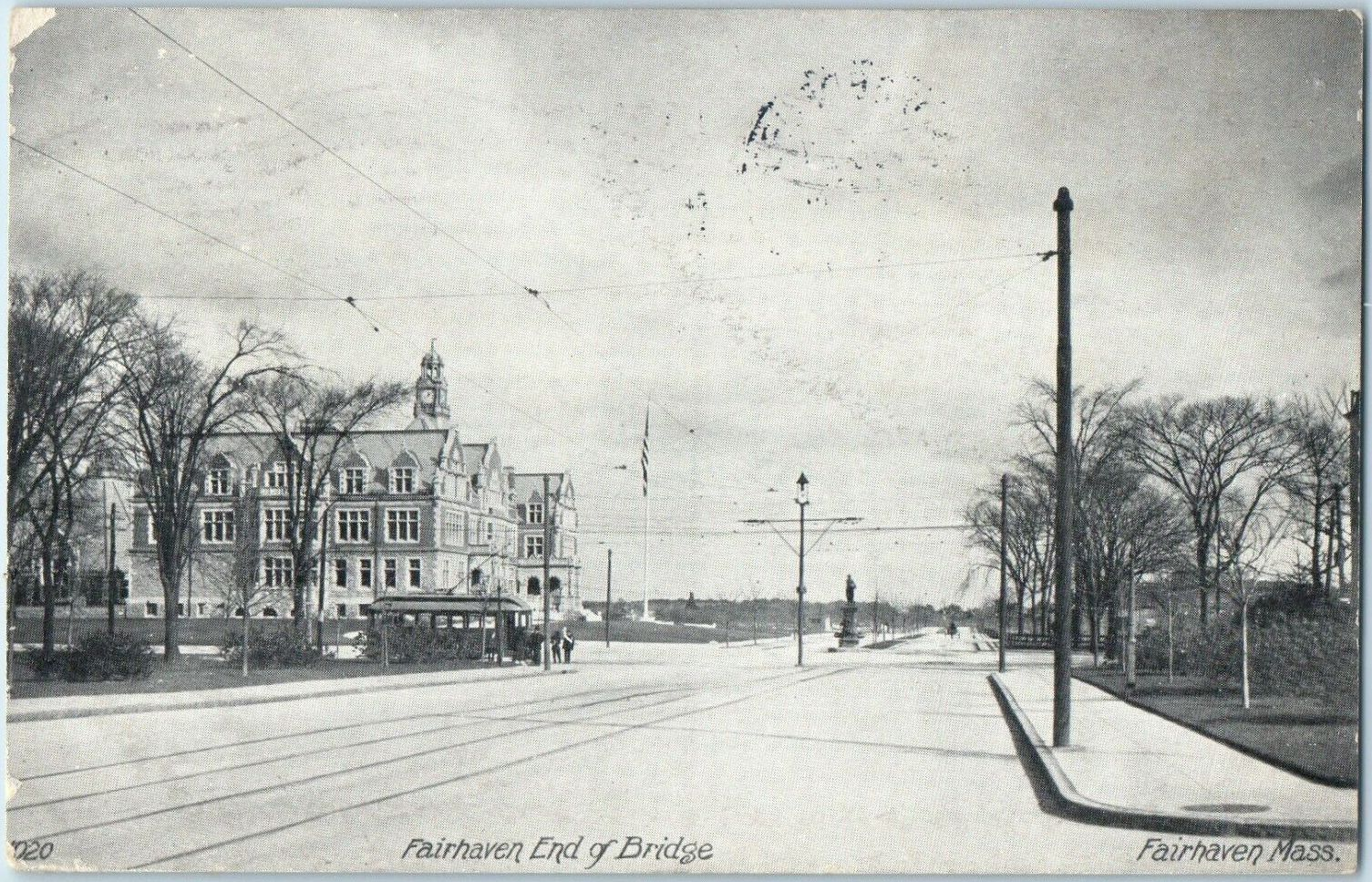
Postcard from 1910 showing Fairhaven High looking eastward

== Campus ==
The high school campus is located on the north side of Huttleston Avenue (United States Route 6), a short way east of the Acushnet River and New Bedford Harbor. Nicknamed "The Castle on the Hill," its main building is a monumental masonry structure in an H-shaped layout, with two full stories, full basement, and a third floor and attic under its pitched slate roofs. It is predominantly brick, with an ashlar granite foundation and limestone belt courses. Designed by architect Charles Brigham, it is reminiscent of Tudor architecture with Gothic influences, with a picturesque roofline studded with gables topped by iron finials, and rich carved stonework including gargoyles, grotesques, and depictions of historic figures. Room 107M on the first floor is a classroom still in use that contains its original 102 original desks as well as an ornately decorated ceiling.

A modern addition, designed by Flansburgh and Associates and built in 1996, is connected to the east end by a corridor. The addition contains administrative offices, a gymnasium, a cafeteria, and a performing arts center. Several additional classrooms were also included in the addition, including a new science wing on the second floor.

The school was named the "most beautiful" public high school in the state of Massachusetts by Architectural Digest in 2017.

== Academics ==
Since 2013, students from Fairhaven High's Media Arts program received 28 New England Student Production Awards (61 nominations) and 3 National Student Production Awards (9 nominations). The school houses a student-run television studio and produces a morning announcements program, "Blue Devil Television" (BDTV).

== Athletics ==
Fairhaven High School's athletic teams are called the Blue Devils, and they wear blue and white. They compete in the South Coast Conference, in District 8 of the Massachusetts Interscholastic Athletic Association (MIAA). The football, soccer, and field hockey teams play at Alumni Stadium, which sits adjacent to the east side of the newer addition. A new turf athletic field was installed on the site during the Summer 2021. Track and field events are hosted at nearby Cushman Park.

The Blue Devils' biggest in-conference rivals are the Old Rochester Regional Bulldogs and the New Bedford Voc-Tech Bears. Fairhaven High also has a historic football rivalry with Dartmouth High School, dating back over a century. The two schools play annually on Thanksgiving Day, hosting the game in alternating years.

The school sponsors the following varsity sports:

- Baseball (Boys)
- Basketball (Boys, Girls)
- Cross Country (Boys, Girls)
- Field Hockey (Girls)
- Football (Boys)
- Golf (Boys)
- Lacrosse (Boys, Girls)
- Soccer (Boys, Girls)
- Softball (Girls)
- Volleyball (Girls)

In addition to the varsity teams, Fairhaven High has junior varsity teams for most sports, as well as freshmen teams for baseball, boys and girls basketball, football, and volleyball. A unified basketball team was created in 2019, providing opportunities to students with disabilities; this program was joined by a unified track team a year later. In 2022, Fairhaven High School was recognized by Special Olympics International for "excellence in inclusion, advocacy, and respect."

== Notable alumni ==
- Carl Etelman, professional football player
- William Q. MacLean Jr., member of the Massachusetts General Court from 1961 to 1993
- Gil Santos (1956), sports announcer
- Milton Silveira, aerospace engineer

== See also ==
- National Register of Historic Places listings in Bristol County, Massachusetts
