= Oxford School (Fairhaven, Massachusetts) =

- U.S. National Register of Historic Places
- Location within Massachusetts Location within the United States
- Location: 347 Main Street, Fairhaven, Massachusetts
- Coordinates: 41°39′25″N 70°54′30″W
- Area: 1.06 acres (0.43 ha)
- Built: 1896
- Architect: William C. Collett
- Architectural style: Classical Revival
- NRHP reference No.: 100008623
- Added to NRHP: February 17, 2023

The Oxford School is a historic school building at 347 Main Street in Fairhaven, Massachusetts, United States. Built in 1896 and enlarged in 1921, it was the town's first large elementary school, built for an part of the community which grew rapidly due to its proximity to the mills of New Bedford. The building, a good example of period neo-Classical architecture, was listed on the National Register of Historic Places in 2023. It has been converted to residential use.

== Description and history ==
The former Oxford School building is located in northern Fairhaven, at the southeast corner of Main and Morton Streets. It is an L-shaped structure two stories in height, with neo-Classical features. Its original main block is finished in red brick, with a projecting 2 1/2-story entry pavilion at the center of its symmetrical facade. The main block is connected via a narrow connector at its rear to a wide two-story extension, added in 2021-22 when the building was converted to residential use.

The school's main block was built in two stages. The first part, built in 1896, was five bays deep and three wide; the second, added in 1914, was also five by 3, giving the building its present symmetrical appearance. It was the town's first large-scale elementary school, built to meet demand caused by residential growth. This growth was spurred by the construction of a bridge across the Acushnet River, opening the area to workers in the mills of New Bedford. The school was again enlarged in the early 1950s; this addition was demolished as part of the 2021-22 residential conversion.

The original building contains a bell made by American Revolution icon Paul Revere in 1796. The bell was purchased to be placed on top of Oxford School in 1915, and was temporarily removed between 2015 and 2021 during renovations to allow for restoration of the cupola.

== See also ==
- National Register of Historic Places listings in Bristol County, Massachusetts
