= Mary Ann Tripp =

Mary Ann (Hathaway) Tripp
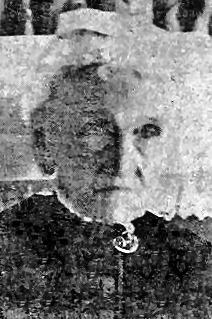
- Born: Mary Ann Hathaway; October 22, 1810; New York
- Died: October 24, 1906 (aged 96); Fairhaven, Massachusetts
- Other names: Mary Ann Hathaway, Mary Ann Tripp
- Notable work: First American woman to circumnavigate the globe and the first American woman to visit China

Mary Ann Tripp (née Hathaway; 1810–1906) was the first American woman to visit China and also the first American woman to circumnavigate the Earth. She also visited the Philippine Islands during this historic trip. She then went on to travel the globe and visit China two more times before settling into a long life in Massachusetts.

== Formative years ==
Born on October 22, 1810, Mary Ann Hathaway was a native of the State of New York in the United States.

In 1828, she visited the Massachusetts community of Fairhaven in Bristol County. While there, she met her future husband, Captain Lemuel C. Tripp, a man who commanded merchant vessels which typically sailed from the port of New York City, New York and carried cargo to major ports across the globe.

== Historic travels ==
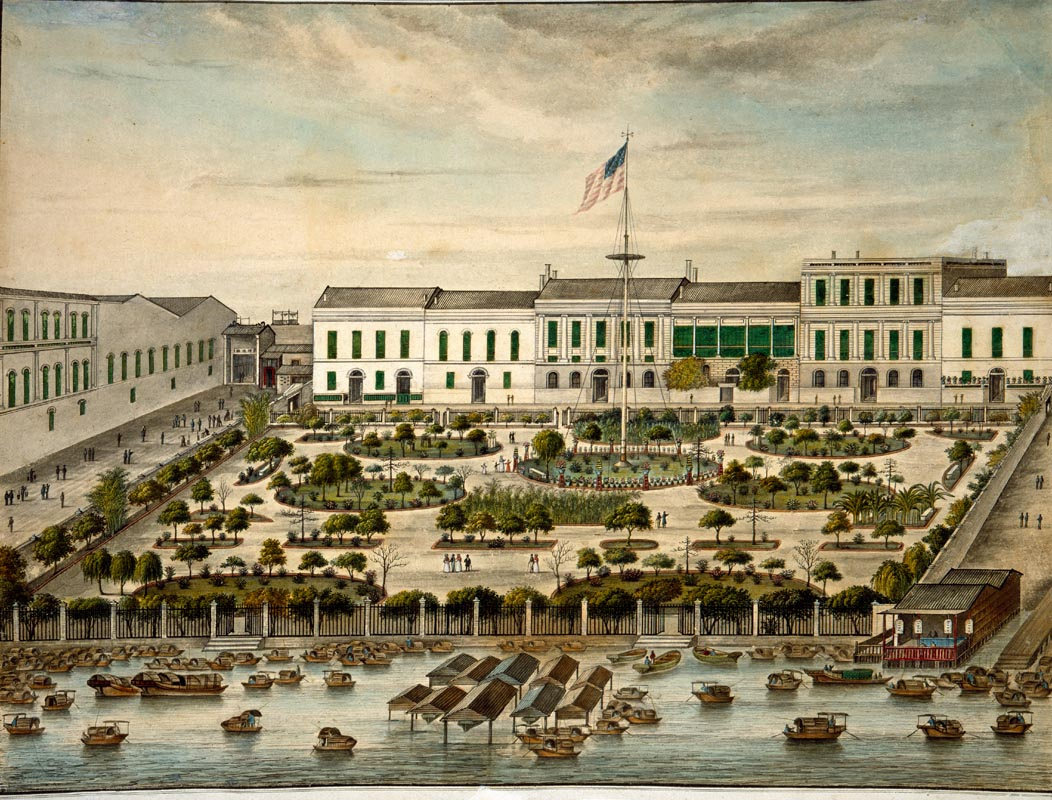
"The American Garden," Guangzhou (Canton), China, c. 1845 (public domain).

In 1830, Mary Ann (Hathaway) Tripp became the first American woman to visit China and also the first American woman to circumnavigate the Earth while sailing with her husband in his capacity as captain of a merchant vessel bound for Guangzhou (Canton). She also visited The Philippine Islands during this historic trip. According to her hometown newspaper, The Fairhaven Star:

She always looked back on that first voyage as an important event in her life, and she recalled with much amusement the efforts of Captain Tripp and herself to visit the walled city of Canton. They were at a port not many miles from Canton and were transported to the gates by means of a car carried by two Chinamen. Arriving, they entered the gate but further progress was barred by a guard and they were obliged to retire. Admission was sought at the other gates, but they met with similar reaction in each instance. They finally gave up the attempt but they were afterwards able to say that they had been within the walls of the city.

During her second trip around the globe, she and her husband sustained a mild shock when the vessel he was commanding, the Oneida, was struck by a whaling vessel at night while both ships were making their way across the Pacific Ocean. Although the whaling vessel lost its mizzen mast and one of its smaller whaleboats, the Oneida sustained no serious damage, and was able to continue on its way. When interviewed later in life, Mary Ann (Hathaway) Tripp recalled that she had never felt afraid during any of her travels but was, instead, more often left with feelings of curiosity or fascination.

After returning to America, she settled into life in Fairhaven, Massachusetts, where her husband had built a mansion on Adams Street. Religiously, she was a member of the Congregational Church in her community.

== Later life ==
On April 24, 1864, Mary Ann (Hathaway) Tripp became a widow when her husband died in Fairhaven at the age of 62. He was laid to rest at Fairhaven's Riverside Cemetery.

No longer in need of a large home, but in need of funding to support herself as she aged, Mrs. Tripp subsequently sold the estate where she had resided with her late husband. (The house and grounds were later purchased by Professor Theodore Thomas, and then resold to the Congregation of the Sacred Hearts, which converted the estate into a monastery.)

She then moved into a home on the corner of Washington and William Streets in Fairhaven.

== Injury, death and burial ==
In 1899, Mary Ann (Hathaway) Tripp suffered a severe fall during which she fractured her hip. The fall ultimately proved to be a devastating experience for the 89-year-old because the injury to her bone never healed well. As a result, she was “unable to move about except in an invalid’s chair,” according to reports by The Fairhaven Star. Despite this, she remained sharp mentally well into her 90s, and only needed to use glasses for reading. Per her hometown newspaper, “Her hearing and memory [were] excellent and she never [tired] of receiving visitors who [found] her a most entertaining conversationalist.”

After a long, history-making life, Mary Ann (Hathaway) Tripp died at her home on 22 William Street in Fairhaven, Bristol County, Massachusetts on Wednesday, October 24, 1906. She was then laid to rest at Fairhaven's Riverside Cemetery. Aged 96, she was “the oldest woman in Fairhaven, according to her obituary in The Fairhaven Star.

== External resources ==
- Perdue, Peter C. “Rise & Fall of the Canton Trade System – III: Canton & Hong Kong," in “MIT Visualizing Cultures.” Cambridge, Massachusetts: Massachusetts Institute of Technology, 2003.
- Tripp Family, in “Hair Wreath.” Fairhaven, Massachusetts: The Millicent Library, accessed May 3, 2018.
- “Tripp House?”. Fairhaven, Massachusetts: The Millicent Library, accessed May 3, 2018.
