= Northeast Maritime Institute =

Coordinates: 41.6376°N 70.9035°W

- Motto: Honor the Mariner
- Type: Private
- President: Eric R. Dawicki
- Chief academic officer: Angela M. Dawicki
- Location: Fairhaven, Massachusetts, United States
- Colors: Navy blue, gold, green
- Website: nmi.edu

Northeast Maritime Institute (also called NMI) is a private, coeducational, maritime college offering an Associate in Applied Science in Nautical Science degree. Established in 1981, Northeast Maritime Institute is the only private degree-conferring maritime college in the US. The college is in the Town of Fairhaven, Massachusetts located in the United States and is within walking distance from the Acushnet River across from New Bedford Harbor. The college was originally established to provide an alternative to traditional maritime academy regimented-styled training and graduates of the college's Associate program are eligible to receive a United States Coast Guard Masters license upon graduation. The college operates a training ship, the m/v Navigator, as well as the brigantine tall ship m/s Fritha.

== History ==
Northeast Maritime Institute was founded in 1981 as the Tidewater School of Navigation, Inc. in New Bedford, Massachusetts. The school originally provided only continuing education courses and programs approved by the United States Coast Guard prior to becoming a college. In 1997 the school was renamed Northeast Maritime Institute and later moved its location to Fairhaven, Massachusetts where its main campus building is located today. Since its relocation the school has grown to four campus buildings all within walking distance and located within the center of Fairhaven.

In 2008, the Institute launched The Fairhaven Project through a public-private partnership with the U.S. Department of State to advance the cause of peace between Israel and Palestine. The program brought groups of Israeli and Palestinian students to Fairhaven where they would work together on board the brigantine tall ship m/s Fritha. A 30-minute documentary of the 2008 program was created and utilized by U.S. Embassies and Consulates in the Middle East and other regions of conflict to stimulate student discussions and extend a message of equality and understanding to a larger audience.

Northeast Maritime Institute delivers a range of on-line maritime education and training programs through its Learning Management System “NEMO°” (also called Northeast Maritime Online). The online education and training system was designed so that seafarers could complete training at sea rather than during their shore leave.

In 2018, Northeast Maritime Institute entered into a partnership program with the University of Virgin Islands for development of a degree program in maritime management.

== Academic programs ==
=== Nautical science ===
The institute's College of Nautical Science is a merchant marine college intended to prepare students to work on board ships as deck officers and captains upon graduation. In addition to completing all shore-side college classes, students are required to complete two “Semesters at Sea” whereby they work onboard U.S. flagged commercial vessels. Students may elect to complete their Semesters at Sea onboard any vessel that meets program requirements.
