= Fort Phoenix State Reservation =

Recreation area in Massachusetts, USA

- Aerial view of the reservation; Fort Phoenix's remnant ramparts may be seen in the foreground at the bottom of the image

- Location within Massachusetts Location within the United States
- Location: Fairhaven, Bristol, Massachusetts, United States
- Coordinates: 41°37′27″N 70°53′56″W
- Area: 28 acres (11 ha)
- Elevation: 7 ft (2.1 m)
- Established: Early 1960s
- Governing body: Massachusetts Department of Conservation and Recreation
- Website: Fort Phoenix State Reservation

Fort Phoenix State Reservation is a public recreation area on Buzzards Bay in the town of Fairhaven, Massachusetts. The reservation encompasses 28 acres (11 ha) adjacent to the remains of Fort Phoenix, an American Revolutionary War fort and national landmark from which the reservation takes its name. Off shore, the first naval battle of the Revolutionary War was fought near the Elizabeth Islands, which may be visible from the remnants of the fort's ramparts. The state park is maintained by the Massachusetts Department of Conservation and Recreation, while Fort Phoenix is separately managed and maintained by the town of Fairhaven.

== Park history ==
Military use of the fort ended in 1876. The reservation's beach saw the first flush of popularity in the 1880s when visitors were brought here by trolley from New Bedford.

The property was put up for sale by the United States Government, and was bought in 1925 for $5,000 by Cara Broughton, daughter of Fairhaven native and Standard Oil Company industrialist Henry Huttleston Rogers, who then presented Fort Phoenix to the Town of Fairhaven as a public park. Fort Phoenix was placed on the National Register of Historic Places in 1973.

== Activities and amenities ==
The park's half-mile beachfront offers swimming, hiking, picnicking and wheelchair-accessible restrooms, as well as tennis and basketball courts, outdoor showers, grills, and playground.
