= New Bedford – Fairhaven Bridge =

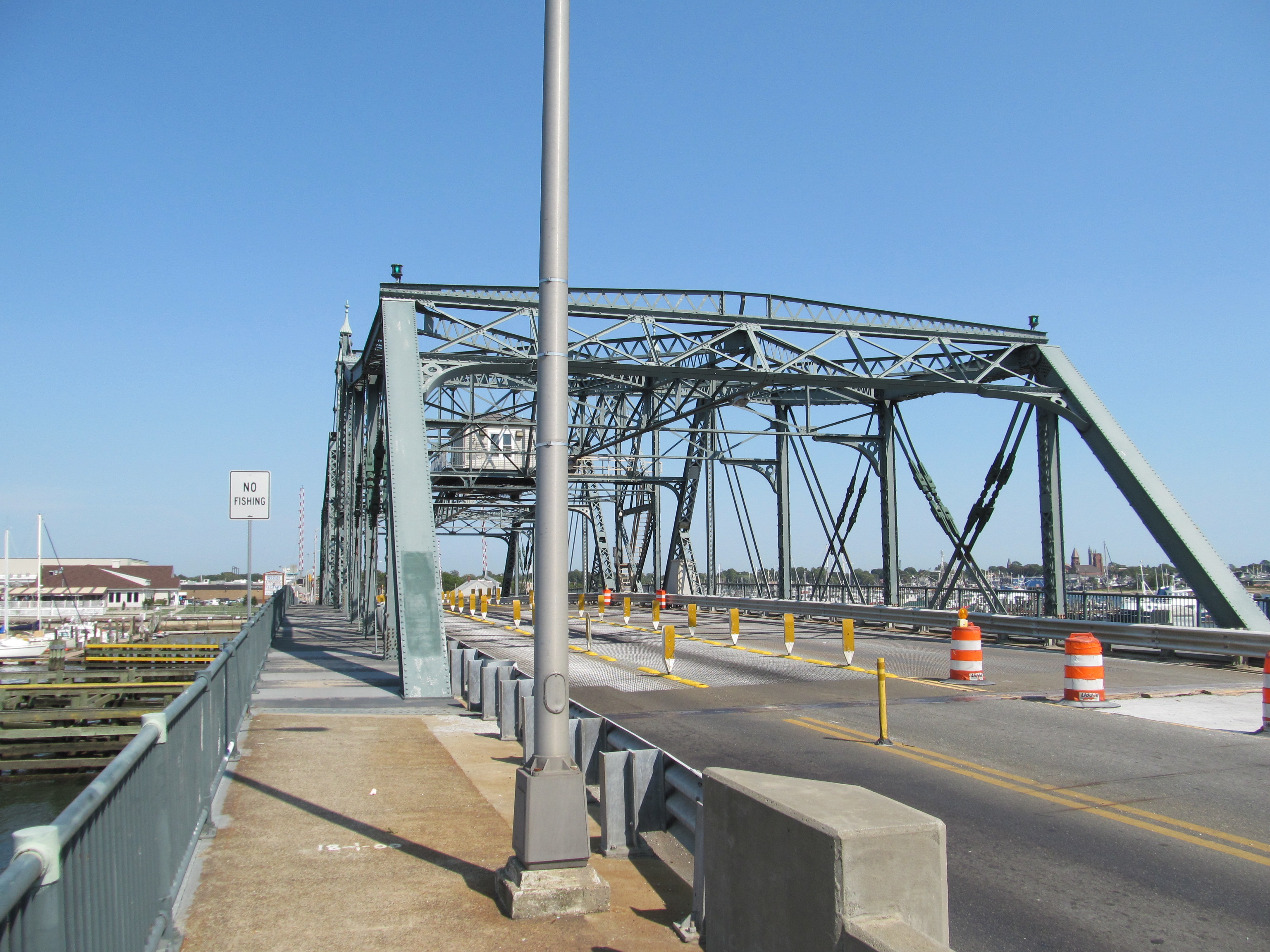
- New Bedford - Fairhaven Bridge
- Coordinates: 41.639158°N 70.917856°W
- Carries: US 6
- Crosses: Acushnet River
- Locale: New Bedford to Fairhaven, Massachusetts
- Owner: MassDOT
- NBI: F0100023PFDOTNBI

Characteristics
- Design: swing bridge
- Material: Steel
- Total length: 283.2 feet (86.3 m)
- Width: 70.5 feet (21.5 m) (total width)
- Longest span: 142.1 feet (43.3 m)
- Load limit: 61.7 short tons (55.1 long tons; 56.0 t)
- Clearance above: 20.0 feet (6.1 m)
- Clearance below: 5.9 feet (1.8 m)

History
- Construction start: 1897
- Construction end: 1899
- Opened: 1900
- Rebuilt: 1997

Statistics
- Daily traffic: 30,200 (2013)

Location
- Interactive map of New Bedford – Fairhaven Bridge

The New Bedford-Fairhaven Bridge is a swing truss bridge which connects New Bedford, Massachusetts with Fairhaven, Massachusetts.

== Between New Bedford and Fairhaven ==
The bridge is actually one of three bridges crossing the Acushnet River between the two communities. The entire four lane stretch carries U.S. Route 6 between the two communities. A short, 500-foot-long (150 m) span crosses between the mainland of New Bedford just west of McArthur Drive to Fish Island, the smaller western island in the river. From there, after a 0.1-mile (0.16 km) stretch of highway connects the two spans, the main New Bedford-Fairhaven Bridge crosses from Fish Island to Pope's Island. This span includes the main span (see below). Once on Pope's Island, another 0.4-mile (0.64 km) stretch of highway connects to the third and longest span, a low, 0.2-mile (0.32 km) trestle bridge between Pope's Island and the town of Fairhaven, with the town line falling on the bridge. The entire stretch is just over 1 mile (1.6 km) between the two shores.

== The main span ==
While many maps include all three spans as one "New Bedford-Fairhaven Bridge", only the middle span between the two is the actual bridge. This span, which was built between 1897 and 1899, is the one which includes the 283.2-foot-long (86.3 m) swing truss across the main channel into the northern half of the harbor. The entire bridge, approaches included, is approximately 0.2 miles (0.32 km) long, with the swing span being mostly west of the center of the bridge. The bridge still opens on a regular basis, with daily openings to allow the fishing fleet in and out of the inner harbor.

The main span was an early example of the application of electric power to bridge operation. It is one of the few swing-type bridges remaining in operation in Massachusetts.

The bridge has been repaired numerous times in its lifetime, though there are occasional closings due to jammed gears.

== Major rehabilitation ==
In 2022, a $100 million planning study was funded by the Massachusetts Department of Transportation (MassDOT) to determine how the antiquated bridge might be replaced, and public meetings have been held to gain input on the needs of the region in replacing the structure.

As of 2024, MassDOT has announced it plans to replace the bridge with a vertical lift bridge. Construction is expected to begin in 2027. City officials from New Bedford have raised concerns about the new bridge's imposed height limit, aesthetics, and the speed of bridge openings.

New Bedford - Fairhaven bridge postcard of the bridge predating the 1899 bridge.

== See also ==
- List of bridges documented by the Historic American Engineering Record in Massachusetts
