= West Wareham, Massachusetts =

- Census-designated place
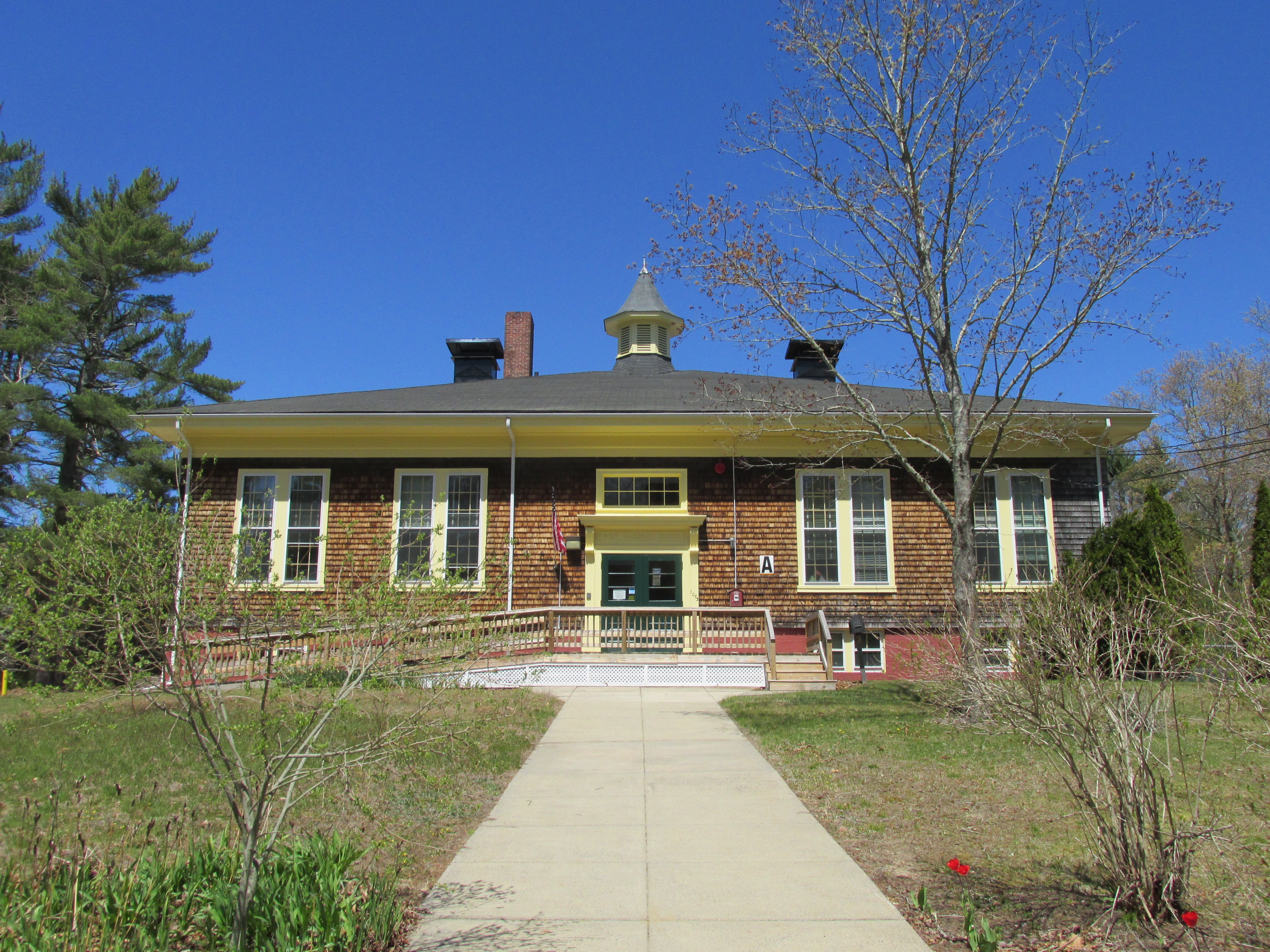
- West Wareham School

- Location in Plymouth County in Massachusetts
- Coordinates: 41°47′28″N 70°45′2″W
- Country: United States
- State: Massachusetts
- County: Plymouth

Area
  - Total: 3.80 sq mi (9.83 km^{2})
  - Land: 3.73 sq mi (9.66 km^{2})
  - Water: 0.066 sq mi (0.17 km^{2})
- Elevation: 59 ft (18 m)

Population (2020)
  - Total: 2,224
  - Density: 596.1/sq mi (230.15/km^{2})
- Time zone: UTC-5 (Eastern (EST))
  - Summer (DST): UTC-4 (EDT)
- ZIP Codes: 02576 (West Wareham); 02571 (Wareham)
- Area code: 508
- FIPS code: 25-78410
- GNIS feature ID: 0614499

West Wareham is a census-designated place (CDP) in the town of Wareham in Plymouth County, Massachusetts, United States. As of the 2020 census, West Wareham had a population of 2,224.

== Geography ==
West Wareham is located at 41°47′28″N 70°45′2″W (41.791007, -70.750548).

According to the United States Census Bureau, the CDP has a total area of 9.8 km^{2} (3.8 mi^{2}), of which 9.6 km^{2} (3.7 mi^{2}) is land and 0.2 km^{2} (0.1 mi^{2}) (1.85%) is water.

== Demographics ==
Historical population
Census	Pop.	Note	%±
2020	2,224		—
U.S. Decennial Census

=== 2020 census ===
As of the 2020 census, West Wareham had a population of 2,224. The median age was 54.8 years. 14.7% of residents were under the age of 18 and 30.7% of residents were 65 years of age or older. For every 100 females there were 89.8 males, and for every 100 females age 18 and over there were 89.8 males age 18 and over.

92.9% of residents lived in urban areas, while 7.1% lived in rural areas.

There were 1,073 households in West Wareham, of which 20.4% had children under the age of 18 living in them. Of all households, 38.5% were married-couple households, 22.7% were households with a male householder and no spouse or partner present, and 30.3% were households with a female householder and no spouse or partner present. About 35.5% of all households were made up of individuals and 21.9% had someone living alone who was 65 years of age or older.

There were 1,145 housing units, of which 6.3% were vacant. The homeowner vacancy rate was 1.4% and the rental vacancy rate was 4.4%.

Racial composition as of the 2020 census
Race	Number	Percent
White	1,769	79.5%
Black or African American	67	3.0%
American Indian and Alaska Native	10	0.4%
Asian	7	0.3%
Native Hawaiian and Other Pacific Islander	0	0.0%
Some other race	97	4.4%
Two or more races	274	12.3%
Hispanic or Latino (of any race)	70	3.1%

=== 2000 census ===
As of the census of 2000, there were 1,908 people, 830 households, and 523 families residing in the CDP. The population density was 198.0/km^{2} (512.7/mi^{2}). There were 874 housing units at an average density of 90.7/km^{2} (234.8/mi^{2}). The racial makeup of the CDP was 85.06% White, 2.20% African American, 0.79% Native American, 0.37% Asian, 6.92% from other races, and 4.66% from two or more races. Hispanic or Latino of any race were 1.36% of the population.

There were 830 households, out of which 24.8% had children under the age of 18 living with them, 46.3% were married couples living together, 12.5% had a female householder with no husband present, and 36.9% were non-families. 32.4% of all households were made up of individuals, and 21.2% had someone living alone who was 65 years of age or older. The average household size was 2.30 and the average family size was 2.89.

In the CDP, the population was spread out, with 21.2% under the age of 18, 5.6% from 18 to 24, 25.8% from 25 to 44, 24.1% from 45 to 64, and 23.4% who were 65 years of age or older. The median age was 43 years. For every 100 females, there were 84.2 males. For every 100 females age 18 and over, there were 78.3 males.

The median income for a household in the CDP was $33,167, and the median income for a family was $43,333. Males had a median income of $40,462 versus $28,333 for females. The per capita income for the CDP was $20,974. About 6.4% of families and 7.1% of the population were below the poverty line, including 3.4% of those under age 18 and 16.9% of those age 65 or over.
