= Fairhaven, Massachusetts =

Fairhaven, Massachusetts Sconticut
- Town
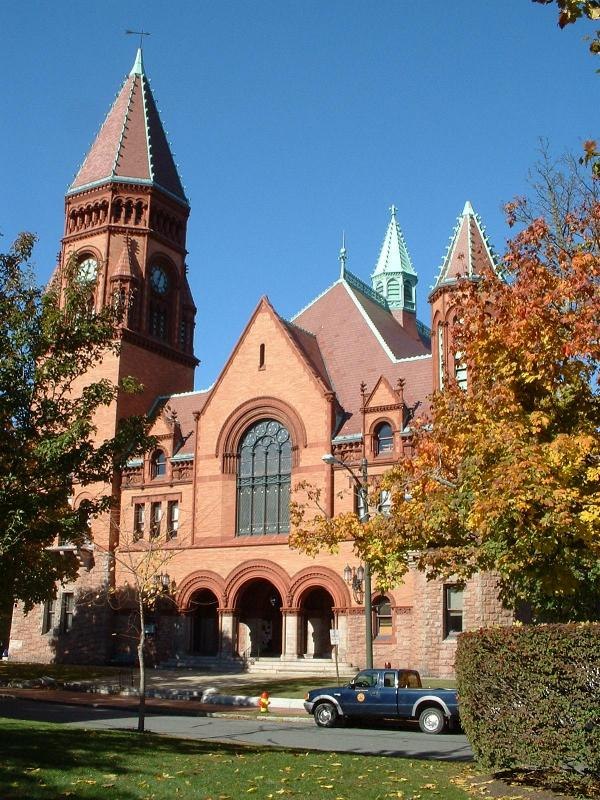
- Fairhaven Town Hall

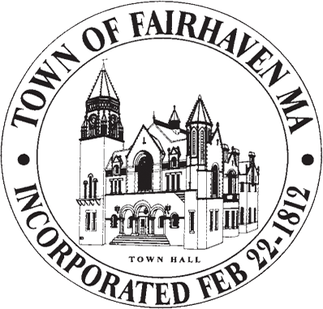
- Seal

- Location in Bristol County in Massachusetts
- Coordinates: 41°38′15″N 70°54′15″W
- Country: United States
- State: Massachusetts
- County: Bristol
- Settled: 1659
- Incorporated: 1812

Government
  - Type: Representative town meeting

Area
  - Total: 14.1 sq mi (36.5 km^{2})
  - Land: 12.4 sq mi (32.1 km^{2})
  - Water: 1.7 sq mi (4.4 km^{2})
- Elevation: 16 ft (5 m)

Population (2020)
  - Total: 15,924
  - Density: 1,280/sq mi (496/km^{2})
- Time zone: UTC-5 (Eastern)
  - Summer (DST): UTC-4 (Eastern)
- ZIP code: 02719
- Area code: 508 / 774
- FIPS code: 25-22130
- GNIS feature ID: 0618281
- Website: www.fairhaven-ma.gov

Fairhaven (Massachusett: Sconticut) is a town in Bristol County, Massachusetts, United States. It is located on the South Coast of Massachusetts where the Acushnet River flows into Buzzards Bay, an arm of the Atlantic Ocean. The town shares a harbor with the city of New Bedford, a place well known for its whaling and fishing heritage; consequently, Fairhaven's history, economy, and culture are closely aligned with those of its larger neighbor. The population of Fairhaven was 15,924 at the time of the 2020 census.

== History ==
=== Original land purchase ===
Fairhaven was first settled in 1659 as "Cushnea," the easternmost part of the town of Dartmouth. It was founded on land purchased by English settlers at the Plymouth Colony from the Wampanoag sachem Massasoit, and his son, Wamsutta.

=== Dartmouth, divided and redivided ===
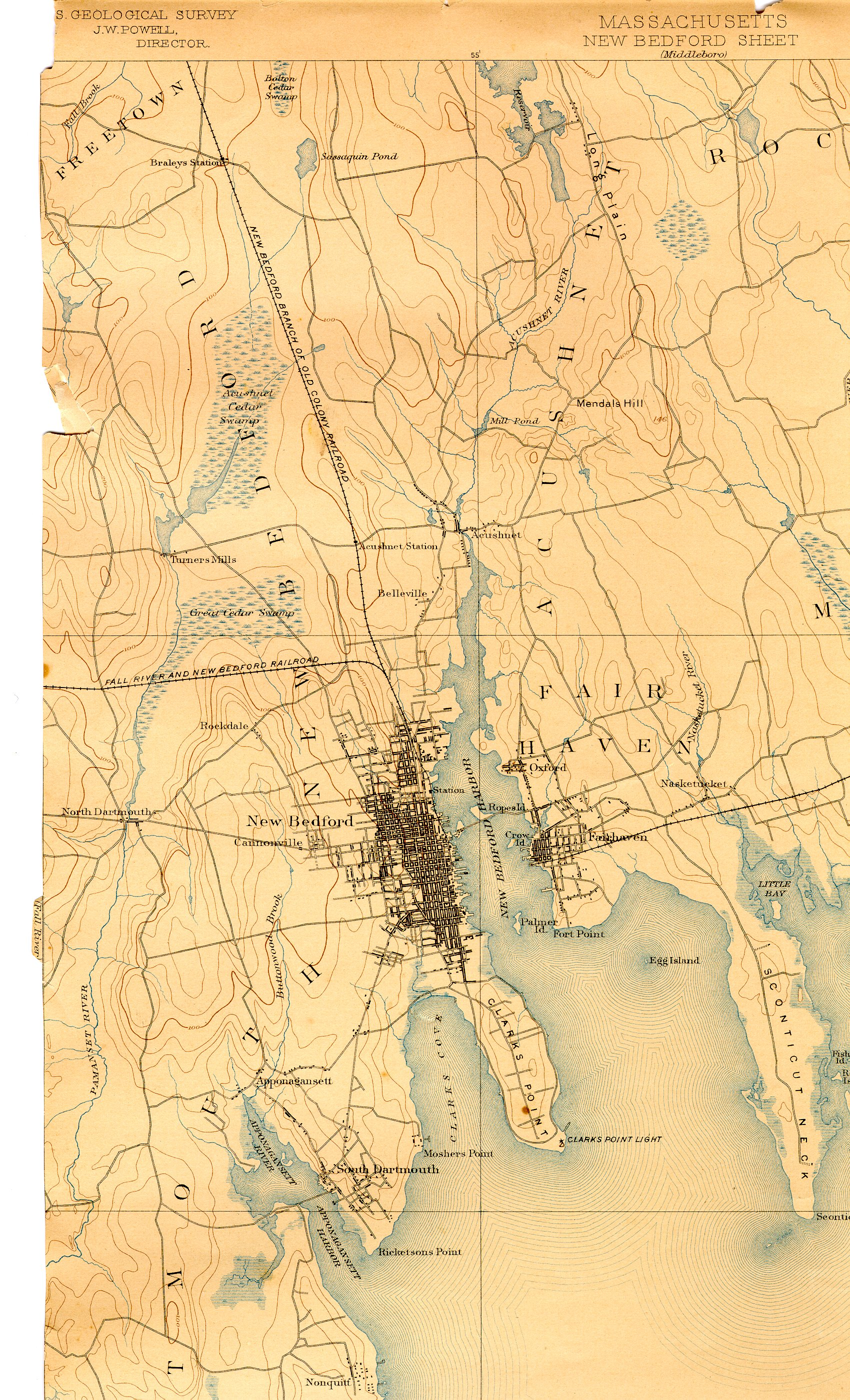
Fairhaven on an 1893 map

In 1787, the eastern portion of Dartmouth seceded and formed a new settlement called New Bedford. This new town included areas that are the present-day towns of Fairhaven, Acushnet, and New Bedford itself. Fairhaven eventually separated from New Bedford, and it was officially incorporated in 1812. At that time, Fairhaven included all of the land on the east bank of the Acushnet River. The northern portion of Fairhaven, upriver from Buzzards Bay, formed another independent town, called Acushnet, in 1860. Thus, what had once been a single town, Dartmouth, with a substantial land area, became, in less than 75 years, four separate municipalities. (The western portion of the original Dartmouth land-purchase eventually became a fifth town, Westport.)

=== Fort Phoenix ===
Fort Phoenix, owned by the Town of Fairhaven, is located in Fairhaven at the mouth of the Acushnet River, and it served, during colonial and revolutionary times, as the primary defense against seaborne attacks on New Bedford harbor. It is adjacent to the Fort Phoenix State Beach and Reservation operated by the state.

Within sight of the fort, the first naval battle of the American Revolution took place on May 14, 1775. Under the command of Nathaniel Pope and Daniel Egery, a group of 25 Fairhaven minutemen (including Noah Stoddard) aboard the sloop Success retrieved two vessels previously captured by a British warship in Buzzards Bay.

On September 5 and 6, 1778, the British landed four thousand soldiers on the west side of the Acushnet River. They burned ships and warehouses in New Bedford, skirmished at the Head-of-the-River bridge (approximately where the Main Street bridge in Acushnet is presently situated), and marched through Fairhaven to Sconticut Neck, burning homes along the way. In deference to the overwhelming force approaching from the landward side, the fort was abandoned, and it was destroyed by the enemy. An attack on Fairhaven village itself was repelled by militia under the command of Major Israel Fearing, who had marched from Wareham, some 15 miles (24 km) away, with additional militiamen. Fearing's heroic action saved Fairhaven from further molestation.

The fort was enlarged before the War of 1812, and it helped repel an attack on the harbor by British forces. In the early morning hours of June 13, 1814, landing boats were launched from the British raider, HMS Nimrod. Alerted by the firing of the guns at Fort Phoenix, the militia gathered, and the British did not come ashore.

The fort was decommissioned in 1876, and in 1926 the site was donated to the town by Cara Rogers Broughton (a daughter of Henry Huttleston Rogers). Today, the area surrounding the fort includes a park and a bathing beach. The fort lies just to the seaward side of the harbor's hurricane barrier.

=== Whaling ===
Prior to the second half of the nineteenth century, whale oil was the primary source of fuel for lighting in the United States. The whaling industry was an economic mainstay for many New England coastal communities for over two hundred years. The famous whaling port of New Bedford is located across the Acushnet River from Fairhaven. Fairhaven was also a whaling port; in fact, in the year 1838, Fairhaven was the second-largest whaling port in the United States, with 24 vessels sailing for the whaling grounds. The author of Moby-Dick, Herman Melville, departed from the port of Fairhaven aboard the whaleship Acushnet in 1841.

However, once New Bedford's predominance in the whaling industry became apparent, Fairhaven's economy evolved into one that supplemented the New Bedford economy rather than competing directly with it. Fairhaven became a town of shipwrights, ship chandlers, ropemakers, coopers, and sailmakers. It also became a popular location for ship-owners and ship-captains to build their homes and raise their children.

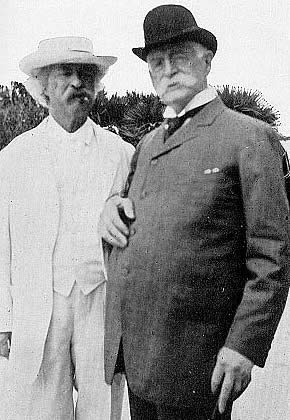
Twain and Rogers

=== Henry Huttleston Rogers ===
Among Fairhaven's natives was Henry Huttleston Rogers (1840–1909), a businessman and philanthropist. Rogers was one of the key men in John D. Rockefeller's Standard Oil trust. He later developed the Virginian Railway. Rogers and his wife, Abbie Gifford Rogers, another Fairhaven native (who was the daughter of the whaling captain Peleg Gifford), donated many community improvements in the late-nineteenth- and early-twentieth-century, including a grammar school, an extraordinarily luxurious high school, the Town Hall, the George H. Taber Masonic Building, the Unitarian Memorial Church, the Tabitha Inn, the Millicent Library, and a modern water-and-sewer system. These structures were erected to top-quality construction standards, a trademark philosophy of Henry H. Rogers; some are still in regular use more than one hundred years later.

In 1885, Rogers built a huge and modern (for the times) elementary school and, in 1893, a memorial to his beloved daughter, Millicent, in the form of an Italian-Renaissance palazzo that serves as the town's free public library to this day. On February 22, 1894, when the Fairhaven Town Hall, a gift of Abbie Palmer (Gifford) Rogers, was dedicated, Mark Twain delivered a humorous speech to mark the occasion. Less than three months later, on May 21, 1894, Abbie Rogers died in New York following surgery for stomach cancer.

His grandson was The 1st Baron Fairhaven (1896–1966).

Rogers befriended a number of the high and mighty; he also became a friend, advisor, and patron to a number of the less-well-off. Among his friends were Booker T. Washington, Anne Sullivan, Helen Keller, and Mark Twain, all of whom came to visit Rogers in Fairhaven, sometimes for protracted periods. Late in Twain's life, he had managed to impoverish himself; Rogers lent him a helping hand, and Twain did whatever he could to return the favors.

== Geography ==
According to the United States Census Bureau, the town has a total area of 14.1 square miles (37 km^{2}), of which 12.4 square miles (32 km^{2}) is land and 1.7 square miles (4.4 km^{2}), or 12.06%, is water. It is bordered by the river and New Bedford to the west, Acushnet to the north, Mattapoisett to the east and Buzzards Bay to the south. The town line with Mattapoisett lies along the Bristol and Plymouth county lines. The town is the southeastern corner of Bristol County, and contains the easternmost point of the county, on West Island. Fairhaven is approximately 54 miles (87 km) south of Boston, 21 miles (34 km) by land west of Cape Cod, and 32 miles (51 km) southeast of Providence, Rhode Island.

The town is located on Buzzards Bay, on the eastern bank of the Acushnet River at its mouth. The lands of the town jut out into the bay via Sconticut Neck and West Island, along with several other small islands. Most of the town's water area consists of its harbors, bays and coves, along with a portion of the Acushnet's waters, and Nasketucket and Scipping Creeks. The town lies along coastal plain, and has some swampland along the Nasketucket and around Boy's and Girl's Creeks, north of Priest's Cove. Fairhaven's localities include Fairhaven Center, North Fairhaven, East Fairhaven, Oxford, Poverty Point, Nasketucket, Sconticut Neck, and Winsegansett Heights. Most of the town's population lies either in the west side of town, along Sconticut Neck or in the village of East Fairhaven, with the northeast quarter of the town's land sparsely populated.

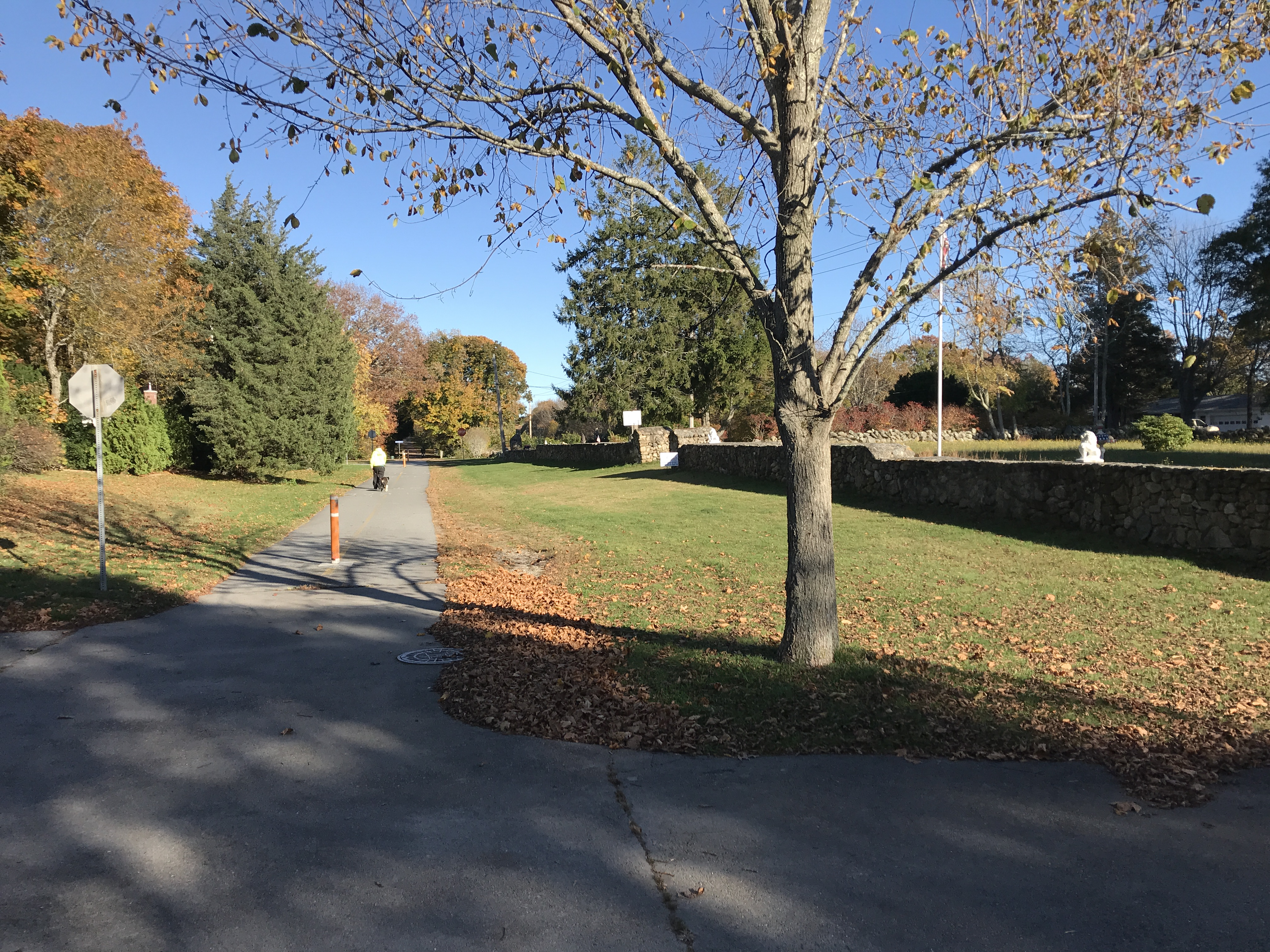
Phoenix Rail Trail heading east from Hamlet Street

The town has two large public parks, Livesey Park and Cushman Park, as well as a number of smaller ones. Cushman Park, as well as having tennis courts and ballfields and a bandstand, is the location of Fairhaven High School's running track. The town has several commercial wharves, a yacht club, and several marinas for recreational craft. There are several small bathing beaches, the largest being the Fort Phoenix State Reservation, a south-facing beach to the east of the fort and the New Bedford Harbor Hurricane Barrier. There is also a bike path, the Phoenix Rail Trail, which travels along a long-unused railroad right-of-way (formerly the Fairhaven Branch Railroad), just to the south of Route 6. The 5.2-mile long rail trail connects Fairhaven Center with Mattapoisett Center.

== Transportation ==
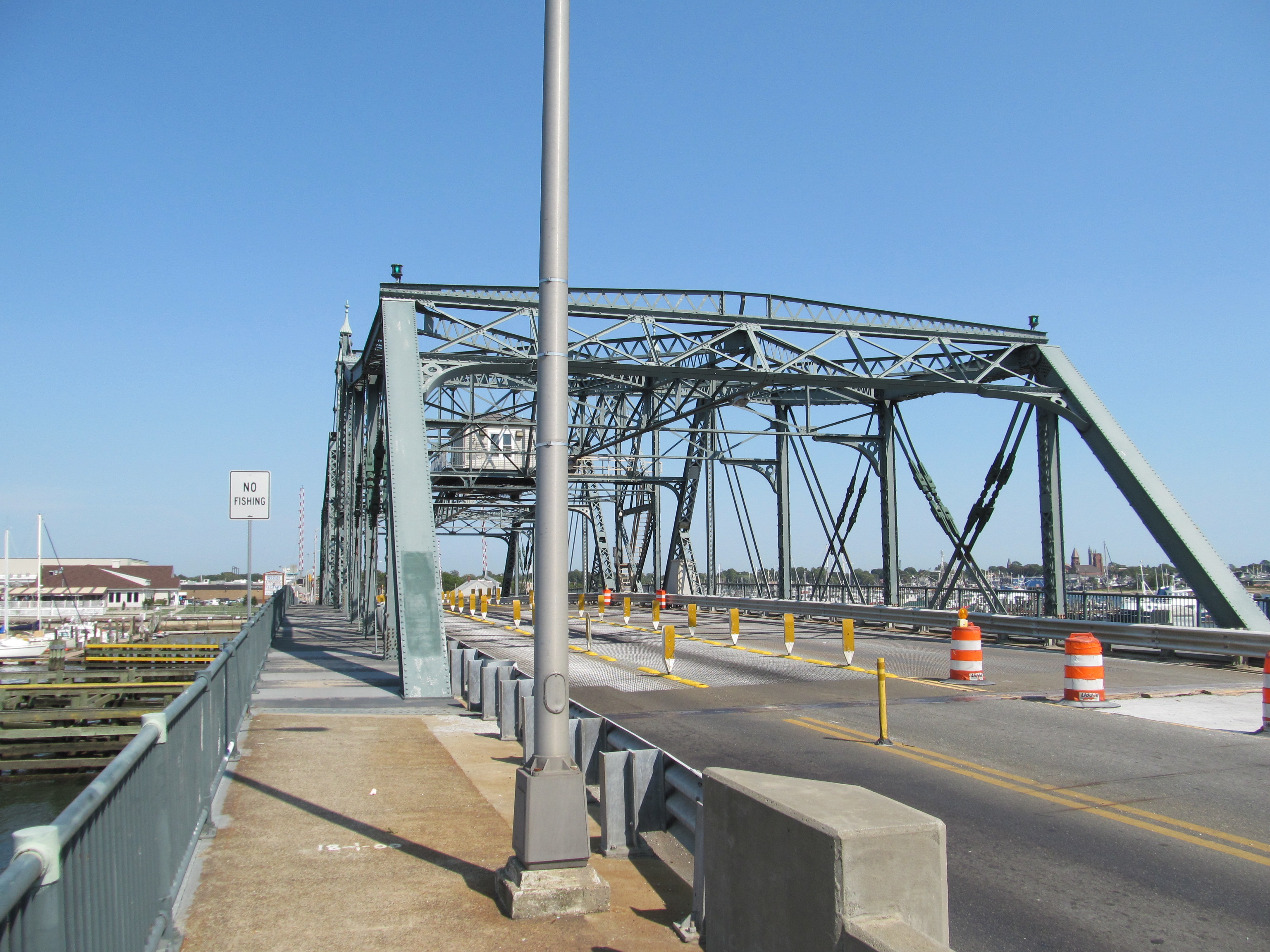
Facing east on the New Bedford-Fairhaven Bridge

Interstate 195 travels on an east–west path through town, crossing the Acushnet River at the point where it begins to broaden as it approaches New Bedford Harbor. Fairhaven is also crossed by U.S. Route 6, which enters the town on a bridge between the mainland and Pope's Island, which is connected to the rest of New Bedford by the New Bedford-Fairhaven Bridge, a swing-span truss bridge over one hundred years old. Massachusetts Route 240, a short, 1 mile (1.6 km) divided highway, connects Interstate 195 at Exit 29 to the intersection of Route 6 and Sconticut Neck Road. The town's retail center is located at this intersection, and includes several stores, markets, and restaurants, and is the main retail center for neighboring Acushnet and Mattapoisett as well.

SRTA provides bus service between Fairhaven and New Bedford, as well as two short shuttle routes between the town and Acushnet and Mattapoisett. The town has no rail or air service. The MBTA is in the process of extending commuter rail service to neighboring New Bedford. New Bedford also is the location of the nearest airport to Fairhaven, the New Bedford Regional Airport. The nearest national air service is at T.F. Green Airport in Warwick, Rhode Island.

== Demographics ==
Historical population
| Year | Pop. | ±% |
|---|---|---|
| 1850 | 4,304 | — |
| 1860 | 3,118 | −27.6% |
| 1870 | 2,626 | −15.8% |
| 1880 | 2,875 | +9.5% |
| 1890 | 2,919 | +1.5% |
| 1900 | 3,567 | +22.2% |
| 1910 | 5,122 | +43.6% |
| 1920 | 7,291 | +42.3% |
| 1930 | 10,951 | +50.2% |
| 1940 | 10,938 | −0.1% |
| 1950 | 12,764 | +16.7% |
| 1960 | 14,339 | +12.3% |
| 1970 | 16,332 | +13.9% |
| 1980 | 15,759 | −3.5% |
| 1990 | 16,132 | +2.4% |
| 2000 | 16,159 | +0.2% |
| 2010 | 15,873 | −1.8% |
| 2020 | 15,924 | +0.3% |
| 2024* | 16,005 | +0.5% |
* = population estimate. Source: United States census records and Population Estimates Program data.

As of the census of 2020, there were 15,924 people, 8,423 households, and 4,354 families residing in the town. The population density was 1,303.4 inhabitants per square mile (503.2/km^{2}). There were 7,266 housing units at an average density of 586.1 per square mile (226.3/km^{2}). The racial makeup of the town was 96.32% White, 0.60% African American, 0.26% Native American, 0.44% Asian, 0.02% Pacific Islander, 1.19% from other races, and 1.17% from two or more races. Hispanic or Latino of any race were 0.84% of the population.

There were 6,622 households, out of which 27.7% had children under the age of 18 living with them, 49.6% were married couples living together, 11.0% had a female householder with no husband present, and 35.8% were non-families. Of all households, 30.5% were made up of individuals, and 14.7% had someone living alone who was 65 years of age or older. The average household size was 2.38 and the average family size was 2.98.

In the town, the population was spread out, with 21.7% under the age of 18, 6.6% from 18 to 24, 27.9% from 25 to 44, 24.3% from 45 to 64, and 19.5% who were 65 years of age or older. The median age was 41 years. For every 100 females, there were 89.4 males. For every 100 females age 18 and over, there were 85.3 males.

The median income for a household in the town was $79,432 and $50,384 per capita as of 2021. About 6.6% persons were below the poverty line. 28.9% of the population had a bachelor's degree or higher and 91% had a high school degree.

Males had a median income of $38,201 versus $29,736 for females. About 6.5% of families and 9.0% of the population were below the poverty line, including 11.4% of those under age 18 and 11.6% of those age 65 or over.

== Business ==
Fairhaven is the home of the Acushnet Company, a world-renowned manufacturer of golf equipment under the brand name Titleist (now owned by Fila). Fairhaven is also home to Nye Lubricants, a firm dealing in industrial lubricants and whose history dates back to 1844 and the whaling industry.

== Government ==
Fairhaven is located in the 10th Bristol state representative district, which includes all of Fairhaven, Marion, Mattapoisett, and Rochester, as well as a portion of Middleborough. The town is represented in the state senate in the 2nd Bristol-Plymouth district, which includes the city of New Bedford and the towns of Acushnet, Dartmouth, Fairhaven, and Mattapoisett. On the national level, Fairhaven is a part of Massachusetts's 9th congressional district, and is currently represented by William R. Keating. The state's senior member of the United States Senate is Elizabeth Warren, and its junior senator is Ed Markey.

Fairhaven is governed by a representative town meeting, run by a five-person select board (expanded from three seats in 2022) and a town administrator. The town has one public library (the Millicent Library), one fire station, a central police department, and one post office (zip code 02719). The Fairhaven police department is located on Byrant Lane, a half-mile east of the center of town. The police, fire, and rescue all are located at the same site on Washington Street.

== Education ==
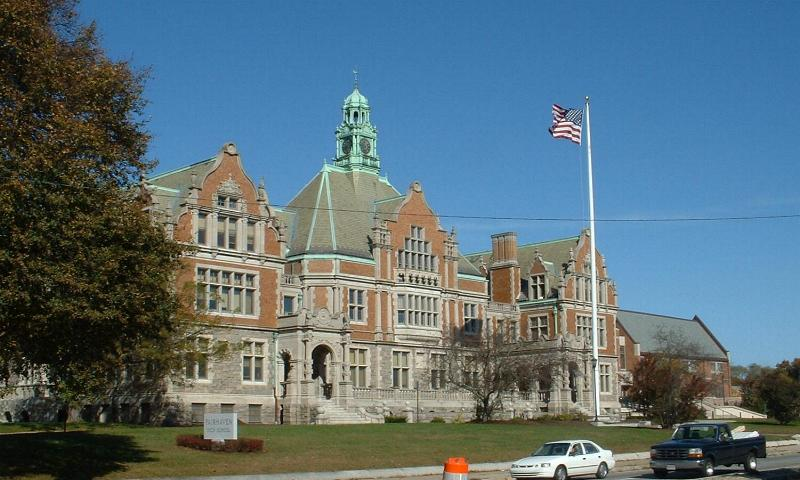
Fairhaven High School

Fairhaven's four public schools are all part of the Fairhaven Public School District. The town has two elementary schools; East Fairhaven and Leroy L. Wood, one middle school, Elizabeth Hastings; and one high school, Fairhaven High.

Fairhaven High School, donated by Rogers in 1906, is the most recognizable landmark in the town, given its prominent location on Route 6 (Huttleston Avenue) and its impressive appearance. The school's teams are known as the Blue Devils, and their colors are royal blue and white. In addition to the public school, prospective high school students may choose to attend either Greater New Bedford Regional Vocational-Technical High School ("Voc-Tech") in New Bedford or Bristol County Agricultural High School ("Bristol Aggie") in Dighton, free of charge.

Two recent former elementary schools include Oxford School (closed 2007) and Rogers School (closed 2013). Oxford School opened in 1896 until it was merged with the newly reconstructed East Fairhaven School in 2007. Rogers School opened in 1885 as the first building donated to the town by Henry Huttleston Rogers. It remained open until 2013 when, like Oxford and East Fairhaven Schools, its student body was consolidated with that of LeRoy Wood School. As the new Wood School building was being constructed, its staff and students moved to the Oxford School building for the 2012–13 academic year. Oxford School was converted to residential apartments in 2022 and was added to the National Register of Historic Places in 2023.

The town is also home to Saint Joseph's School, a Roman Catholic parochial school which provides an education from nursery through eighth-grade. The school is operated by the nearby Saint Joseph Church.

The Northeast Maritime Institute based in Fairhaven offers a two-year program in Nautical Science and prepares students to work as deck officers or captains aboard ships. NMI owns several buildings in the center of town, including a former Unitarian Church and former bank.

== Notable people ==
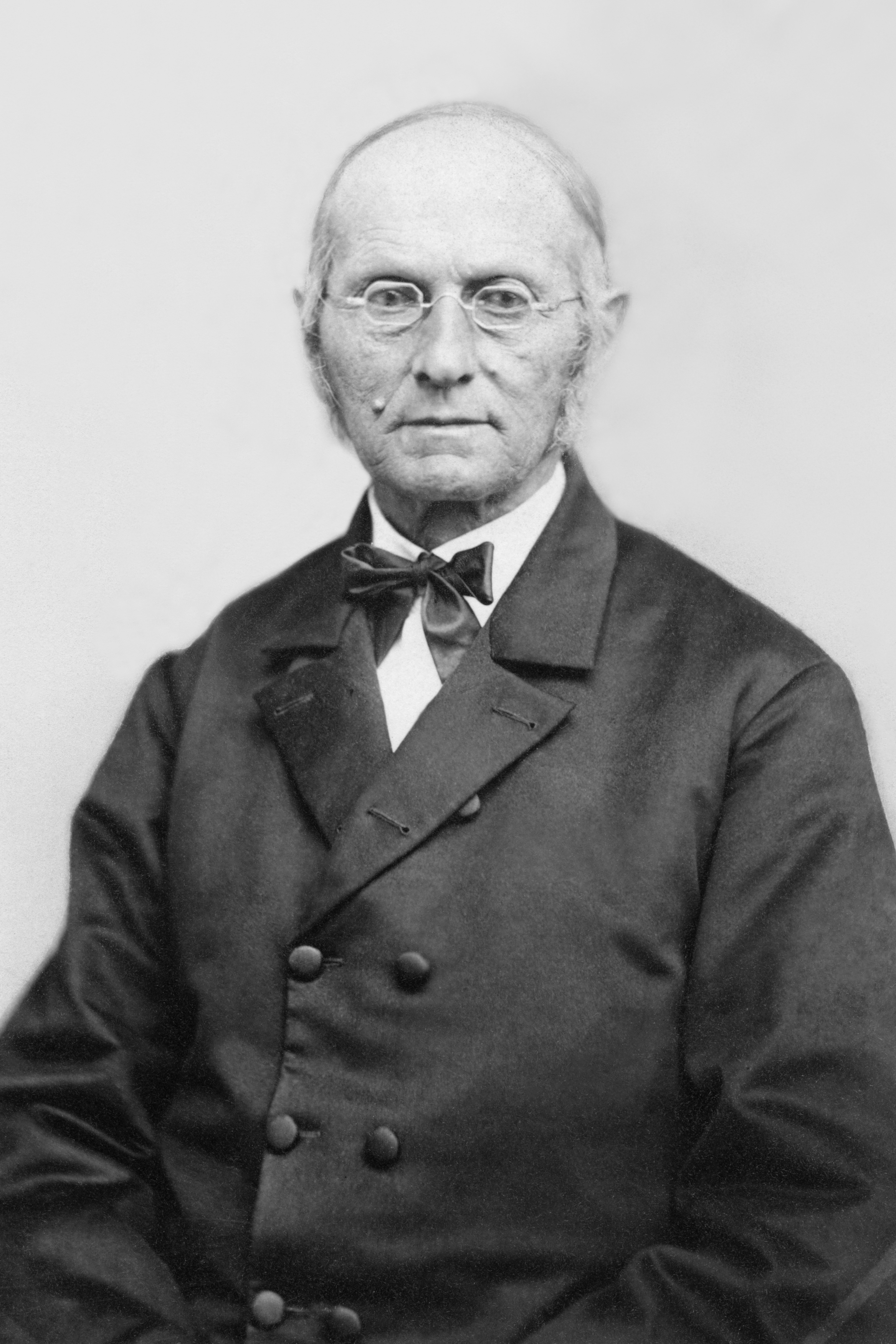
- Joseph Bates
  Joseph Bates (1792–1872), sea captain, minister, temperance advocate, and reformer who was a co-founder of the Seventh-day Adventist Church and the theological architect of Sabbatarian Adventist theology; his boyhood home (191 Main Street) is now a museum dedicated to his life and work
- John Cook Bennett (1804–1867), physician and a ranking and influential (but short-lived and controversial) leader in the Latter Day Saint movement, who acted as second in command to Joseph Smith for a brief period in the early 1840s
- William Bradford (1823–1892), marine painter and photographer
- The 1st Baron Fairhaven (1896–1966), multi-millionaire businessman, horse breeder, and art collector who mainly lived in Great Britain; born in Fairhaven but educated in Great Britain, he restored and expanded Anglesey Abbey, his country seat, in Cambridgeshire. Lord Fairhaven was the grandson of Henry Huttleston Rogers
- Paul Delano (1775–1842), a sea captain, moved to Chile in 1819 where he became an important part of that country's early Navy
- Warren Delano Jr. (1809–1898), a native of the town, Delano became a prominent trader with Russell & Company, smuggling opium in China. He was the maternal grandfather of US President Franklin Delano Roosevelt and created Fairhaven's Riverside Cemetery, where many Delano family members are buried
- Mark Dion (born 1961), noted conceptual artist and sculptor, known for his installations using found human-made and natural objects
- Carl Etelman (1900–1963), football back and coach
- William H. Hand Jr. (1875–1946), one of the most prolific yacht designers of the twentieth century, and whose office was in Fairhaven
- William Le Baron Jenney (1832–1907), architect and engineer who became known as the "Father of the American Skyscraper"; Fairhaven native
- Herman Melville (1819–1891), author of the classic novel Moby-Dick, twenty-one year old Melville stayed briefly in a rooming house in Fairhaven and on January 3, 1841, set sail from here in the whaleship Acushnet.
- "John" Manjiro Nakahama (1827–1898), the first Japanese person to live in America
- Albert Pike (1809–1891), attorney, soldier, writer, and prominent Freemason. Pike is the only Confederate military officer or figure to be honored with an outdoor statue in Washington, D.C. (in Judiciary Square). A Massachusetts native, he taught school in Fairhaven as a young man
- Christopher Reeve (1952–2004), of Superman fame, the summer resident kept a sailboat, the 40-foot (12 m) sloop-rigged Chandelle, at a Fairhaven shipyard and sometimes flew into New Bedford Regional Airport to pick it up or to stay in town during a stopover en route to Martha's Vineyard
- Franklin D. Roosevelt (1882–1945), 32nd President of the United States; summer resident
- Gil Santos (1938–2018), longtime radio play-by-play announcer for the New England Patriots of the National Football League and morning sports reporter for WBZ radio in Boston; Fairhaven native
- Frances Ford Seymour (1908–1950), wife of actor Henry Fonda and mother of actress Jane Fonda and actor Peter Fonda; lived in Fairhaven for several years with family members and attended Fairhaven High School
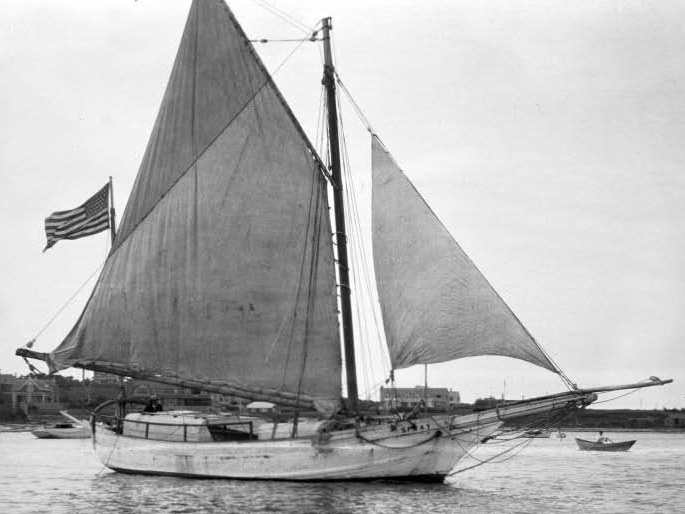
- Captain Slocum's Spray
  Joshua Slocum (1844–1909), the first man to sail alone around the world, and his ship, the Spray. The Spray originally belonged to Captain Eben Pierce of Fairhaven, a whaling captain, who gave the derelict boat, slowly deteriorating in a ship cradle in a meadow on Fairhaven's Poverty Point, to his friend, Captain Slocum. Slocum spent thirteen months in Fairhaven while working on the Spray, making her fit for open-ocean sailing. Fairhaven oak formed much of the boat's refitted structure. The Spray and her one-man crew returned after nearly three and a half years to the very cedar spile that was used for her launch.
- Noah Stoddard (1755–1850), a privateer captain in the American Revolution
- Theodore Thomas (1835–1905), American's first renowned orchestra leader and founder of the Chicago Symphony Orchestra, had a Fairhaven summer home surrounded by spacious gardens from 1887 until shortly before his death in 1905
- Mary Ann Tripp (1810–1906), the first American woman to sail around the world and the first American woman to visit China while sailing with her husband, a merchant ship captain
- William H. Whitfield (1804–1886), the sea captain who rescued Manjiro Nakahama and with whom Manjiro lived during his time in Fairhaven

== Sister city ==
- Tosashimizu, Kōchi, Japan, since 1987

== See also ==
- Baron Fairhaven
- Cara Rogers Broughton
- Fairhaven Branch Railroad
- Gideon Nye
- Kanawha (1899), the yacht
- Lady Fairhaven
- Mary (Mai) Huttleston Rogers Coe
- Urban H. Broughton
- Urban Huttleston Broughton, 1st Baron Fairhaven
- Urban H. Broughton Memorials
- Whale oil
- Whaling in the United States
