= Siosateki Havea Mataʻu =

Tongan rugby union player

- Born: May 12, 1979 (age 47) Nomuka, Tonga
- Height: 1.84 m (6 ft 1/2 in)
- Weight: 110 kg (240 lb)

Rugby union career
- Position: Prop
International career
Years	Team	Apps	(Points)
2007	Tonga		

Siosateki Havea Mata'u (born 12 May 1979 in Nomuka) is a Tongan rugby union prop. He is a member of the Tonga national rugby union team and participated with the squad at the 2007 Rugby World Cup.
