= Millicent Library =

- U.S. National Register of Historic Places
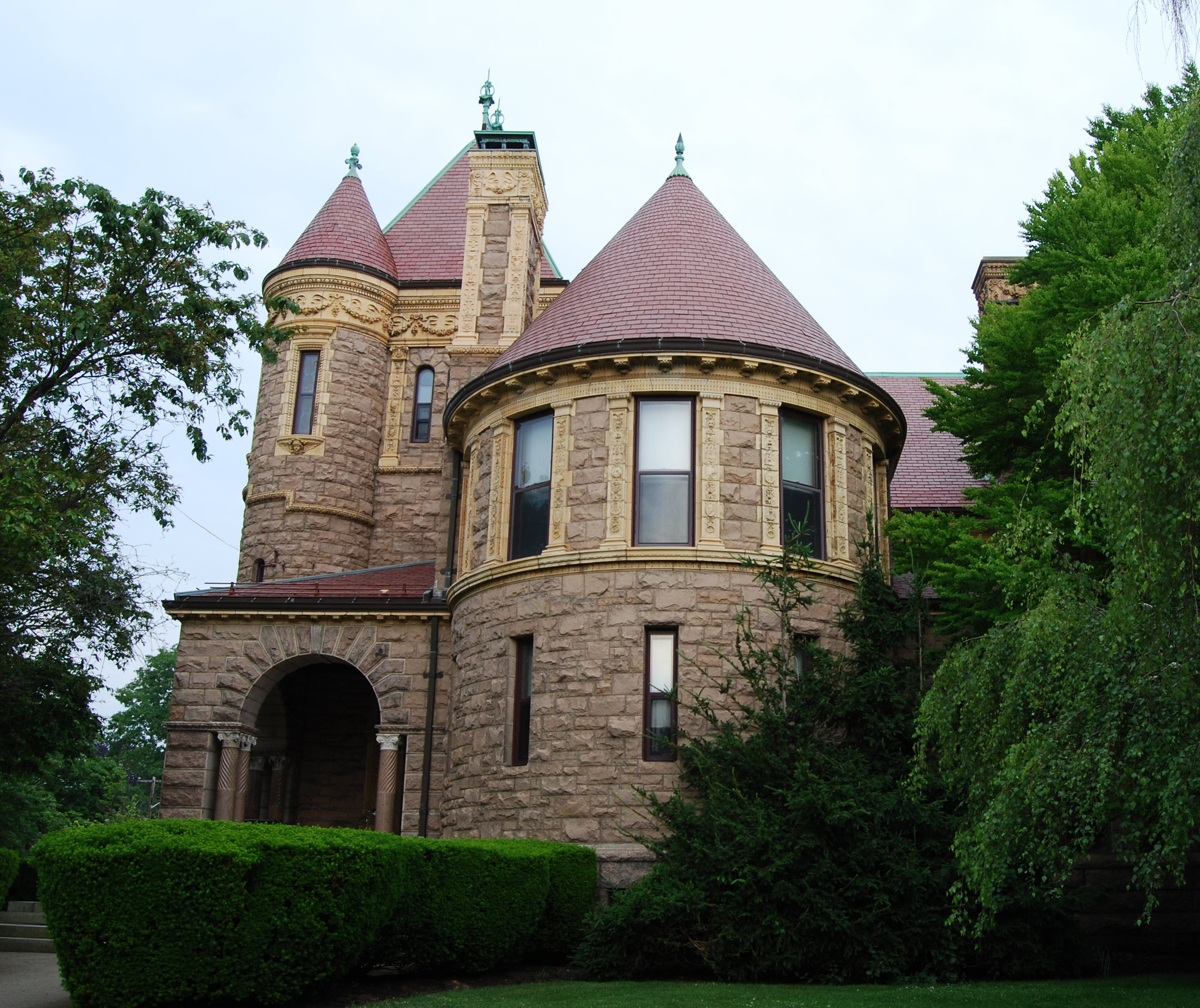
- Location: 45 Center St; Fairhaven, Massachusetts
- Coordinates: 41.63572°N 70.90344°W
- Architect: Charles Brigham
- Architectural style: Richardsonian Romanesque
- NRHP reference No.: 86001051
- Added to NRHP: May 15, 1986

Millicent Library is a community library and nationally registered historic place in Fairhaven, Massachusetts. It was donated to Fairhaven by the family of Millicent Gifford Rogers, the youngest daughter of Abbie Gifford and wealthy industrialist Henry Huttleston Rogers. Millicent died of heart failure in 1890 when she was seventeen years old. The library was dedicated on January 30, 1893. It was designed by Charles Brigham in the Richardsonian Romanesque style.

== History ==
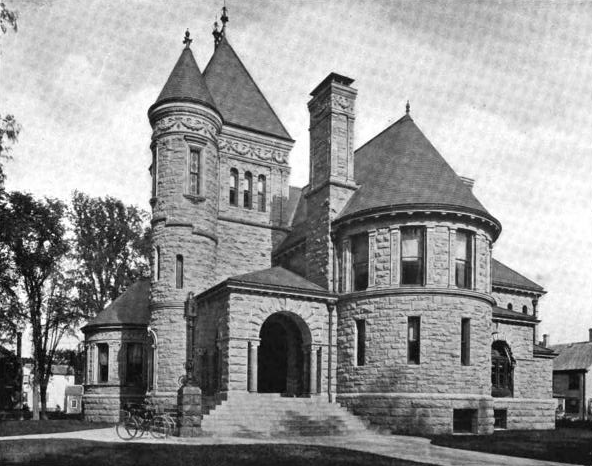
The Millicent Library in 1899.

The year that Millicent Rogers died, her family acquired land and began planning the Millicent Library. The cornerstone was laid in September, 1891 at a quiet morning ceremony with only the family and their clergyman, Rev. J.M. Leighton, in attendance. After prayer, Millie's little brother, Harry, set the cornerstone. Within its confines were a sketch of Millicent, a tracing of the Rogers' ancestry, and a copy of the Fairhaven Star carrying a picture of the proposed building.

The Millicent Library describes the memorial window as follows:

"In the Library, just to the left of the main entrance, is a stunning stained-glass window made by Clayton and Bell of London. In the central panel is the figure of Erato, the Muse of Poetry, and her features bear a striking resemblance to those of the girl to whose memory the library was erected."

Mark Twain extolled the library as "ideal".

== See also ==
- National Register of Historic Places listings in Bristol County, Massachusetts
