= Acushnet River =

River in Massachusetts, United States

Coordinates: 41°40′51″N 70°55′3″W

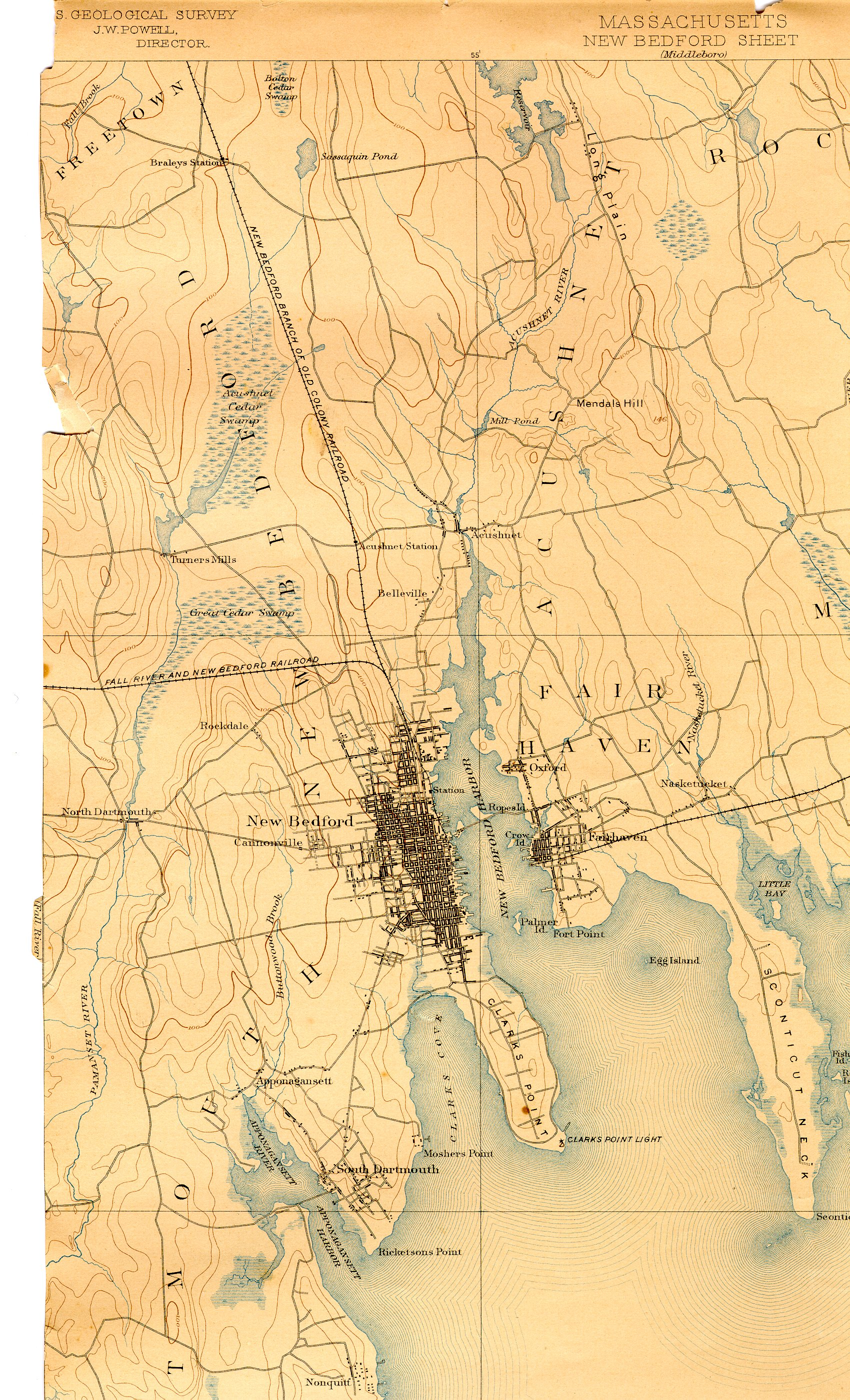
Acushnet River (lower section) from an 1893 survey

The Acushnet River is the largest river, 8.6 miles (13.8 km) long, flowing into Buzzards Bay in southeastern Massachusetts, in the United States. The name "Acushnet" comes from the Wampanoag or Algonquian word, "Cushnea", meaning "as far as the waters", a word that was used by the original owners of the land in describing the extent of the parcel they intended to sell to the English settlers from the nearby Plymouth Colony. Quite naturally, the English mistook "Cushnea" for a fixed placename or the name of a specific river.

== Path of the river ==
The source of the Acushnet River is Long Pond in Lakeville, Massachusetts. The root tributary, Squam Brook, flows out of Long Pond and through the settlement called Freetown before it fills the New Bedford Reservoir in the town of Acushnet. From the reservoir, the river continues southward, forming the dividing-line between Acushnet and the city of New Bedford. Then it divides New Bedford, on its western bank, from Fairhaven, on its eastern bank, before spilling into Buzzards Bay, an arm of the Atlantic Ocean.

== The six bridges ==
The river is crossed by bridges six times. There are three short bridges in Acushnet, where the river is narrow. As the river leaves Acushnet, it widens to form an estuarine harbor, New Bedford harbor, which is flanked by New Bedford and Fairhaven. Shortly after the river leaves Acushnet, a larger bridge, the Coggeshall Street Bridge, crosses between Fairhaven and New Bedford. The fifth bridge is one that carries a large limited-access highway, Interstate 195, across the river, about 150 metres south of the Coggeshall Street span.

The sixth and last bridge is a complex of three small bridges that cross from islet to islet across the breadth of New Bedford harbor, carrying US Route 6. Beginning on the western (New Bedford) side of the river, there is a short bridge over the shallow gut dividing the New Bedford bank from Fish Island. The second part of the traverse involves crossing the main river channel between Fish Island and Pope's Island via the New Bedford-Fairhaven Bridge, a swing bridge that originally opened in 1902. Finally, the road crosses the shallow eastern passage from Pope's Island to Fairhaven along the low-lying Pope's Island Bridge.

== The hurricane barrier ==
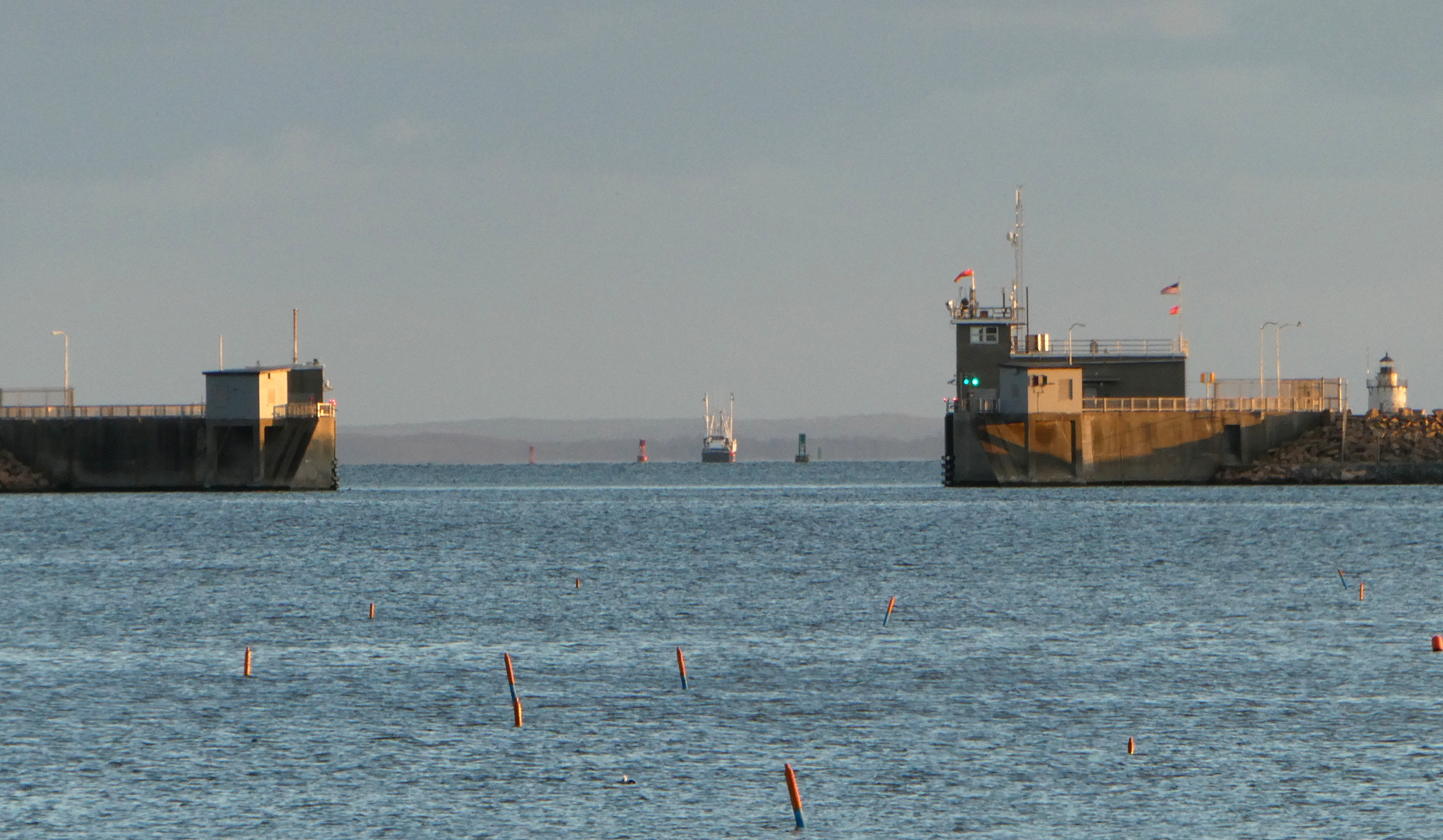
The main opening of the barrier

Beginning in 1958, the New Bedford Harbor Hurricane Barrier was built from a point about 300 feet north of Fort Phoenix, in Fairhaven, to Gifford Street on the New Bedford coast. The 20-foot high barrier continues onto land, where three large doors allow street traffic to pass through during calm seas. The longer segment continues along the New Bedford coast to just before Frederick Street. A discontiguous segment protects the top of Clark's Cove in New Bedford, roughly to the Dartmouth border.

The barrier consists of an arc of riprap and fill, approximately three kilometres long, surmounted by a service road. At the center of the marine structure is a control tower and a set of hydraulically operated doors that can be closed, when necessary, to shut out the surge of seawater that typically accompanies a major storm or hurricane. Taken as a whole, the barrier is the largest stone structure on the East Coast of the United States.

== Historical significance ==
Historically, the river's banks were home to many mills, especially on the New Bedford side of the river. The river's mouth, which forms a small but well-sheltered harbor, has long served as the home port of New Bedford's commercial fishing fleet. It is also the birthplace of New Bedford's whaling industry; the Dartmouth, the first ship whose keel was laid in New Bedford, first set sail on this river. The ship would go on to fame as one of those involved in the Boston Tea Party. On the eastern (Fairhaven) shore, the mouth of the river is guarded by Fort Phoenix, a fortification that was involved, in 1775, in the first naval engagement of the American Revolutionary War.
