= Kanawha and Pocahontas Railroad =

The Kanawha and Pocahontas Railroad Company was incorporated in West Virginia in 1898 by either a son or the estate of Charles Pratt to reach new coal mining territory on land which was owned and/or leased by Gallego Coal & Land Company, Charles Pratt and Company, and other investors based in New York City.

The line was constructed in 1902 as a narrow gauge railroad and originated at the mainline of the Chesapeake and Ohio Railway (C&O) at what was called Paint Creek Junction along the Kanawha River. It ran 14 miles (23 km) along a tributary of the river called Paint Creek to Kingston, crossing the Kanawha-Fayette county line about one mile south of Burnwell.

Represented by attorney (and former West Virginia governor) William A. MacCorkle, industrialist Henry Huttleston Rogers, acting on behalf of Charles Pratt and Company, negotiated its lease of the entire line to the C&O. It later came under ownership of the C&O, and was later known as the C&O's Paint Creek Branch.

Around the same time, Henry Rogers was also involved with another nearby short-line railroad, the Deepwater Railway, which ran up Loup Creek in Fayette County. It also connected with the C&O along the Kanawha River, and was run by the C&O in its early years. However, the Deepwater Railway, headed by mining manager and developer William Nelson Page, and funded by Rogers, was eventually extended east to the West Virginia-Virginia state line, at which point it connected with the new Tidewater Railway, a line which Page and Rogers built to connect all the way east across Virginia to a new coal pier at Sewell's Point in the harbor of Hampton Roads. In 1907, they were combined to form the Virginian Railway, now a portion of the Norfolk Southern Railway.
