= Wamsutta =

Native American leader

Wamsutta (c. 1634–1662), known to the New England colonists as Alexander, was the eldest son of Massasoit (meaning Great Leader) Ousa Mequin of the Pokanoket within the Wampanoag nation, and the brother of Metacomet (or Metacom).

== Life ==
The name of Wamsutta and his mark appear on the 1652 deed of purchase of Old Dartmouth.

Wamsutta was born circa 1634. He was the eldest son of Massasoit Ousa Mequin, leader of the Pokanoket, and he married Weetamoo.

Upon Massasoit's death, Wamsutta became the leader of the Pokanoket, overseeing tribes in territory covering parts of present-day Massachusetts and Rhode Island. Wamsutta, whom the English called Alexander, agreed to uphold the peace established by his father. Facing a decline in the fur trade, he sought to maintain the Pokanoket's influence by selling land to colonists. The English accused him of conspiring with the Narragansetts to stage an attack. In 1662, the Plymouth Court summoned Wamsutta for unauthorized land negotiations and detained him. Following his interrogation, Wamsutta fell ill and died under uncertain circumstances.

The exact cause of his death remains uncertain, but his brother Metacomet, who succeeded him, believed he was poisoned. Wamsutta's death was among the factors that eventually led to King Philip's War in 1675. Historical accounts differ on the circumstances of his death. Some sources claim that Governor Josiah Winslow may have poisoned or tortured Wamsutta, perceiving him as a political threat. However, this theory is debated, as Edward Winslow and Governor William Bradford previously maintained peaceful relations with Massasoit.

Metacomet, known as King Philip to the colonists and officials at Plymouth, signed an agreement with the English in 1662, vowing not to provoke or initiate war with other native groups without cause, an agreement similar to those made by Wamsutta and his father. The colonists, in return, agreed to advise and aid Philip. However, the alliance was uneasy, and hostilities between natives and colonists continued to escalate.

== Legacy ==
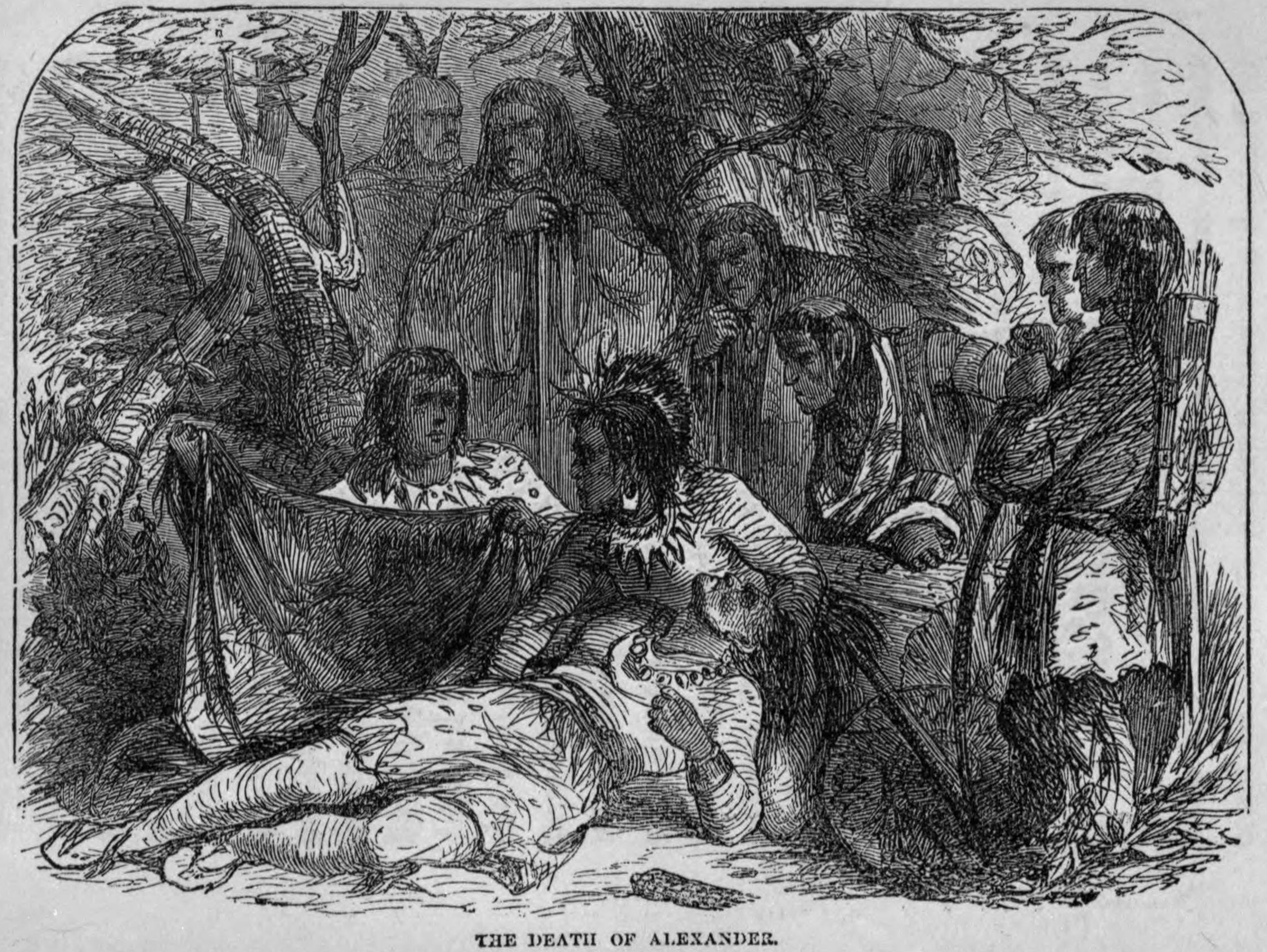
The death of Wamsutta as depicted by Harper's Magazine in 1857.

Wamsutta's name has been used for several businesses and places:

- In 1846, the Wamsutta Company's textile mill opened in New Bedford.
- In 1861, Henry H. Rogers and his partner Charles Ellis of Massachusetts named their venture near Oil City, Pennsylvania the Wamsutta Oil Refinery. Rogers later became a principal in John D. Rockefeller's Standard Oil.
- USS Wamsutta was a United States Navy steamer in commission from 1863 to 1865.
- In 1866, the Wamsutta Club was founded in New Bedford as a club for affluent residents.
- From 1945 to 1975, Camp Wamsutta, a summer camp, operated in Charlton, Massachusetts.
- Since 1975, Wamsutta Estates has been a residential development in Charlton, Massachusetts.
- In 1997, Wamsutta Middle School was built in Attleboro, Massachusetts.
- Currently, Wamsutta is a brand name of textile products marketed by Springs Global.
- Wamsutta Trail on Mount Washington, NH

Activist Frank James, who founded the National Day of Mourning protesting the myth of the First Thanksgiving in 1970, used Wamsutta as his native name.

== See also ==
- List of early settlers of Rhode Island
