= McClintocksville, Pennsylvania =

Coordinates: 41.525°N 79.606°W

McClintockville, Pennsylvania was a small community in Cornplanter Township in Venango County located in the state of Pennsylvania in the United States.

== History ==
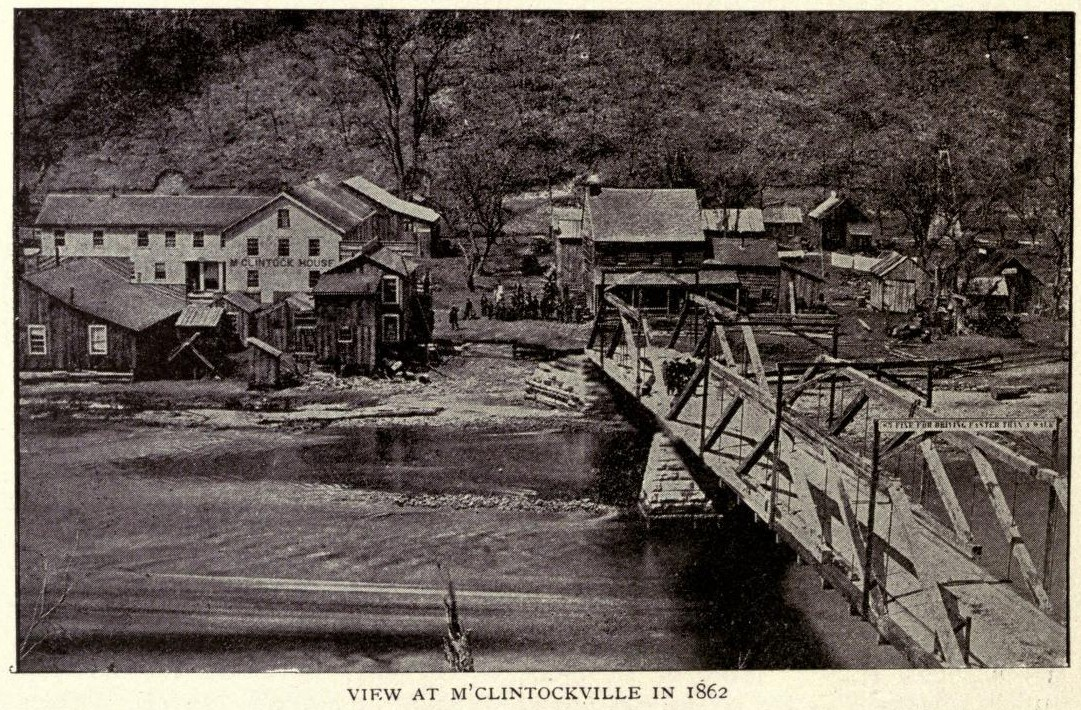
McClintocksville in 1862

Venango County, Pennsylvania was home to an oil boom in the years following discovery of natural oil (petroleum) in the mid-1850s.

George Bissell, a Yale University chemistry professor, and Edwin L. Drake, a former railroad conductor, made the first successful use of a drilling rig on August 28, 1859 at Titusville, Pennsylvania. This single well soon exceeded the entire cumulative oil output of Europe since the 1650s. The principal product of the oil was kerosene.

In 1861, McClintockville was the location of Rogers & Ellis, the first business venture of Henry Huttleston Rogers, who became a leading American businessman, industrialist and financier, with his partner Charles P. Ellis. Rogers and his young wife Abbie Palmer Gifford Rogers lived in a one-room shack there along Oil Creek for several years.

Shortly later, Rogers met oil pioneer Charles Pratt who purchased the entire output of the tiny Wamsutta Oil Refinery. In 1867, Rogers joined Pratt in forming Charles Pratt and Company, which was purchased by Standard Oil in 1874. Rogers became one of the key men in John D. Rockefeller’s Standard Oil Trust.

After joining Standard Oil, Rogers invested heavily in various industries, including copper, steel, mining, and railways. The Virginian Railway is widely considered his final life's achievement. Rogers amassed a great fortune, estimated at over $100 million, and became one of the wealthiest men in the United States.

He was also a generous philanthropist, providing many public works for his hometown of Fairhaven and financially assisting helping such notables as Mark Twain, Helen Keller, and Booker T. Washington.

Near McClintockville and Oil City, in western Pennsylvania, there is a Pennsylvania State Park and many heritage sites to tell the story and memorialize the people of the oil boom of the late 19th and early 20th centuries.
