= Rockefeller, Andrews & Flagler =

- Industry: Petroleum Refining
- Founded: 1867; 158 years ago in Cleveland, Ohio
- Founder: Henry M. Flagler; John D. Rockefeller; Samuel Andrews; William Rockefeller
- Successor: Standard Oil

Rockefeller, Andrews & Flagler was a petroleum refiner formed in 1867 in Cleveland, Ohio, by John D. Rockefeller, William Rockefeller, Samuel Andrews, and Henry M. Flagler, a direct predecessor of the Standard Oil Company.

Flagler’s step-brother Stephen V. Harkness was a silent partner who did not take an active role in running the business, but was the second largest stockholder next to JD Rockefeller.

By 1868, Rockefeller, Andrews & Flagler was the largest petroleum refiner in the world. The partners are credited with recognizing the importance of utilizing and marketing all of the by-products of the refining process, and gaining market and pricing control through shipping rates. In a contract signed on June 4, 1868, Rockefeller, Andrews & Flagler along with Cleveland's other two largest oil refiners - Clark, Payne & Company; and Westlake, Hutchins & Company - were given a 25% of the interest in the Allegheny Transportation Company in return for $1. The Allegheny Transportation Company at this time was controlled by Jay Gould. This stock was worth $62,222. Their failed South Improvement Company scheme in 1871 in secret collusion with the Pennsylvania Railroad led independent producers to revolt in western Pennsylvania in early 1872 and earned Rockefeller, the highest-profile partner, much bad public opinion.

However, the partners deployed other more successfully calculated and forceful approaches, which included buying out the competition and the formation of the various Standard Oil companies. By 1879, the Standard Oil Company did about 90 percent of the oil refining in the United States.

== See also ==
- Rockefeller family
