= Godfrey M. Hyams =

Godfrey M. Hyams (1859–1927) was an American metallurgist, civil engineer, financier, and philanthropist.

== Early life ==
Hyams was born in Baltimore, Maryland. His family moved to Boston, Massachusetts while he was a child. He graduated from Boston English High School and attended Harvard College, where he graduated in 1881.

== Career ==
Hyams became an investment banker based in Boston and specialized in natural resources. He was responsible for the growth of such companies as the Anaconda Mining Company. In the early twentieth century, he was the principal financial manager for the construction of the Deepwater Railway in West Virginia and the Tidewater Railway in Virginia, which were combined in 1907 to form the Virginian Railway (VGN), completed in 1909. The new railroad, ostensibly headed by coal mining manager William Nelson Page of Ansted, West Virginia, was financed almost entirely from the personal fortune of a silent partner, industrialist Henry Huttleston Rogers, a native of Fairhaven, Massachusetts. It opened up major new areas of bituminous coal in some of the most rugged terrain in southern West Virginia for shipment to Hampton Roads, where a new coal pier was built at Sewell's Point.

Godfrey M. Hyams remained an officer of the Virginian Railway for the rest of his life. He married Mary Wilson Hyams, and she died in Boston on May 15, 1934. Hyams died in Boston on October 7, 1927.

== Legacy ==
He left the bulk of his estate in trust for charitable purposes. It was one of the largest philanthropic gifts ever made in Massachusetts.

His funds and those of a sister were combined later, and are now handled by The Hyams Foundation, Inc.
