= Allegheny Transportation Company =

19th century American oil pipeline company

The Allegheny Transportation Company was a pipeline company that operated in the 1860s and 1870s as a bulk distributor of crude oil. It became the Pennsylvania Transportation Company in 1872 upon merger with Commonwealth Oil & Pipe Company. The company gathered crude oil from the oil fields in Northwest Pennsylvania and transported it via pipelines to railheads. It was the largest such company in the oil regions during this time, and was operated under the administration of Henry Harley. By 1871, it controlled 500 miles of pipelines in Northwest Pennsylvania.

== State charter ==
A charter from the State of Pennsylvania in 1864 gave the company a unique right to carry oil via pipelines to railroad yards.

== Jay Gould's involvement ==
In 1868, Jay Gould bought control of the company for $250,000 in an effort to gain increased rail traffic over the Erie Railroad via the Atlantic and Great Western Railroad. The Erie Railroad was competing for traffic with the New York Central Railroad via the Lake Shore and Michigan Southern Railway and with the Pennsylvania Railroad.

In a contract signed on June 4, 1868, John D. Rockefeller's firm (Rockefeller, Andrews & Flagler) along with Cleveland's other two largest oil refiners - Clark, Payne & Company; and Westlake, Hutchins & Company - were given a 25% of the interest in the Allegheny Transportation Company in return for $1. This stock was worth $62,222.

On July 2, 1868, Jay Gould took control of the Erie Railroad. Gould's gift would help finance Rockefeller, Andrews & Flagler through the next two lean years.

== See also ==
- Oil City, Pennsylvania

== Bibliography ==
- Churella, Albert J. (2012). The Pennsylvania Railroad, Volume 1: Building an Empire, 1846-1917. University of Pennsylvania Press. ISBN 978-0812243482.
- Hawke, David Freeman (1980). John D. The Founding Father of the Rockefellers. Harper & Row. ISBN 978-0060118136.
