= Astral Oil Works =

Former American producer of lamp oil

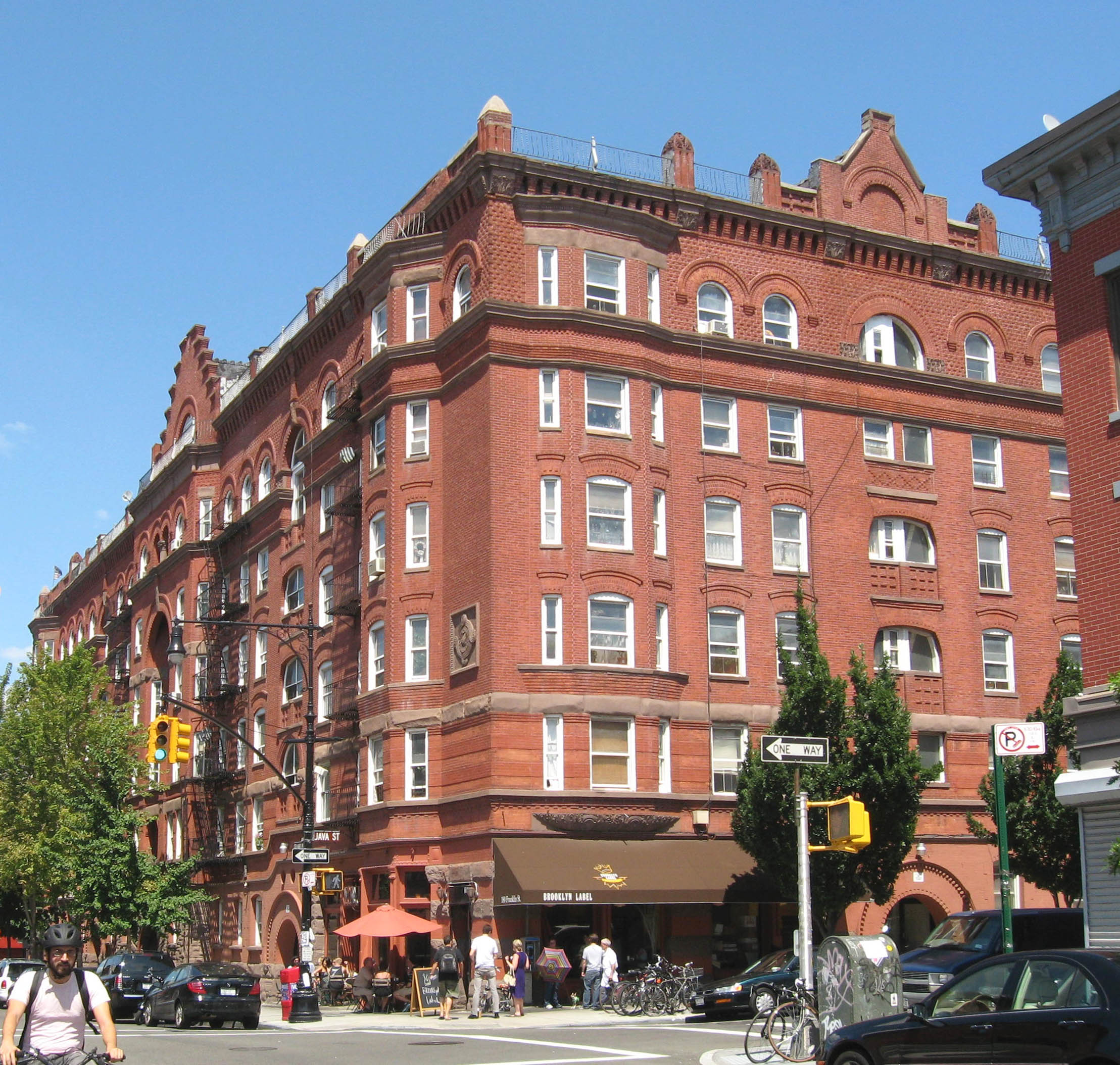
- Employee housing at the Astral Apartments
- Industry: Oil industry
- Headquarters: United States
- Products: Illuminating oil
- Owners: Charles Pratt

Astral Oil Works was an American oil company specializing in illuminating oil, and based in Brooklyn, New York. Astral Oil was a high-quality kerosene used in lamps and noted for being relatively safe. It was founded by Charles Pratt. Charles Pratt and Company (including Astral Oil) became part of John D. Rockefeller’s Standard Oil Trust in 1874, although the fact that Astral Oil was a New York branch of Standard Oil in Ohio was not made public until 1892.

== History ==
=== 1850s-1860s: Background and formation ===
Astral Oil Works was founded in the Greenpoint section of Brooklyn, New York, by Charles Pratt. Pratt was a pioneer of the petroleum industry who later formed Charles Pratt and Company with Henry H. Rogers. As a young man, Pratt had joined a company in Boston, Massachusetts which specialized in paints and whale oil products. In 1850 or 1851 he moved to New York City, where he worked for a similar company. Pratt realized that whale oil could be replaced by petroleum ("natural oil") distillates to light lamps. He became a pioneer of the petroleum industry as new wells were established in western Pennsylvania in the 1860s. He soon established his kerosene refinery, Astral Oil Works, in Brooklyn, New York. In the mid-1860s, Pratt met two aspiring young men, Charles Ellis and Henry H. Rogers in western Pennsylvania, and later purchased the entire future output of their small venture, Wamsutta Oil Refinery near Oil City, at a fixed price. Pratt had previously bought whale oil from Ellis in Fairhaven, Massachusetts, and had done business with Rogers in the Pennsylvania oil fields starting in 1861. After five years in the oil fields, in 1866 Pratt asked Rogers to come to the Brooklyn side of Pratt's business.

In 1867, Pratt built “America’s first modern oil refinery (Astral Oil) on the banks of Newtown Creek.” Over 50 other oil refineries were then founded along the East River from Williamsburg to Greenpoint, in the same area. While spending eight years in the Brooklyn refinery starting in 1866, Rogers, according to The New York Times, “invented the machinery by which naphtha was first successfully separated from the crude oil. This invention not only made the way for all that has been done since [in 1909] in the use of naphtha and its kindred products, but it made the handling and use of the residual oil far safer than it had ever before, because the volatile constituent had been removed." Rogers moved steadily from foreman to manager, and then superintendent of Pratt's Astral Oil Refinery. Pratt finally gave Rogers an interest in the business. In 1867, with Henry Rogers as a partner, he established the firm of Charles Pratt and Company. In 1869, Pratt trademarked “Pratt’s Astral Oil.” On August 21, 1869, Charles Pratt wrote to the editor of The New York Times that in the Board of Health meeting that month, the company's astral oil came in for "an unintentional consure" after the name was confounded with other parties. The president of the Metropolitan Board of Health apologized for the error within several days, at a meeting on August 25, as it was DEVOE'S patent petroleum which had been deemed unsafe in an investigation, with "Astral" oil not analyzed by the board. The error resulted because the firm DEVOE & PRATT had been dissolved, with the different partners selling different patent oil canned in the same manner, and "sold in Fulton-street at neighboring stores.

=== 1870s: Spread of the Astral Oil brand ===
Specializing in illuminating oil, which had earlier been derived from whale oil, the products of the Astral Oil Works kerosene refinery became famous worldwide in the late 19th century. Company advertising used the slogan, "The holy lamps of Tibet are primed with Astral Oil." In September 1870, Astral Oil was exhibited at the American Institute Fair, after Charles Pratt of No. 108 Fulton-street had a "splendid array of specimens of illuminating oils" displayed.

The Pratt's Astral Oil Guards, numbering 200 men, were organized on the night of August 30, 1871 on Long Island. Mr. Walter of the machine department was elected captain, with most of the men employed at the Pratt establishment at Hunter's Point.

Around 10 o’clock in the evening of January 26, 1873, Pratt's Astral Oil-works on the northern Williamsburg block “bounded by North 12th and North 13th street and extending from First-street to the river” (First Street was renamed Kent Avenue in 1880) was the scene of a large fire, creating shoots of flame at the building that “formed large spiral columns of flame which shot into the air fifty feet high.” Nearby houses were far enough away to not be harmed, although great alarm was reported in the neighborhood as different barrels were heard exploding. At the time, about 250 boys and adult men were employed by Pratt, including the workers in the packing-house and box-factory. A small number were employed in the refinery. No deaths were reported due to the fire.

=== 1874-1883: Standard Oil and union busting ===
Charles Pratt and Company (including Astral Oil) became part of John D. Rockefeller’s Standard Oil Trust in 1874. However, the fact that Astral Oil was a New York branch of Standard Oil in Ohio was not made public until 1892. When the Rockefellers absorbed the Pratt interests in 1874, Pratt and Rogers began working under the auspices of Standard Oil Company, where Rogers held a number of executive positions. Pratt and Rockefeller in 1874 began to buy competing refineries in Brooklyn under the Pratt name. They succeeded in driving a number of smaller firms out of business. Around this time, the coopers’ union opposed Pratt's efforts to cut back on certain manual operations, as they were the craftsmen who made the barrels that held the oil. Pratt busted the union, and his strategies for breaking up the organization were adopted by other refineries.

In March 1881, New York City had a smelling committee make the rounds to various stills and waters in Brooklyn. At the time of the examination, the Astral oil works had 20 stills each containing 600 barrels. The Times noted that “it was said here that the noxious gases given off in condensing the petroleum were utilized as fuel to such an extent that from one-half to a whole ton of coal was saved to each furnace.” The city's Health Commissioner noted that Astral had “adopted all the known appliances, and their place was as little of a nuisance as it was possible to make it.

=== 1884-1890s: Growth, fire, and lawsuits ===
By late 1884, Pratt’s new Astral Oil Works in Williamsburg was on Bushwick Creek in the Eastern District of Brooklyn in Northern Williamsburg. The main building of the oil company ran from First-street about 300 feet to “the width of the block" from North Twelfth to North Thirteenth street. On December 21, 1884, a fire at Astral Oil was first noticed when an explosion shook houses and “broke windows for 300 feet" in front of the new Williamsburg Gas Works along North Twelfth Street. The tank on North 12th Street then had a body of flames shoot up from two naphtha tanks, each with the quantity of 2,500 barrels of naphtha in them. The fire then spread. On December 22, 1884, Pratt's Astral Oil Works in Greenpoint burned down. While the naptha storage house burned, the tin shop and refinery were saved by firemen. According to Pratt, much of the damages were insured.

On January 22, 1885, Pratt Manufacturing Company of New York filed a bill in equity against the Astral Refining Company of Oil City in the US Circuit Court of Pittsburgh, Pennsylvania. The Pratt Manufacturing Company alleged that the term “Astral” as applied to petroleum was their trademark. In April 1886, a case was heard where Pratt Manufacturing Company sued the Astral Refining Company, Limited, to stop the latter from using the words “Astral Oil” as branding with refined petroleum. The case was dismissed.

Built in 1885–1886 as affordable housing for employees of Astral Oil Works, the Astral Apartments was a massive brick and terra cotta building in the Queen Anne style featuring a three-story-high round arch recess.

=== 1900-1920: Complete absorption by Standard Oil ===
On November 11, 1905, Rogers was on the stand in the Exchange Building in the office of Walter I. Badger for three hours. He testified in a $50,000,000 lawsuit brought by Cadwallader M. Raymond and the estate of B. F. Greenough against him and other Standard Oil operators. The estate sought to recover royalties on a patent that Rogers admitted that Captain Greenough had pledged to Rogers and Pratt for a royalty contract years earlier, which rendered kerosene oil non-explosive.

Pratt founded and endowed the Pratt Institute. Under the Sherman Antitrust Act, Standard Oil Trust was broken up into 34 companies in 1911. Standard Oil's Brooklyn refinery, at 20 acres, burned down in 1919, in what may have been an intentional attempt to clear the land and draw insurance. The former site of Astral Oil Works is now the location of the Bayside Fuel Oil depot at Bushwick Inlet.

== See also ==
- Wamsutta Oil Refinery
- History of union busting in the United States
