= Unitarian Memorial Church =

Historic church in Massachusetts, United States

- U.S. National Register of Historic Places
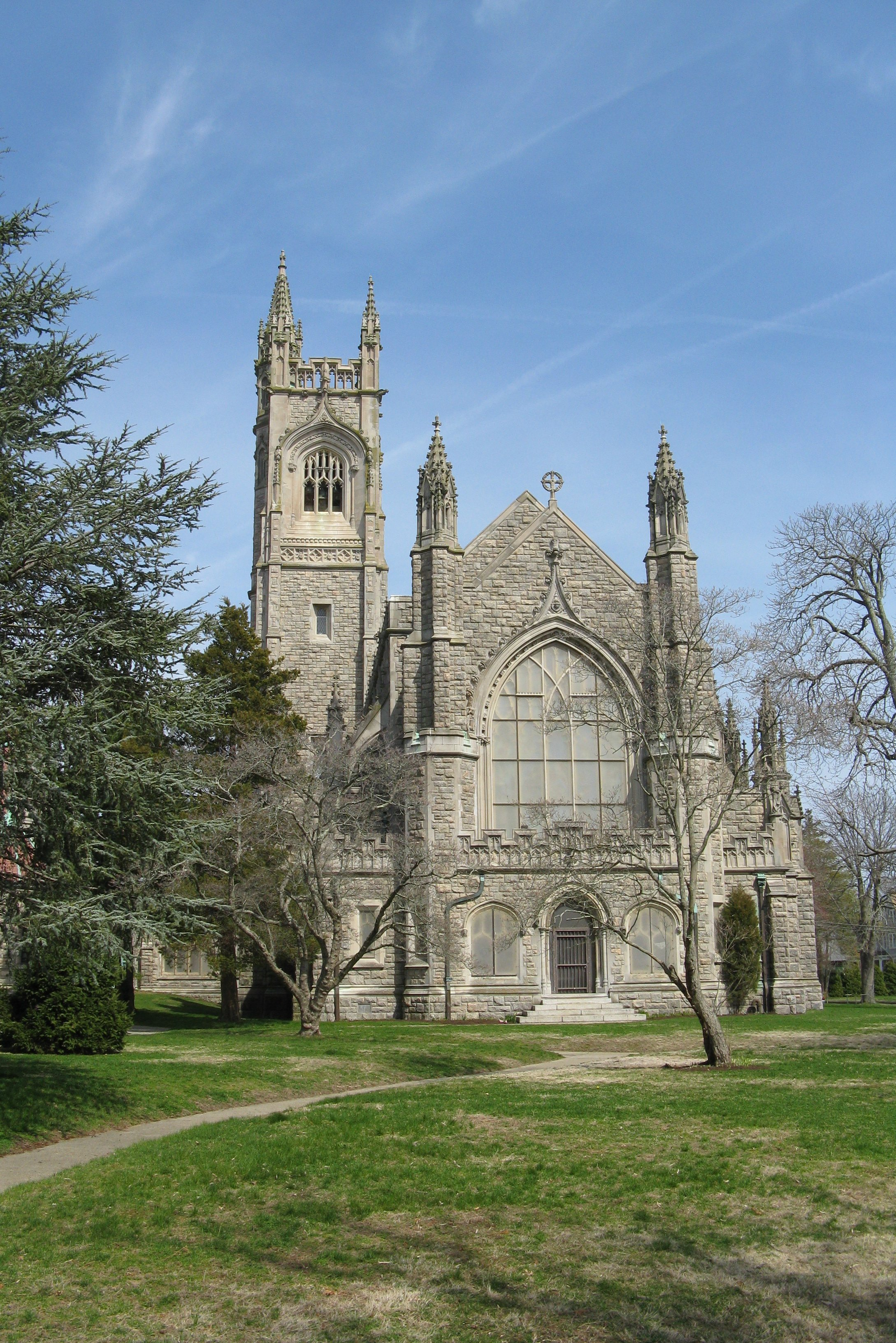
- Unitarian Memorial Church

- Location within Massachusetts Location within the United States
- Location: Fairhaven, Massachusetts
- Coordinates: 41°38′1″N 70°54′9″W
- Built: 1901
- Architect: Charles Brigham
- Architectural style: Late Gothic Revival
- Website: https://uufairhaven.org
- NRHP reference No.: 96001374
- Added to NRHP: November 22, 1996

Unitarian Memorial Church is a historic church on 102 Green Street in Fairhaven, Massachusetts, home to the Unitarian Universalist Society of Fairhaven.

The congregation was founded in 1819, moved into the Washington Street Christian Meetinghouse in 1832, and called its first minister in 1840. The Reverend María Uitti McCabe is its currently serving minister, and the Society President is Keith Murphy. UUSF is a member congregation of the Boston-based Unitarian Universalist Association, and a designated GLBTQA Welcoming Congregation, a UUA Honor Congregation, and a part of the Green Sanctuary movement. Services are held in the neo-Gothic sanctuary at 10:00 a.m. from September through mid-June each year. The church was added to the National Register of Historic Places in 1996.

The Unitarian Memorial Church in Fairhaven was built, financed and donated to the Unitarians in 1904 by Henry H. Rogers in memory of his mother. The church was designed by Boston architect Charles Brigham in a Gothic Revival style. It is one hundred and fourteen feet (35 m) in height, one hundred feet (30 m) long in body and fifty-three feet (16 m) wide. The nave is thirty-two feet (9.8 m) wide and seventy-one feet (22 m) long. The main aisle is sixty-two feet (19 m) long and six feet (1.8 m) wide. The church, parish house and former parsonage (now Harrop Center) of the Unitarian Society are so placed as to form three sides of a quadrangle. There is a tower over one hundred and sixty-five feet (50 m) high, with eleven bells.

== Organ ==
The organ was built by the Hutchings-Votey Organ Company of Boston, Massachusetts in 1904. With 2,300 pipes (24 ranks) distributed over 3 manuals and pedalboard, it was considered one of the finest organs in the country at the time. When the new hot-air heating system installed in 1968 ruined the Hutchings-Votey pneumatic mechanism, a new organ was built by the Roche Organ Co., of Taunton, Massachusetts, in 1971 as their Opus 10. The Roche Organ Company preserved the exterior casework and the twelve best ranks from the previous organ, increasing the number of ranks to 58, with 3,163 pipes and fifty speaking registers.

The organ occupies the transepts on either side of the chancel and is housed behind the richly carved twin cases of the original instrument, which differ from each other in detail of ornamentation. The console is centrally located in the choir loft behind the pulpit rostrum. The woodwork of the cases, like the rest of the church furnishings, is of English oak. The facade pipes are covered in gold leaf and embellished with elaborate diapering. The basic case design bears a strong resemblance to that of the 1896 organ case in Southwark Cathedral in England (which probably inspired the Fairhaven design), although the Southwark case is not nearly as attractive nor as elaborate.

A digital upgrade of the console was accomplished by Barry Turley in 2008. Today, the organ remains among the finest of its size. All of the ornamental pipes in the two organ cases, one on each side of the chancel, are covered in beaten gold, the color of clouded silver, and are decorated very ornately.

There stained-glass windows by the artist Robert Reid.

== See also ==
- National Register of Historic Places listings in Bristol County, Massachusetts
