= Henry Huttleston Rogers =

American businessman (1840–1909)

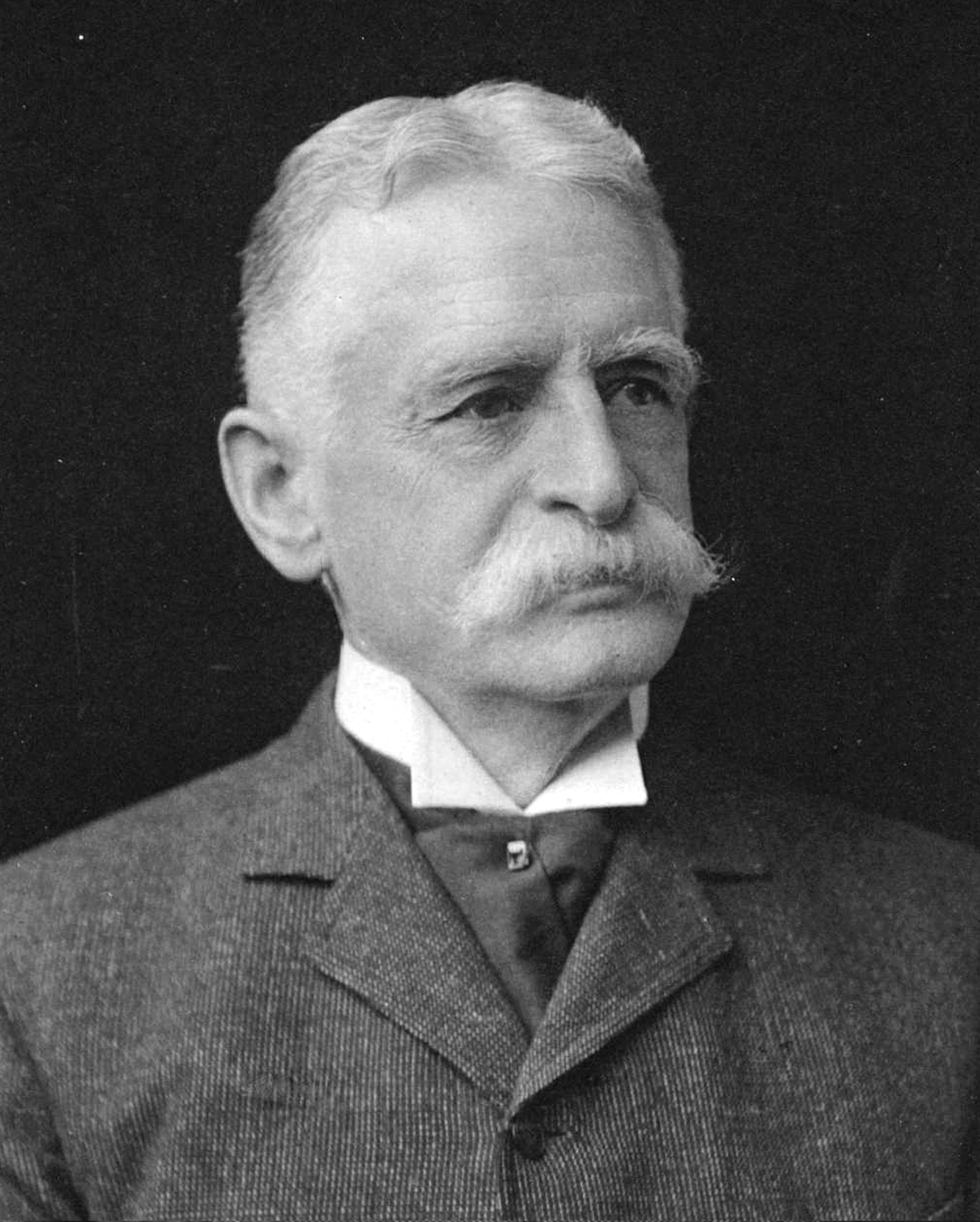
- Rogers, c. 1900
- Born: January 29, 1840; Fairhaven, Massachusetts
- Died: May 19, 1909 (aged 69); New York, New York
- Resting place: Riverside Cemetery in Fairhaven, Massachusetts
- Occupation: Businessman
- Spouses: Abigail Palmer Gifford; Emelie Augusta Randel Hart
- Children: Five, including Mary Huttleston Coe
- Relatives: Mary Millicent Abigail Rogers

Signature
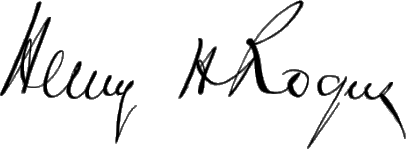

Henry Huttleston Rogers (January 29, 1840 – May 19, 1909) was an American industrialist and financier. He made his fortune in the oil refining business, becoming a leader at Standard Oil. He also played a major role in numerous corporations and business enterprises in the gas industry, copper, and railroads. He became a close friend of Mark Twain.

Rogers' success in the oil industry began with Charles Pratt in 1866, when he invented an improved process by which naphtha was separated from crude oil during oil refining. John D. Rockefeller bought his and Pratt's business in 1874, and Rogers rose rapidly in Standard Oil. He designed the idea of a very long pipeline for transporting oil, as opposed to using railway cars. In the 1880s, he broadened his interests beyond oil to include copper, steel, banking, and railroads, as well as the Consolidated Gas Company that provided coal gas to major cities. By the 1890s, as Rockefeller was withdrawing from the oil business, Rogers was a dominant figure at Standard Oil. In 1899, Rogers set up the Amalgamated Copper trust, based in Butte, Montana, that dominated an industry in high demand as the nation needed wire to build its electric networks. His last major enterprise was building the Virginian Railway to service the West Virginia coal fields. After 1890, he became a prominent philanthropist, as well as a friend and supporter of Mark Twain and Booker T. Washington.

== Early life and education ==
Rogers was born in Fairhaven, Massachusetts, on January 29, 1840. He was the elder son of Rowland Rogers (a former ship captain, bookkeeper and grocer) and his wife, Mary Eldredge Huttleston. Both parents were Yankees and were descended from the Pilgrims who arrived in 1620 aboard the Mayflower. His mother's family had earlier used the spelling "Huddleston" rather than "Huttleston". (Consequently, Rogers' name is often misspelled.)

Except for a brief move to Mattapoisett, Massachusetts, during Rogers' early childhood, the family lived in Fairhaven, a fishing village across the Acushnet River from the whaling port of New Bedford. Fairhaven is a small seaside town on the south coast, bordering the Acushnet River to the west and Buzzards Bay to the south. In the mid-1850s, whaling was already an industry in decline in New England. Whale oil was soon replaced by kerosene and natural gas. Henry Rogers' father was one of the many men of New England who changed from a life on the sea to other work to provide for their families.

Rogers was an average student, and he was in the first graduating class of the local high school in 1856. Continuing to live with his parents, he was hired on with the Fairhaven Branch Railroad, an early precursor of the Old Colony Railroad, as an expressman and brakeman. He worked there for three to four years, while carefully saving his earnings.

== Marriages and family ==
While vacationing in Fairhaven in 1862, Rogers married his childhood sweetheart, Abbie Palmer Gifford, who was also of Mayflower lineage. She returned with him to the oil fields where they lived in a one-room shack along Oil Creek, where her young husband and Ellis worked the Wamsutta Oil Refinery. While they lived in Pennsylvania, their first daughter, Anne Engle Rogers, was born in 1865. They had five surviving children together, four girls and a boy. Another son died at birth.

After the family moved to New York in 1866, Cara Leland Rogers was born in Fairhaven in 1867, Millicent Gifford Rogers was born in 1873, followed by Mary Huttleston Rogers (known as "Mai") in 1875.

Their son, Henry Huttleston Rogers Jr., was born in 1879 and was known as Harry. He lived in New York City and became a colonel in the New York Militia. He served on the Mexican border in 1916, and with the U.S. Army in France from 1917 to 1919 as a lieutenant colonel in the Field Artillery during the First World War. He was also a member of the Rhode Island Society of the Cincinnati.

Abbie Palmer Gifford Rogers died unexpectedly on May 21, 1894. Her childhood home, a two-story, gable-end frame house built in the Greek Revival style, has been preserved. It is made available for tours of Fairhaven, Massachusetts, where she and her husband grew up.

In 1896, Rogers remarried to Emelie Augusta Randel Hart, a divorcée and New York socialite. They had no children.

== Career ==
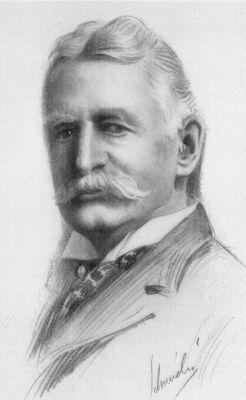
H. H. Rogers

In 1861, 21-year-old Henry pooled his savings of approximately US$600 with a friend, Charles P. Ellis. They set out to western Pennsylvania and its newly discovered oil fields. Borrowing another US$600, the young partners began a small refinery at McClintocksville near Oil City. They named their new enterprise Wamsutta Oil Refinery. Rogers and Ellis and their refinery made US$30,000 during their first year. This amount was more than the earnings of three whaling ship trips during an average voyage of more than a year's duration. When Rogers returned home to Fairhaven for a short vacation the next year, he was greeted as a success.

In Pennsylvania, Rogers was introduced to Charles Pratt (1830–91). Born in Watertown, Massachusetts, Pratt had been one of eleven children. His father, Asa Pratt, was a carpenter. Of modest means, he spent three winters as a student at Wesleyan Academy, and is said to have lived on a dollar a week at times. In nearby Boston, Massachusetts, Pratt joined a company specializing in paints and whale oil products. In 1850 or 1851, he came to New York City, where he worked for a similar company handling paint and oil.

Pratt was a pioneer of the natural oil industry, and established his kerosene refinery Astral Oil Works in the Greenpoint section of Brooklyn, New York. Pratt's product later gave rise to the slogan, "The holy lamps of Tibet are primed with Astral Oil". He also later founded the Pratt Institute.

When Pratt met Rogers at McClintocksville on a business trip, he already knew Charles Ellis, having earlier bought whale oil from him back east in Fairhaven. Although Ellis and Rogers had no wells and were dependent upon purchasing crude oil to refine and sell to Pratt, the two young men agreed to sell the entire output of their small Wamsutta refinery to Pratt's company at a fixed price. This worked well at first. Then, a few months later, crude oil prices suddenly increased due to manipulation by speculators. The young entrepreneurs struggled to try to live up to their contract with Pratt, but soon their surplus was wiped out. Before long, they were heavily in debt to Pratt.

Charles Ellis gave up, but in 1866, Henry Rogers went to Pratt in New York and told him he would take personal responsibility for the entire debt. This so impressed Pratt that he immediately hired him for his own organization.

=== New York, oil refining ===
Pratt made Rogers foreman of his Brooklyn refinery, with a promise of a partnership if sales ran over $50,000 a year. The Rogers' family moved to Brooklyn. Rogers moved steadily from foreman to manager, and then superintendent of Pratt's Astral Oil Refinery. He accomplished and exceeded the substantial sales increase goal which Pratt had set when recruiting him. As promised, Pratt gave Rogers an interest in the business. In 1867, with Henry Rogers as a partner, he established the firm of Charles Pratt and Company. In the next few years, Rogers became, in the words of Elbert Hubbard, Pratt's "hands and feet and eyes and ears" (Little Journeys to the Homes, 1909). As their family grew, Henry and Abbie continued to live in New York City, but vacationed frequently at Fairhaven.

While working with Pratt, Rogers invented an improved way of separating naphtha, a mixture of hydrocarbon compounds produced during the distillation of crude oil, from the oil. He was granted U.S. Patent # 120,539 on October 31, 1871.

==== Fighting Rockefeller ====
In the early 1871–1872, Pratt and Company and other refiners became involved in a conflict with John D. Rockefeller, Samuel Andrews, and Henry M. Flagler (of Rockefeller, Andrews & Flagler, a Cleveland-based refining company) and the South Improvement Company. In developing what would become Standard Oil, Rockefeller, a manager of extraordinary abilities, and Flagler, an exceptional marketer, recognized that the costs and control of the shipment of crude oil would be key elements in competition with other refiners. With its combination of clever market manipulation, and hard-nosed dealings with the powerful Pennsylvania Railroad (PRR), the South Improvement scheme was an example of the type of business tactics which Rockefeller and his associates used to become successful. Although Rockefeller became the target of many who decried Standard Oil's ruthlessness in subsequent years, the South Improvement rebate scheme was Flagler's idea.

South Improvement was basically a mechanism to obtain secret favorable net rates from Tom Scott of the Pennsylvania Railroad (PRR) and other railroads through secret rebates from the common carrier. A "common carrier" is somewhat like a utility, inasmuch as it often has certain rights, powers and monopolies on its services beyond those normally afforded regular business enterprises. A common carrier was expected to serve the public good and treat its customers uniformly. Rates in that era were promulgated and published in what was called "tariffs" and were public information. The rebate scheme was done outside of that process. As an opposite effect, normally afforded "tariffs" were increased and charged to customers not privy to the scheme.

Newspapers were quick to publicize the issue. The injustice of the South Improvement scheme outraged many independent oil producers and owners of refineries. Rogers led the opposition among the New York refiners. The New York interests formed an association, and about the middle of March 1872 sent a committee of three, with Rogers as head, to Oil City to consult with the Oil Producers' Union. Working with the Pennsylvania independents, Rogers and the New York delegation managed to forge an agreement with the railroads, whose leaders eventually agreed to open their rates to all and promised to end their shady dealings with South Improvement.

Rockefeller and his associates quickly started another approach, which frequently included buying up opposing interests. Their dominance of the growing industry and the squeezing out of smaller competitors continued and expanded. But, the South Improvement incident prompted growing public sentiment to support governmental oversight and regulation of large businesses, including the railroads. Congress passed new antitrust laws, the administration created the Interstate Commerce Commission (ICC), and the courts eventually ordered the breakup of the Standard Oil Trust in the early 20th century.

==== Combining forces: joining Standard Oil ====
In 1874, Rockefeller approached Pratt with a plan to cooperate and consolidate their businesses. Pratt discussed it with Rogers, and they decided that the combination would benefit them. Rogers formulated terms, which guaranteed financial security and jobs for Pratt and himself. Rockefeller had apparently learned a lot about Rogers' talents and negotiating skills during the South Improvement conflict. He quietly accepted the offer on the exact terms Rogers had laid out. In this manner, Charles Pratt and Company (including Astral Oil) became one of the important independent refiners to join the Standard Oil Trust.

By this date, Charles Pratt was reaching an age to consider retirement, and he subsequently devoted much of his time and interests to activities such as founding the Pratt Institute. However, Pratt's son, Charles Millard Pratt (1858 to 1913), became Corporate Secretary of Standard Oil. As a part owner of Pratt and Company, Rogers, who was about 35 years old, now owned a share of Standard Oil himself. In the deal, Rockefeller had also added Henry Rogers to his team. He undoubtedly placed a high value on Rogers' potential. History does not tell us if he foresaw that the promising young man was destined to become one of his major partners.

==== Building Standard Oil with John D. Rockefeller ====
Standard Oil was an oil refining conglomerate. Its successors continued to be among the world's biggest corporations over 140 years later. John D. Rockefeller, long regarded as the principal founder, was of a modest background and education. Born in New York in 1839, he moved with his family to Cleveland in 1855. His first job was as an assistant bookkeeper for a produce company. He delighted, as he later recalled, in "all the methods and systems of the office". He became particularly well skilled at calculating transportation costs, a skill which would later serve him well. He worked in variety of small business enterprises during the next few years, owning interests in several.

During this time, Rockefeller became friends with Henry Morrison Flagler. The two men had much in common, as they were both conservative, hard-working, energetic, and driven to make money. Their backgrounds included working separately for a number of years in various retail enterprises, including the grain business. Although they were teetotalers personally, distilled spirits were a byproduct of the handling of corn, and both embraced the business opportunity that they presented; making money was clearly paramount.

In their separate forays into business, financial results for the two had been mixed. Flagler, nine years senior to Rockefeller, had been completely wiped out financially in a venture into salt. Only a loan from a relative, Stephen V. Harkness, allowed him to keep creditors at bay and stay out of total ruin.

In the second half of the 19th century, the United States began a transition from use of whale oil to petroleum for heating and lighting. Discovery of oil fields in western Pennsylvania in the late 1850s and the promise of increased industrial activity and economic growth after the end of the American Civil War combined to make the refining of crude oil seem an attractive business to Rockefeller. He and Flagler enlisted chemist Samuel Andrews and with his brother, William Rockefeller, Jabez Bostwick, and Flagler's relative and silent partner, Stephen V. Harkness, went into the refining business in Cleveland as Rockefeller, Andrews & Flagler.

By all accounts, Rockefeller was an accomplished manager and financial planner, Flagler was an skilled marketer, and Andrews had the know-how to oversee refining aspects. As demand for kerosene and a new byproduct, gasoline, grew in the United States, by 1868, what was to become Standard Oil was the world's largest oil refinery.

In 1870, Rockefeller formed Standard Oil Company of Ohio and started his strategy of buying up the competition and consolidating all oil refining under one company. It was during this period that the Pratt interests and Henry Rogers were brought into the fold. By 1878 Standard Oil held about 90% of the refining capacity in the United States.

Flagler's wife was in failing health due to what was later determined to be tuberculosis. On advice of her physician, he took her to Florida for the winter months beginning in 1877, and she did seem to improve with the gentle winter and cool ocean breezes there. While in Florida, Flagler was struck with the lack of good rail transportation south of Jacksonville, the equally poor availability of good lodging, and the potential the impoverished state held as a vacation destination for northerners. Sensing a major business opportunity, he began to invest and become a major developer of Florida's east coast in what many regard as his "second career." However, his ventures in Florida marked the beginning of his gradual reduction in management participation at Standard Oil.

In 1881 the company was reorganized as the Standard Oil Trust. In 1885, the headquarters were relocated from Cleveland to New York City. By this time, the three main men of Standard Oil Trust had become John D. Rockefeller, his brother William, and Henry Rogers, who had emerged as a key financial strategist. By 1890, Rogers was a vice president of Standard Oil and chairman of the organization's operating committee.

==== Oil and gas pipelines ====
Petroleum pipelines were first developed in Pennsylvania in the 1860s to replace transport in wooden barrels loaded on wagons drawn by mules and driven by teamsters. This mule-drawn transportation was expensive and fraught with difficulties: leaking barrels, muddy trails, wagon breakdowns and mule/driver problems.

The first successful metal pipeline was completed in 1865, when Samuel Van Syckel built a four-mile (6 km) pipeline from Pithole, Pennsylvania, to the nearest railroad. This initial success led to the construction of pipelines to connect crude oil production, increasingly moving west as new fields were discovered and Pennsylvania fields declined, to refineries located near major demand centers in the Northeast. Biographer Z. James Varanini writes, "the completion of these pipelines represented a move towards a new type of interconnectivity of previously isolated states."

When Rockefeller observed this, he began to acquire many of the new pipelines. Soon, his Standard Oil companies owned a majority of the lines, which provided cheap, efficient transportation for oil. Cleveland, Ohio, became a center of the refining industry principally because of its transportation systems.

Rogers conceived the idea of long pipelines for transporting oil and natural gas. In 1881, the National Transit Company was formed by Standard Oil to own and operate Standard's pipelines. The National Transit Company remained one of Rogers' favorite projects throughout the rest of his life.

East Ohio Gas Company (EOG) was incorporated on September 8, 1898, as a marketing company for the National Transit Company, the natural gas arm of Standard Oil Company of New Jersey. The company launched its business by selling to consumers in northeast Ohio gas produced by another National Transit subsidiary, Hope Natural Gas Company.

Rubber-manufacturing city Akron, Ohio, was the first to take advantage of the lower prices for natural gas. It granted the East Ohio Gas Company a franchise in September 1898, the same month that the company was founded. During the winter of 1898–99, the National Transit Company built a 10-inch wrought iron pipeline that stretched from the Pipe Creek on the Ohio River to Akron, with branches to Canton, Massillon, Dover, New Philadelphia, Uhrichsville, and Dennison. The first gas from the pipeline burned in Akron on May 10, 1899.

==== Steel ====
Andrew Carnegie, long the leading steel magnate of Pittsburgh, retired at the turn of the 20th century, and refocused his interests on philanthropy. His steel holdings were consolidated into the new United States Steel Corporation. Standard Oil's interest in steel properties led to Rogers becoming one of the directors when it was organized in 1901.

==== Regulating Standard Oil ====
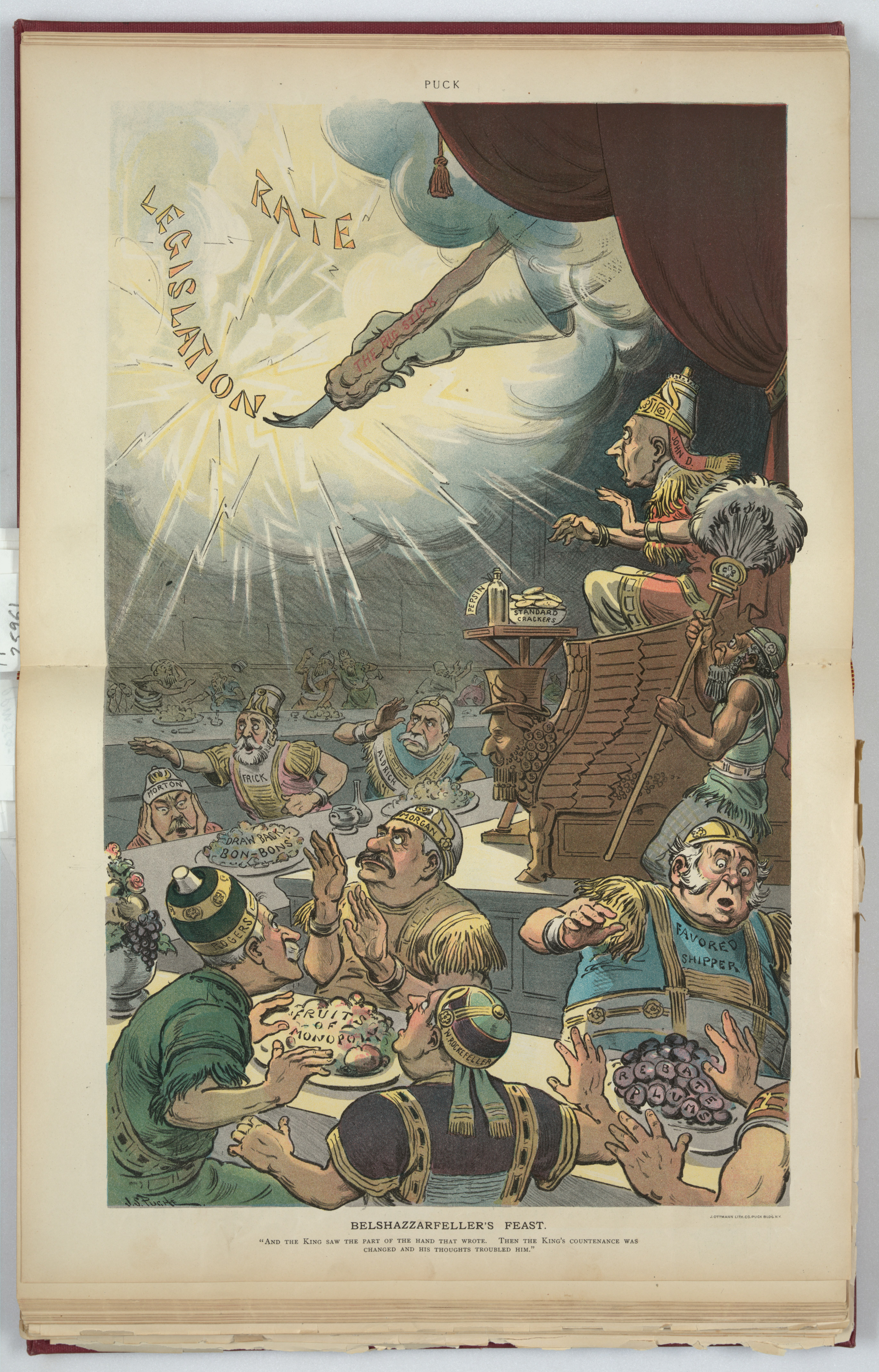
The threat of Congressional rate regulation frightens monopolists like John D Rockefeller (on throne) and Rogers (lower left), Cartoon by J. S. Pughe in Puck 1905.

In 1890 the U.S. Congress passed the Sherman Antitrust Act. This act is the source of all American anti-monopoly laws. The law forbids every contract, scheme, deal, conspiracy to restrain trade. It also forbids inspirations to secure monopoly of a given industry. The Standard Oil Trust attracted attention from antitrust authorities. The Ohio Attorney General filed and won an antitrust suit in 1892.

Ida M. Tarbell, an American author and journalist, who was known as one of the leading muckrakers, criticized Standard Oil practices. Tarbell met Rogers, by then the most senior and powerful director of Standard Oil, through his friend, Mark Twain. They began to meet in January 1902 and continued for the next two years. As Tarbell brought up case histories, Rogers provided an explanation, documents and figures concerning the case. Rogers may have believed Tarbell intended a complimentary work, as he was apparently candid. Her interviews with him were the basis of her negative exposé of Standard Oil's questionable business practices. Tarbell's investigations of Standard Oil for McClure's, ran in 19 parts from November 1902 to October 1904. They were collected and published as The History of the Standard Oil Company in 1904.

Although public opposition to Rockefeller and Standard Oil existed prior to Tarbell's investigation, there had been general opposition to Standard Oil and trusts. Her book is widely credited with hastening the 1911 breakup of Standard Oil by the United States Supreme Court. "They had never played fair, and that ruined their greatness for me", Tarbell wrote about the company.

Tarbell blasted Standard Oil for dubious business practices, including subduing competitors and engaging in illegal transportation deals with the railroad companies to undercut competitors' prices.

=== Natural gas ===
Rogers joined in the organization of holding companies aimed at controlling natural gas production and distribution. In 1884, with associates, Rogers formed the Consolidated Gas Company, and thereafter for several years he was instrumental in gaining control of great city plants, fighting terrific battles with rivals for some of them, as in the case of Boston. Almost the whole story of his natural gas interests was one of business warfare.

=== Copper ===
During the 1890s, Rogers became interested in Anaconda and other copper properties in the western United States. In 1899, with William Rockefeller, and Thomas W. Lawson, he formed the first $75,000,000 section of the gigantic trust, Amalgamated Copper Mining Company, which was the subject of much acrid criticism then and for years afterward. In the building of this great trust, some of the most ruthless strokes in modern business history were dealt: the $38,000,000 "watering" of the stock of the first corporation, its subsequent manipulation, the seizure of the copper property of the Butte & Boston Consolidated Mining Company, the using of the latter as a weapon against the Boston & Montana Consolidated Copper and Silver Mining Company, the guerrilla warfare against certain private interests, and the wrecking of the Globe Bank of Boston.

A holding company aimed at controlling copper production and distribution, Amalgamated Copper controlled the copper mines of Butte, Montana and later became Anaconda Copper Company, a revert to its original name.

=== Transit: Staten Island ===
On July 1, 1892, Staten Island, New York's first trolley line opened, running between Port Richmond and Meiers Corners. Trolleys, which cost only a nickel a ride through most of their existence, help facilitate mass transit across the Island by reaching communities not serviced by trains. Henry H. Rogers was long-known as the Staten Island transit magnate, and was also involved with the Staten Island-Manhattan Ferry Service and the Richmond Power and Light Company.

=== Railroads ===
Rogers was also close associate of E. H. Harriman in the latter's extensive railroad operations. He was a director of the Santa Fe, St. Paul, Erie, Lackawanna, Union Pacific, and several other large railroads. However, he also involved himself in at least three West Virginia short-line railroad projects, one of which would grow much larger than he probably anticipated.

==== Ohio River Railroad ====
In mid-1890s, Rogers became president of the Ohio River Railroad, founded by Johnson Newlon Camden, a United States senator from West Virginia who was also secretly involved with Standard Oil. Charles M. Pratt and Rogers were two of the largest owners and the Ohio River Railroad's General Manager was C.M. Burt. Its General Solicitor was former West Virginia governor William A. MacCorkle. The owners wished to sell the railroad, which was losing money.

Under Rogers' leadership, they formed a subsidiary, West Virginia Short Line Railroad, to build a new line between New Martinsville and Clarksburg to reach new coal mining areas, into territory already planned for expansion by the Baltimore and Ohio Railroad (B&O). The expansion plans had the desired effect of essentially forcing B&O to purchase the Ohio River Railroad to block the competition in the new coal areas. The Ohio River Railroad was sold to B&O in 1898.

==== Kanawha and Pocahontas Railroad Company ====
The Kanawha and Pocahontas Railroad Company was incorporated in West Virginia in 1898 by either a son of Charles Pratt or the estate of Charles Pratt. Its line ran 15 miles (24 km) from the Kanawha River up a tributary called Paint Creek. Once again, new coal mining territory was involved. Rogers, acting on behalf of Charles Pratt and Company negotiated its lease to the Chesapeake and Ohio Railway (C&O) in 1901 and its sale to a newly formed C&O subsidiary, Kanawha and Paint Creek Railway Company, in 1902. (I have never seen any documentation that involves Rogers in this railroad, and comments by Gov. MacCorkle in his book suggest that Rogers was not involved with this deal.) TWS

==== Virginian Railway ====
His final achievement, working with consulting engineer William Nelson Page, was the building of the Virginian Railway (VGN), which eventually extended 600 miles (970 km) from the coal fields of southern West Virginia to port near Norfolk at Sewell's Point, Virginia in the harbor of Hampton Roads.

Initially, Rogers' involvement in the project began in 1902 with Page's Deepwater Railway, planned as an 80-mile (130 km) short line to reach untapped coal reserves in a very rugged portion of southern West Virginia, and interchange its traffic with the C&O and/or the N&W. Some speculate that the Deepwater Railway was probably intended for resale in the manner of the earlier two West Virginia short lines. However, if so, the ploy was foiled by collusion of the bigger railroads, who were both controlled by the Pennsylvania Railroad and agreed with each other to neither purchase it or grant favorable interchange rates.

Page was the "front man" for the Deepwater project, and it is likely the leaders of the big railroads were unaware that their foe was backed by the wealthy Rogers, who did not give up a good fight easily. Instead of abandoning the project, Page and Rogers secretly developed a plan to extend their new railroad all the way across West Virginia and Virginia to port at Hampton Roads. They modified the Deepwater Railway charter to reach the Virginia-state line. A Rogers coal property attorney in Staunton, Virginia formed another intrastate railroad in Virginia, the Tidewater Railway.

The battle for the Tidewater Railway's rights-of-way displayed Rogers at his most crafty and ingenious. He was able to persuade the leading citizens of Roanoke and Norfolk, both strongholds of the rival Norfolk and Western, that his new railroad would be a boon to both communities, secretly securing crucial rights-of-way in the process. In 1907, the name of the Tidewater Railway was changed to The Virginian Railway Company, and it acquired the Deepwater Railway to form the needed West Virginia-Virginia link.

Financed almost entirely from Rogers' own resources, and completed in 1909, instead of interchanging, the new Virginian Railway competed with the much larger Chesapeake and Ohio Railway and Norfolk and Western Railway for coal traffic. Built following his policy of investing in the best route and equipment on initial selection and purchase to save operating expenses, the VGN enjoyed a more modern pathway built to the highest standards, and provided major competition to its larger neighboring railroads, each of whom tried several times unsuccessfully to acquire it after they realized it could not be blocked from completion.

However, the time and enormous effort Rogers expended on the project continued to undermine his already declining health, not only because of his Herculean work but also because of the uncertain economy of the period, exacerbated by the financial Panic of 1907 which began in March of that year. To obtain the needed financing, he was forced to pour many of his own assets into the railroad. Management of the funding Rogers was providing was handled by Boston financier Godfrey M. Hyams, with whom he had also worked on the Anaconda Company, and many other natural resource projects.

On July 22, 1907, he suffered a debilitating stroke. Over a period of about five months, he gradually recovered. In 1908, he put the remaining financing in place needed to see his railroad to completion. When completed the following year, the Virginian Railway was called by the newspapers "the biggest little railway in the world" and proved both viable and profitable.

Many historians consider the Virginian Railway to be one of Henry Rogers' greatest legacies. The 600-mile (970 km) Virginian Railway (VGN) followed his philosophy regarding investing in the best equipment and paying its employees and vendors well throughout its profitable history. It operated some of the largest and most powerful steam, electric, and diesel locomotives throughout its 50-year history. Chronicled by rail historian and rail photographer H. Reid in The Virginian Railway (Kalmbach, 1961), the VGN gained a following of railway enthusiasts which continues to the present day.

The VGN was merged into the Norfolk & Western in 1959. However, almost all of the former VGN mainline trackage in West Virginia and about 50% of that in Virginia is still in use in 2006 as the preferred route for eastbound coal trains for Norfolk Southern Corporation due to the more favorable gradients while crossing the Allegheny Mountains' continental divide and the Blue Ridge Mountains east of Roanoke, while most westbound traffic of empty coal cars uses the original Norfolk and Western main line.

=== Banking and trading ===
When the newly formed Mutual Alliance Trust Company opened for business in New York on the Tuesday after June 29, 1902, there were 13 directors, including Emanuel Lehman, William Rockefeller, Cornelius Vanderbilt, and Rogers.

By 1907, Rogers was a member of the Consolidated Stock Exchange of New York, one of around 13,000.

== Business summary: "Hell Hound" ==
Rogers was an energetic man, and exhibited ruthlessness, and iron determination. In the financial and business world he could be grasping and greedy, and operated under a flexible moral code that often stretched the rules of both honesty and fair play. On Wall Street in New York City, he became known as "Hell Hound Rogers" and "The Brains of the Standard Oil Trust." He was considered one of the last and great "robber barons" of his day, as times were changing. Nevertheless, Rogers amassed a great fortune, estimated at over $100 million. He invested heavily in various industries, including copper, steel, mining, and railways.

Much of what we know about Rogers and his style in business dealings was recorded by others. His behavior in public Court Proceedings provide some of the better examples and some insight. Rogers' business style extended to his testimony in many court settings. Before the Hepburn Committee of 1879, investigating the railroads of New York, he fine-tuned his circumlocutory, ambiguous, and haughty responses. His most intractable performance was later in a 1906 lawsuit by the state of Missouri, which claimed that two companies in that state registered as independents were actually subsidiaries of Standard Oil, a secret ownership Rogers finally acknowledged.

In Marquis Who's Who for 1908, Rogers listed more than twenty corporations of which he was either president and director or vice president and director.

At his death he held assets later estimated to be worth $100 million, but a 2012 critical examination of his wealth considers $41,000,000 (equivalent to $1,469,000,000 in 2025) a closer estimate.

== Philanthropy in Fairhaven ==
Rogers was a modest man, and some of his generosity became known only after his death. Examples are found in writings by Helen Keller, Mark Twain, and Booker T. Washington. Beginning in 1885, he began to donate buildings to his hometown of Fairhaven, Massachusetts. These included a grammar school, Rogers School, built in 1885. The Millicent Library was completed in 1893 and was a gift to the Town by the Rogers children in memory of their sister Millicent, who had died in 1890 at the age of 17.

Abbie Palmer (née Gifford) Rogers presented the new Town Hall in 1894. The George H. Taber Masonic Lodge building, named for Rogers' "uncle" and boyhood mentor, was completed in 1901. The Unitarian Memorial Church was dedicated in 1904 to the memory of Rogers' mother, Mary Huttleston (née Eldredge) Rogers. He had the Tabitha Inn built in 1905, and a new Fairhaven High School, called "Castle on the Hill," was completed in 1906. Rogers funded the draining of the mill pond to create a park, installed the town's public water and sewer systems, and served as superintendent of streets for his hometown. Years later, Henry H. Rogers' daughter, Cara Leland Rogers Broughton (Lady Fairhaven), purchased the site of Fort Phoenix, and donated it to the Town of Fairhaven in her father's memory.

After Abbie's death, Rogers developed close friendships with two other notable Americans: Mark Twain and Booker T. Washington. He was instrumental in the education of Helen Keller. Urged on by Twain, Rogers and his second wife financed her college education.

In 1899, Rogers had a luxury steam yacht built by a shipyard in the Bronx. The Kanawha, at 471-tons, was 200 feet (61 m) long and manned by a crew of 39. For the final ten years of his life, Rogers entertained friends as they sailed on cruises mostly along the East Coast of the United States, north to Maine and Canada, and south to Virginia. With Mark Twain among his frequent guests, the movements of the Kanawha attracted great attention from the newspapers, the major public media of the era.

== Death ==
Funeral and resting place

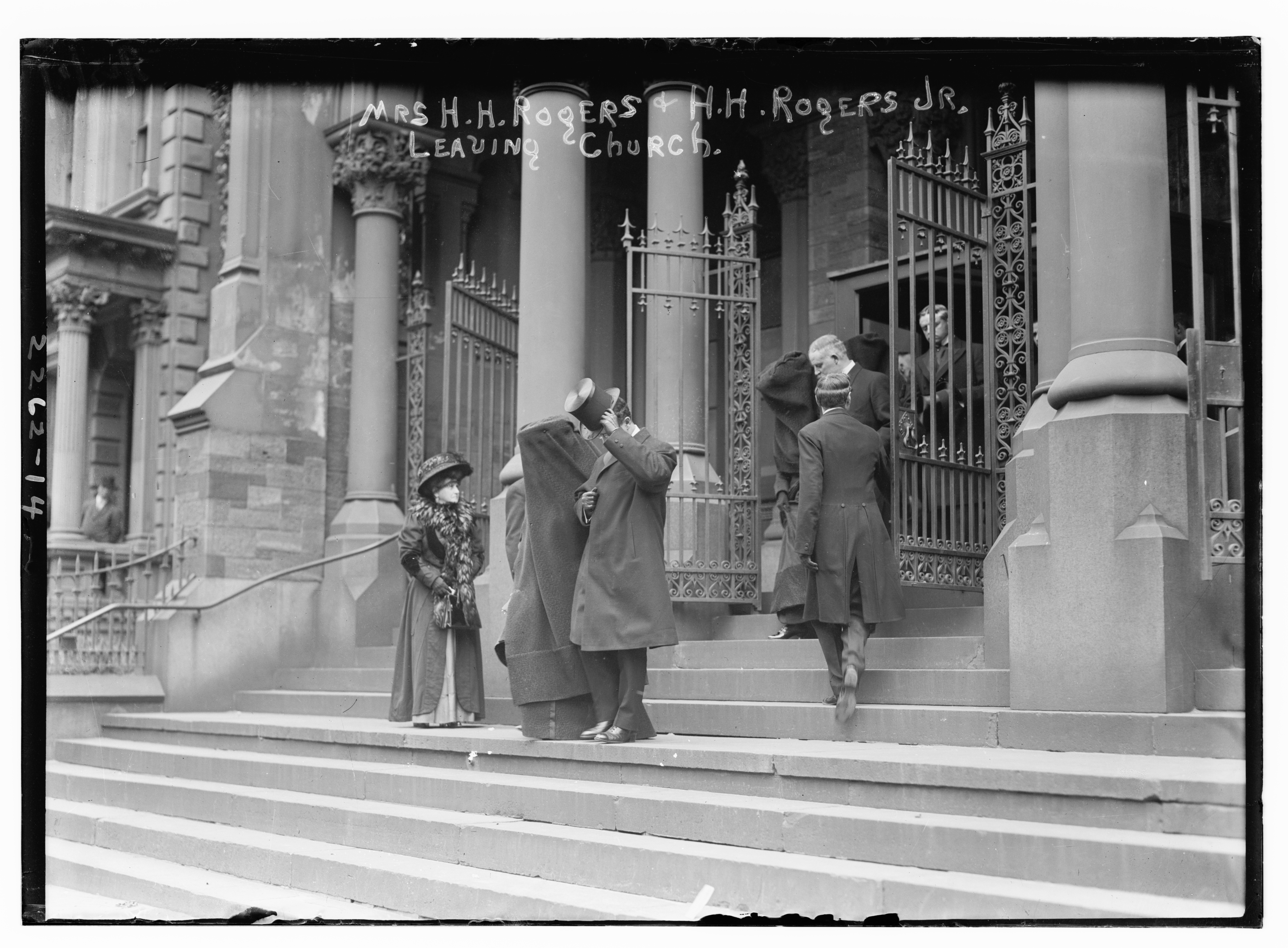
Funeral at the Church of the Messiah

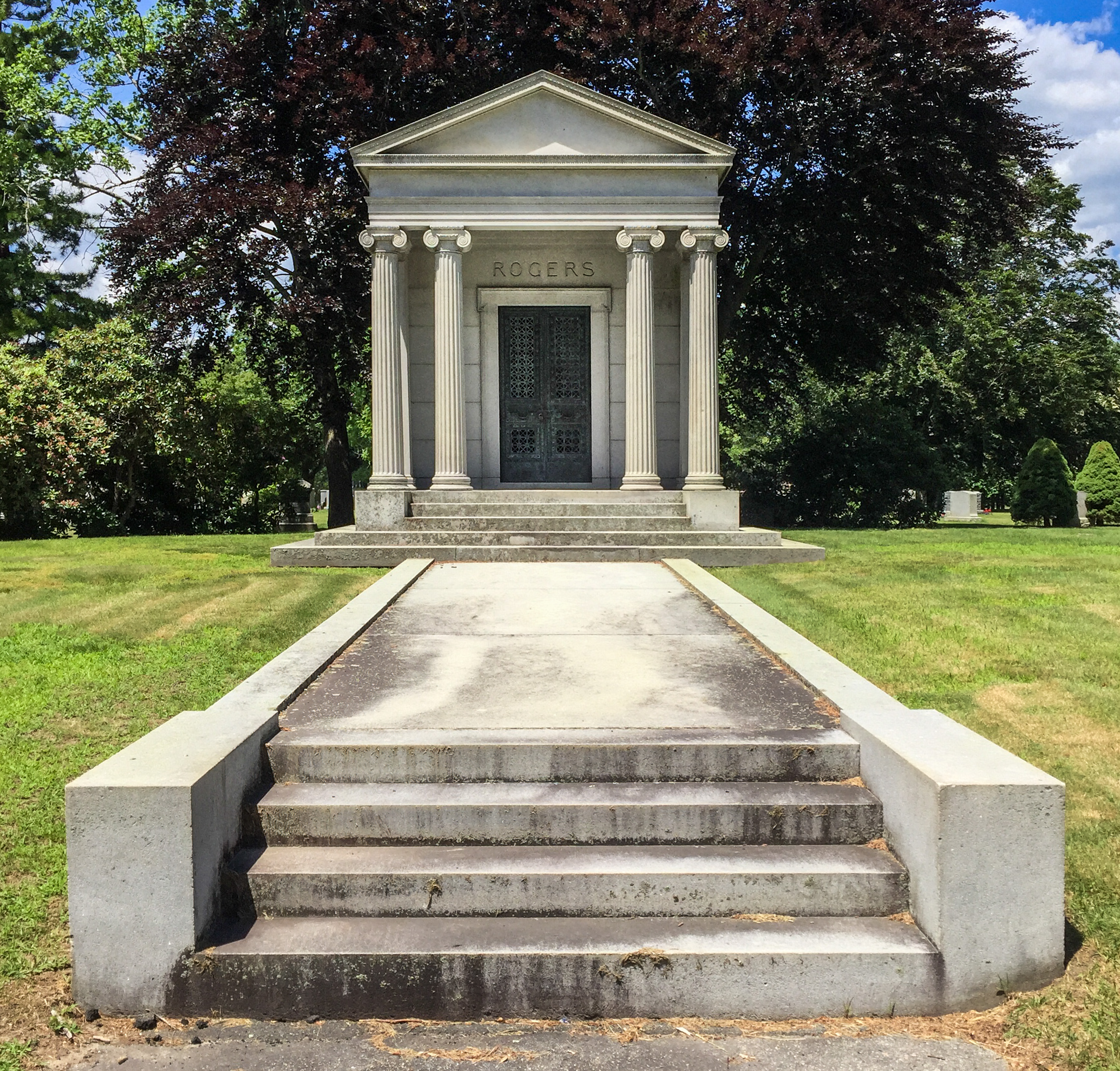
The Rogers mausoleum in Riverside Cemetery

On May 19, 1909, Rogers died suddenly of a stroke. It was less than six weeks before full operations were scheduled to begin on his Virginian Railway. After a funeral at the Church of the Messiah in Manhattan, his body was transported to Fairhaven by a New York, New Haven and Hartford Railroad train. He was interred beside Abbie in Fairhaven's Riverside Cemetery in a mausoleum designed by Charles Brigham after an Ancient Greek temple to Minerva.

== Friendships and philanthropy ==
=== Mark Twain ===
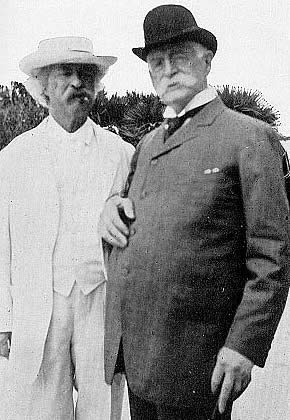
Mark Twain and Henry Huttleston Rogers in 1908

In 1893, a mutual friend introduced Rogers to humorist Mark Twain. Rogers reorganized Twain's tangled finances, and the two became close friends for the rest of Rogers' life. By the 1890s, Twain's fortunes began to decline; in his later life, Twain suffered from depression. He lost three of his four children, and his wife, Olivia Langdon, before his death in 1910.

Twain had some very bad times with his businesses. His publishing company ended up going bankrupt, and he lost thousands of dollars on a typesetting machine that was never quite perfected for commercial use. He also lost a great deal of revenue on royalties from his books being plagiarized before he had a chance to publish them himself.

Rogers and Twain enjoyed a more than 16-year friendship. Rogers' family became Twain's surrogate family, and he was a frequent guest at the Rogers townhouse in New York City. Earl J. Dias described the relationship in these words: "Rogers and Twain were kindred spirits—fond of poker, billiards, the theater, practical jokes, mild profanity, the good-natured spoof. Their friendship, in short, was based on a community of interests and on the fact that each, in some way, needed the other." Their letters were published as Mark Twain's Correspondence with Henry Huttleston Rogers, 1893–1909, They had a standing joke that Twain was inclined to pilfer items from the Rogers household whenever he spent the night there as a guest. Two letters provide an illustration. Twain wrote to Anne Rogers that he had packed:

some articles that was laying around...two books, Mr. Rogers' brown slippers, and a ham. I thought it was one of ourn. It looked like one we used to have, but it shan't occur again, and don't you worry. He will temper the wind to the shorn lamb, and I will send some of the things back if there is some that won't keep. Yores in Jesus, S.L.C.

Rogers responded on October 31, 1906, with the following:

Before I forget it, let me remind you that I shall want the trunk and the things you took away from my house as soon as possible. I learn that instead of taking old things, you took my best. Mrs. Rogers is at the White Mountains. I am going to Fairhaven this afternoon. I hope you will not be there. By the way, I have been using a pair of your gloves in the Mountains, and they don't seem to be much of an attraction.

In April 1907, they traveled together on the Kanawha to the Jamestown Exposition in celebration of the 300th anniversary of the founding of the Jamestown Colony. Twain returned to Norfolk, Virginia with Rogers in April 1909, and was the guest speaker at the dedication dinner held for the newly completed Virginian Railway, a "Mountains to Sea" engineering marvel of the day. The construction of the new railroad had been solely financed by industrialist Rogers.

=== Helen Keller's education ===
In May 1896, at the home in New York City of editor-essayist Laurence Hutton, Rogers and Mark Twain first saw Helen Keller, then sixteen years old. Although she had been made blind and deaf by illness as a young child, she had been reached by her teacher-companion, Anne Sullivan. When she was 20, Keller passed with distinction the entrance examination to Radcliffe College. Twain praised "this marvelous child" and hoped that Helen would not be forced to retire from her studies because of poverty. He urged the Rogerses to aid Keller and to solicit other Standard Oil chiefs to help her. Rogers helped pay for her education at Radcliffe and arranged a monthly stipend.

Keller dedicated her book, The World I Live In, "To Henry H. Rogers, my Dear Friend of Many Years." On the fly leaf of Rogers's copy, she wrote:
To Mrs Rogers The best of the world I live in is the kindness of friends like you and Mr Rogers

=== Booker T. Washington ===
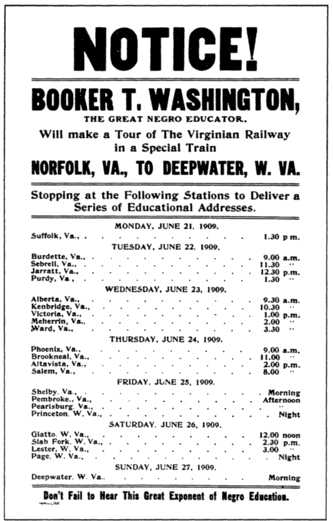
Handbill from 1909 tour of southern Virginia and West Virginia

Around 1894, Rogers attended one of Booker T. Washington's speeches at Madison Square Garden in New York City. The next day, Rogers contacted the educator and invited him to his offices. They had common ground in relatively humble beginnings and became strong friends. Washington became a frequent visitor to Rogers' office, his 85-room mansion in Fairhaven, and the yacht.

Although Rogers had died suddenly a few weeks earlier, in June 1909 Dr. Washington went on a previously arranged speaking tour along the newly completed Virginian Railway. He rode in Rogers' personal rail car, Dixie, making speeches at many locations over a seven-day period. Washington said Rogers had urged the trip to explore how to improve race relations and economic conditions for African Americans along the route of the new railway. It connected many previously isolated rural communities in the southern portions of Virginia and West Virginia.

Washington told about Rogers' philanthropy: "funding the operation of at least 65 small country schools for the education and betterment of African Americans in Virginia and other portions of the South, all unknown to the recipients." Rogers had also generously provided support to Tuskegee Institute and Hampton Institute. Rogers supported projects with at least partial matching funds, in order to achieve more work, and to ensure recipients were also stakeholders.

== Legacy ==
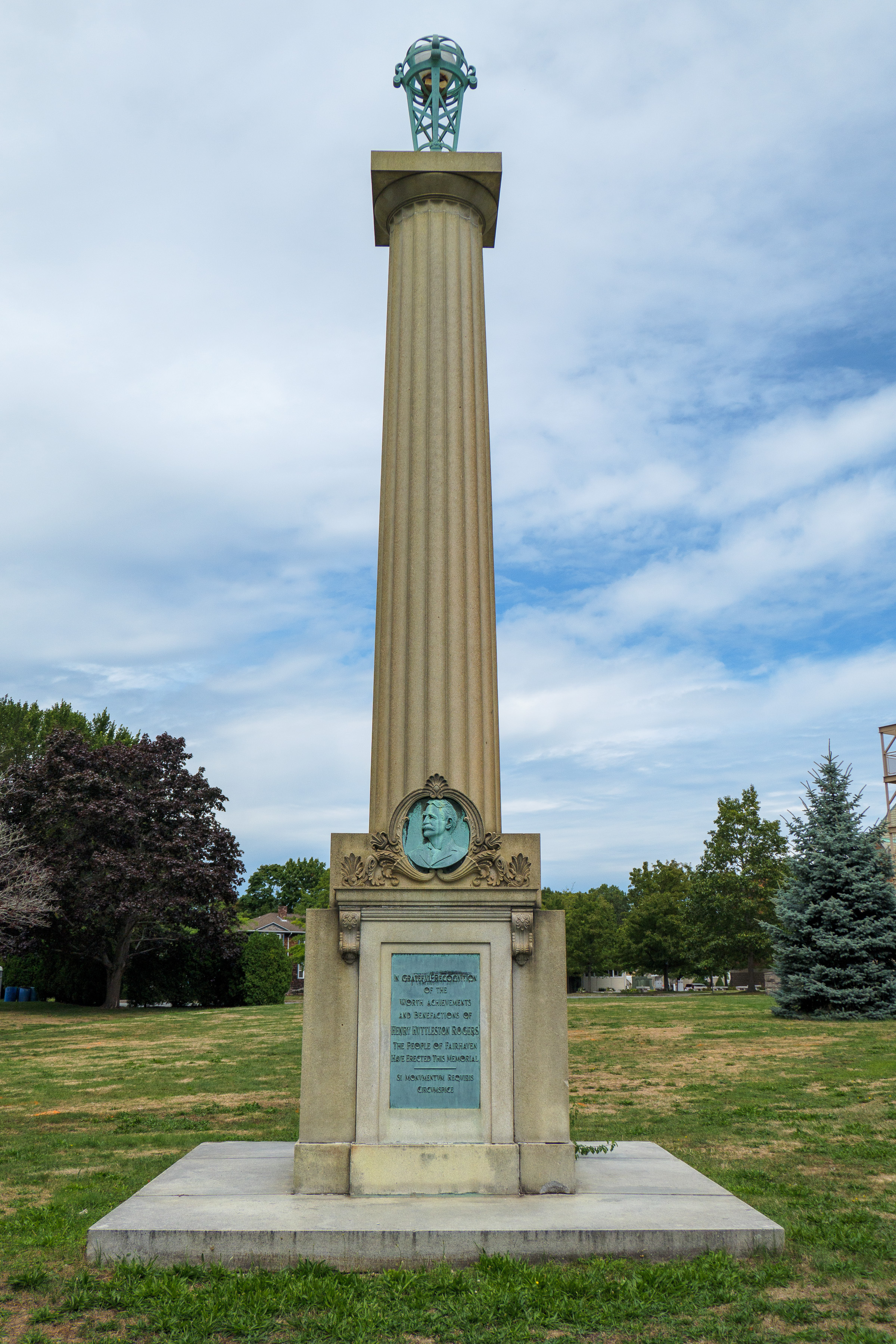
A granite memorial to Rogers on the Fairhaven High School lawn

In Fairhaven, the Rogers family gifts are located throughout the town. These include many buildings designed by the architect Charles Brigham such as Rogers School, Town Hall, Millicent Library, Unitarian Memorial Church, and Fairhaven High School. A granite shaft on the High School lawn is dedicated to Rogers. In Riverside Cemetery, the Henry Huttleston Rogers Mausoleum is patterned after the Temple of Minerva in Athens, Greece. Henry, his first wife Abbie, and several family members are interred there.

In 1916, Newport News Shipbuilding and Dry Dock Company launched the SS H.H. Rogers, a Pratt-class tanker of 8,807 tons with a capacity of 119,390 barrels (18,981 m^{3}) of oil. It was operated by Panama Transport Co., a subsidiary of Standard Oil of New Jersey. During World War II, on February 21, 1943, it was torpedoed and sunk by a German U-boat in the North Atlantic Ocean 600 miles (970 km) off the coast of Ireland while en route from Liverpool, England to the United States. All 73 persons aboard were saved.

In Virginia and West Virginia, former employees, area residents, and enthusiasts of the Virginian Railway consider the entire railroad to have been a memorial to him. Almost 50 years after it was merged into a competitor, Rogers' railroad has a remarkable following. One of the most active Yahoo! railway enthusiasts groups has more than 800 members. A passenger station has been restored in Suffolk, Virginia, a replica built and museum established in Princeton, West Virginia, and work is underway on a larger former VGN station in Roanoke.

In 2004, volunteers engraved Rogers' initials (and those of VGN co-founder William Nelson Page) into new rail laid in Victoria, Virginia. It carries a VGN Class 10-A caboose, built by the company and restored by members of the National Railway Historical Society (NRHS) chapter in Roanoke. Fully equipped, it offers an interpretive display of the business conducted in a caboose along the historic right-of-way.

== See also ==
- National Transit Building
- William N. Page
- Julius Rosenwald
- South Improvement Company
