= Robert Reid (American painter) =

American artist (1862–1929)

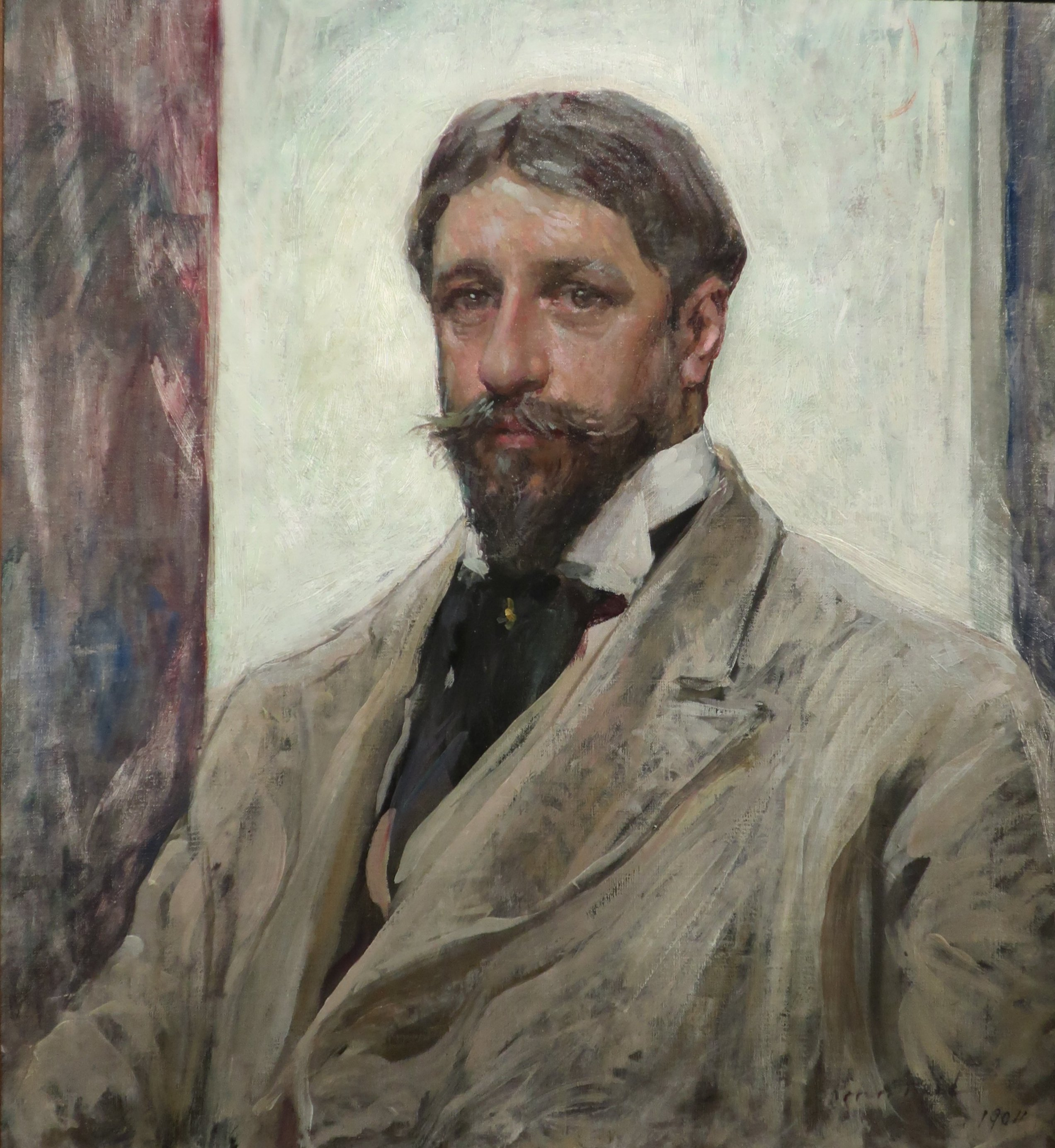
- Self-Portrait, 1904, National Academy of Design
- Born: Robert Lewis Reid; July 29, 1862; Stockbridge, Massachusetts
- Died: December 2, 1929 (aged 67); Clifton Springs, New York
- Resting place: Stockbridge Cemetery; Stockbridge, Massachusetts; 42.285354°N 73.318018°W

Robert Lewis Reid (July 29, 1862 – December 2, 1929) was an American Impressionist painter and muralist. His work tended to be very decorative, much of it centered on depiction of young women set among flowers. He later became known for his murals and designs in stained glass.

== Life and work ==
Robert Reid was born in Stockbridge, Massachusetts and schooled at the Philips Academy from 1880 to 1884. He studied at the School of the Museum of Fine Arts, Boston under Otto Grundmann, where he was later an instructor. In 1884 he moved to New York City, studying at the Art Students League, and in 1885 he went to Paris to study at the Académie Julian under Gustave Boulanger and Jules Joseph Lefebvre. His early pictures were figures of French peasants, painted at Étaples.

Upon returning to New York in 1889, he worked as a portraitist and later became an instructor at the Art Students League and Cooper Union.

=== Paintings ===
He painted three murals for the Manufactures Building at the 1893 World's Columbian Exposition in Chicago, and exhibited four paintings in its Fine Arts Building. His work, including the tragic Her First Born (1888), was awarded a medal for excellence.

Reid was a member of the Ten American Painters, who seceded from the Society of American Artists in 1897. His painting Dawn was awarded the 1898 First Hallgarten Prize by the National Academy of Design.

From 1898 to 1899 Robert Reid's work, his impressionist nude Opal, was picked and exhibited by the Western Art Association Academy. This was for a wider exhibition of the Trans Mississippi art collection, his work was shown at the Omaha Public Library.

Reid worked on several mural projects around the turn of the century. When he returned to paintings, around 1905, his work was more naturalistic, and his palette tended toward soft pastels.

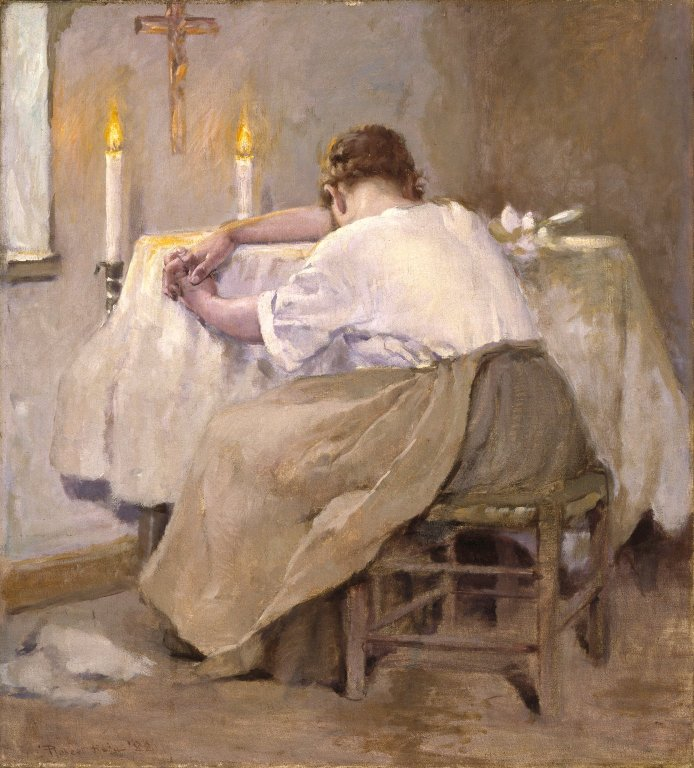
Her First Born (1888), Brooklyn Museum

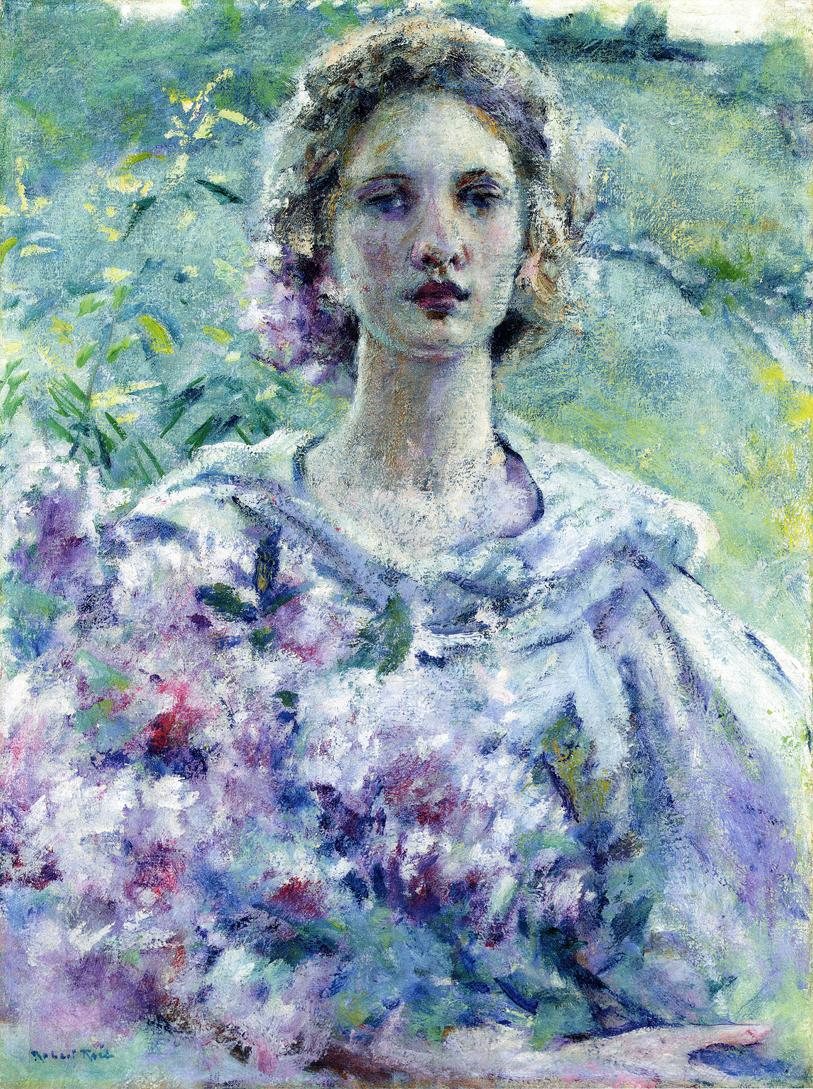
Girl with Flowers

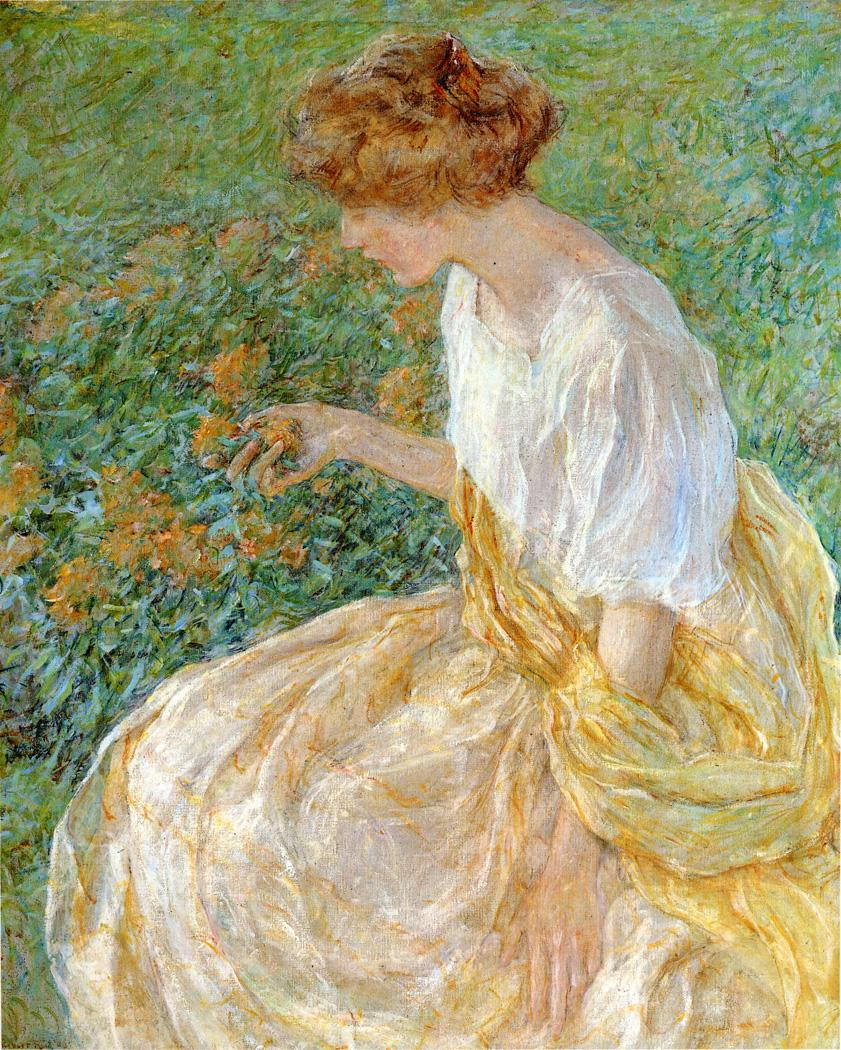
The Yellow Flower aka The Artist's Wife in the Garden (1908)

=== Murals ===
Reid's murals are in the Library of Congress in Washington, D.C., and the Appellate Court House in New York City. The Rotunda of the Massachusetts State House in Boston contains his three large mural panels—James Otis Delivering his Speech against the Writs of Assistance, Paul Revere's Ride, and The Boston Tea Party. He executed a mural panel for the American Pavilion at the 1900 Exposition Universelle in Paris.

His murals for the Palace of Fine Arts building at the Panama–Pacific International Exposition (San Francisco, 1915) were an extraordinary tribute to the Arts. Eight huge panels graced the ceiling of the rotunda: The Four Golds of California (Golden Metal, Wheat, Citrus Fruits, and Poppies); plus Ideals in Art, Inspirations of All Arts, the Birth of European Art and Birth of Oriental Art. These paintings no longer exist in San Francisco's Palace of Fine Arts, which was re-built in the 1960s, and their current whereabouts are unknown.

The Five Senses (ceiling mural), Thomas Jefferson Building, Library of Congress

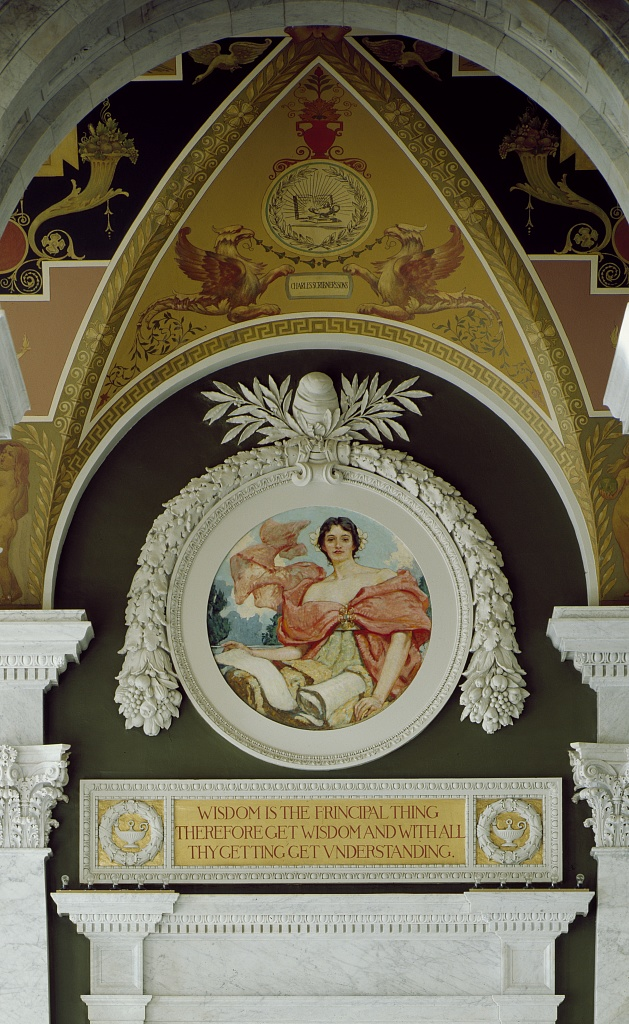
Wisdom (1896), Thomas Jefferson Building, Library of Congress

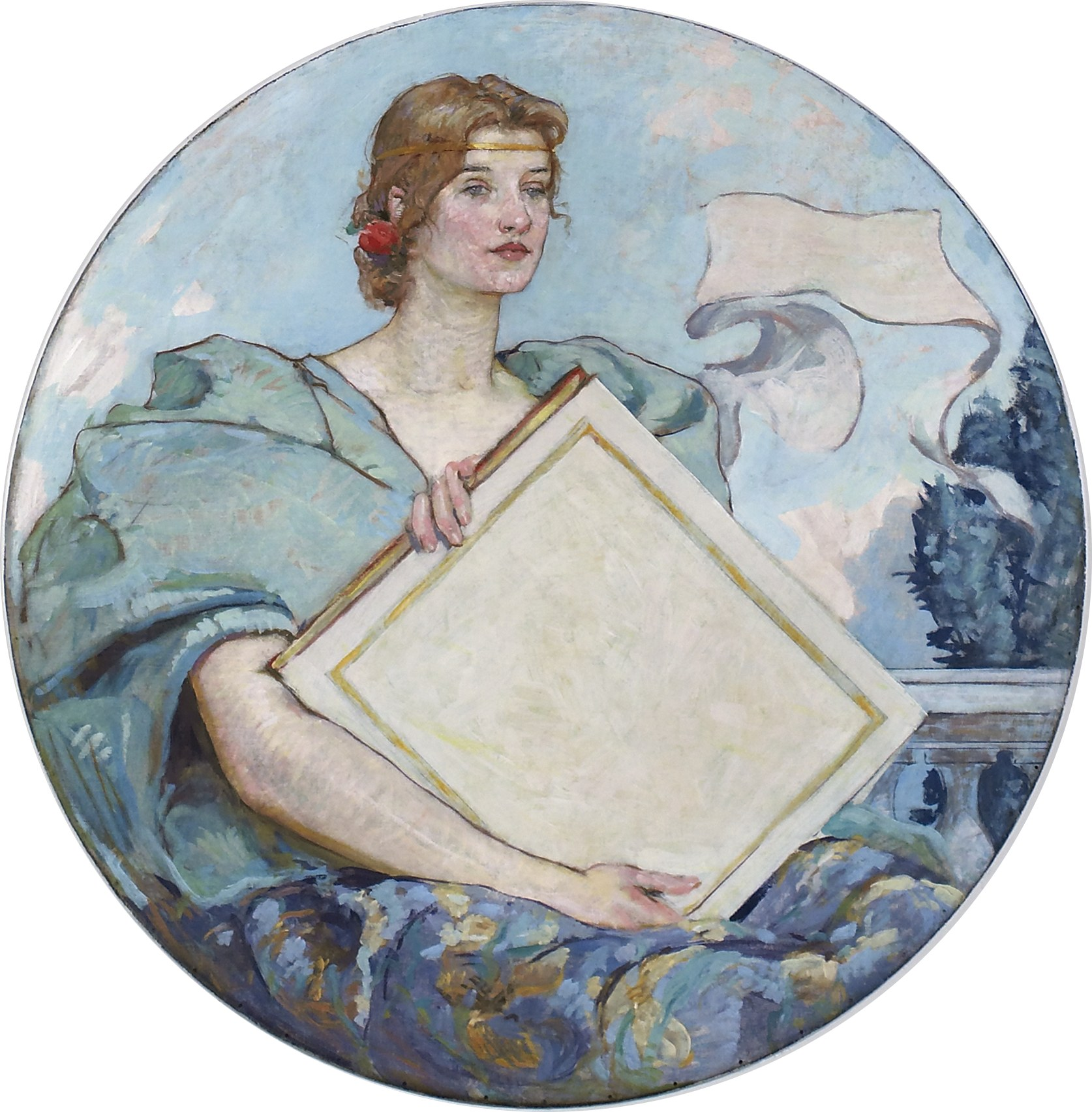
Knowledge (1896), Thomas Jefferson Building, Library of Congress

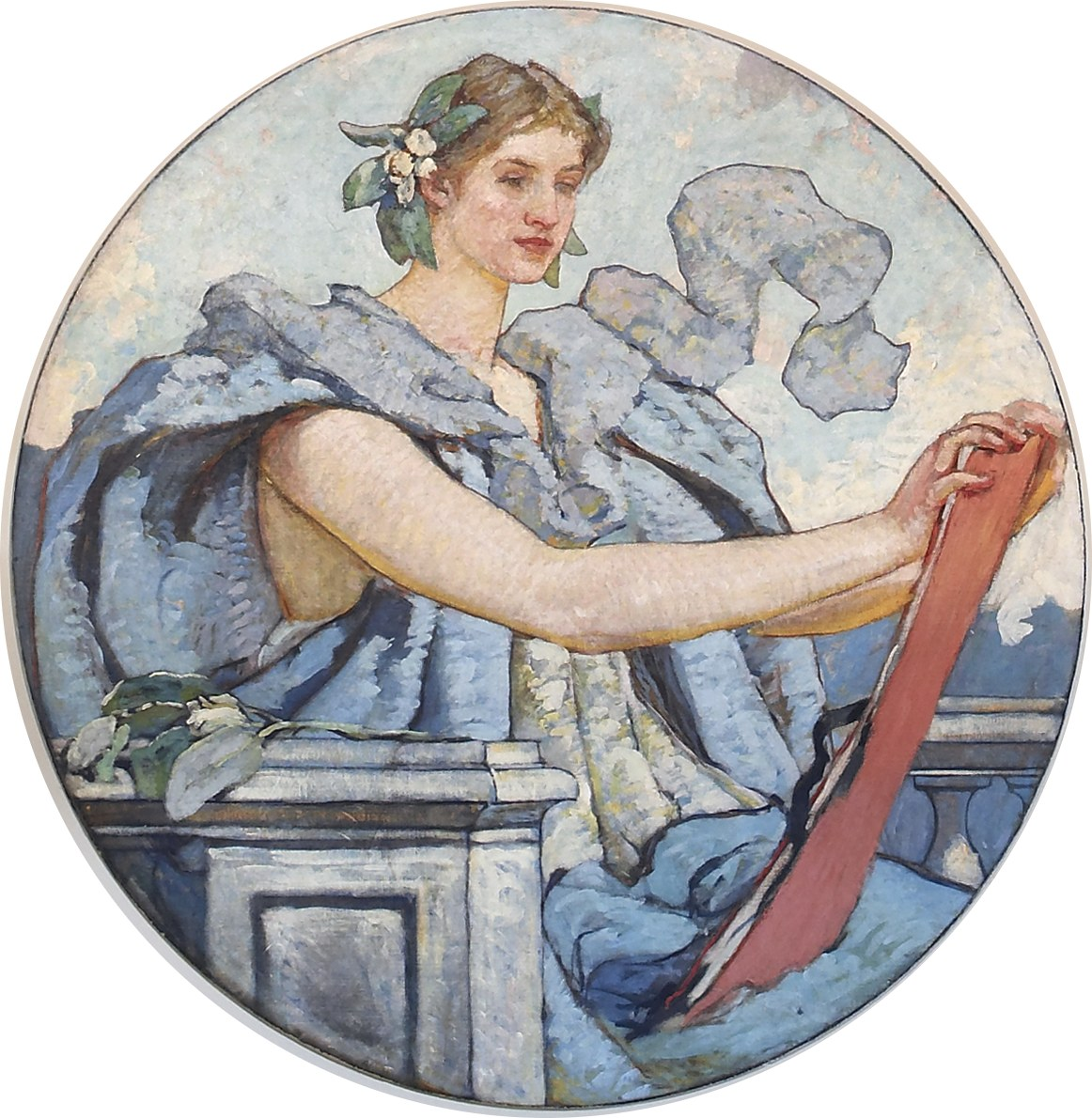
Wisdom (1896), Thomas Jefferson Building, Library of Congress

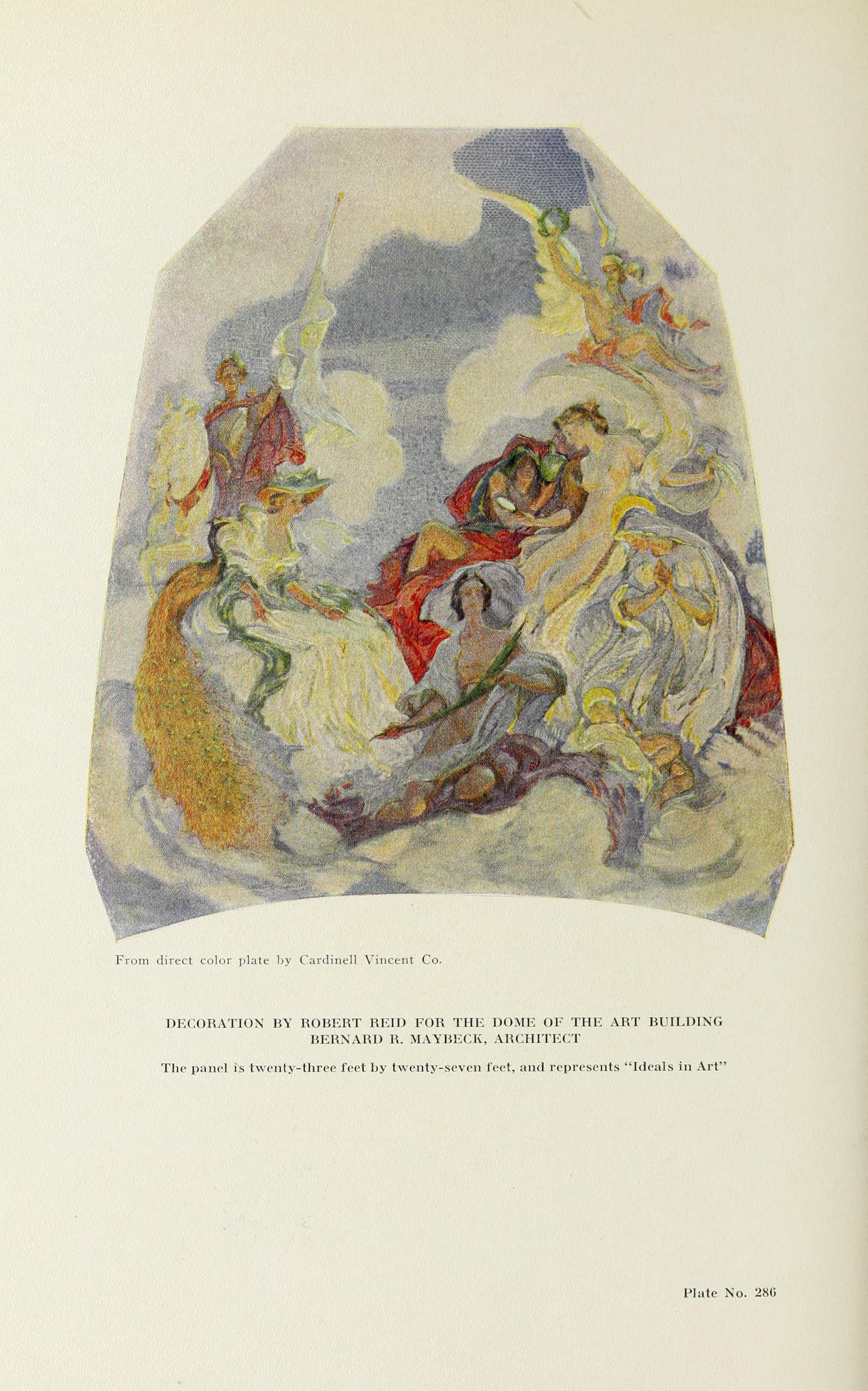
Ideals in Art (domed ceiling panel) (1914), Rotunda, Palace of Fine Arts, San Francisco

=== Stained glass ===
In 1906 Reid completed a series of ten stained glass windows depicting the Life of Christ for the Unitarian Memorial Church in Fairhaven, Massachusetts. For the Church of St. Paul the Apostle in New York City, he created The Martyrdom of St. Paul Window, located at the southwestern end of the nave.

=== U.S. Navy Recruiting Poster ===
"Chicagoans knew Reid as the artist who painted a mammoth Navy recruiting poster that embellished the billboard at the northern terminus of Michigan Avenue for several months" (before 1918).

=== Honors ===
The National Academy of Design elected Reid an Associate member in 1904, and an Academician in 1906. (Note: Post-nominal initials "A.N.A." and "N.A." were added to Reid's name in 1904 and 1906, respectively – the National Academy of Design's acronyms for membership designations: "Associate National Academician" and "National Academician.")

=== Personal ===
Reid also taught Nan Sheets.

Reid died in Clifton Springs, New York.

== Bibliography ==
=== References linked to inline notes ===
- "Reid, Robert (1862–)". The Encyclopædia Britannica. Vol. 23 (11th ed.). Cambridge: University Press. 1910. pp. 4–22. LCCN agr16000592. OCLC 3571848 – via Internet Archive.
- Flinn, John Joseph, ed. (1893). Official Guide to the World's Columbian Exposition. Chicago: The Columbian Guide Company. pp. 102–103. LCCN 45053112. OCLC 1140702 – via Google Books. See World's Columbian Exposition.
- Heller, Jules; Heller, Nancy G., eds. (1995). "Sheets, Nan Jane (1885– )". North American Women Artists of the Twentieth Century: A Biographical Dictionary. New York: Garland Publishing. p. 507. ISBN 978-0-8240-6049-7. LCCN 94049710. OCLC 955223495 – via Internet Archive.
- Neuhaus, Eugen (1915). "Rotunda, Palace of the Fine Arts". The Art of the Exposition. San Francisco: Paul Elder & Company. p. 85. LCCN 15013363. OCLC 1132898377 – via Google Books. Re: Panama–Pacific International Exposition.
- Stuart, Evelyn Marie (January 1918). "Finished Impressions of a Portrait Painter". Fine Arts Journal. 36 (1). Chicago: 33–40. doi:10.2307/25587519. JSTOR 25587519. OCLC 7586587588.

=== Other references ===
- Reid, Robert (March 30 – April 19, 1926). Exhibition: The Affairs of Anatol (Exhibition catalog). New York City: The Gallery of William MacBeth, Inc. OCLC 245523075.
- Katz, Wendy, ed. (2018). The Trans-Mississippi and International Expositions of 1898–1899. Lincoln, Nebraska: University of Nebraska Press. ISBN 9780803278806.
