= Samuel Andrews (chemist) =

British-American chemist and inventor (1836–1904)

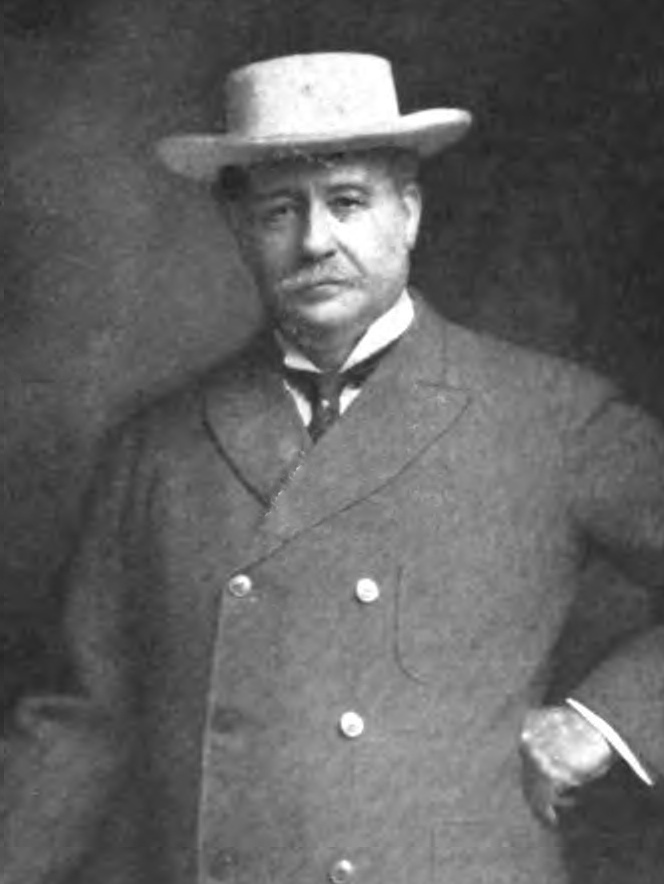
Samuel Andrews (1836-1904)

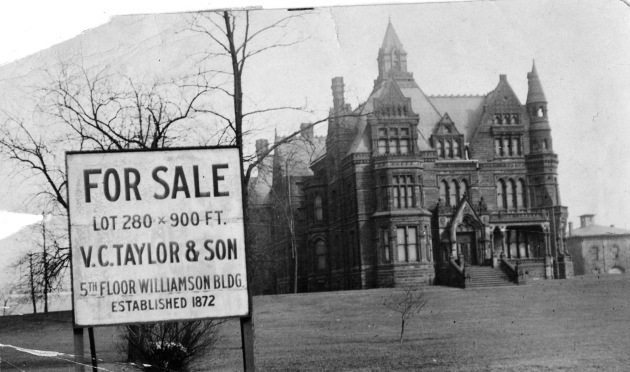
Samuel Andrews' mansion on Euclid Avenue in Cleveland. The home was built in 1882–1885 and demolished in 1923.

Samuel Andrews (1836–1904) was a chemist and inventor. Born in England, he immigrated to the United States before the American Civil War and settled in Cleveland, Ohio. He is best known as a partner in the oil refining firm of Rockefeller, Andrews & Flagler, the major predecessor company of the Standard Oil corporate empire. When the first unit was formed in 1870, Andrews owned 16.67% of Standard Oil stock. He sold his stock early on in 1878 and while he was wealthy, he did not participate in the level of wealth generation that the other founders did.

== Life and career ==
Andrews already had some experience in production in the newly discovered oilfields of western Pennsylvania when, in 1862, he approached two Cleveland produce merchants to become stockholders in a new enterprise. One was John D. Rockefeller, the other Maurice Clark, who saw together the potential in Andrews' plan and invested in the venture. With this capital, Andrews designed and began a small refinery called Andrews, Clark & Co., later christened "Excelsior Works", a mile and a half from downtown Cleveland.

Ida M. Tarbell, an early investigative journalist and the author of The History of Standard Oil, described Andrews as "a mechanical genius", who "devised new processes" to create a better product. He is credited with inventing the chemical process called fractional distillation, which is the separation of crude oil into its components.

While he left Standard Oil early, he did try to display his wealth by building a mansion on Cleveland's Euclid Avenue, also known as "Millionaire's Row". Andrews dreamed of entertaining Queen Victoria at the home, but that dream never came to fruition. The home was so large that the servants could not function effectively, and it was soon closed and remained vacant for 25 years, until it was eventually bulldozed in 1923.

His better-known partners, Rockefeller and Henry Morrison Flagler, are credited with the marketing strategies and schemes that capitalized on Andrews' technical expertise. Andrews often disagreed with Rockefeller's aggressive growth, and soon Rockefeller offered to buy Andrews out. Andrews took the offer and sold out all his stock in 1878. Flagler's wife's ill-health later turned his attention to Florida, where he founded the Florida East Coast Railway and helped develop many resort communities, most notably the cities of Palm Beach and Miami. While Flagler began a new career in Florida, Andrews remained in Ohio and New Jersey. The last remaining influential shareholder, Henry Huttleston Rogers, decided as Flagler to diversify his investments, he embarked on the railroad business and set up the Virginian Railway.

== Death ==
Andrews died of pneumonia at the Hotel Brighton in Atlantic City, New Jersey, on April 14, 1904, aged 67/68. He had fallen ill just seven days earlier. His funeral was held in Cleveland, and he was temporarily interred in the Wade Chapel receiving vault at Lake View Cemetery. The will, probated in New Jersey, gave his fortune to his wife, Mary. After her death, whatever was left was to be apportioned among his children in equal shares. His wife died from an infected abscess in the ear just 11 months later. By this time, a small Andrews family vault had been built at Lake View and Samuel Andrews interred there. Mary Andrews was interred beside him. In 1907, the Andrews children had erected at Lake View a Neoclassical mausoleum at a cost of $50,000 ($1.73 million in 2025 dollars) to $100,000 ($3.46 million in 2025 dollars). Samuel and Mary Andrews were reinterred there in September 1907.
