= Wamsutta Oil Refinery =

Henry Huttleston Rogers Enterprise

Wamsutta Oil Refinery was established around 1861 in McClintocksville in Venango County near Oil City, Pennsylvania, in the United States. It was the first business enterprise of Henry Huttleston Rogers (1840–1909), who became a famous businessman, industrialist and financier.

== Whale oil and petroleum compete ==
Prior to the second half of the 19th century, whale oil was the primary source of fuel for lighting in the United States. The whaling industry was the mainstay for many New England coastal communities for over 200 years. Among these was Fairhaven, Massachusetts, founded on land purchased by English settlers of the Plymouth Colony from an Indian chief and his son, who was named Wamsutta.

In 1854, natural oil (petroleum) was discovered in western Pennsylvania. In 1859, George Bissell and Edwin L. Drake made the first successful use of a drilling rig at Titusville, Pennsylvania. This single well soon exceeded the entire cumulative oil output which had taken place in Europe since the 1650s. The principal product of the oil was kerosene. Another related product was natural gas. Kerosene and natural gas soon replaced whale oil in North America. In New England, whaling reached its peak in 1857, then gradually began a period of decline. The situation was aggravated considerably by the American Civil War, as whaling vessels and crews were diverted to assist in blockading the Confederate coastal areas and ports. By 1900, the whaling industry had collapsed, due in part to the discovery and refining of petroleum from the western Pennsylvania oil fields.

== Henry H. Rogers ==
Perhaps realizing both the trend and opportunity, in 1861, in Fairhaven, 21-year-old Henry Huttleston Rogers pooled his savings of approximately $600 with a friend, Charles H. Ellis. They set out to western Pennsylvania and its newly discovered oil fields. The young partners began their small Wamsutta Oil Refinery at McClintocksville, Pennsylvania, near Oil City. The name "Wamsutta" was apparently selected in honor of their hometown area of Fairhaven, Massachusetts, in New England. Wamsutta was the son of a Native American chief who negotiated an early alliance with the English settlers of the Plymouth Colony in the 17th century. The name chosen for the new refinery may also have derived from the Wamsutta Company in New Bedford, Massachusetts. Opened in 1846, it was a major employer. (The Wamsutta Company was the first of many textile mills that gradually came to supplant whaling as the principal employer in New Bedford).

Rogers and Ellis, and their Wamsutta Oil Refinery, made $30,000 their first year. This amount was more than 3 entire whaling ship trips from back home could hope to earn during an average voyage of more than a year's duration. He was regarded as very successful when Rogers returned home to Fairhaven for a short vacation the next year. There, in 1862, he married his childhood sweetheart, Abbie Palmer Gifford. Abbie returned with him to the oil fields where they lived in a one-room shack along Oil Creek, and he and Ellis worked the Wamsutta Oil Refinery.

== Charles Pratt ==
Rogers met Charles Pratt a short time later. Pratt (1830–1891) had been born in Watertown, Massachusetts. In nearby Boston, he had joined a company specializing in paints and whale oil products. In 1850 or 1851, Pratt came to New York City, where he worked for a similar company handling paint and oil.

Charles Pratt had seen the same trend as Ellis and Rogers and became a pioneer of the natural oil (petroleum) industry. He established a kerosene refinery Astral Oil Works in Brooklyn, New York. Pratt's product later gave rise to the slogan, The holy lamps of Tibet are primed with Astral Oil.

In Pennsylvania in the mid-1860s, Pratt met Ellis and Rogers. Pratt had earlier bought whale-oil from Ellis in Fairhaven. The two young men agreed to sell the entire output of their small refinery to Pratt's company at a fixed price.

Ellis and Rogers had no wells and were dependent upon purchasing crude oil to refine and sell to Pratt. A few months later, crude oil prices suddenly increased due to manipulation by speculators. The young entrepreneurs struggled to try to live up to their contract with Pratt, but soon their surplus was wiped out. Before long, they were heavily in debt to Pratt.

Charles Ellis gave up, but in 1866, Rogers went to Pratt in New York City, and told him he would take personal responsibility for the entire debt. This so impressed Pratt that he hired 26-year-old Rogers immediately. In the next few years Rogers became, in the words of Elbert Hubbard, Pratt's "hands and feet and eyes and ears" (Little Journeys to the Homes, 1909). The following year, in 1867, Charles Pratt joined with his protégé Rogers to form Charles Pratt and Company.

== Standard Oil, Henry Rogers as a tycoon and philanthropist ==
Pratt's companies (and he and Rogers) became part of John D. Rockefeller's Standard Oil in 1874. After joining Standard Oil, Rogers invested heavily in various industries, including copper, steel, mining, and railways. The Virginian Railway is widely considered his final life's achievement. Rogers amassed a great fortune, estimated at over $100 million, and became one of the wealthiest men in the United States. He was also a generous philanthropist, providing many public works for his hometown of Fairhaven and financially assisting such notables as Mark Twain, Helen Keller, and Booker T. Washington.

== Pennsylvania oil heritage ==
Near McClintocksville and Oil City, in western Pennsylvania, Oil Creek State Park and many heritage sites to tell the story and memorialize the people of the oil boom of the late 19th and early 20th centuries.
