= South Improvement Company =

Oil company

- Founded: 1871; 155 years ago
- Founder: Thomas A. Scott
- Defunct: April 2, 1872

The South Improvement Company was a short-lived Pennsylvania corporation founded in late 1871 which existed until the state of Pennsylvania suspended its charter on April 2, 1872. It was created by major railroad and oil interests, and was widely seen as part of John D. Rockefeller's early efforts to organize and control the oil industry in the United States under Standard Oil. The company's purpose was to end a rate war with the rail trunk lines by dividing oil traffic more evenly between the Pennsylvania Railroad, the Erie Railroad, and the New York Central railroads. The second purpose of the company was to limit the production of refined oil - the country had a daily refining capacity of 40,000 barrels and a market for only 16,000. Although the company never shipped any oil, the South Improvement Company scheme caused widespread attention to be focused on the relationships between big railroads and big businesses that wanted and demanded favorable treatment. In what would become known as the Cleveland Massacre, John D. Rockefeller and Henry Flagler bought eighteen refineries, only one of which wasn't located in Cleveland over a month's time between mid-February and mid-March 1872.

== Formation ==
Thomas A. Scott, president of the Pennsylvania Railroad established the South Improvement Company in the fall of 1871. A group representing the trunk railroad interests and oil refinery interests met in New York in late November, 1871, to discuss the creation of the company. Included in this meeting were William Henry Vanderbilt and John D. Rockefeller. The scheme was intended to benefit both the railroads and major refiners, notably those controlled by Rockefeller through secret rebates.

Rockefeller had earlier merged several of the Cleveland area refineries and issued 2,000 shares of stock, of which 900 were controlled by Rockefeller and his partners. Rockefeller then started negotiations to collude with the three major railroads running through Cleveland: the Erie Railroad, the Pennsylvania Railroad, and the New York Central Railroad. The result of these secret negotiations were as follows: (1) The official rate per barrel from Cleveland to New York would be $2.56, but South Improvement would receive a $1.06 rebate; (2) The railroads would also pay South Improvement $1.06 per barrel of oil shipped that was not produced by South; (3) The railroads would also give reports of the shipping destinations, costs, and dates of all of South's competitors; (4) The commerce would be divided evenly among the railroads, with a double share going to Pennsylvania Railroad; and (5) South would provide tank cars and loading facilities. The secret concessions would have helped lessen the "vicious" competition among the railroad lines by giving a steady, standardized flow of commerce.

Shares of the South Improvement Company were allocated to interests in the oil refining cities as follows: Pittsburgh received 485, Philadelphia received 505, Cleveland received 720, and New York received 180 (represented by Jabez A. Bostwick). Peter H. Watson, as president of the South Improvement Company, received 100 shares. Since both Bostwick and Watson were secretly allied with Standard Oil, Rockefeller kept control of the company from the Pennsylvania oil refiners and Pennsylvania Railroad interests. Charles Pratt of New York and John Dustin Archbold and Jacob Vandergrift of the oil regions had refused to join and so did not receive shares.

Rockefeller used the company as a tool to force Cleveland refiners to further consolidate. Between mid-February and mid-March 1872, John D. Rockefeller and Henry Flagler bought twenty-three companies, eighteen of which were oil refineries, and all but one of them were located in Cleveland. Historians would come to call this the "Cleveland Massacre." An independent refiner who thought he could survive found that when he went to borrow money, all the Cleveland banks were in Standard Oil's pocket. Rockefeller had offered every important Cleveland banker a chance to buy Standard Oil stock, ensuring the welfare of the Standard Oil company.

== Dissolution ==
Word leaked out of the South Improvement scheme, and the proposed 100% increase in rail shipping rates inflamed the independent producers and many smaller refineries. Following a summit and vocal protest by the independent oil producers and refiners led by Henry Huttleston Rogers and the Charles Pratt and Company refining interests of Brooklyn, New York, which came close to physical warfare in western Pennsylvania in March 1872 (and came to be known as the "Oil War"), the railroads agreed to back down.

Crude oil suppliers formed their own organization called the Petroleum Producers' Union which levied a boycott on all members of the South Improvement Company on March 1, 1872. The producers' union also agreed to stop drilling wells for 30 days. On March 2, 1872, the Pennsylvania Railroad sent a message to the oil regions indicating that their lines would not harm the mutually beneficial relationship between the railroads and the producers. By March 9th, newspapers were generally attacking the South Improvement Company as an assault on free enterprise. On March 11, 1872, New York refiners sent a delegation to the oil regions to back the suppliers' opposition to the South Improvement Company. On March 23, John D. Rockefeller met with producers, refiners, and railroad leaders. On March 25, 1872, railroad leaders ended their contracts with South and publicly announced that thereafter no rebates would be made or allowed. The state of Pennsylvania suspended its charter on April 2, 1872. On April 10, the suppliers' oil embargo was officially lifted. Two weeks after the railroad contracts with the South Improvement Company were ended, the Pennsylvania Railroad gave rebates to refiners on its lines.

== Aftermath ==
After the company's dissolution, refiners were once again in a position where they competed with each other on a regional basis - now largely Rockefeller in Cleveland, Charles Lockhart in Pittsburgh, William G. Warden in Philadelphia, Charles Pratt in New York, and John Dustin Archbold in the oil regions. In April 1872, these leaders tried to coordinate with each other to obtain better rates from the railroads by creating the National Refiners' Association. This group would be administered by a central board of their own choosing, would operate in the open, would buy and allot crude oil to members via quota, and would negotiate with railroads on behalf of members. The oil producers did not object to the organization because the organizers made clear they were not seeking to reduce the price of crude oil. Rockefeller was chosen to head the organization because refiners did not fear his takeover of this organization. The association collapsed at the beginning of the Panic of 1873. Standard Oil would buy up the interests of these four oil leaders by 1875 and they would in turn administer these regions for the company.

== See also ==
- Jay Gould
- Ida M. Tarbell
- Cornelius Vanderbilt
