= Charles Pratt and Company =

New York City oil company (1867–1874)

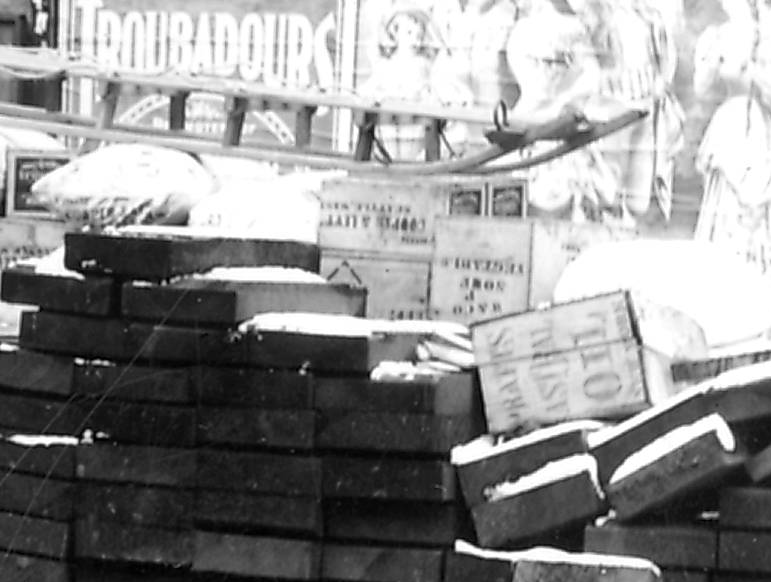
A pile of goods outside the Cooper & Levy store in Seattle during the Klondike Gold Rush includes a container of Pratts Astral Oil, right of center.

Charles Pratt and Company was an oil company that was formed in 1867 by Charles Pratt and Henry H. Rogers in Brooklyn, New York. It became part of John D. Rockefeller's Standard Oil organization in 1874.

== History ==
Pratt, born in Watertown, Massachusetts, had come to New York around 1850-1851, where he worked for a company specializing in paints and whale-oil products. Pratt became a pioneer of the natural oil industry, and established his kerosene refinery Astral Oil Works in Brooklyn. Pratt's product later gave rise to the slogan, "The holy lamps of Tibet are primed with Astral Oil."

In the mid-1860s, Pratt met two aspiring young men, Charles Ellis and Henry H. Rogers in western Pennsylvania. Pratt had bought whale-oil from Charles Ellis in Fairhaven, Massachusetts, the young men's hometown. He purchased the entire future output of their small venture, Wamsutta Oil Refinery, at McClintocksville, near Oil City at a fixed price.

Ellis and Rogers had no wells and were dependent upon purchasing crude oil to refine and sell to Pratt. A few months later, crude oil prices suddenly increased due to manipulation by speculators. The young entrepreneurs and their Wamsutta Oil Refinery struggled to try to live up to their contract with Pratt, but soon their surplus was wiped out. Before long, they were heavily in debt to him.

Charles Ellis gave up, but in 1866, Henry Rogers went to Pratt in New York, and told him he would take personal responsibility for the entire debt. This so impressed Pratt that he immediately hired him for his own organization. In the next few years Rogers became, in the words of Elbert Hubbard, Pratt's "hands and feet and eyes and ears" (Little Journeys to the Homes, 1909).

Pratt made Rogers foreman of his Brooklyn refinery, with a promise of a partnership if sales ran over fifty thousand dollars a year. Rogers and his wife Abbie moved to Brooklyn and lived frugally. Abbie brought his meals to the "works"; often he would sleep three hours a night rolled up in a blanket by the side of a still. Rogers moved steadily from foreman to manager, and then superintendent of Pratt's Astral Oil Refinery. Pratt finally gave Rogers an interest in the business. In 1867, with Henry Rogers as a partner, he established the firm of Charles Pratt and Company.

In the early 1870s, Pratt and Rogers became involved in conflicts with John D. Rockefeller's infamous South Improvement Company, which was basically a scheme to obtain favorable net rates from the Pennsylvania Railroad (PRR) and other railroads through a secret system of rebates. Rockefeller and the South Improvement Company scheme outraged independent oil producers in western Pennsylvania and refineries there and afar alike.

The opposition to the South Improvement Company scheme among the New York refiners was led by Rogers. The New York interests formed an association, and about the middle of March, 1872, sent a committee of three, with Rogers, of Charles Pratt and Company, as head, to Oil City to consult with the Oil Producers' Union there. Their arrival in the oil regions was a matter of great satisfaction. Working with the Pennsylvania independents, they managed to forge an agreement with the PRR and other railroads whose leaders eventually agreed to open rates to all promised to end their shady dealings with South Improvement. The oil men were most exultant, but their joy was to be short-lived, for Rockefeller had already begun forming his Standard Oil organization and was busy trying another approach, which included frequently buying up opposing interests.

Rockefeller approached Charles Pratt with his plans of cooperation and consolidation. Pratt talked it over with Rogers, and they decided that the combination would benefit them. Rogers formulated terms, which guaranteed financial security and jobs for Pratt and himself. John D. Rockefeller quietly accepted the offer on Rogers' exact terms. Charles Pratt and Company (including Astral Oil) became one of the important formerly independent refiners to join Rockefeller's organization, and it was to become part of the Standard Oil Trust in 1874. Pratt's son, Charles Millard Pratt (1858-1913) became Secretary of Standard Oil.

Pratts' protégé, Henry H. Rogers soon rose to become one of the key men of Standard Oil, and was a Vice-President by 1890. Rogers, who kept his residence in New York after moving there at Pratt's request, invested outside of Standard Oil and became one of the wealthiest men in the world. He had interests in oil, gas, steel, copper, coal, and railroads, and eventually founded and built the Virginian Railway at the end of his own career.

Charles Pratt is credited with recognizing the growing need for trained industrial workers in a changing economy. In 1886, he founded and endowed the Pratt Institute, which opened in Brooklyn, New York in 1887.

Pratt settled in Glen Cove, Long Island, New York about 1890. In an effort to keep his family near him, he purchased large tracts of land surrounding his estate, totaling 1,100 acres (4.5 km²). However, he died the next year, 1891, in New York City.

At Glen Cove, on Long Island, Pratt's six sons and two daughters later built their homes. As of 2004, most of the extant Pratt mansions along the Gold Coast there are still in use:

- Welwyn, originally the home of Harold I. Pratt, is now the Holocaust Memorial and Tolerance Center of Nassau County on the grounds of the Welwyn Preserve.
- The Braes, originally owned by Herbert L. Pratt, is now the Webb Institute of Naval Architecture.
- The Manor House, built for John Teele Pratt, is now the Glen Cove Mansion Hotel and Conference Center.
- Poplar Hill, the Frederic B. Pratt house, is now owned by Glengariff Nursing Home.
- Killenworth, originally the house of George Dupont Pratt, is now the retreat for the Soviet Delegation to the United Nations.

The current Charles Pratt & Co. exists, according to its website "as a central administrative office providing professional financial services for the descendants of Charles Pratt and selected other private clients."

== See also ==
- Ida M. Tarbell
