= Coe (surname) =

Coe is a surname of English origin. At the time of the British Census of 1881, its frequency was highest in Northamptonshire (8.9 times the British average), followed by Norfolk, Cambridgeshire, Suffolk, Essex, Leicestershire, Huntingdonshire, Surrey, London and Kent. Notable people with the surname include:

- Ada M. Coe (1890–1983), American hispanist teacher
- Alexander Paul Coe (born 1969), better known by his stage name Sasha, Welsh DJ
- Alexis Coe, American presidential historian
- Alistair Coe (born 1984), Australian politician
- Amanda Coe (born 1965), English screenwriter and novelist
- Barry Coe (1934–2019), American actor
- Charles Robert "Charlie" Coe (1923–2001), American golfer
- Christine Sadler Coe (1902–1983), American journalist
- Cornelius Coe (born 1975), American football player
- David Coe (businessman) (1954–2013), Australian businessman
- David Allan Coe (1939–2026), American singer and songwriter
- Dawn Coe-Jones (1960–2016), Canadian golfer
- Denis Coe (1929–2015), British Labour Party politician
- Douglas Coe (1928–2017), director of The Fellowship Christian organization
- Edwin Coe (1840–1909), American newspaper editor and politician
- Ernest F. Coe (1866–1951), American landscape designer
- Frank Coe (1851–1931), Old West cowboy, and for a time, gunman in the company of Billy the Kid, as a member of the Lincoln County Regulators
- Frank Coe (1907–1980), American Treasury official, and suspected Soviet spy who fled to China
- George Albert Coe, American psychologist
- George Coe (1856–1941), Old West cowboy and for a time gunman alongside Billy the Kid during the Lincoln County War
- George Coe (1929–2015), American actor
- George Coe (Michigan politician) (1811–1869), American politician, Lt. Governor of Michigan
- Gideon Coe (born 1967), British radio presenter
- Hank Coe (1946–2021), American politician
- Harry Coe (athlete) (1885–1977), American athlete
- Henry Waldo Coe (1857–1927), American frontier physician and politician
- Imogen Coe (born 1962), British biochemist
- Jack Coe (1918–1956), American tent evangelist
- Jimmy Coe (1921–2004), American jazz saxophonist
- James Wiggin Coe (1909–1943), American submariner
- Jo-Anne L. Coe (1933–2002), American federal official
- John D. Coe (1755–1824), New York politician
- John W. Coe (1839–1890), New York politician
- Jonas Coe (1805–1864), also known as Juan Coe, Uruguayan/Argentinian naval officer
- Jonathan Coe (born 1961), British novelist
- Kevin Coe (1947–2025), convicted rapist from Spokane, Washington
- Lorne Coe (born 1949), Canadian politician
- Mary (Mai) Huttleston Rogers Coe (1875–1924), American heiress, wife of William Robertson Coe
- Matchett Herring Coe (1907–1999), American sculptor
- Michael D. Coe (1929–2019), American anthropologist
- Natalie Mai Vitetti (née Coe) (1910–1987), daughter of William Rogers Coe
- Nathan Coe (born 1984), Australian soccer player
- Nathan Coe (businessman), Australian businessman
- Nick Coe (born 1998), American football player
- Paul Coe (1949–2025), Indigenous Australian rights activist
- Peter Coe (1919–2008), British athlete and coach; father of Sebastian Coe
- Peter Coe (director) (1929–1987), English theatre director
- Phil Coe (1839–1871), soldier, Old West gambler, and businessman
- Richard L. Coe (1914–1995), American theater and cinema critic
- Robert Coe (colonist) (1596–1689), Puritan
- Robert D. Coe, American diplomat and former U.S. ambassador to Denmark
- Robert Douglas Coe, British ambassador
- Robert Glen Coe (1956–2000), American murderer
- Ron Coe (1933–1988), English professional cyclist
- Samuel Coe (1873–1955), English cricketer
- Sarah Coe (ice hockey) (born 2003), Canadian ice hockey player
- Sebastian Coe (born 1956), British athlete and politician
- Sophie Coe (1933–1994), American anthropologist, food historian, and author
- Sue Coe (born 1951), English artist and illustrator
- Terry Coe, Niuean politician and former cabinet minister
- Terese Coe, American writer
- Tony Coe (1934–2023), English jazz musician
- Tucker Coe, a pseudonym of American writer Donald E. Westlake
- Wallace Coe, New Zealand boxer
- Wesley Coe (1879–1926), American athlete
- William Coe (governor), American-Somoan politician and former Governor of Guam
- William Robertson Coe (1869–1955), American businessman
- William Robertson Coe II (1926–2009), American archaeologist and Mayanist academic
- William Rogers Coe (1901–1971), American businessman
