= Abbie G. Rogers =

American philanthropist (1841–1894)

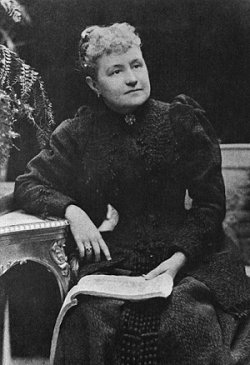
- Born: Abigail Palmer Gifford; January 20, 1841; Fairhaven, Massachusetts, US
- Died: May 21, 1894 (aged 53); New York City, US
- Resting place: Riverside Cemetery
- Spouse: Henry Huttleston Rogers
- Children: Anne Engle Benjamin; Cara Leland Broughton; Millicent Gifford Rogers; Mary Huttleston Coe; Henry Huttleston Rogers Jr.

Abigail Gifford Rogers (January 20, 1841 – May 21, 1894) was the first wife of Henry Huttleston Rogers (1840–1909), an American business magnate.

As children, Abbie and Henry grew up and went to school together in Fairhaven, Massachusetts, a small coastal fishing town with a whaling heritage. They were married in 1862, and started their family life together in a one-room shack in the newly discovered western Pennsylvania oil fields. Although he and Abbie lived frugally for many years, by 1875, Henry Rogers had risen in the petroleum industry to become one of the key men in John D. Rockefeller’s Standard Oil Trust. He invested heavily in various industries, including copper, steel, mining, and railways. The Virginian Railway is widely considered his final life's achievement. Rogers amassed a great fortune, estimated at over $100 million, and became one of the wealthiest men in the United States.

Abbie and Henry Rogers were generous, providing many public works for their hometown of Fairhaven, including the Town Hall which Abbie donated in 1894 shortly before her death. Rogers also financially assisted such notables as Mark Twain, Helen Keller, and Booker T. Washington.

Abbie and Henry Rogers had six children, four of whom survived to adulthood. She died suddenly on May 21, 1894, following an operation in New York City. After her death, Henry Rogers is said to have immersed himself even more in his work during the 15 years he outlived her. When he died in 1909, he was interred with her at Riverside Cemetery in Fairhaven.

== Childhood in Fairhaven, Massachusetts ==
Abigail Palmer Gifford was the younger daughter of Captain Peleg W. Gifford and his wife, Amelia L. Hammond. Abbie's father had been a whaling ship captain and participated in the "Great Stone Fleet" of scuttled ships that blockaded Charleston Harbor during the American Civil War. It is said that Captain Gifford loved to discuss his career as a very successful ship-master. The Giffords' home, built in 1835, was located at 36 Green Street in Fairhaven, (now numbered 115 Green Street).

As Abbie grew up, one of her schoolmates and neighbors in the small coastal town was young Henry Huttleston Rogers, nicknamed "Hen", her future husband. Both Abbie and Henry were descendants of colonists who had arrived at the Plymouth Colony on the Mayflower in 1620.

There, in 1862, Abbie Palmer Gifford married young Henry Rogers, her childhood sweetheart. She returned with him to the oil fields where they lived in a one-room shack along Oil Creek, where her young husband and Ellis worked the Wamsutta Oil Refinery.

After 1874, the Rogers family continued to live in New York City, but vacationed at Fairhaven, where a large mansion was erected for them.

== Family and children ==
Abbie was the mother of five children, four girls and a boy. Another little son had died at birth. Their eldest daughter, Anne Engle Rogers, was born in 1865 in Pennsylvania.

The family moved to New York in 1866. Daughter Cara Leland Rogers was born in Fairhaven in 1867, Millicent was born in 1873, followed by Mary (who became known as Mai) in 1875.

Their son, Henry Huttleston Rogers Jr., was born in 1879, and came to be known as Harry. In adulthood, after the death of his father, he became known as Colonel Henry Huddleston Rogers, apparently returning to an earlier spelling of his middle name. The title of Colonel was apparently honorific, not uncommon in those times.

Local historians recall that the children of Henry Huttleston Rogers and Abbie Gifford Rogers were far more than vacationers in Fairhaven. Their roots were deep in the community. They spent time with grandparents and family friends, and became knowledgeable about the traditions of the old whaling town.

=== Anne Engle Rogers Benjamin ===
Anne married William Evarts Benjamin, a prominent Boston publisher and collector. They had 2 children, Beatrice Benjamin Cartwright and Henry Rogers Benjamin.

=== Cara Leland Rogers Broughton, Lady Fairhaven ===
In 1890, Cara Leland Rogers married Bradford Ferris Duff of New York. Their marriage was to end a year later, in 1891, when her new husband, aged twenty-four, died of a lung ailment at the Rogers' Fairhaven residence, making Cara a widow at twenty-three.

In the 1890s, Cara's father had begun to consider a sewer and water project for the Fairhaven community. After much consultation with experts, he had chosen to adopt a sewerage plan developed in England known as the "Shone Sewer System". To manage the project, a young English engineer, Urban Hanlon Broughton, was sent to town by the Shone executives to explain procedure and direct the actual work.

During his stay, Cara Duff had become acquainted with the young Englishman. By 1895, the sewer work was well on the way to completion, and Cara Rogers Duff and Urban Broughton had decided to be married. Cara became Mrs. Urban Broughton in late 1895. Departing on Christmas Day, they sailed across the Atlantic Ocean on a honeymoon trip to Europe.

The Broughtons' first child, a son, was born in Fairhaven in 1896, and was named Urban Huttleston Broughton. A second son was born in 1900, and was called Henry Rogers Broughton.

Although Urban Broughton was by birth an English subject, he spent more than twenty-five years in America, many of them in Chicago, Illinois. Urban Broughton became president of Utah Consolidated Mining Co. in 1901, and was chosen a director and a manager of the United Metals Selling Co., the selling agency for Amalgamated Copper. He was also a director of the Atlas Tack Co. in Fairhaven, the Santa Rica Mining Co., and the Butte Coalition Mining Co. in Montana.

After the sudden death of his father-in-law (Henry H. Rogers Sr.) in 1909, Urban Broughton became president of The Virginian Railway Company.

In 1912, Urban, Cara, and their two sons, Huttleston Broughton, and Henry Broughton, moved to England. They took up residence in Mayfair, London. Urban became a member of Parliament (MP). He found pleasure in this new career, becoming a close personal friend of Prime Minister Bonar Law. Cara devoted herself to family matters and other domestic duties. Their young sons soon became thoroughly-oriented British subjects.

During World War I, both Urban and Cara were very active in the war effort. Urban served the English government in many ways. He published a strong brochure designed to appeal to the good will of America entitled "The British Empire at War".

Cara offered all her efforts to the good of her adopted country as well, sponsoring many types of war work. She was deeply interested in the well-being of Bethnal Green Military Hospital. She gave hospitable parties for wounded soldiers at the family home in Broadoaks, Byfleet.

During the 1920s, the Broughtons visited Fairhaven several times. In 1926, Cara purchased the revolutionary war site of Fort Phoenix and donated it to the city of Fairhaven, Massachusetts. Today, it is a park.

Urban Broughton died in 1929, at the age of 72. Earlier in the same year, his name had been pending for elevation to the peerage by King George V. On May 2, 1929, the King proclaimed "... Cara Leland Broughton, widow of Urban Hanlon Broughton, may henceforth enjoy the same style and title as if her husband...had survived and received the title and dignity of Baron Fairhaven".

The eldest son, Huttleston, was elevated to his father's barony, and became the first Baron Fairhaven, and Cara, the first Lady Fairhaven.

=== Millicent Gifford Rogers ===
Millicent "Millie" Gifford Rogers was born in 1873. It is recorded that the child loved to draw sketches and read. She is to have once said on a visit to Fairhaven "I wish we had a good library!" However, in 1890 she died of heart failure at age 17.

The grieving Rogers family sought an appropriate means of memorializing her short life. Because she had been an avid reader, especially of poetry, the Rogers decided that they would build and donate to the town of Fairhaven a library named for her and given in the names of her sisters and brother.

In the same year she had died, land was acquired and plan were begun to erect in Fairhaven a unique and lavish tribute to the arts, the splendid yet functional Millicent Library. The cornerstone was laid in September, 1891 at a quiet morning ceremony with only the family and their clergyman, Rev. J.M. Leighton, in attendance. After prayer, Millie's little brother, Harry, set the cornerstone. Within its confines were a sketch of Millicent, a tracing of the Rogers' ancestry, and a copy of the Fairhaven Star carrying a picture of the proposed building.

The Millicent Library describes the memorial window to the little girl who wished for a good library in Fairhaven as follows:

In the Library, just to the left of the main entrance, is a stunning stained-glass window made by Clayton and Bell of London. In the central panel is the figure of Erato, the Muse of Poetry, and her features bear a striking resemblance to those of the girl to whose memory the library was erected.

=== Mary Huttleston Rogers Coe ===
Mary Huttleston Rogers, known as "Mai", was the youngest daughter, born in 1875 in Fairhaven. Mai was educated at private seminary schools, spoke fluent French, played the piano, and was interested in art and decoration.

After an earlier marriage which was unsuccessful (her father and family friend Mark Twain labeled her first husband a "scalawag"), on June 4, 1900, she married William Robertson Coe, a 30-year-old insurance company manager. Coe had met her during a transatlantic crossing. Between 1900 and 1910, the couple had four children: William Rogers Coe (1901–1971), Robert Douglas Coe (1902–1985), Henry Huttleston Rogers Coe (1907–1966), and Natalie Mai Coe Vitetti (1910–1987).

By 1910, Coe had become president of insurance broker Johnson & Higgins, and he was involved in insuring the hull of the RMS Titanic which sank on its maiden voyage in 1912. Coe rose to become Chairman of the Board of Johnson and Higgins by 1916, a position he held until 1943.

Coe was on the Board of Directors of The Virginian Railway Company from 1910 until his death in 1955, and headed the company for a brief period during World War II. He was also a director of Loup Creek Colliery and the Wyoming Land Company.

Mai and her husband had a large estate, Planting Fields, built on the Gold Coast of Long Island, New York. They named the manor house "Coe Hall". Mai and her husband shared a love of horticulture. Following an extended illness, Mai died in 1924, and was interred nearby. In 1949, their estate was donated by Coe to become Planting Fields Arboretum State Historic Park.

=== Henry Huttleston Rogers Jr. ===
Henry Huttleston Rogers Jr. was born in 1879. He came to be known as Harry. He was the youngest of the Rogers children.

Harry became a favorite of Rogers family friend Mark Twain, who in 1897 dedicated his new book Following The Equator with the following quipping preface:

This Book Is Affectionately Inscribed To My Young Friend,

- HARRY ROGERS -

With recognition of what he is and apprehension of what he may become, unless he form himself a little more closely upon the model of - The Author

As a young adult, Harry often joined his father and family friends on trips aboard their luxury steam yacht Kanawha, built in 1899.

In 1900, Harry married his first wife, Mary Benjamin (1879-1956). Mary was the niece of Harry's brother-in-law, William E. Benjamin. He and his wife traveled to Virginia with his father and Twain on the Kanawha in September, 1907 when the latter spoke at Robert Fulton Day at the Jamestown Exposition. After their 1929 divorce, he married Marguerite von Braun Savell Miles (married 1929-33) and in 1933 married a third time to Pauline Van der Voort Dresser.

Harry journeyed again with his father and Twain to Norfolk, Virginia, in April, 1909 for the dedication ceremonies and dinner to celebrate the completion of the Virginian Railway, which turned out to be his father's final life achievement. After his father's death the following month, Harry took over his father's seat on the Board of Directors of the new railroad, with his brother-in-law, Urban Broughton, serving as the railroad's President.

He assembled a valuable collection of model sailing ships, which were donated the United States Naval Academy at Annapolis, Maryland, after his death in 1935.

Harry and Mary Rogers had a son, Harry III, and a daughter, Millicent Rogers, a prominent socialite during the 1930s and 1940s whose vast collection of turquoise jewelry and Native American artifacts are housed in the Millicent Rogers Museum in Taos, New Mexico.

== 1894: A new Town Hall and tragedy ==
In 1894, Fairhaven received the gift of a new Town Hall from the Rogers Family. Abbie dedicated it to the memory of her mother. The following text about Abbie Rogers is from the Millicent Library, Fairhaven Massachusetts.

"Mother of six children, Mrs. Rogers is represented as having been of a quiet and retiring disposition, completely devoid of the ostentation often associated with great wealth. Contemporary photographs attest to a shy and gentle charm of feature, and she is known to have cherished a deep affection for Fairhaven and a nostalgia for the simple ways of her childhood.

"She was, therefore, delighted to become the donor of Fairhaven's beautiful new 'Town House,' and on February 22nd and 23d, 1894, she attended dedication exercises and received graciously at the splendid Dedication Ball, in the first gala functions marking the opening of the new building.

"It was not given those attending these happy festivities to know that - but three months later - in May, 1894, this gentle woman was to die in New York City after an operation performed to save her life."

== Death ==
Abbie Palmer Gifford Rogers died unexpectedly on May 21, 1894, age 53 in New York City. She had been undergoing an operation to remove a tumor. Her widower, Henry Rogers Sr., eventually remarried, but had no children with his second wife. Outliving her two days short of 15 years, after his death on May 19, 1909, he was interred beside her in Fairhaven's Riverside Cemetery.

== Legacy ==
The Town Hall in Fairhaven survives, as do many other gifts of the Rogers' family to Fairhaven, where she and her husband grew up. The home of Captain Peleg Gifford (Abbie's childhood home), a two-story gable-end frame house built in the Greek Revival style at 36 Green Street, has been preserved. It and many other historic buildings in Fairhaven are opened periodically for special public tours.

The bronze plaque on the Fairhaven Town Hall, reads:

This Building was presented to the Town of Fairhaven February 22, 1894, three months prior to the death of the donor Abbie Palmer Gifford Rogers. The people of Fairhaven in expressing their appreciation and gratitude for the gift would also record the sorrow they feel as a community through the loss of one whose life was full of good works. May this structure in its strength and beauty ever stand as commemorative of her character and thoughtful kindness.

== See also ==
- Standard Oil
- William N. Page

== External links and further reading ==
- Elbert Hubbard, 1909, Little Journeys to the Homes
- Tarbell, Ida M. The History of Standard Oil
- The Wealthy 100: From Benjamin Franklin to Bill Gates - A Ranking of the Richest Americans, Past and Present. Michael Klepper and Robert Gunther (contributor). Secaucus, New Jersey: Carol Publishing Group, 1996.
- Millicent Library, Fairhaven MA, Henry Rogers homepage
- Ohio History
- Some Memories of Cara Leland Rogers Broughton the first Lady Fairhaven material researched and integrated by Mabel Hoyle Knipe Fairhaven, Massachusetts, March, 1984
- The Story of Fairhaven compiled by Thomas Tripp in 1929
- Planting Fields website, Mai Rogers Coe and family history
- Fairhaven Massachusetts Public Schools
- Napoleon Series Henry H. Rogers webpage
- Olean Town history
- Oil History website
- Venango County Pennsylvania Oil History
- Henry Rogers and Fairhaven website
