= William Coe =

William Coe may refer to:

- William Coe (governor), Governor of Guam
- Wesley Coe (William Wesley Coe, Jr., 1879–1926), Olympic shot put athlete
- William Robertson Coe (1869–1955), English-born American insurance and railways executive, philanthropist, racehorse owner/breeder
- William Rogers Coe (1901–1971), American railways executive, son of William Robertson Coe
- William R. Coe (archaeologist) (1926–2009), American archaeologist and Mayan scholar, son of William Rogers Coe
