= Vitetti =

Vitetti is a surname. It may refer to:

- Leonardo Vitetti (1895–1973), count, Italian diplomat who served as a delegate to the United Nations from 1956 to 1958
- Natalie Mai Vitetti, countess, the only daughter of insurance and railroad executive William Robertson Coe and Mai Huttleston (née Rogers) Coe
