= Len Gridley Everett =

American painter (1925 - 1984)

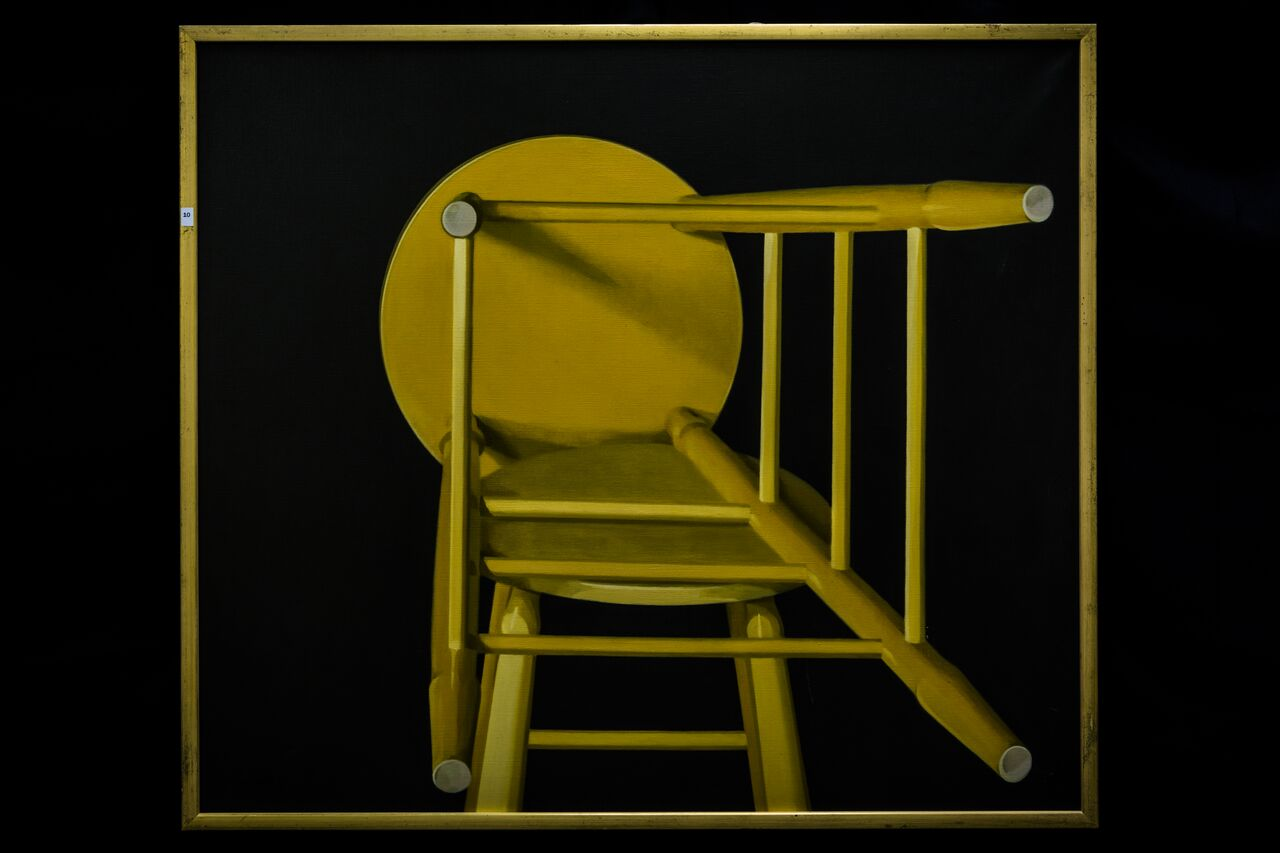
"Two Stools," Len Gridley Everett. 1976.

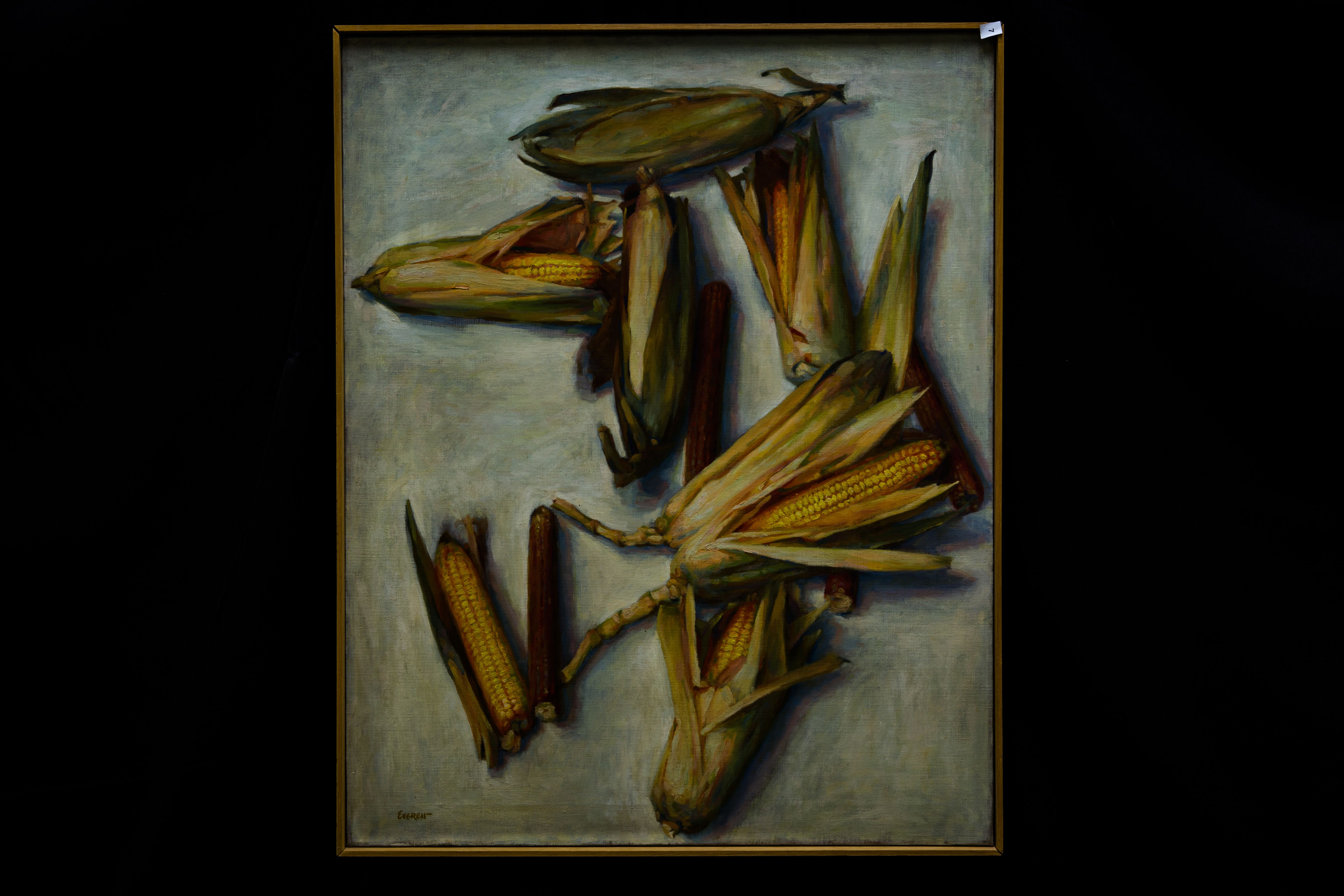
"Illinois Corn" by Len Gridley Everett. Oil.

Len Gridley Everett (April 18, 1925 – November 25, 1984) was an American painter.

== Early life ==
Everett born in Burlington, Iowa, April 18, 1925 to Maude Gridley Everett and Reid Everett. He grew up near Monmouth, Illinois and graduated from Kirkwood, Illinois High School.

== Career ==
Len served in the United States Navy during World War II. He attended the State University of Iowa, Iowa City, (BFA-1950, MFA-1952). Everett taught at the University of Iowa briefly. He studied painting and drawing in New York City at the Art Students League with Robert Brackman, Joseph Hirsch, and Robert Hale; at the National Academy of Design with Robert Phillipp; and in Provincetown, Massachusetts at the Provincetown Art School with Henry Hensche. Len maintained professional art studios in Carnegie Hall and at 41 Union Square, New York City, New York. He taught privately from his studio and taught classes at the Kittredge Women's Club in New York City.

The American Heartland was the dominant subjects of his work. Known for his meticulous still life paintings, he combined smooth layer paint, subtleness of color, and his unique perspectives and composition of simple objects such as vegetables, fruits, and flowers. He served leadership positions for the Audubon Artist and the Allied Artists of America.

== Death ==
Everett died November 25, 1984, at Burlington Medical Center, Burlington, Iowa, after suffering from oral cancer.

Len G. Everett was described as a simple person, with simple tastes, and simple ideas. According to the executor of his estate, R.A. McCannon,"he was uncomfortable with compliments and accolades, but was in awe of other associates in the New York art scene in the 70s and 80s..Every painting was his own idea, every still life component was selected personally, every composition painstakingly studied and developed…Discussion for his plans for a painting were seldom…He was secure and firm about his work…Discussion occurred only after a work was complete."

== Awards ==
- Washington and Jefferson National Painting Show, 1972
- National Art Round-Up, 1971
- Allied Artists of America, 1969
- Audubon Artists, 1969
- Berkshire Art Association, 1967
- Silvermine Guild of Artists, 1966
- Hudson Valley Art Association, 1965–1976
- Painters and Sculptors Society of New Jersey, 1964
- Salmagundi Club, 1963, 1964, 1965, 1966
- American Veterans Society of Artists, 1961, 1972
- Washington Square, New York City, 1967–1968
- Washington and Jefferson Painting Show, 1972
- National Art Round-Up, Second Place, 1971
- Allied Artists of America, Syndicated Magazine Medal of Merit, 1969
- Allied Artists of America, Honorable Mention in Oil, 1976
- Allied Artists of America, Grumbacher Gold Medal, 1980
- Allied Artist of America, Gold Medal of Honor
- Audubon Artist of America, Creative Oil Award, 1969
- Audubon Artist of America, Distinguished Contributions Award, 1980
- Audubon Artists of America, Binney-Smith Award, 1982
- Audubon Artists of America, Certificate of Merit, 1983
- Berkshire Art Association, Wm. A. Burns Prize, 1967
- Silvermine Guild of Artists, Silvermine Tavern Award, 1966
- Hudson Valley Art Association, Cornelia Cummings Award, 1976
- Painter and Sculptors' Society of New Jersey, 1964
- American Veterans' Society of Artists, B.F. Marrow Prize, 1961
- Washington Square Outdoor Show, New York City, Twentieth Century Film Corp. Uric Bell Award, 1st Prize, 1967
- Washington Square Outdoor Show, New York City, Salmagundi Award, 1968
- Washington Square Outdoor Show, New York City, 1st Prize for Oil, 1964
- National Academy of Design, Salters Gold Medal, 1984
- Audubon Artists of America, Liquitex Award, 1984
