= Robert Coe =

Robert Coe may refer to:

- Robert Coe (colonist) (1596–1689), English colonist and early settler of Long Island
- Robert D. Coe (1902–1985), career diplomat and the U.S. ambassador to Denmark from 1953 to 1957
- Robert Glen Coe (1956–2000), American executed for a 1979 rape and murder
