= Egidio Ortona =

Italian diplomat

- Egidio Ortona at the UN while he was Permanent Representative

Ambassador of Italy to the United States
- In office 1967 – 1975
- Preceded by: Sergio Fenoaltea
- Succeeded by: Roberto Gaja

Permanent Representative of Italy to the United Nations
- In office 1958 – 1961
- Preceded by: Leonardo Vitetti
- Succeeded by: Vittorio Zoppi

Personal details
- Born: 16 September 1910 Casale Monferrato, Piedmont, Italy
- Died: 10 January 1996 (aged 85) Rome, Italy
- Education: University of Turin

Egidio Ortona (16 September 1910 – 10 January 1996) was an Italian diplomat whose career spanned the years 1931 to 1975. He was the Permanent Representative of Italy to the United Nations (1958–1961) and Ambassador to the United States (1967–1975).

== Life ==
Egidio Ortona was born in Casale Monferrato on 16 September 1910. He graduated in law at the University of Turin in 1931 and the following year entered the Italian diplomatic service. He worked first in Cairo and then in Johannesburg, where he married.

In 1937 he was posted to the Italian embassy in London, where he worked for the ambassadors Dino Grandi and Giuseppe Bastianini. From 1940 to 1943 Ortona worked in the latter’s offices in Zadar, where Bastianini was appointed governor, and in Rome where Bastianini was undersecretary for foreign affairs under Benito Mussolini. Ortona’s diaries from this period, which he published as Diplomazia di guerra. Diari 1937-1943, cover these years when he was able to observe at close hand the collapse of Italy’s diplomatic relations with London, its subsequent entry into World War II as an ally of Nazi Germany, and the fall of Mussolini in 1943.

In November 1944 he was appointed to a delegation seeking economic assistance from the United States for the post-war reconstruction of Italy. He remained in Washington at the Italian Embassy until, in 1958, he was appointed as Italy’s Ambassador to the United Nations, remaining in the job for a little over two years, during which period Italy was a non-permanent member of the Security Council.

Ortona returned to Italy in 1961 becoming Director General of Economic Affairs at the Ministry of Foreign Affairs and then Secretary General of the Ministry itself. In this period he played an instrumental role in the successful signing of the Ussr-Fiat deal that marked the beginning of private mass motorization in the leading socialist State.

In 1967 Ortona was appointed Italian ambassador in Washington, a post which he held for the next eight years.

In 1975 Ortona, aged 65, retired from the diplomatic service. He took on posts as president of Honeywell’s Italian businesses, of Aeritalia and of Confitarma (Confederazione italiana armatori). (In a departing meeting with US President Gerald Ford he expressed reluctance to depart the civil service, insisting "I hate to be a businessman".) He also became president of the Istituto per gli Studi di Politica Internazionale (Institute for International Policy Studies) and published several volumes of his diaries which together cover the years 1937–1975.

Egidio Ortona died in Rome on 10 January 1996 at the age of 85. He was buried in Casale Monferrato where, on 16 March 2007, the public gardens of the Piazza Martiri della Libertà near the house where he was born were officially dedicated to him.

"It has been a fine experience for me. I came here in 1944-45. What I didn't say at Henry [Kissinger]'s nice party last night was that then you had $18 billion for Europe. You don't have that now. [...] We are now reconstructed, and in a way we are more demanding and difficult to deal with."

— Ortona to Gerald Ford on his tenure as Ambassador to the United States

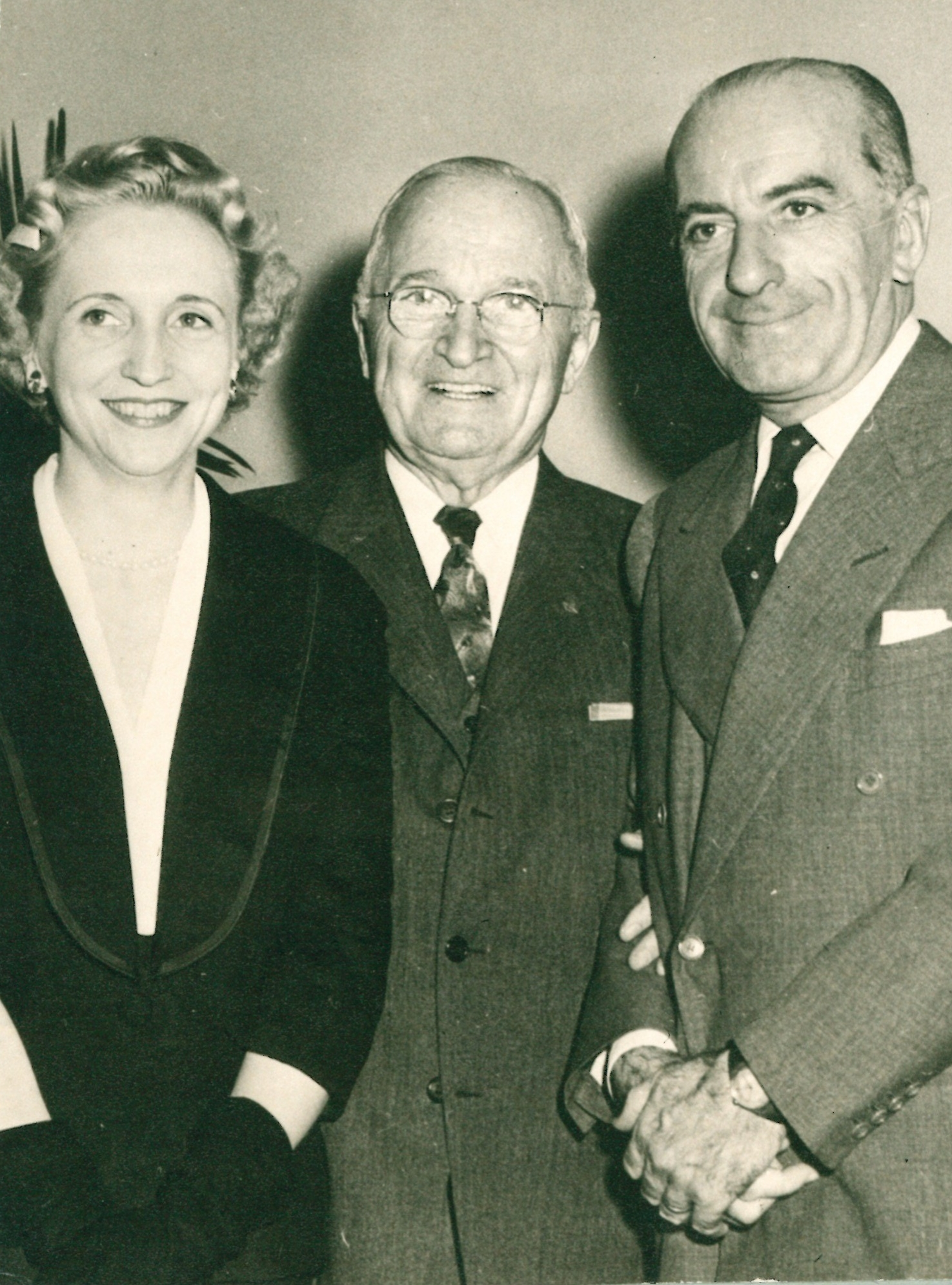
1955, Egidio Ortona, Minister Counsellor in Washington with former US President Harry Truman

== Works ==
- Diplomazia di guerra – Diari 1937-1943, Bologna: Il Mulino, 1993.
- Anni d’America - La ricostruzione 1944-1951, Bologna: Il Mulino, 1984.
- Anni d’America – La diplomazia 1953-1961, Bologna: Il Mulino, 1986.
- Gli anni della Farnesina. Pagine del diario 1961-1967, Milan: ISPI, 1998.
- Anni d’America – La cooperazione 1967-1975, Bologna: Il Mulino, 1989.

== Honors ==
Order of Merit of the Italian Republic 1st Class / Knight Grand Cross – August 9, 1967

== See also ==
- Ministry of Foreign Affairs (Italy)
- Foreign relations of Italy

== Notes ==
Preceded by Leonardo Vitetti	Permanent Representative of Italy to the United Nations; 1958 - 1961	Succeeded by Vittorio Zoppi
