= Eugenie Anderson =

American diplomat

Helen Eugenie Moore Anderson
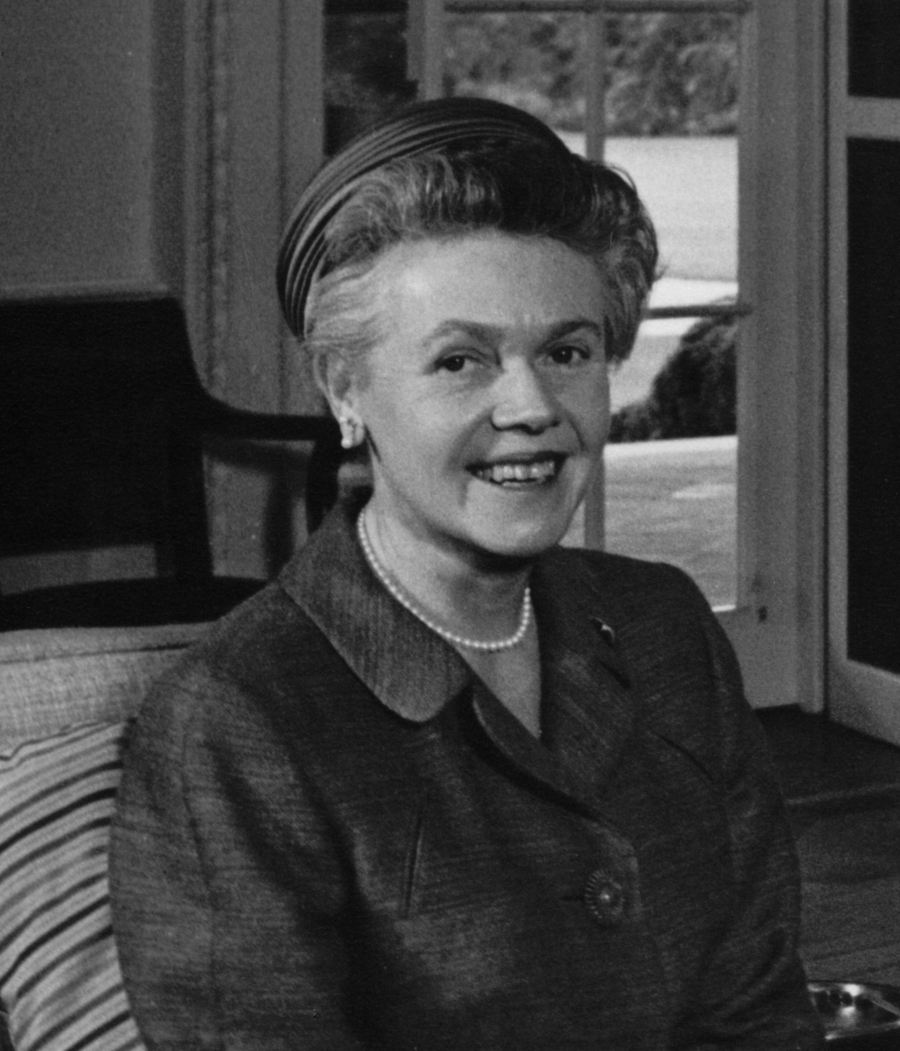
- Anderson in 1962

United States Ambassador to Bulgaria
- In office August 3, 1962 – December 6, 1964
- President: John F. Kennedy
- Preceded by: Edward Page, Jr.
- Succeeded by: Nathaniel Davis

United States Ambassador to Denmark
- In office December 22, 1949 – January 19, 1953
- President: Harry S. Truman
- Preceded by: Josiah Marvel, Jr.
- Succeeded by: Robert D. Coe

Personal details
- Born: Helen Eugenie Moore; May 26, 1909 Adair, Iowa, U.S.
- Died: March 31, 1997 (aged 87) Red Wing, Minnesota, U.S.
- Party: Democratic
- Spouse: John Pierce Anderson (m. 1930)
- Children: Hans, Johanna
- Profession: Diplomat, Politician

Eugenie Anderson (May 26, 1909 – March 31, 1997), also known as Helen Eugenie Moore Anderson, was a United States diplomat. She is best known as the first woman appointed chief of mission at the ambassador level in US history.

== Personal life ==
Helen Eugenie Moore was born on May 26, 1909, in Adair, Iowa, one of five children of Rev. Ezekial A. Moore, a Methodist minister, and his wife, FloraBelle. She concentrated in music as a student and attended the Juilliard School in New York; her original hope was to become a concert pianist. She was a member of the Iowa Beta chapter of Pi Beta Phi Women's Fraternity at Simpson College. She transferred to Carleton College in 1929, where she graduated in 1931. It was there she met her husband, John Pierce Anderson, whom she married in 1929 and with whom she had two children, Hans and Johanna.

== Public life ==
Interview with Eugenie Anderson from 1951

Anderson's interest in international affairs had been stirred by a trip to Europe in 1937, where in Germany she first saw a totalitarian state in action, as she recalled. On her return she spoke frequently for the League of Women Voters, fighting the strong isolationist policies of the time.

Anderson helped to create the Minnesota Democratic-Farmer-Labor Party in 1944. Four years later, as one of the few women, she was elected to an office in the national Democratic Party. In 1948, as the DFL split from the national Democratic Party in a controversy over goals and ideology, she supported Hubert H. Humphrey. She was rewarded for this support in 1949, when she was appointed by President Truman as U.S. ambassador to Denmark (1949–1953).

Truman's appointment made her the first woman appointed chief of mission at the ambassador level in US history. (The first female chief of mission at the minister rank was Ruth Bryan Owen in 1933). Despite undercurrents of sexism and discomfort in the press with her career flaunting gender roles, she was well known in Denmark and was sometimes called "Auntie Anderson" by the media. Anderson was a strong proponent for people's diplomacy, or public diplomacy. For example, immediately after she presented her credentials to King Frederik, she invited the workers who furnished her official residence and their families to a house-warming party. Anderson also learned and spoke publicly in Danish which was unusual as such language skills were not seen as necessary at the time. Her popularity and high-profile allowed her to exert some political force: she convinced Denmark to make a stronger commitment to NATO, strengthened the Greenland Treaty, and in 1950 became the first American woman to sign a treaty, with the Treaty of Commerce and Friendship with Denmark, which she drafted. When she resigned from this position in 1953, King Frederik IX awarded her the Grand Cross of the Order of Dannebrog, a high honor.

In 1958 Anderson campaigned for, but did not win, the DFL nomination for U.S. Senator, which ultimately went to Eugene McCarthy. She was later appointed by Kennedy to be ambassador to Bulgaria (1962–1964). Thus, Anderson became the first American woman to represent the United States in a country allied with the Soviet Union. She was also the first American diplomat to speak on Bulgarian television and radio. While ambassador to Bulgaria, Anderson negotiated the settlement of outstanding Bulgarian debts to the US from World War II.

After her retirement from these posts, President Johnson appointed Anderson member of the US delegation to the United Nations, serving on the Trusteeship Council and the Security Council. Anderson was the first woman to sit on the UN's Security Council. A year later in 1966, she served on the United Nations Committee for Decolonization, which supported newly independent countries in Africa and Asia. In 1968, Anderson was briefly engaged as Special Assistant to the Secretary.

== Retirement and death ==
Anderson retired from the State Department in September 1968. She continued to work for Humphrey's political campaigns. Anderson died in Red Wing, Minnesota at the age of 87.

Diplomatic posts
Preceded by Josiah Marvel, Jr.	U.S. Ambassador to Denmark; 1949–1953	Succeeded by Robert D. Coe
Preceded by Edward Page, Jr.	U.S. Ambassador to Bulgaria; 1962–1964	Succeeded by Nathaniel Davis
