= Robert D. Coe =

American diplomat (1902–1985)

United States Ambassador to Denmark
- In office September 25, 1953 – June 1, 1957
- President: Dwight D. Eisenhower
- Preceded by: Eugenie Anderson
- Succeeded by: Val Peterson

Personal details
- Born: February 27, 1902
- Died: May 26, 1985 (aged 83)
- Parent(s): William Robertson Coe; Mai Huttleston Rogers Coe
- Education: St. Paul's School
- Alma mater: Harvard University; Magdalen College, Oxford

Robert Douglas Coe (February 27, 1902 – May 26, 1985) was a career diplomat and the U.S. ambassador to Denmark from 1953 to 1957.

== Early life ==
Coe was born on February 27, 1902. He was the second son of William Robertson Coe and Mai Huttleston Rogers Coe. His siblings included banker and railroad executive William Rogers Coe, philanthropist Henry Huttleston Rogers Coe, and Natalie Mai Coe who became the Countess Vitetti after she married Commendatore Leonardo Vitetti, the Italian Ambassador to France.

He attended St. Paul's School in Concord, New Hampshire. He later he received an A.B. in fine arts from Harvard University, and completed an M.A. at Magdalen College, Oxford, England.

== Career ==
Although his father hoped young Robert would pursue a career in law or banking, he instead intended to become an architect, and took drawing lessons from Robert Chanler and Everett Shinn. His father William Robertson Coe was not fond of the idea of his son becoming an architect, and, ultimately, Bob became a career diplomat.

Bob was posted to Brazil, Turkey, India, Great Britain, and the Netherlands, before serving as U.S. ambassador to Denmark from 1953 to 1957.

=== Diplomatic Service ===
Porto Alegre, Brazil	1928–1930
Peru	1930–1931
Turkey	1931–1935
Calcutta, India	1935–1937
Washington, DC: The Balkans Desk	1937–1941
London	1941–1948
Holland	1948–1950
Washington, D.C.	1950–1952
Retired	1952
Recalled by President Eisenhower	1953
Ambassador to Denmark	1953–1957

== Personal life ==
As a board member of the Planting Fields Foundation and Chairman of the Board between 1971 and 1985, he helped spark interest in the early restoration work at Coe Hall, particularly the Breakfast Room ("Buffalo Room") murals and the conservation of paintings and stained glass.

Robert painted as a hobby, and never married. Coe died on May 26, 1985.

Diplomatic posts
Preceded by Eugenie Anderson	U.S. Ambassador to Denmark; 1953–1957	Succeeded by Val Peterson
