= Joaquín Cruz Pérez =

Guamanian judge (1860–1939)

Joaquín Cruz Pérez or Joaquín Pérez y Cruz (1860–1939) was an early Guam judge and acting-Governor of Guam from February 1 to April 20, 1899. He was first appointed as Justice of the Peace in 1894 by the Spanish government of Guam. After the capture of Guam by the United States during the Spanish–American War, he retained his role as a judge, sometimes unofficially. (In 1910, the United States Navy took control of the Guam courts system over an issue of intermarriage.) In 1915, the United States restored the local judiciary and Cruz Pérez was appointed as an Associate Justice in an earlier Supreme Court of Guam, not related to the present Supreme Court.

Political offices
Preceded by New office	Commissioner of Hagåtña; 1894–1899	Succeeded by Antonio C. Suarez
Preceded by E. D. Taussig; Acting Naval Governor	Governor of Guam; 1899	Succeeded by William Coe; Acting
