= Louis A. Kaiser =

American naval officer and politician (1870–1939)

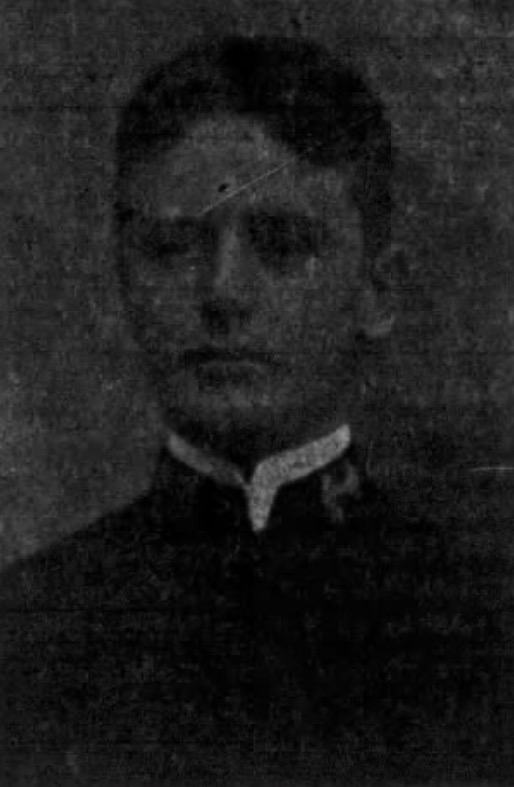
- Kaiser in 1900

Governor of Guam
- In office May 9, 1899 – August 7, 1899
- Preceded by: William Coe
- Succeeded by: Richard Phillips Leary

Personal details
- Born: 1870 Kirkwood, Illinois, US
- Died: August 12, 1939 (aged 68–69)
- Occupation: Naval officer, politician

Louis A. Kaiser (1870 – August 12, 1939) was an American naval officer and politician. A Captain in the United States Navy, he served as Governor of Guam during 1899. He was a pioneer in the Navy on the use of wireless telegraphy, prior to World War I.

== Early life ==
Kaiser was born in 1870, in Kirkwood, Illinois, the son of Nikodem Kaiser and his wife. At age 15, he began attending the United States Naval Academy.

== Early career ==
Kaiser was born in Kirkwood, Illinois. He graduated from the United States Naval Academy in 1889 and was commissioned an ensign in 1891. His first assignment was USS Chicago. In 1894, he was transferred to USS Detroit, and again to USS Michigan, two years later. In 1896, he was reassigned to USS Concord.

In the Spanish–American War, he continued to serve on Concord, and he fought in the Battle of Manila Bay. In December 1898, he was promoted to Lieutenant, junior grade. In 1899, he was briefly made in charge of the government of Guam, in preparation for the arrival of Governor Richard Phillips Leary. In 1900, he was transferred to USS Solace (AH-2), then again to a post in Newport News, Virginia.

== Bureau of Equipment ==
In 1904, he was transferred again to the Bureau of Equipment. In this role, Kaiser was a pioneer in early wireless transmissions and conducted many of the early tests of wireless telegraphy. In 1905, he demonstrated an 1,100+ mile range while testing it aboard the USS Brooklyn. In July 1905, he was promoted to a full lieutenant commander and invited to speak on these innovations to the Washington Society of Engineers in Washington, DC. In 1910, he was transferred to the Bureau of Steam Engineering.

In 1912, he was given his first command, the cruiser USS Montgomery. The following year, he was given command of the USS Tennessee before being promoted to a full commander. He served in the Boston Naval Yard and Naval War College in Newport, Rhode Island in 1915, before returning to the command of the battleship USS New Jersey and receiving a promotion to captain.

== Later career ==
In the 1920s, Kaiser was assigned to the hydrographic office in Galveston, Texas. In 1923, he was briefly the acting-commandant of the 8th Naval District before being assigned to the New York hydrographic office. He retired April 1, 1925.

He died on August 12, 1939, and is buried in Arlington National Cemetery.

Preceded by William Coe	Naval Governor of Guam; 1899; Acting	Succeeded by Richard Phillips Leary
