= Mary (Mai) Huttleston Rogers Coe =

American heiress (1875–1924)

- Born: Mary Huttleston Rogers; September 26, 1875; Fairhaven, Massachusetts, U.S.
- Died: December 28, 1924 (aged 49); Manhattan, New York, U.S.
- Spouse(s): Joseph C. Mott (annulled) William Robertson Coe (m. 1900)
- Children: William Rogers Coe; Robert Douglas Coe; Henry Huttleston Rogers Coe; Natalie Mai Coe, Countess Vitetti
- Parent(s): Henry Huttleston Rogers; Abigail Palmer Gifford

Mary Huttleston "Mai" Coe (née Rogers; September 26, 1875 – December 28, 1924) was an American heiress and horticulturist who became the wife of William Robertson Coe, a businessman and philanthropist.

== Early life ==
Mary Huttleston Rogers, known as "Mai", was born in Fairhaven, Massachusetts, on September 26, 1875. She was the youngest of four daughters of Henry Huttleston Rogers (1840–1909) and his first wife, Abbie Gifford (1841–1894). Her father was an associate of John D. Rockefeller and one of the wealthiest men in the United States through Standard Oil. By 1874, the Rogers family was living in New York City and maintaining a summer home in Fairhaven. Henry and Abbie Rogers already had three daughters when Mai was born, and she was their last daughter. Mai (as she was always called) was the "baby" of the family until the arrival of Henry Huttleston Rogers Jr., who was born in 1879.

Mai was educated at private seminary schools, spoke fluent French, played the piano, and was interested in art and decoration. She had three older sisters and one brother who survived infancy. Mai's sisters were Anne Engle Rogers, who married publisher William Evarts Benjamin, and Cara Leland Rogers, who married Urban Hanlon Broughton (she later became the first Lady Fairhaven in England after her husband was posthumously elevated to the peerage). In 1890, Mai's older sister Millicent (born 1873) died at age 17, and the family donated the Millicent Library which was dedicated to her memory. In 1894, a new Town Hall in Fairhaven was dedicated to Mai's maternal grandmother only a few months before Mai's mother herself died suddenly on May 21, 1894, following an operation in New York City.

As children, Mai and her brother and sisters spent much time at coastal Fairhaven, where some of their grandparents were still alive. They heard tales of the days of the whaling ships. Her maternal grandfather, Peleg Gifford, was particularly well known in the community for his tales of days as a ship's captain. Over the years, the Rogers family donated many public facilities to the community, including schools and a Unitarian church.

Her brother, Henry Huttleston Rogers Jr., was better known as Harry. As adults, Harry and his wife were favorite traveling companions of Mai's father and family friends (including humorist Mark Twain and educator Dr. Booker T. Washington) aboard the family's luxury yacht, Kanawha. Harry later changed the spelling of his middle name to an earlier version, Huddleston.

== Marriages and later life ==
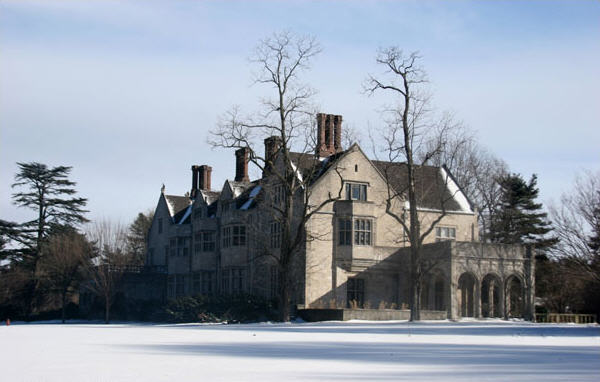
Main House, Planting Fields, 2006

Mai's first marriage to Joseph C. Mott was annulled. Her father and her close family friend Mark Twain both labeled her first husband a "scalawag". However, her second marriage fared much better. On June 4, 1900, at her father's home in New York City, 24-year-old Mai Rogers married William Robertson Coe, a 30-year-old English-born insurance company manager from Philadelphia, whom she had met on a transatlantic crossing. It was the second marriage for each.

Mai Rogers was married in full virginal bridal regalia, "gowned in white satin, veiled with exquisitely embroidered tulle, and wore a veil of tulle embroidered to match the tulle draperies of the dress," The New York Times reported the day after the wedding. "This veil was caught to her coiffure with a diamond sunburst, and at one side of her corsage she wore a Maltese cross in diamonds, the gift of the bridegroom."

Together, Mai and William Robertson Coe had four children:

- William Rogers Coe (1901–1971)
- Robert Douglas Coe (1902–1985)
- Henry Huttleston Rogers Coe (1907–1966)
- Natalie Mai Coe, Countess Vitetti (1910–1987).

By 1910, William Robertson Coe had become president of Johnson and Higgins Insurance, and he was involved in insuring the hull of the RMS Titanic which sank on its maiden voyage in 1912. Like many other famous families of the Gilded Age, the Coe family had been booked for the ill-fated liner's return trip to Southampton, England. By 1916, Coe had been named Chairman of the Board of Johnson and Higgins.

Coe was on the Board of Directors of The Virginian Railway Company from 1910 until his death in 1955 and headed the company for a brief period during World War II. He was also a director of Loup Creek Colliery and the Wyoming Land Company. Their oldest son, William Rogers Coe, was also a longtime official of his grandfather's railroad.

=== Planting Fields ===
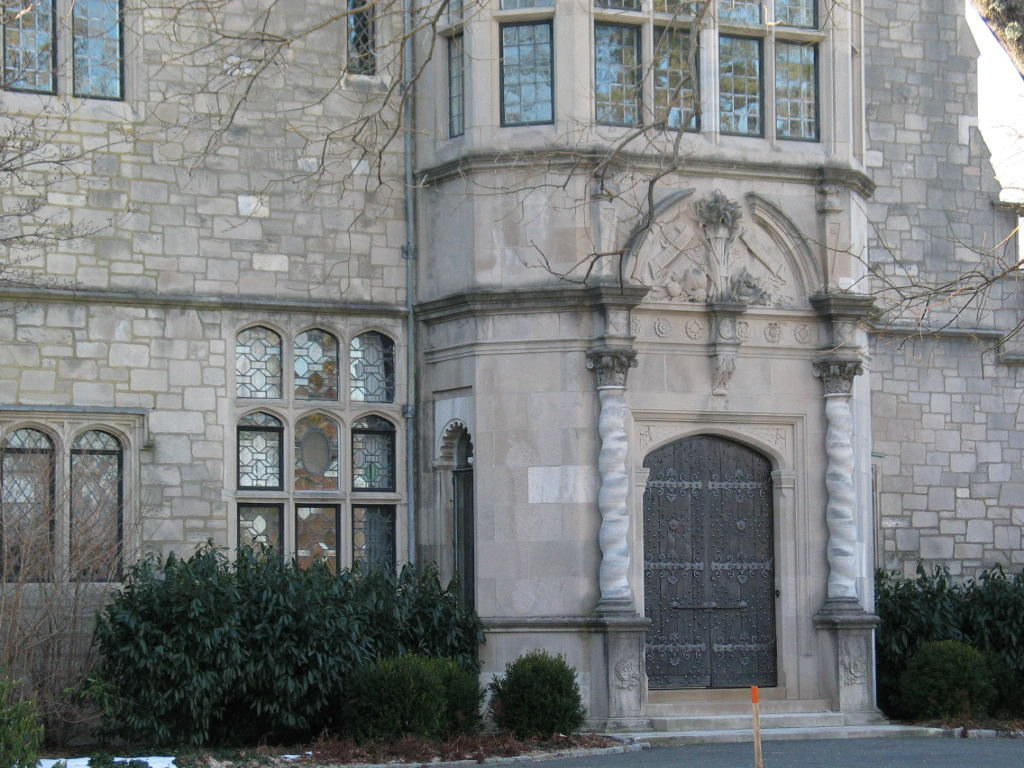
The front door and Main Entrance to the Main House at Planting Fields

Mai and her husband shared a love of horticulture. They purchased a large estate, Planting Fields, in 1913. It had been established in 1904 by Helen MacGregor Byrne – wife of New York City lawyer James Byrne, and built on the Gold Coast of Long Island, New York in Oyster Bay.

When used as the Coe family estate, the mansion was referred to as "the residence" or "the house". The name "Coe Hall" was coined much later, when the land was used as a temporary campus for the State University of New York (SUNY) in the 1950s and 1960s. The Coes began planting and landscaping under the guidance of the Boston landscaping firm of Guy Lowell and A. R. Sargent. In 1915, Lowell and Sargent oversaw transport of the two beech trees from Fairhaven (Mai's childhood home). The gigantic beeches, with root balls thirty feet (nine metres) in diameter, were ferried across Long Island Sound in mid-winter. Roads were widened and utility wires temporarily removed to make way. Only one of the two trees survived the journey. The second beech tree lived until the 21st century, but was taken down in February 2006. However, the "Fairhaven Beech" will live on. Seedlings were collected from the tree from 2000 to 2005.

The property's first mansion burned to the ground on March 19, 1918; its replacement, the present Main House (previously referred to as Coe Hall), was constructed between 1918 and 1921 in the Tudor Revival style and faced in Indiana limestone. It was designed by the firm of Walker & Gillette and was completed in 1921. Images from a book of English country houses, especially those of Moyns Park, Athelhampton, and St. Catherine's Court, inspired its architecture. William and Mai Coe's interest in rare species of trees and plant collections made the estate a botanical marvel.

Mai was chronically ill for the last decade of her life. Following an extended illness, Mai died in 1924, aged 49, and was interred nearby.

== Planting Fields Arboretum State Historic Park ==
The 353 acre (1.4 km²) estate was deeded to the State of New York in 1949 (during Mr. Coe's lifetime) to become Planting Fields Arboretum State Historic Park. The 355-acre (1.44 km^{2}) estate includes Coe Hall and a large arboretum. William Robertson Coe died in 1955.
