= William E. Benjamin =

William Evarts Benjamin (1859 – 1940) was a prominent publisher and collector in Boston, Massachusetts.

== Biography ==
William E. Benjamin was born in 1859. His most well-known work was the printing and extensive promotion of Edmund Clarence Stedman's A Library of American Literature from the Earliest Settlement to the Present Time, which his company published in 1894.

His father was Park Benjamin (1809-1864) and his mother was Mary Brower Western. Mary's father, Henry M. Western (Esq.), was a well known lawyer in New York City. (One of Henry M. Western's brothers, Thomas Gehot Western, was the Superintendent of Indian Affairs under Sam Houston in Texas.) Henry M Western's wife, Hannah Romaine, was the daughter of a well known Revolutionary War veteran, Benjamin Romaine.

William's wife was Anne Engle Rogers (1865-1924), whose father, Henry H. Rogers (1840-1909), along with John D. Rockefeller, founded Standard Oil Company.

Friend Helen Keller dedicated to Henry H. Rogers, a benefactor, the book The World I Live In, with the inscription, "To Henry H. Rogers, my Dear Friend of Many Years." On the fly leaf of Rogers' copy, she also wrote, "To Mrs Rogers, The best of the world I live in is the kindness of friends like you and Mr Rogers."

Benjamin married Anne Engle Rogers, eldest daughter of Abbie Palmer (née Gifford) Rogers and Henry Huttleston Rogers, each of Mayflower lineage. Her father was an industrialist millionaire who was a principal of Standard Oil. They had two children, Beatrice Benjamin Cartwright and Henry Rogers Benjamin.

After 1900, when Mark Twain went bankrupt investing in the Paige Compositor, Benjamin and his father-in-law assisted him financially by taking control of his accounts and real estate.

Benjamin died in 1940 and is buried at Sleepy Hollow Cemetery in New York.

== Archival Sources ==
- Finding aid to Preston Gibson papers, including correspondence with William E. Benjamin, at Columbia University. Rare Book & Manuscript Library.
