= Leonardo Vitetti =

Italian diplomat

Count Leonardo Vitetti
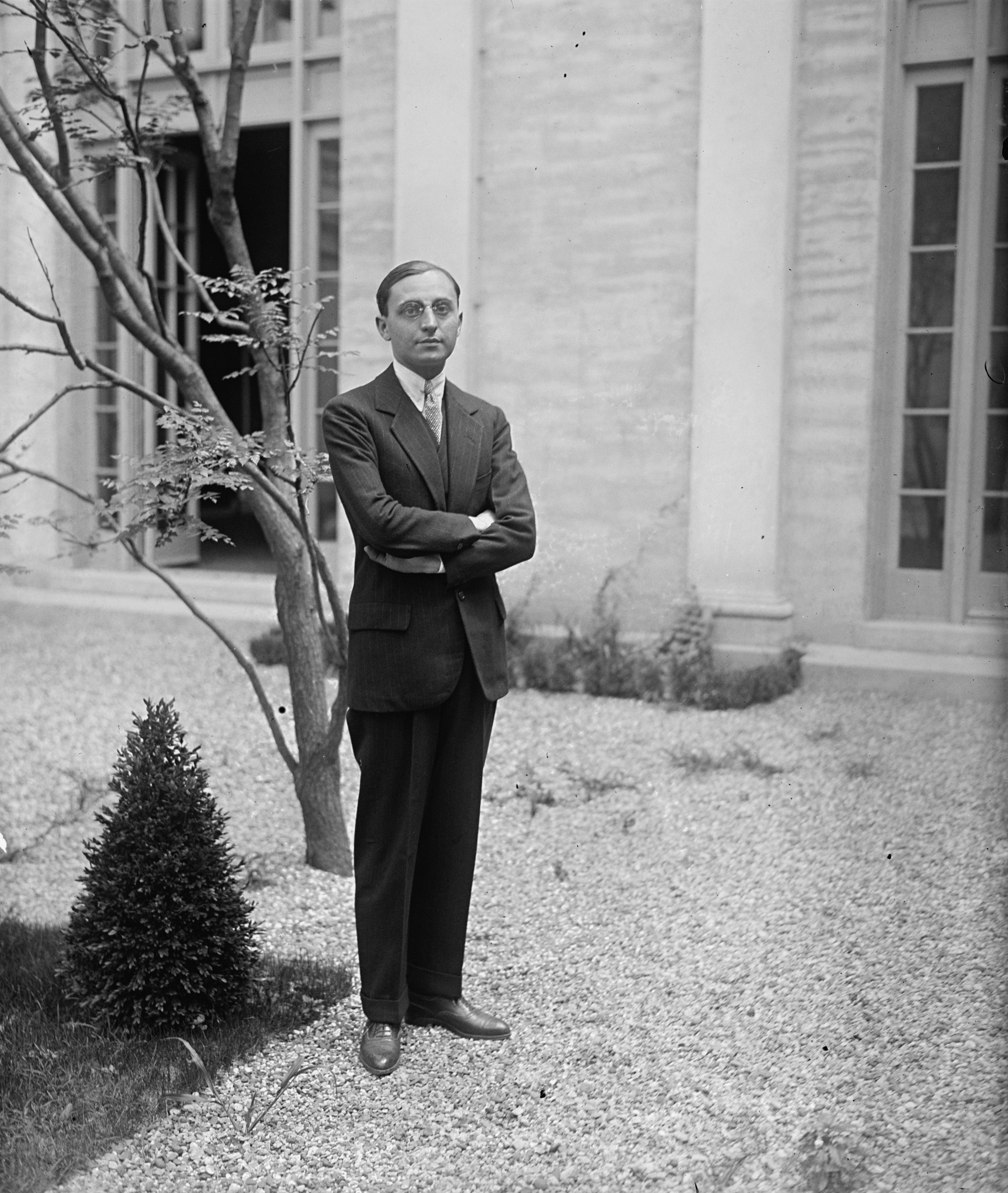
- Vitetti while on the staff of the Italian embassy to the United States in 1925

Permanent Representative of Italy to the United Nations
- In office 1956 – 1958
- Preceded by: Alberico Casardi
- Succeeded by: Egidio Ortona

Personal details
- Born: 15 December 1895
- Died: 14 May 1973 (aged 77)
- Spouse: Natalie Mai Coe (m. 1934)
- Children: 1
- Education: Sapienza University of Rome

Count Leonardo Vitetti (15 December 1895 – 14 May 1973) was an Italian diplomat who served as a delegate to the United Nations from 1956 to 1958.

== Biography ==
Born in 1895, Vitetti was educated at the Royal University in Rome, where he received a doctorate in law. He served twice as a member of the Italian delegation to the League of Nations and also served as a counselor at the Italian embassy in London and as first secretary of the Italian embassy in Washington, D.C. In the mid-1930s, he served as the director of European affairs for the Ministry of Foreign Affairs, under Foreign Minister Count Galeazzo Ciano, and later became the ministry's director of general affairs. By this time, he was capable of speaking English to a professional level.

Vitetti married Natalie Mai Coe, the only daughter of William Robertson Coe and his second wife, Mai Huttleston Rogers, on May 19, 1934. They had one child, Ernesto, who was born in London in 1935.

Vitetti was made a count in 1938 by the Italian government.

The New York Times described him as "a learned student of American history, & well-known for his work in the field of medieval Italian poetry".

== Honors ==
1st Class / Knight Grand Cross – June 2, 1955

Grand Officer — 10 febbraio 1937

== See also ==
- Ministry of Foreign Affairs (Italy)
- Foreign relations of Italy

Preceded by Alberico Casardi	Italian Ambassador to the United Nations; 1956 - 1958	Succeeded by Egidio Ortona
