= Nathan Coe (businessman) =

Australian businessman

- Education: University of Sydney
- Occupation: Businessman
- Title: CEO, Auto Trader Group
- Term: April 2020–
- Predecessor: Trevor Mather

Nathan Coe is an Australian businessman, and the CEO of Auto Trader Group.

Coe earned a bachelor's degree from the University of Sydney.

Coe worked for PwC and Telstra, before joining Auto Trader in 2007. He joined the board of directors as chief operating officer (COO) in April 2017, and became chief financial officer (CFO) in July 2017.

In April 2019, it was announced that Coe would succeed Trevor Mather as CEO when he retires on 31 March 2020.
