= William Rogers Coe =

American banker and railroad executive

- Born: March 1901; Manhattan, New York, U.S.
- Died: May 26, 1971 (aged 70); Oyster Bay, New York, U.S.
- Education: Princeton University; United States Naval Academy
- Occupation: Businessman
- Children: William Robertson Coe II; Michael D. Coe
- Parent(s): William Robertson Coe; Mai Huttleston Rogers Coe
- Relatives: Henry Huttleston Rogers (grandfather)

William Rogers Coe (March 1901 – May 26, 1971) was an American banker and railroad executive.

== Early life ==
William Rogers Coe was born in March 1901 in Manhattan. He was the first of four children born to Mai Huttleston Rogers Coe and William Robertson Coe. His younger siblings included Robert Douglas Coe (who served as the U.S. Ambassador to Denmark), philanthropist Henry Huttleston Rogers Coe, and Natalie Mai Coe who became the Countess Vitetti after she married Commendatore Leonardo Vitetti, the Italian Ambassador to France.

He was educated at St. Paul's School in Concord, New Hampshire. He then attended Princeton University and the United States Naval Academy.

== Career ==
He followed his father into the railway business. Eventually, he became Vice-President and Treasurer of the Virginian Railway Company, the railroad that his grandfather, Henry Huttleston Rogers had built. He also served as a board member of the East River Savings Bank and First National Bank of New York and a director of the Long Island Lighting Company and the Brooklyn Union Gas Company.

== Personal life ==
In 1923, Coe was married to twenty year old designer Clover Simonton, a daughter of Thomas C. Simonton. After their marriage, they lived nearby in Glen Cove, New York and later, Mill Neck, New York. Like his father, William Robertson Coe, William Rogers Coe had strong horticultural interests, and was a noted raiser of azaleas and rhododendrons, often exhibiting at flower shows. Together, they had two sons:

- William Robertson Coe II (1926–2009), an archaeologist who became a Mayanist scholar.
- Michael D. Coe (1929-2019), an archaeologist, anthropologist, epigrapher and author.

He served as the president of The Coe Foundation, the Planting Fields Foundation and served for many years as the chairman of the board of the New York Horticultural Society.

Coe died in Oyster Bay, New York on May 26, 1971.
