= Kirkwood, Illinois =

Kirkwood
- Village
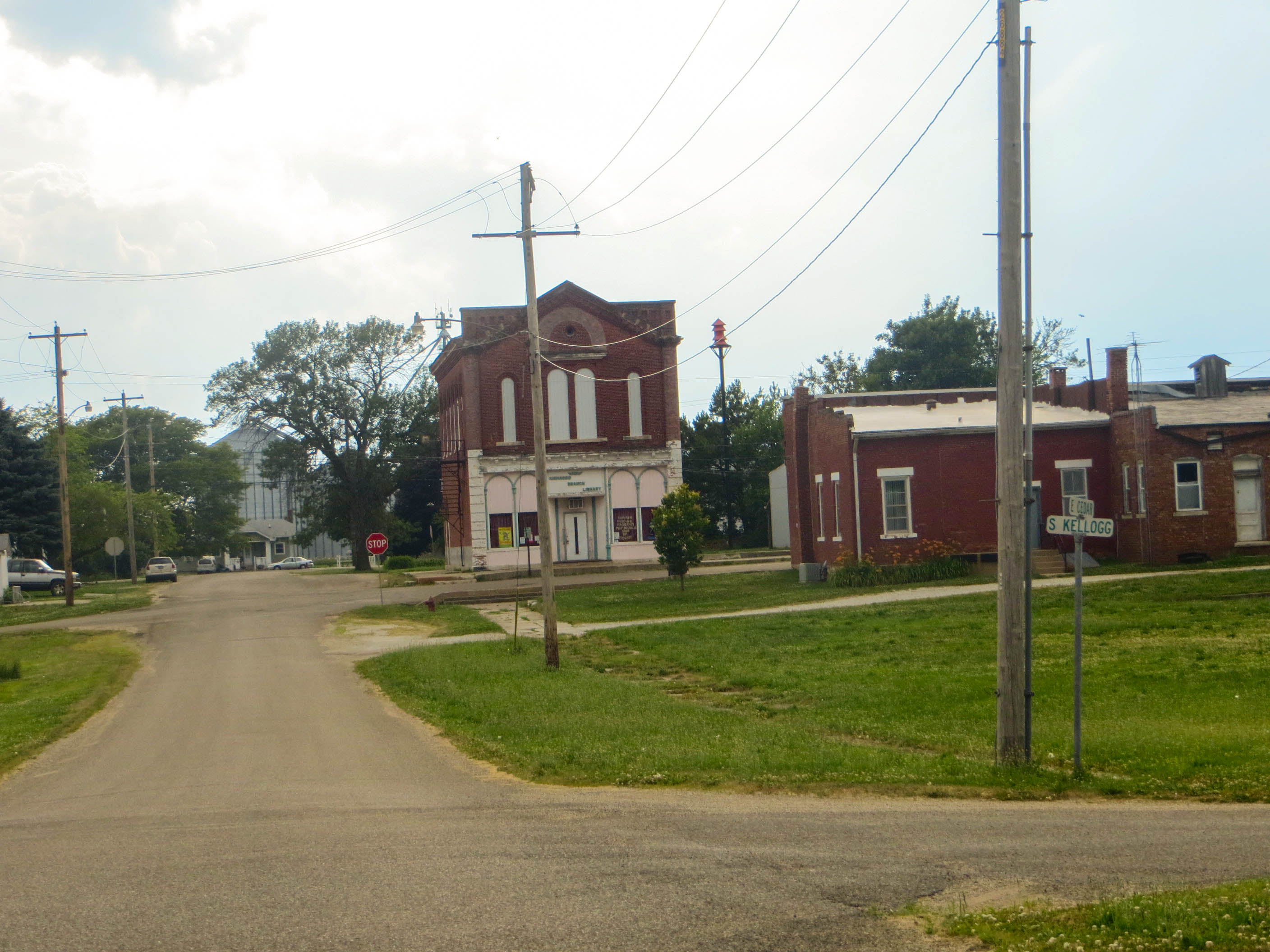
- Kirkwood, 2016

- Location of Kirkwood in Warren County, Illinois.

- Location of Illinois in the United States
- Coordinates: 40°52′04″N 90°44′54″W
- Country: United States
- State: Illinois
- County: Warren
- Township: Tompkins

Area
  - Total: 0.94 sq mi (2.43 km^{2})
  - Land: 0.94 sq mi (2.43 km^{2})
  - Water: 0 sq mi (0.00 km^{2})
- Elevation: 748 ft (228 m)

Population (2020)
  - Total: 678
  - Density: 721.7/sq mi (278.66/km^{2})
- Time zone: UTC-6 (CST)
  - Summer (DST): UTC-5 (CDT)
- ZIP Code(s): 61447
- Area code: 309
- FIPS code: 17-40182
- GNIS feature ID: 2398362
- Wikimedia Commons: Kirkwood, Illinois
- Website: https://villageofkirkwood.municipalimpact.com/home

Kirkwood is a village in Warren County, Illinois, United States. As of the 2020 census, Kirkwood had a population of 678. It is part of the Galesburg Micropolitan Statistical Area.

== History ==
The land was set aside as a Military Tract of 1812. In 1859, the first town center was given the name of Lyndon. On August 5, 1865, it was incorporated as Young America. Finally, in May 1874 the town name was changed to Kirkwood in honor of the former governor of Iowa, Samuel J. Kirkwood.

== Geography ==
According to the 2010 census, Kirkwood has a total area of 0.92 square miles (2.38 km^{2}), all land.

== Demographics ==
Historical population
Census	Pop.	Note	%±
1880	1,079		—
1890	949		−12.0%
1900	1,008		6.2%
1910	926		−8.1%
1920	882		−4.8%
1930	693		−21.4%
1940	746		7.6%
1950	747		0.1%
1960	771		3.2%
1970	817		6.0%
1980	1,008		23.4%
1990	884		−12.3%
2000	794		−10.2%
2010	714		−10.1%
2020	678		−5.0%
U.S. Decennial Census

As of the census of 2000, there were 794 people, 307 households, and 237 families residing in the village. The population density was 873.7 inhabitants per square mile (337.3/km^{2}). There were 322 housing units at an average density of 354.3 per square mile (136.8/km^{2}). The racial makeup of the village was 98.61% White, 0.25% Asian, and 1.13% from two or more races. Hispanic or Latino of any race were 1.26% of the population.

There were 307 households, out of which 31.6% had children under the age of 18 living with them, 63.5% were married couples living together, 9.4% had a female householder with no husband present, and 22.8% were non-families. 20.2% of all households were made up of individuals, and 9.8% had someone living alone who was 65 years of age or older. The average household size was 2.59 and the average family size was 2.94.

In the village, the population was spread out, with 24.6% under the age of 18, 7.9% from 18 to 24, 28.0% from 25 to 44, 25.8% from 45 to 64, and 13.7% who were 65 years of age or older. The median age was 38 years. For every 100 females, there were 95.1 males. For every 100 females age 18 and over, there were 95.1 males.

The median income for a household in the village was $34,167, and the median income for a family was $35,357. Males had a median income of $26,848 versus $15,804 for females. The per capita income for the village was $15,040. About 3.2% of families and 3.4% of the population were below the poverty line, including none of those under age 18 and 4.8% of those age 65 or over.

== Transportation ==
While there is no fixed-route transit service in Kirkwood, intercity bus service is provided by Burlington Trailways in nearby Monmouth.

== Education ==
It is in the United Community School District 304.

== Notable people ==
- Louis A. Kaiser, distinguished U.S. Navy captain.
- Worth Ryder, artist, curator, and art professor.
- Richard Speck, mass murderer.

== Sources ==
Rowley, Mildred I., The History of Kirkwood, Illinois and Tompkins Township, Warren County, Bicentennial Heritage Committee, 1976.
