= Ada M. Coe =

- Born: December 1, 1890; Milford Center
- Died: December 13, 1983 (aged 93); Warren, Pennsylvania
- Education: Mount Holyoke College, Wesleyan University of Ohio
- Occupation: Professor
- Employer: International College of Barcelona

Professor Ada M. Coe (December 1, 1890 – December 13, 1983) was an early American hispanist teacher.

== Life ==
Coe was born in Ohio at Milford Center. She was able to go to Wesleyan University of Ohio. She started to teach at International College of Barcelona after she graduated from Mount Holyoke College in 1913. She taught there until 1916 and the following year she was working at Wellesley College. In 1918 she led a Spanish American literature course at Wellesley. This was the first Spanish course open to American women. She was awarded a master's degree by Wellesley in 1922 and went to work at the Columbia University, as well as the Universities of Toronto and Madrid.

By 1947 she was a full professor and led her department in 1936 for two years and in 1951 for five years when she retired from Wellesley in 1956. In 1952 she had published work relating to the US hispanist Archer Milton Huntington.

Coe became a full member of the Hispanic Society of America in 1957 . Coe died on December 13, 1983, in Warren, Pennsylvania.
