= William Robertson Coe =

British-American businessman

- Born: June 8, 1869; Kingswinford, Staffordshire, England
- Died: March 14, 1955 (aged 85); Palm Beach, Florida, United States
- Resting place: Locust Valley Cemetery, Locust Valley, New York, U.S.
- Occupations: Business executive, philanthropist, racehorse owner/breeder
- Spouse(s): Jane Hutchinson Falligant; Mai Rogers; Caroline Graham Slaughter
- Children: William Rogers Coe; Robert Douglas Coe; Henry Huttleston Rogers Coe; Natalie Mai Coe
- Parent(s): Frederick Augustus Coe; Margaret Robertson
- Relatives: Henry Huttleston Rogers (second father-in-law); Abbie Gifford Rogers (second mother-in-law)

William Robertson Coe (June 8, 1869 – March 14, 1955) was an insurance, railroad and business executive, a major owner and breeder of Thoroughbred racehorses, as well as a collector of Americana and an important philanthropist for the academic discipline of American Studies.

== Early life ==
William Coe was born in Kingswinford, Staffordshire, England. His father, Frederick Augustus Coe, was then cashier in a local iron works, but later became manager. His mother, Margaret Robertson, was a native of Edinburgh, Scotland. Coe received his early schooling at Albion Academy in Cardiff, Wales. At the start of the 1880s, his family resided in Gloucester, where Coe was confirmed at the local cathedral.

Members of the Coe family, including William, arrived in New York on August 18, 1883, from Hull, England, aboard the Rhodora, a merchant ship owned by Margaret's elder brother George Robertson. Their final destination was Philadelphia. His parents and ten children, William was fifth of the ten, settled in Cinnaminson, New Jersey, across the Delaware River from Philadelphia.

== Career ==
=== Insurance ===
At the age of 15, William began working as an office boy for a Philadelphia insurance broker. The brokerage was acquired by Johnson and Higgins Insurance Co., and Coe rose to become a manager of the adjusting (claims) department in the New York City office of the maritime insurer. As a young widower following the death of his first wife, during a cruise to England in 1900, he met Mai Rogers, the youngest daughter of industrialist Henry Huttleston Rogers, a key man in Standard Oil.

=== RMS Titanic ===
This marriage brought connections with Standard Oil that expanded Johnson and Higgins' business immensely, while it opened personal business opportunities for Coe. By 1910, Coe had become president of Johnson and Higgins and was involved in insuring the "unsinkable" hull of the RMS Titanic, which sank on its maiden voyage in 1912. Notwithstanding his involvement with the Titanic disaster, Coe rose to chairman of the board of Johnson and Higgins by 1916.

=== Virginian Railway ===
Coe was on the board of directors of the Virginian Railway from 1910 until his death in 1955, and headed the company for a brief period during World War II. He was also a director of Loup Creek Colliery and the Wyoming Land Company. One of his sons, William Rogers Coe, led the financial management of the Virginian Railway for many years as vice-president and treasurer, with offices in New York City.

== Personal life ==
=== Family ===
Coe's first marriage was to Jane Hutchinson Falligant in 1893, the daughter of Judge Robert Falligant of Savannah, Georgia. She died approximately five years later without having children.

On June 4, 1900, Coe married Mai Rogers, the youngest daughter of industrialist Henry Huttleston Rogers and Abbie Gifford Rogers. The Coes had four children: William Rogers Coe (1901–1971), Robert Douglas Coe (1902–1985), Henry Huttleston Rogers Coe (1907–1966), and Natalie Mai Coe (1910–1987).

In December 1926, after the death of Mai Rogers Coe, Coe married Caroline Graham Slaughter. She was the former wife of E. Dick Slaughter, a daughter of Alexander Hutchinson Graham and Cornelia Ligon Graham, and a granddaughter of Alabama lieutenant-governor Robert Fulwood Ligon.

=== Thoroughbred horse racing and breeding ===
Coe liked horses and was a thoroughbred horse racing enthusiast. He built a riding stable on his "Planting Fields" estate and put together a racing stable based at the Saratoga Race Course in Saratoga Springs, New York. Coe's filly Black Maria won the Kentucky Oaks in 1926, the Metropolitan Handicap in 1927, and the first running of the Whitney Handicap in 1928. Black Maria was voted the U.S. Champion Older Female Horse for 1927 and 1928. Among his stables' other notable horses were Cleopatra, the 1920 U.S. Champion 3-year-old Filly, and Ladysman, which won the 1932 Hopeful Stakes and was the American Champion Two-Year-Old Colt.

Six of Coe's horses competed in the Kentucky Derby. His best finish came in 1937, when Pompoon finished second to War Admiral. Coe established Shoshone Stud, and in 1923, he paid $110,000 for The Finn, a then record price for a sire. The Finn died two years later. Coe's colt Pompey won the 1926 Wood Memorial Stakes and was a successful sire; appears four generations back in the pedigree of Secretariat.

=== American West ===
Coe was a fan of the American West; in 1910, he purchased Colonel William F. "Buffalo Bill" Cody's 492-acre (1.99 km^{2}) hunting camp, Irma Lake Lodge, in Cody, Wyoming. For 45 years, he collected Americana memorabilia, gathering original diaries, manuscripts, letters and photographs depicting the struggles of the pioneer settlers. In 1948, the William Robertson Coe Collection was presented to Yale University.

== American Studies Philanthropy ==
The newly renovated William R. Coe Library, University of Wyoming, 2010

Coe's interest in Americana and anti-Communist politics led him to establish programs in American Studies at forty colleges and universities, with continuing funding through the Coe Foundation. He endowed professorships at Yale, Stanford, and the University of Wyoming. Coe saw his support of American Studies as a way to counter the ideological threats of communism during the Cold War.

"I  hereby  further  request  that  the  Professor  to head  the  Program  of  American  studies  shall  always  be  one  who  firmly  believes  in  the  preservation  of  our  System  of  Free  Enterprise  and  is  opposed to the system of State Socialism, Communism and Totalitarianism, and that the portion  of the income  of the fund  which is set aside for the Program of American studies shall be used for the furtherance  of the System above referred to." William Robertson Coe on his donation to Yale in 1950 [7]

=== Donations in Wyoming ===
Coe's ownership of a ranch near Cody, Wyoming, led him to direct much of his giving to this Rocky Mountain state.

At the University of Wyoming, the William Robertson Coe Library, History building, and program in American Studies represent a substantial contribution of private funds to public higher education. The building was completed in 1958 and dedicated to the promotion of American ideals and free enterprise according to his wishes. A bust of William R. Coe occupies the foyer of the history building at the University of Wyoming.

In 2010, the University of Wyoming reopened the William Robertson Coe Library after two years of renovations. Several of Coe's descendants attended the reopening.

Donations from William R. Coe also helped build the Coe Medical Center, now West Park Hospital, in Cody, Wyoming. The Remington Studio Collection (Frederic Remington), as well as other works of art, were purchased by the Coe Foundation and are on display at the Whitney Gallery of Art in Cody, Wyoming. The town of Cody also received many benefactions from him, including its first paved streets, and the 4-faced grand clock on the Park County courthouse building placed there in 1912 and still in use.

== Planting Fields ==
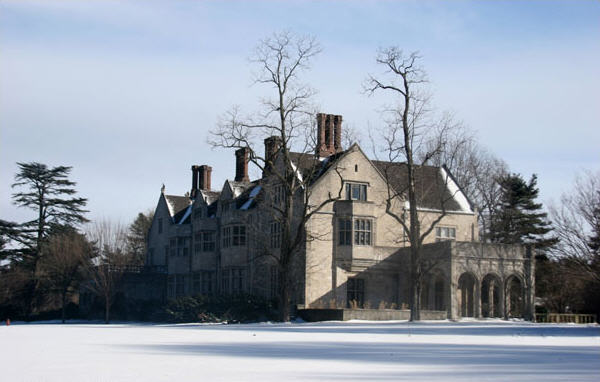
Coe Hall, Planting Fields, 2006

Planting Fields, the Coes' estate in Upper Brookville, New York, was built around 1911 on the famous Gold Coast of Long Island. Coe Hall, the manor house, was designed by the firm of Walker and Gillette and built between 1918 and 1921.

The Coes' interest in rare species of trees and plant collections made the estate a botanical marvel. The 409-acre (1.66 km^{2}) estate was deeded to the State of New York in 1949. Today, owned and operated by The New York State Office of Parks, Recreation and Historic Preservation in cooperation with the Planting Fields foundation, Planting Fields Arboretum State Historic Park is a popular attraction. The historic gates, built in 1712 in Sussex, England (which Coe had imported), have been used as a setting for numerous films.

== Death and legacy ==
When Coe died unexpectedly of an asthma attack at his new home in Palm Beach, Florida on March 14, 1955, he was buried at Locust Valley Cemetery on Long Island.

Two years after his death, in 1957, the Virginian Railway named its new tugboat W. R. Coe in his memory. After the VGN merger with the Norfolk and Western in 1959, it was renamed R.B. Claytor (for the N&W leader, Robert B. Claytor). As of 2003, the tugboat was serving the harbor of Boston as the Karen B. Tibbetts.
