= William Coe (governor) =

Governor of Guam (1857–1909)

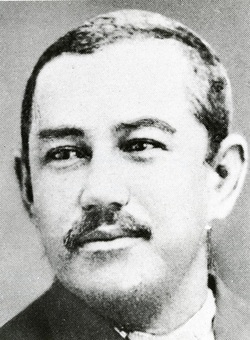

Governor of Guam Acting
- In office April 20, 1899 – May 9, 1899
- Preceded by: Joaquín Cruz Pérez
- Succeeded by: Louis A. Kaiser

Personal details
- Born: William Pritchard Coe; April 12, 1857 Apia, Samoa
- Died: 1909 (aged 51–52) Davao, Philippines

William Pritchard Coe (1857-1909) briefly served as Governor of Guam during 1899. He served in this position for two weeks. Previously Coe had lived in Samoa. Coe was the son of the American merchant and Consul Jonas Mynderse Coe who was born February 12, 1823, in Troy, New York and his first wife, Le'uta Malietoa born in Salesatele, Samoa the daughter of a chief.

== See also ==
- List of minority governors and lieutenant governors in the United States

Political offices
Preceded by Joaquín Cruz Pérez	Governor of Guam; Acting; 1899	Succeeded by Louis A. Kaiser
