= William Robertson Coe II =

William Robertson Coe II (28 November, 1926 – 23 November, 2009) was an American archaeologist and Mayanist academic. He conducted extensive field work on pre-Columbian Maya civilization sites, and published numerous works on the subject.

Coe's academic career was spent in association with the Museum of Archaeology and Anthropology at the University of Pennsylvania, where he studied and later taught as professor in anthropology. He curated the museum's American collection. He joined the University of Pennsylvania's Tikal project in 1956, and became the third and final director of the project in 1963, a position he held until the project ended in 1970. Coe was responsible for coordinating much of the site's restoration work and compiling the documentation of the field seasons reports.

Coe was the son of designer Clover Simonton and banker William Rogers Coe. His brother was fellow Mayanist Michael D. Coe, with whom he had a falling-out in the early 1960s. The two rarely spoke of each other afterward. Michael once left him in a deep excavation trench in Belize, where William examined some potsherds and wondered why they had been placed so deliberately, leading to his long fascination with context and formation processes.
