= Johnson & Higgins =

- Industry: Insurance broker
- Founded: 1845; 181 years ago
- Founder: Henry Ward Johnson; A. Foster Higgins
- Defunct: 1997; 29 years ago
- Fate: Acquired by Marsh McLennan
- Headquarters: New York
- Number of employees: 8,400

Johnson & Higgins was one of the largest insurance brokers. In 1997, it was acquired by Marsh McLennan.

== History ==
The company was founded in 1845 in New York as Jones & Johnson by Walter Restored Jones, Jr. and Henry Ward Johnson. In 1854, the company was renamed when A. Foster Higgins replaced Jones who left to do business on his own. By 1900, the company had offices in 8 cities and had 75 employees.

In 1912, the company brokered U.S. portion of the $5.6 million coverage of the Titanic at a nominal rate.

In 1923, it acquired Albert Willcox & Co., establishing itself in the reinsurance market.

In 1964, the company acquired Don Miller Company.

In 1996, the company acquired Corporate Risk PLC, the largest independent insurance broker in Scotland.

In 1997, it was acquired by Marsh McLennan for $1.8 billion. Of the sale proceeds, $1.01 billion went to J&H's active directors and shareholding managing principals, $500 million was earmarked for 600 key J&H employees, and $297 million was paid to 40 retired directors; however, the retired directors sued, alleging that they were shortchanged.

== Legal issues ==
In 1999, the company agreed to pay $28 million to settle an age discrimination lawsuit filed in 1993 resulting from a company policy that mandated that members of its board of directors retire at age 62.
