= Planting Fields Arboretum State Historic Park =

Coordinates: 40°51′39″N 73°33′26″W

- Planting Fields Arboretum
- U.S. National Register of Historic Places
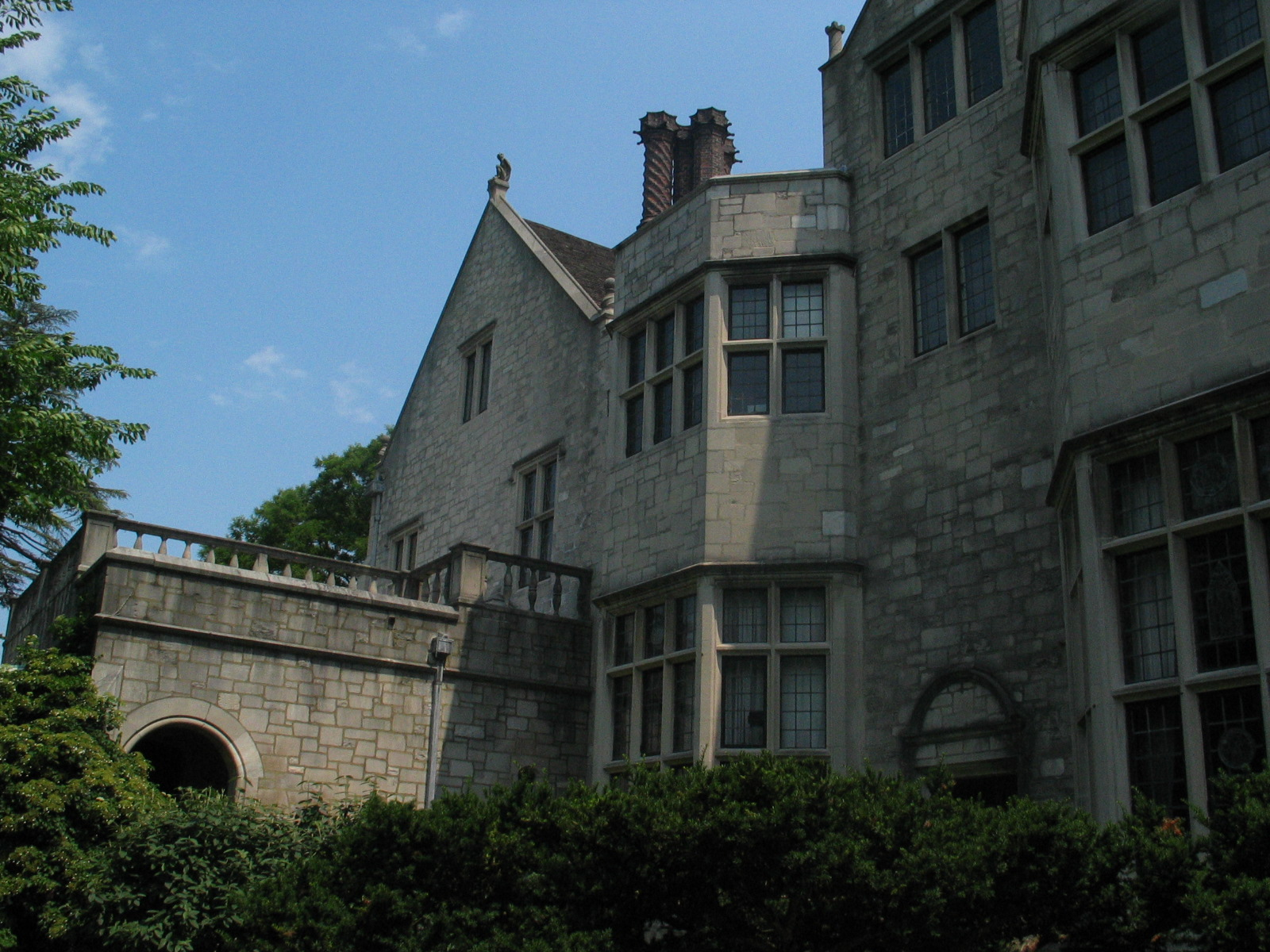
- The Main House at Planting Fields Arboretum

- Location within New York Location within the United States
- Nearest city: Oyster Bay, New York
- Built: 1915
- Architect: Guy Lowell; Walker & Gillette
- Architectural style: Tudor Revival
- NRHP reference No.: 79001598
- Added to NRHP: January 25, 1979

Planting Fields Arboretum State Historic Park, which includes the Main House Historic House Museum (formerly referred to as Coe Hall), is an arboretum and state park covering over 400 acres (160 ha) located in the village of Upper Brookville in the town of Oyster Bay, New York.

Near the end of America's Gilded Age, the estate named Planting Fields was the home of William Robertson Coe, an insurance and railroad executive, and his wife Mary "Mai" Huttleston (née Rogers) Coe, the youngest daughter of millionaire industrialist Henry H. Rogers, who had been a principal of Standard Oil. It includes the 67-room Main House, greenhouses, gardens, woodland paths, and outstanding plant collections. Its grounds were designed by Guy Lowell, A. R. Sargent, the Olmsted Brothers, and others. Planting Fields also features an herbarium of over 10,000 pressed specimens.

The name "Planting Fields" comes from the Matinecock Indians who cultivated the rich soil in the clearings high above Long Island Sound.

== History ==
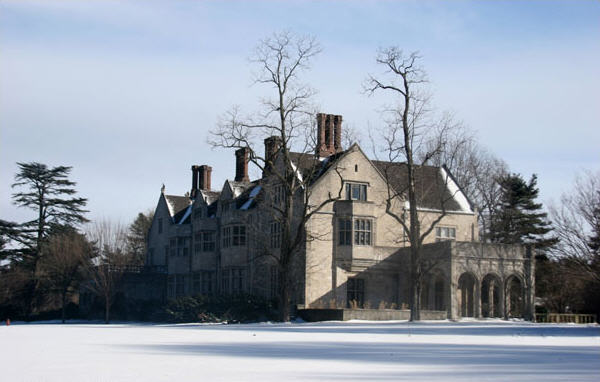
Photo of the Main House by Robert Swanson

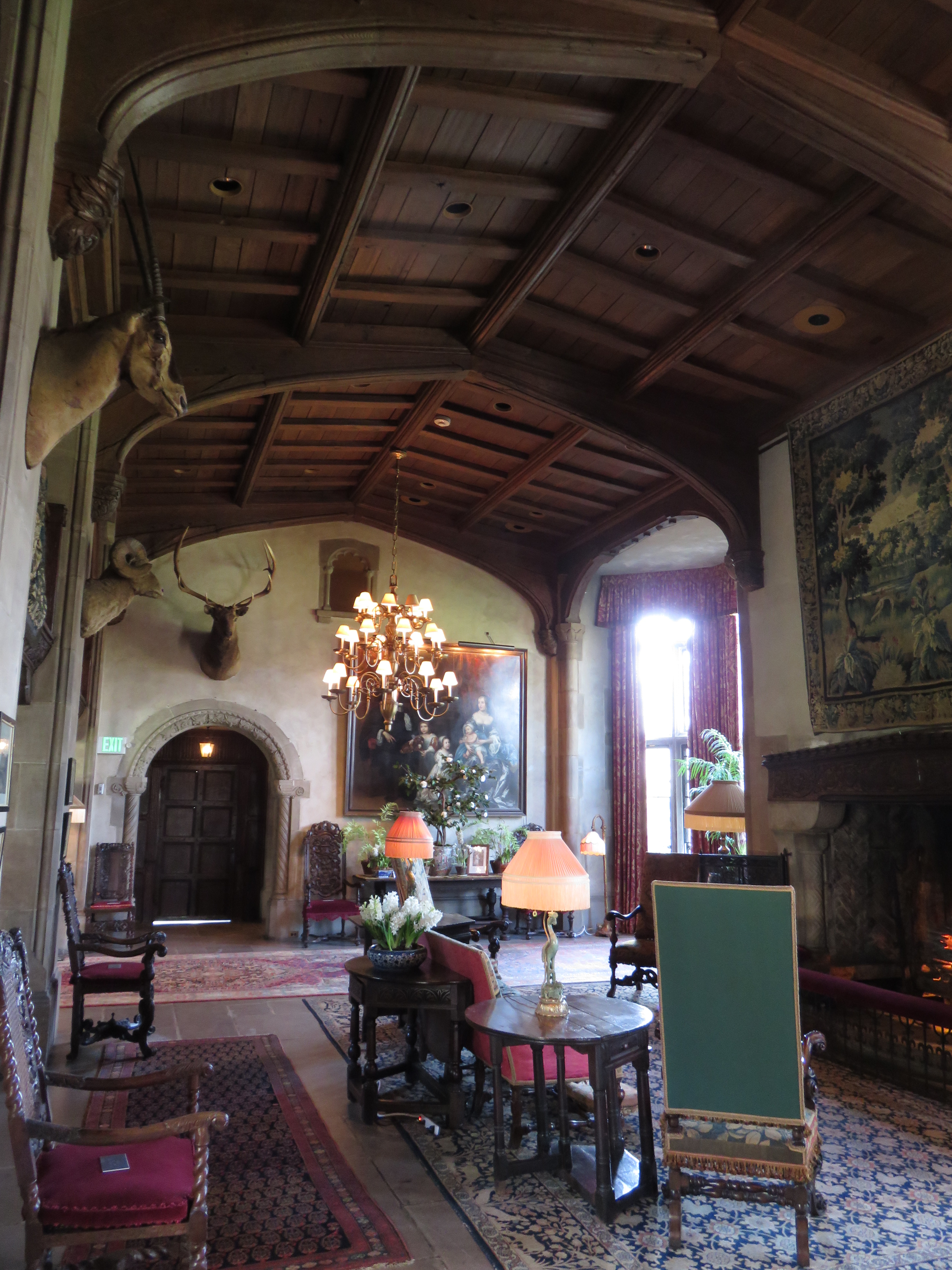
The gallery

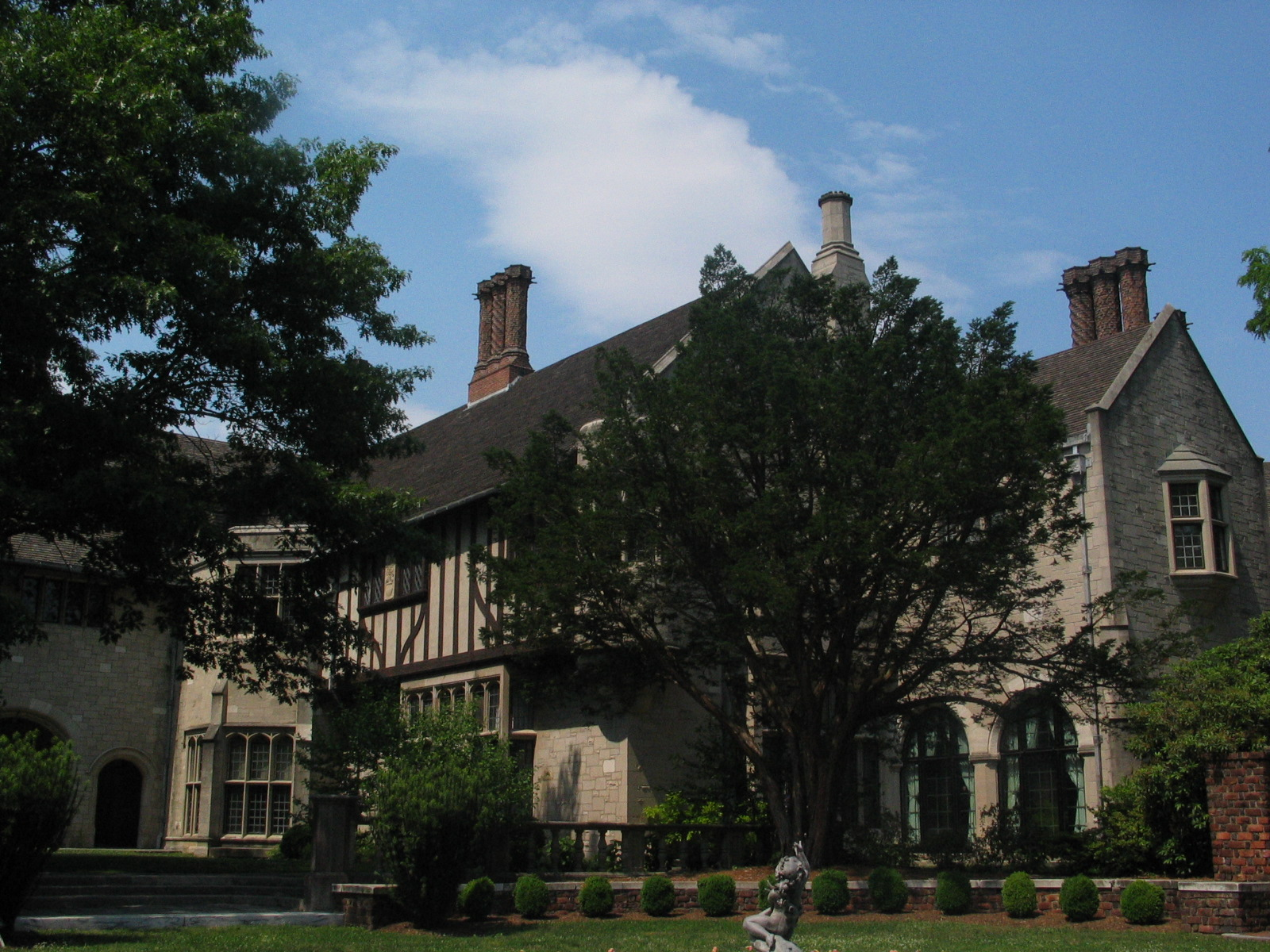
The Main House as seen from other side

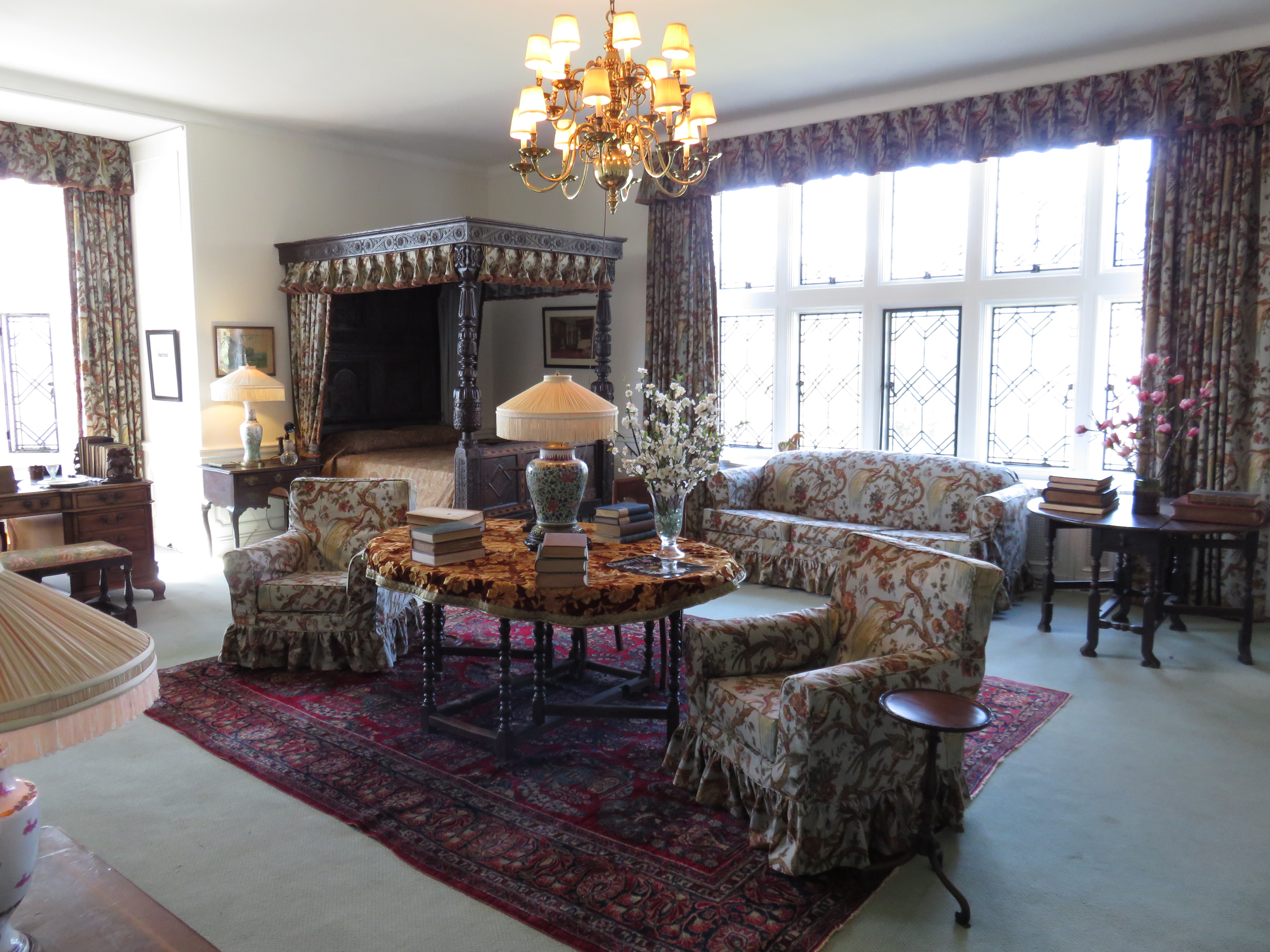
Mr. Coe's bedroom

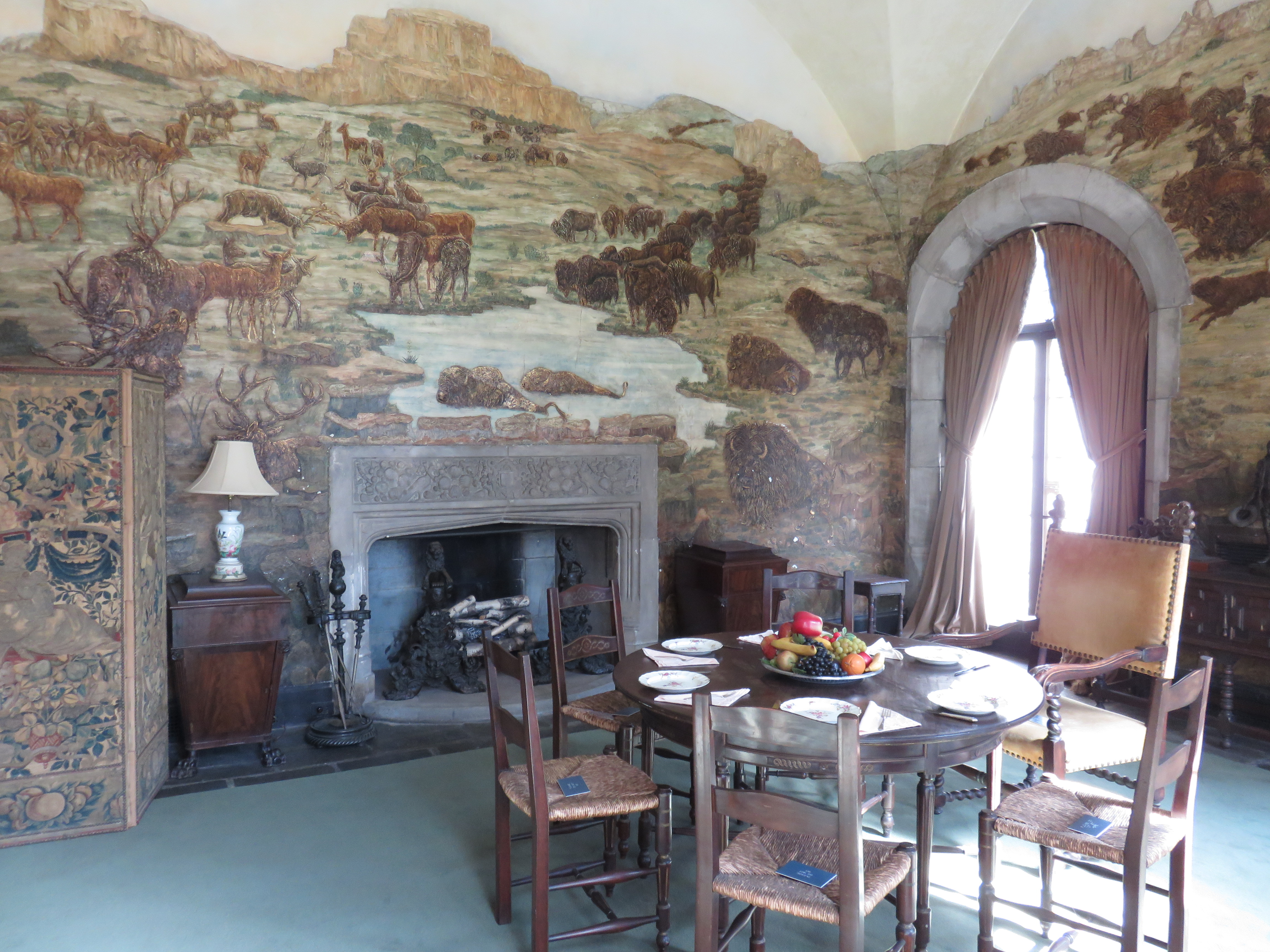
Buffalo Room

The history of the present-day property on the famous "Gold Coast" of Long Island began between 1904 and 1912, when Helen MacGregor Byrne – wife of New York City lawyer James Byrne – purchased six farming properties which she collectively referred to as "Upper Planting Fields Farm". The Byrnes hired landscape architect James Leal Greenleaf between 1904 and 1910 to create hedges, perennial borders, and espaliered fruit trees. Though notable features from this period are the Rose Arbor, the Circular Pool and the Green Garden Court, Coe recalled in later life, "Mrs Byrne had done very little in the shape of landscaping. She had a small lawn around the ridge of the residence" and next to it a cornfield. Most of the property, Coe recalled, was "just a jungle of scrub, locusts, and other trees".

In 1913, William Robertson Coe purchased the house and 353-acre (143 ha) estate, and began today's plantings and landscaping under the guidance of the Boston landscaping firm of Guy Lowell and A. Robeson Sargent, son of Charles Sargent, founder of the Arnold Arboretum. In 1915, Lowell and Sargent oversaw transport of two gigantic beeches from Fairhaven, Massachusetts, the childhood home of Mary "Mai" Huttleston (née Rogers) Coe (who was the daughter of Henry H. Rogers of Standard Oil). The trees, with root balls 30 feet (9.1 m) in diameter, were ferried across Long Island Sound in mid-winter. Roads were widened and utility wires temporarily removed to make way. Only one of the two trees survived the journey. Unfortunately, the second beech tree has recently died, and was taken down in February 2006. However, the “Fairhaven Beech” will live on: seedlings were collected from the tree from 2000 to 2005.

Massive purchases of rhododendrons were made in England, Japanese crabapples and cherries, and forest and specimen trees, lindens, Scotch and red pines, oaks. Through the English nurseryman Glomar Waterer, who had sold Mr Coe the rhododendrons, came an offer in 1916 of an unusually fine collection of camellias located in Guernsey, for which the Camellia House was constructed by "Bobo" Sargent in autumn 1917, and filled with the plants grown in tubs that were shipped the following spring. Most of them were selected varieties of Camellia japonica but there were six Camellia reticulata, never before grown in the United States.

The property's first mansion burned to the ground on March 19, 1918; its replacement, the present Main House, was constructed between 1918 and 1921 in the Tudor Revival style and faced in Indiana limestone. It was designed by the firm of Walker & Gillette and was completed in 1921. Images from a book of English country houses inspired its architecture, especially those of Moyns Park, Athelhampton, and St. Catherine's Court.

William and Mai Coe's interest in rare species of trees and plant collections made the estate a botanical marvel. Mai, who was chronically ill for the last decade of her life, died on December 28, 1924, at the age of forty-nine and is buried nearby. The 353-acre (1.43 km^{2}) estate was deeded to the state of New York in 1949 (during Mr. Coe's lifetime) to become a state park.

== The main gardens ==
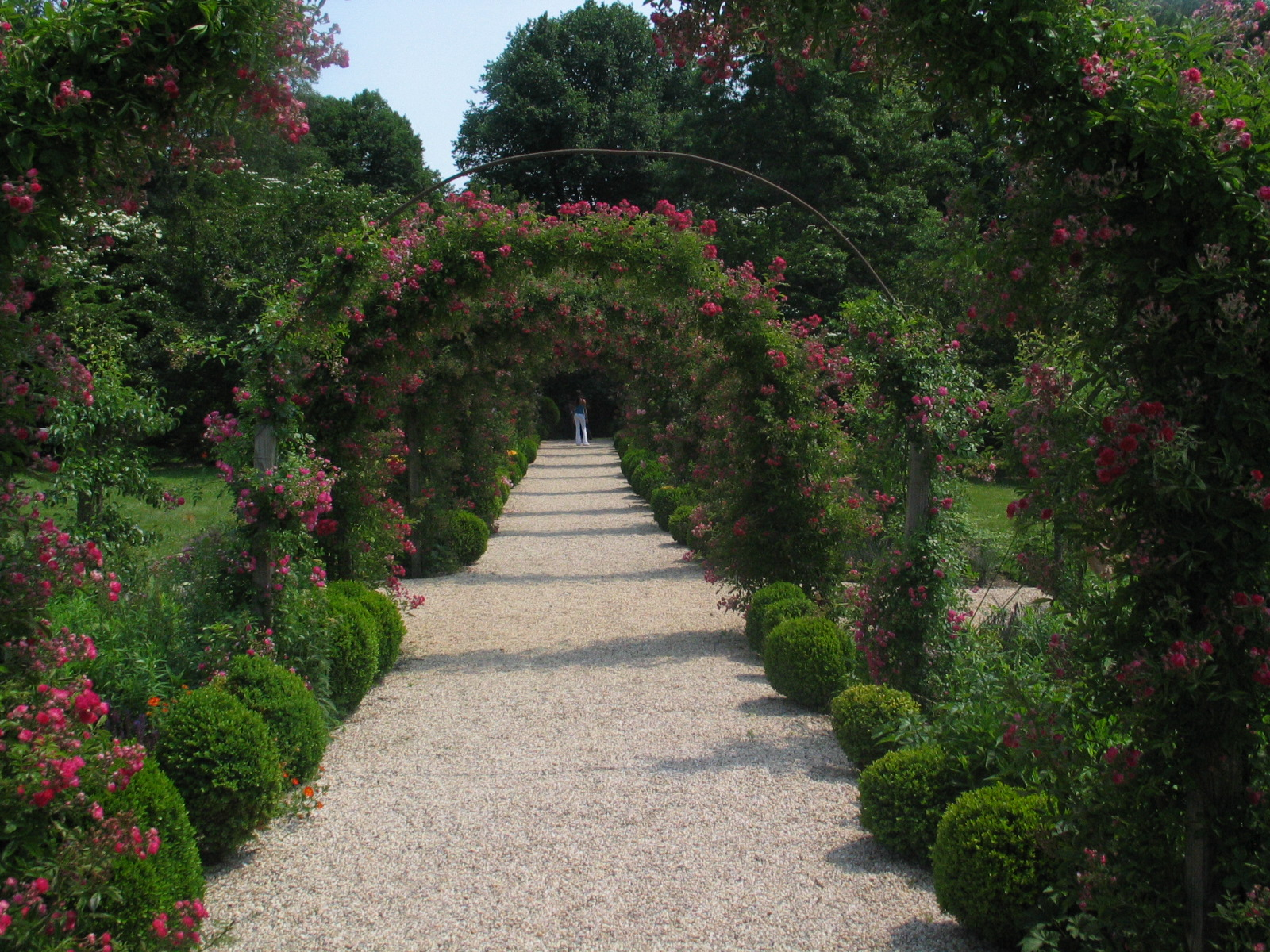
View of the arboretum

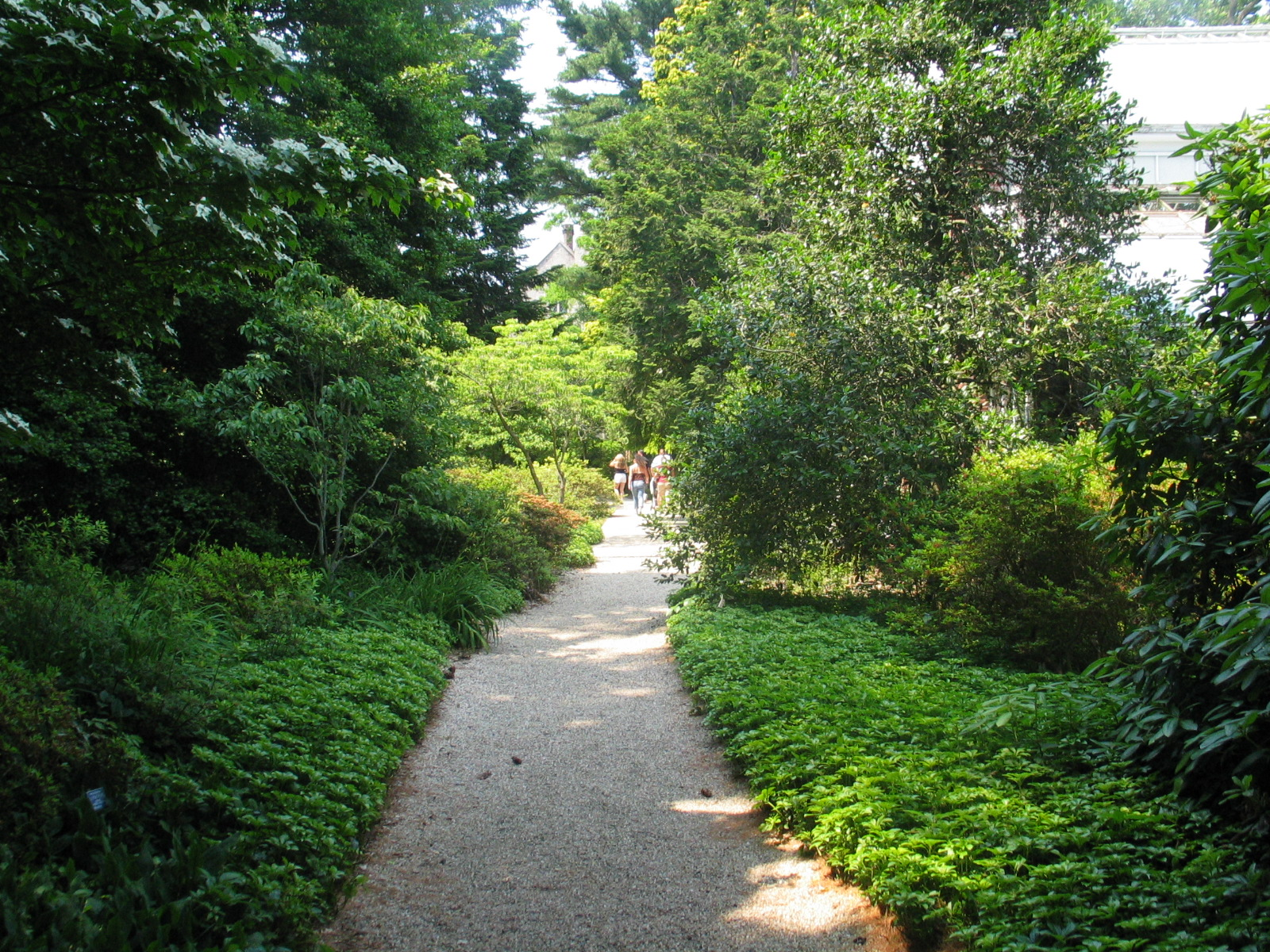
A wooded path

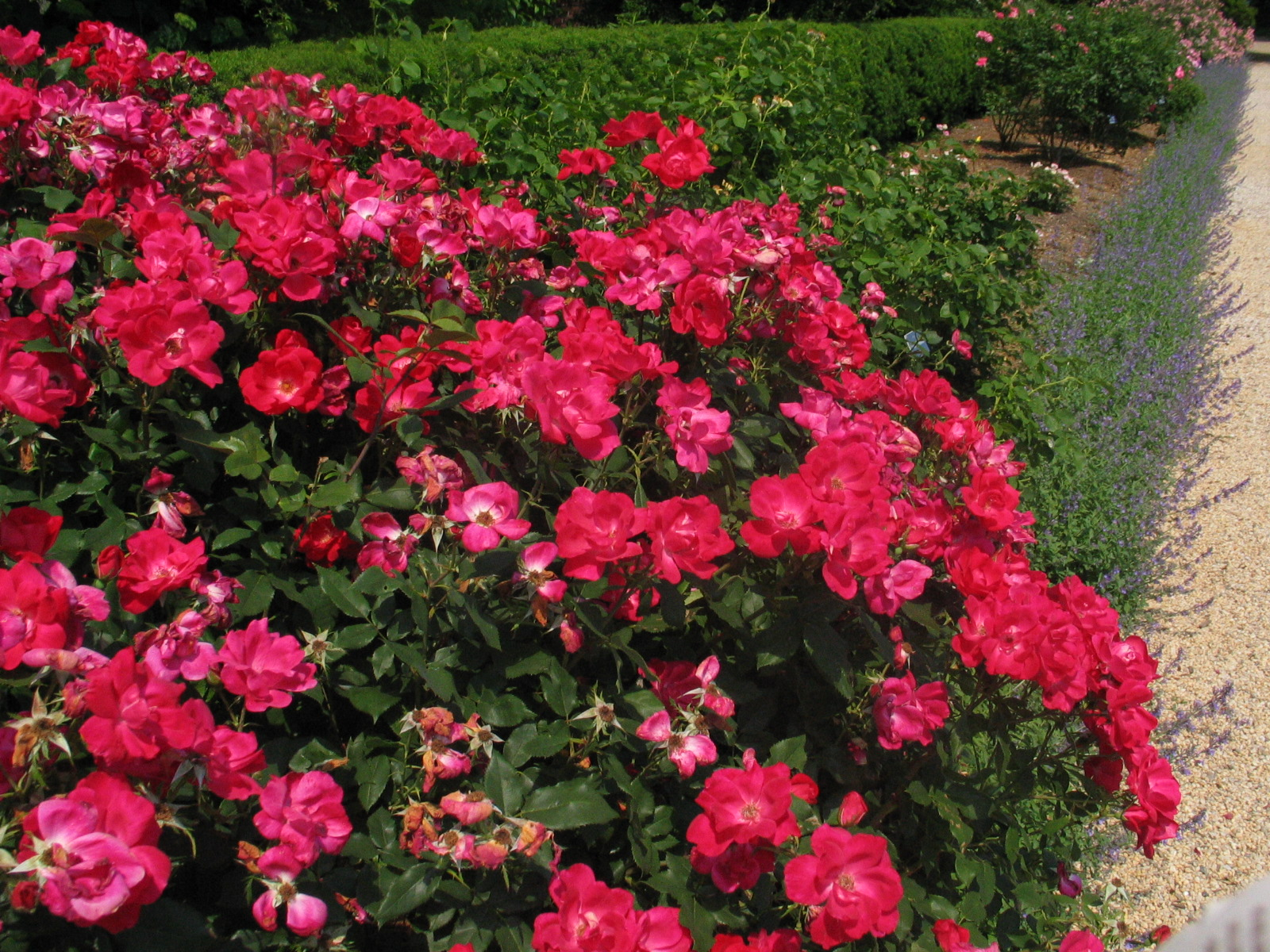
Flowers

Sargent created The Italian Blue Pool Garden between 1914 and 1918, with the Tea House built in 1915 to designs by Guy Lowell. Historically this garden was planted with spring-blooming perennials such as delphiniums, irises, peonies, and poppies. It is currently being restored to this original form.

After the unexpected death of A.R. Sargent in 1918, the Coes appointed the Olmsted Brothers of Brookline, Massachusetts, with James Frederick Dawson as chief landscape architect, who brought their signature "naturalistic" look to the north side of the property. They completed additions to the Main Greenhouse and Camellia Greenhouse, as well as the Beech Copse, Main Lawn, West Lawn and Heather Garden.

The Green Garden features a circular pool. Nearby Azalea Walks and Vista Path show hundreds of varieties of azalea and rhododendron. The Rose Arbor and Rose Garden contain over 680 Tea, shrub, and miniature roses.

The Synoptic Garden displays over 500 types of tree and shrub, arranged in alphabetical order by botanical name. The Magnolia Collection contains over 80 types of deciduous and evergreen agnolia. The Rhododendron Collection shows over 1,000 types of azalea and rhododendron.

The Camellia Greenhouse (Lowell & Sargent, 1917; revised and extended by Olmsted Brothers, 1917–1922) was built specifically to house the camellia collection, originally of 114 full-grown plants; currently the collection consists of over 300 plants. It was James F. Dawson's idea to sink the tubs directly in the ground, rather than trundle them out seasonally, the usual procedure for camellias grown in greenhouses.

The Main Greenhouse (Lowell & Sargent/Olmsted Brothers) was constructed between 1914 and 1929, with a Hibiscus House added in 1929 for the Coes' hibiscus collection. Today, the Main Greenhouse offers large collections of orchids, cacti and succulents, houseplants, ferns and begonias, as well as seasonal displays of chrysanthemum, poinsettia, hydrangea, coleus, etc.

The North Border features the holly collection, Dwarf Conifer Garden, Conifer Trail, Heather Garden, and Species Rhododendron. The holly collection includes over 100 different types of evergreen hollies such as English, American, Asian and hybrid forms. The Dwarf Conifer Garden features dozens of varieties of spruce, fir, Chamaecyparis, juniper, pine, etc. The nearby full-scale conifers can reach over 60 feet (18 m) tall, and include sequoia, metasequoia, larch, fir, spruce and pine, with a large assortment of Rhododendron species under the canopy. The Heather Garden features low growing heaths and heathers, as well as rhododendron, azalea, and other flowering plants.

The Dahlia Garden offers several hundred varieties of show-quality dahlias.

Finally, there are over 200 acres (81 ha) of woodland at Planting Fields, with miles of walking trails through the woods. Before some recent losses the Long Island Horticultural Society reported that eighteen of the trees at Planting Fields were the largest of their species on Long Island.

== College campus period ==
During an interim period between 1955 and 1964, in addition to its role as Planting Fields Arboretum, a park, the land was used as a temporary campus for a State University of New York (SUNY) college of science and engineering, which was known as the State University College on Long Island at Oyster Bay (SUCOLI) while donated land in Stony Brook, NY was being developed into the new permanent campus. In 1962 Stony Brook University moved to its new home, and transitioned for a two-year period between the campuses. At first all activities were located inside Coe Hall, but as the college grew, dormitories were moved to the stables and temporary dome structures were erected on the grounds for classes and laboratories. Subsequent to Stony Brook University moving to its permanent campus in Suffolk County, the site became home to another SUNY endeavor, the Center for International studies and World Affairs ("ISWA"). When this SUNY undertaking was shut down in 1968, all facilities and grounds became the current day Planting Fields.

== Planting Fields today ==
Today it is owned and operated by New York State Office of Parks, Recreation, and Historic Preservation in cooperation with Planting Fields Foundation, with its world-renowned arboretum and the Main House mansion, is a popular attraction. The wrought-iron Carshalton Gates, built in Sussex, England in 1712 for Carshalton Park, were imported by Coe in 1921 and have been used as a setting for numerous motion pictures. While the park entirely lies within Upper Brookville, the parcel of the park in which the famous Carshalton Park gates are located is in the Village of Matinecock. Because most Gold Coast villages wanted to remain business free areas, many do not have their own post offices or ZIP Codes. Therefore, Oyster Bay Post Office which serves this area of Upper Brookville is displayed as the official USPS mailing address.

Planting Fields Arboretum was listed on the National Register of Historic Places in 1979.

== See also ==
- List of botanical gardens in the United States
- List of New York State Historic Sites
