= Natalie Mai Vitetti =

Natalie Mai Coe, Countess Vitetti (1910–1987) was the only daughter of insurance and railroad executive William Robertson Coe and Mai Huttleston (née Rogers) Coe.

== Biography ==
Born in 1910, Natalie Mai Coe was educated by private tutors until adolescence when she attended the Foxcroft School in Virginia. She graduated from the Spence School in New York City in 1930. She made her New York society debut that year, on the evening of 25 December, at a Southern-plantation-theme ball held in her honor at the Ritz-Carlton. The decorations included the installation of a mock Southern house, with a painting by Hoppner hanging above the brick fireplace in the drawing room. As the New York Times reported the following day, "The ballroom and its approaches had been transformed to represent, as nearly as possible, Cherokee Plantation, the old home of [her father and stepmother, the former Caroline Graham Slaughter] near Charleston, S.C. A winding hedge of lofty cedar trees led from the entrance hall up the broad grass-carpeted stairway to the portico of the Southern Colonial homestead, red brick façade with four white columns and heavy cornices and pediment reaching to the ceiling, which had been covered with blue gauze dotted with silver stars to represent the sky."

On May 19, 1934, at Planting Fields, her family's country house in Oyster Bay, New York, Natalie Mai Coe married Commendatore Leonardo Vitetti of Italy, a counselor of the Italian embassy in London who also was a scholar of medieval poetry.

In 1938, Vitetti was created a count by the Italian government for notable service. Among his other diplomatic positions, Count Vitetti, who died in 1973, was the Italian representative to the United Nations between 1950 and 1956. The Vitettis had one son, Ernesto, who resided in Rome, Italy. Natalie was a Trustee of the Planting Fields Foundation until her death in 1987.

She was a notable horsewoman, and a collector of books on cooking and culinary history.
