= Savannah and Atlanta 750 =

Preserved American 4-6-2 steam locomotive based in Georgia

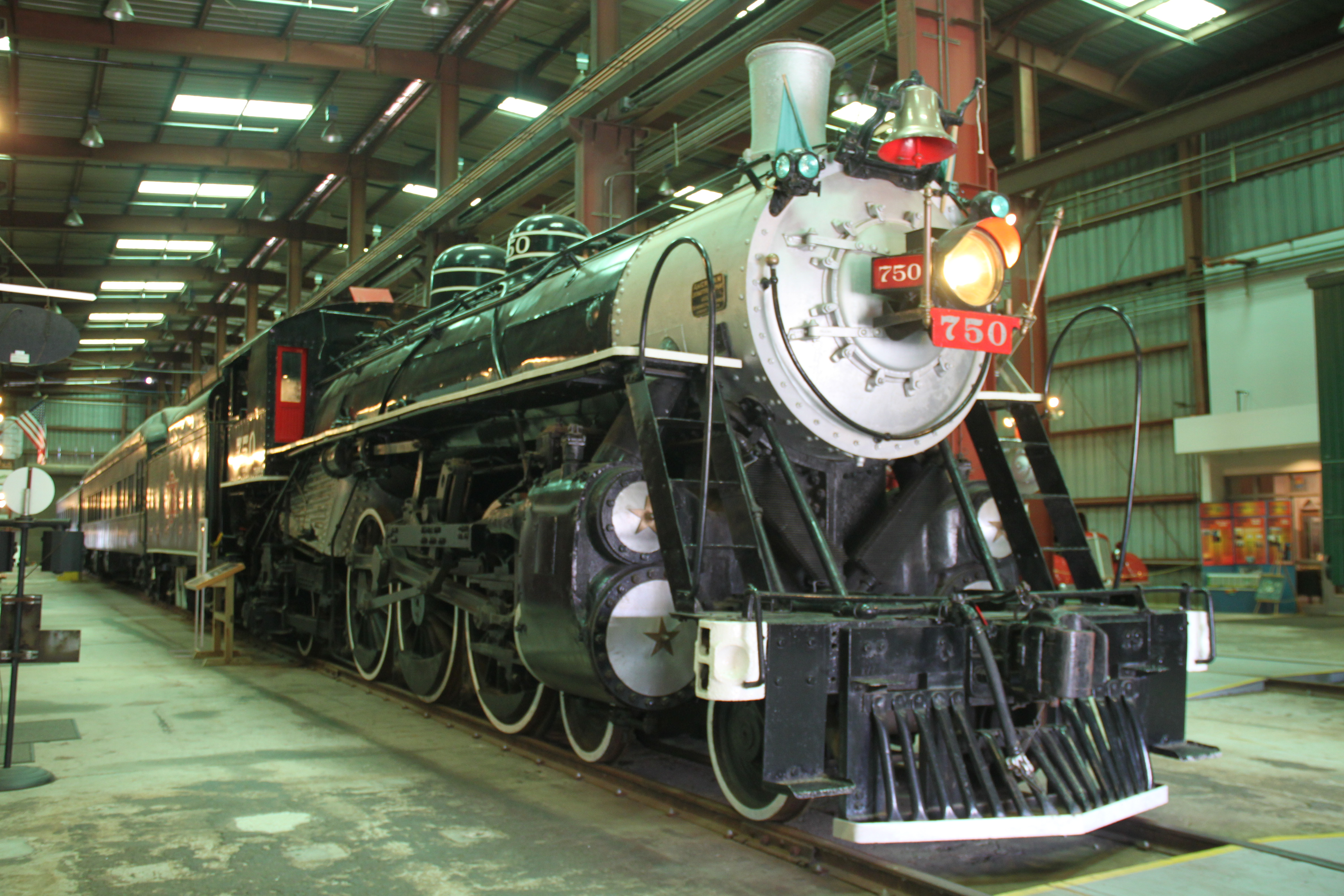
- Savannah and Atlanta No. 750 resting at the Southeastern Railway Museum in Duluth, Georgia in 2012
Type and origin
- Power type: Steam
- Builder: American Locomotive Company (Schenectady Works)
- Serial number: 46567
- Build date: January 1910
Specifications
- Configuration
  - Whyte: 4-6-2
  - UIC: 2′C1′ h
- Gauge: 4 ft 8 1/2 in (1,435 mm) standard gauge
- Driver dia.: 68 in (1,727 mm)
- Adhesive weight: 126,500 lb (57.4 tonnes)
- Loco weight: 204,000 lb (92.5 tonnes)
- Tender weight: 162,000 lb (73.5 tonnes)
- Total weight: 366,000 lb (166.0 tonnes)
- Fuel type: New: Oil; Now: Coal
- Fuel capacity: 18 t (18 long tons; 20 short tons)
- Water cap.: 7,500 US gal (28,000 L; 6,200 imp gal)
- Firebox
  - Grate area: 47.1 sq ft (4.4 m^{2})
- Boiler: 66 5/8 in (1,692 mm)
- Boiler pressure: 200 psi (1.38 MPa)
- Heating surface
  - Firebox: 165 sq ft (15.3 m^{2})
- Superheater
  - Heating area: 442 sq ft (41.1 m^{2})
- Cylinders: Two, outside
- Cylinder size: 22 in × 26 in (559 mm × 660 mm)
- Valve gear: Walschaerts
- Valve type: 11-inch (279 mm) piston valves
- Loco brake: Air
- Train brakes: Air
- Couplers: Knuckle
Performance figures
- Maximum speed: 70 mph (113 km/h)
- Tractive effort: 31,000 lbf (137.89 kN)
- Factor of adh.: 4.47
Career
- Operators: Florida East Coast Railway (1910–1935); Savannah and Atlanta Railway (1935–1962); Southern Railway (1964–1984); New Georgia Railroad (1985–1989)
- Class: 65
- Numbers: FEC 80; S&A 750
- Nicknames: The Little Ballerina
- Retired: 1962 (revenue service); 1989 (excursion service)
- Restored: 1964 (1st excursion service)
- Current owner: Atlanta Chapter of the National Railway Historical Society
- Disposition: Static Display

Savannah and Atlanta 750, formerly Florida East Coast 80, is a 4-6-2 "Light Pacific" type steam locomotive built in January 1910 by the American Locomotive Company of Schenectady, New York, originally for the Florida East Coast Railway as No. 80. Throughout the 1930s, FEC had sold of several of their locomotives, with No. 80 being sold in 1935 to the Savannah and Atlanta Railway, where it was renumbered to 750. The locomotive pulled commuter passenger trains and occasional mixed freight trains for the S&A, until the railroad dieselized in the early 1950s.

In 1962, the locomotive was donated to the Atlanta Chapter of the National Railway Historical Society, who began using the locomotive to pull occasional excursion trains. No. 750 was subsequently leased to the Southern Railway for use to pull trains for their new steam excursion program, and the lease ended in 1984. From 1985 to 1989, the locomotive pulled excursion trains for the New Georgia Railroad around Atlanta, until it was pulled from service, due to firebox issues. As of 2026, No. 750 remains on display at the Southeastern Railway Museum in Duluth, Georgia.

== History ==
=== Revenue service on the FEC and S&A ===
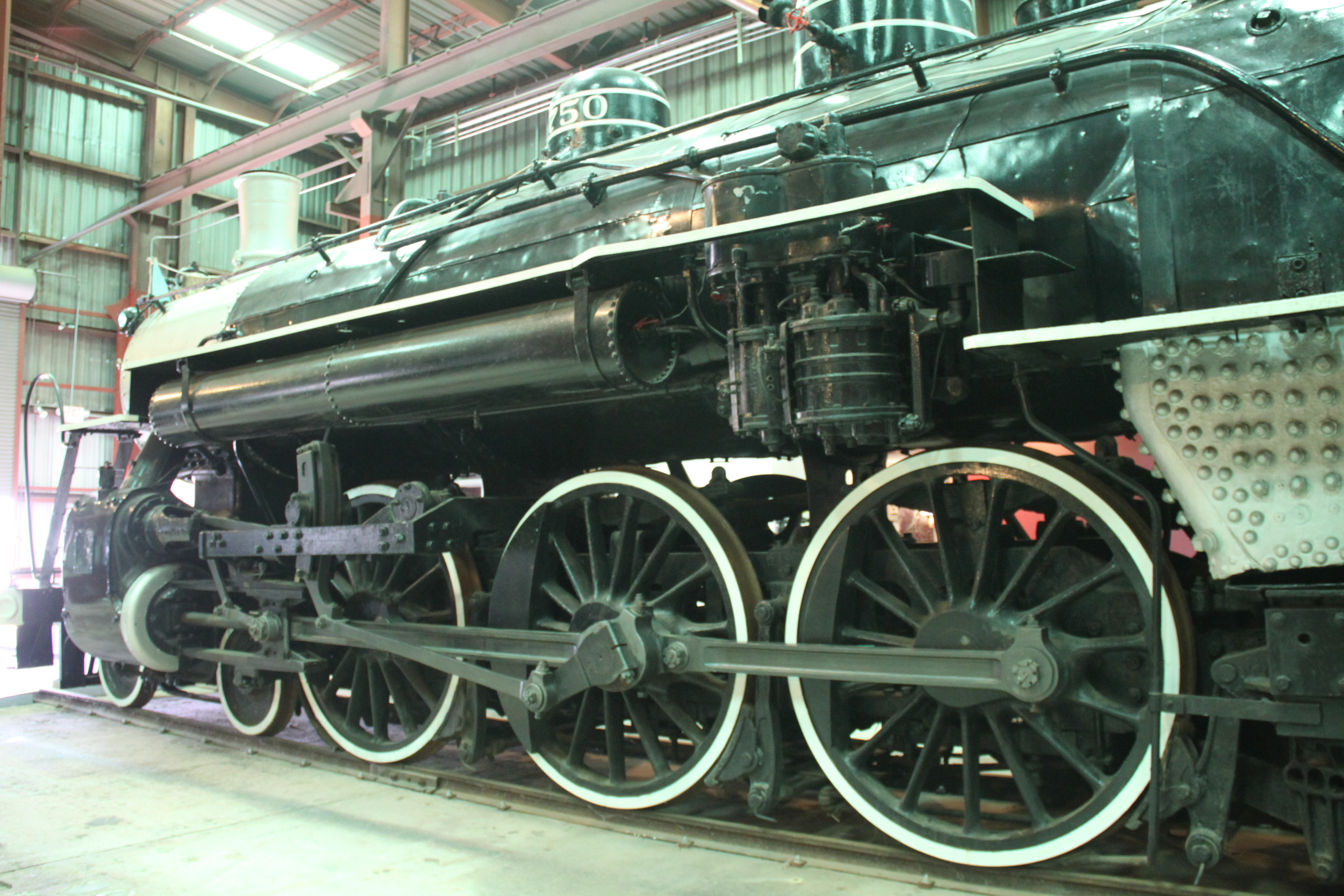
A close-up of No. 750's running gear in 2012

No. 750 was the fourteenth member of the Florida East Coast Railway's thirty-one class 65 4-6-2 "Pacific" type locomotives built by the American Locomotive Company's former Schenectady Locomotive Works in Schenectady, New York in January 1910, and No. 750 was originally numbered 80. The FEC assigned No. 80 to pull passenger trains on their mainline, mostly across their Overseas Railroad between Miami and Key West, Florida. In 1926, No. 80 was one of five class 65 4-6-2s to be modified with larger cylinders, superheated flues, and other features to make their performances more identical to the class 98 locomotives. In 1935, however, the Labor Day Hurricane destroyed many of the Overseas Railroad route's long bridges, and due to the Great Depression, the FEC closed the line down. In order to recoup their financial losses, the FEC sold off most of their 4-6-2s, and No. 80 was sold to the Savannah and Atlanta Railway in October.

Upon arrival of the S&A, No. 80 was renumbered to 750, its firebox was converted from burning oil to burning coal, and was repainted to have a closer resemblance to a typical Southeastern American passenger locomotive. The S&A reassigned the No. 750 to haul passengers between Savannah and Camak in Georgia. It also often interchanged with the Central of Georgia Railway, so the passengers would reach Atlanta. This practice, however, slowly became less common for the No. 750, as the S&A added diesel locomotives to their fleet.

In 1948 the locomotive was retired and placed into storage. The following year, the No. 750 was restored to operating condition, during which it received a new tender and other parts from an ex-New York, Ontario and Western Railway Y-Series 4-8-2 that the S&A had bought in 1945, which was subsequently scrapped. The locomotive was kept to one side as a “pet” of the president of the S&A, Charles E. Gay. During this time, it operated in maintenance of way service. While the locomotive was pulling a weed spraying train, it hit an automobile at a grade crossing and as a result it had its boiler tube pilot replaced with a “reinforced” one. In 1962, the 750 was retired from revenue service and it was donated to the Atlanta Chapter of the National Railway Historical Society (NRHS).

=== Excursion service ===
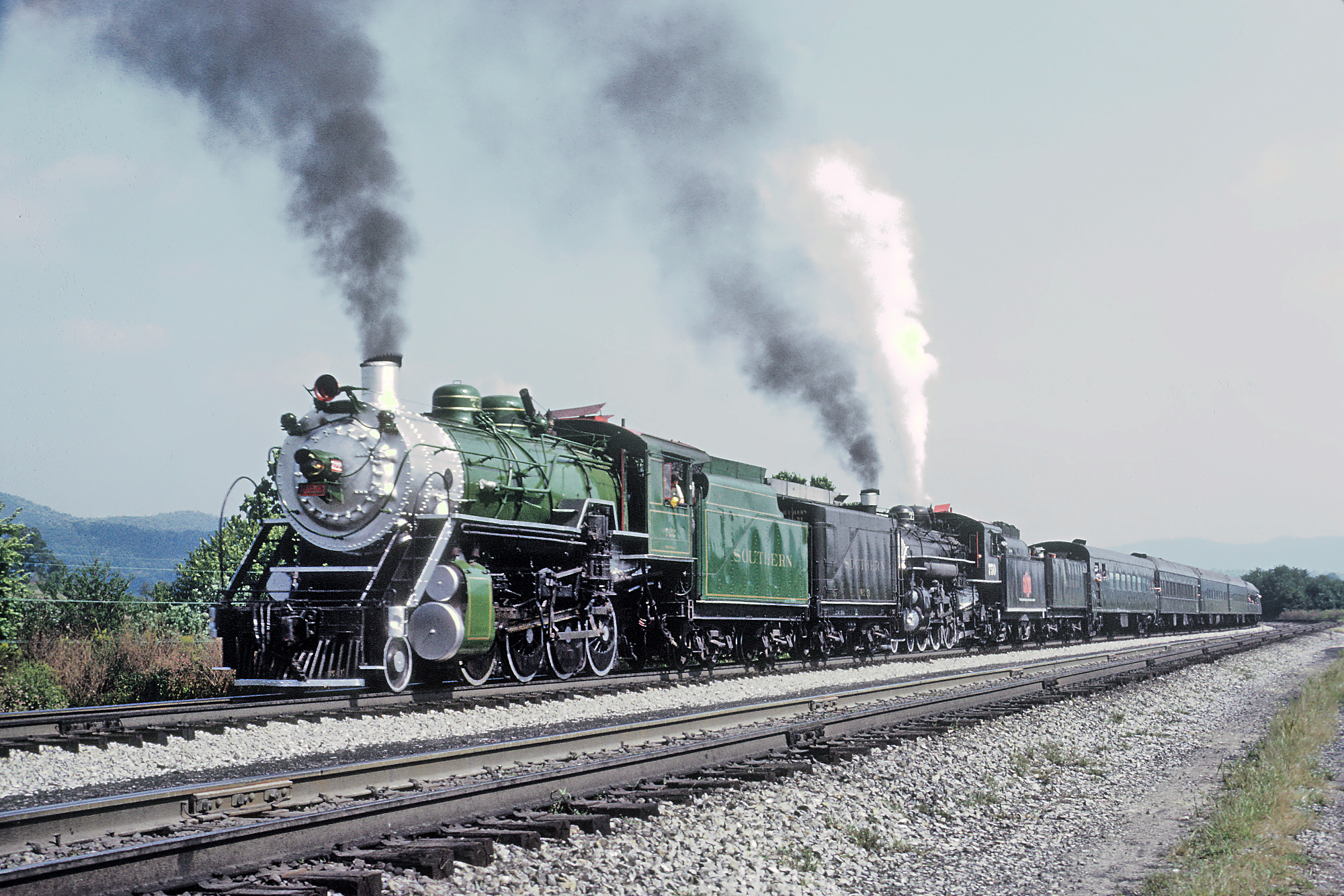
No. 750 double heading behind No. 722 with an excursion train through Montvale, Virginia in August 1971

During 1962 and 1963, 750 would begin its excursion carrier by operating out of Atlanta on trips over the Georgia Railroad and West Point Route. Subsequently on August 29, 1964, No. 750 became the very first steam locomotive to pull a public excursion train on the Southern Railway (SOU) as it pulled one such trip to Jonesborough, Georgia for the centennial of the Battle of Jonesborough, for the Atlanta Chapter NRHS. Within the following years, the SOU would keep the No. 750 on loan to pull a variety of excursion trains on their mainline trackage alongside SOU steam locomotives Nos. 4501, 722, and 630. In November 1969, during the 75th anniversary of the Southern Railway, an event called the "Steam-O-Rama" took place in Anniston, Alabama, along the Birmingham to Atlanta main line. It featured the No. 750, No. 4501, and visiting British locomotive London and North Eastern Railway A3 No. 4472 Flying Scotsman. As time dragged on, however, the steam program had grown so popular, that the trains have exceeded the No. 750's hauling capacity. Hence, why the locomotive would receive assistance from diesels, and it would take parts in some doubleheaders with 722. In 1975, the No. 750 was taken out of service for an extensive overhaul. In 1983, it went back into service and double-headed an NRHS excursion with Norfolk and Western 611 on Richmond, Fredericksburg and Potomac (RF&P) trackage from Alexandria to Richmond, Virginia, on July 17.

After the 1984 season ended, the Southern's lease to operate No. 750 ended, and the locomotive was returned to Atlanta. The locomotive was then leased to the New Georgia Railroad to pull mainline trips throughout certain parts of Georgia. In 1989, however, No. 750's firebox was discovered to have been worn out, and after estimating the repair to be too costly, it was decided to remove No. 750 from service, and the New Georgia Railroad subsequently operated a larger locomotive, Atlanta and West Point 290.

=== Disposition ===
As of 2026, the No. 750 remains on static display at the Southeastern Railroad Museum in Duluth, Georgia. The museum keeps No. 750 in good cosmetic condition for the general public to enjoy.

== See also ==
- Atlantic Coast Line 1504
- Canadian Pacific 1238
- Canadian Pacific 1278
- Canadian Pacific 1293
- Florida East Coast 153
- Pennsylvania Railroad 1361
- Reading and Northern 425
- Southern Pacific 2472
- Southern Pacific 2467
- Southern Railway 1401
- U.S. Sugar 148

== Bibliography ==
- Bramson, Seth H. (2003). Speedway to Sunshine: The Story of the Florida East Coast Railway (1st ed.). Boston Mills Press. ISBN 1-55046-358-6.
- Wrinn, Jim (2000). Steam's Camelot: Southern and Norfolk Southern Excursions in Color (1st ed.). TLC Publishing. ISBN 1-883089-56-5.
- Ziel, Ron (1990). Mainline Steam Revival (1st ed.). Amereon House. ISBN 0-8488-0863-0.
