= USRA Light Pacific =

Class of American two-cylinder 4-6-2 locomotives

- Atlantic Coast Line 1504 on static display in Jacksonville, Florida
Type and origin
- Power type: Steam
- Builder: American Locomotive Company (ALCO); Baldwin Locomotive Works (BLW)
- Build date: 1919–1920
- Total produced: 81 original, 234 copies
Specifications
- Configuration
  - Whyte: 4-6-2
  - UIC: 2′C1′ h2
- Gauge: 4 ft 8 1/2 in (1,435 mm)
- Driver dia.: 73 in (1,854 mm)
- Wheelbase: Coupled: 13 ft 0 in (3.96 m); Locomotive: 34 ft 9 in (10.59 m); Loco & tender: 68 ft 7 1/2 in (20.92 m)
- Axle load: 55,000 lb (25,000 kilograms)
- Adhesive weight: 165,000 lb (75,000 kilograms)
- Loco weight: 270,000 lb (120,000 kilograms)
- Tender weight: 188,000 lb (85,000 kilograms)
- Total weight: 414,000 lb (188,000 kilograms)
- Fuel capacity: 16 t (16 long tons; 18 short tons)
- Water cap.: 10,000 US gal (38,000 L; 8,300 imp gal)
- Firebox
  - Grate area: 66.7 sq ft (6.20 m^{2})
- Boiler pressure: 200 psi (1.38 MPa)
- Heating surface
  - Firebox: 234 sq ft (21.7 m^{2})
  - Tubes: 2,091 sq ft (194.3 m^{2})
  - Flues: 981 sq ft (91.1 m^{2})
  - Total surface: 3,333 sq ft (309.6 m^{2})
- Superheater
  - Heating area: 794 sq ft (73.8 m^{2})
- Cylinders: Two, outside
- Cylinder size: 25 in × 28 in (635 mm × 711 mm)
- Valve type: 14-inch (356 mm) piston valves
- Loco brake: Air
- Train brakes: Air
Performance figures
- Tractive effort: 40,750 lbf (181.3 kN)
- Factor of adh.: 4.1
Career
- Retired: 1939-1955 (Original); 1939-1961 (Copies)
- Preserved: Two (Atlantic Coast Line 1504 and Grand Trunk Western 5632)
- Disposition: One original under restoration, one copy on static display, and one tender from a copy in storage, remainder scrapped

The USRA Light Pacific is a USRA standard class of steam locomotive designed under the control of the United States Railroad Administration, the nationalized railroad system in the United States during World War I. It was the standard light passenger locomotive of the USRA types, with a 4-6-2 wheel arrangement in the Whyte notation, or 2′C1′ in UIC classification.

== History ==
A total of 81 locomotives were built under USRA control, and were sent to the following railroads:

Table of original USRA allocation
Railroad	Quantity	Class	Road numbers	Notes	Retired
Atlantic Coast Line Railroad (ACL)	45	P-5-A	1500–1544	25 P-5-As (Nos. 1545-1569) were built by Alco's Richmond Works in 1920, and 165 P-5-Bs (Nos. 1600-1764) were also built as copies between 1920 and 1926 by BLW.	1939-1953
Baltimore and Ohio Railroad (B&O)	30	P-5	5200–5229	Built by BLW (Nos. 5200-5219) and ALCO (Nos. 5220-5229) in 1919.	1951-1955
Louisville and Nashville Railroad (L&N)	6	K-5	240–245	20 copies (Nos. 264-283) built between 1923 and 1924.	1945-1953
Total	81				

After the dissolution of USRA, the ACL and L&N ordered additional copies of the USRA Light Pacific design, while both the Grand Trunk Western Railroad (GTW) and the Mobile and Ohio Railroad (M&O) also ordered copies in the 1920s.

Table of USRA copies
Railroad	Quantity	Class	Road numbers	Notes	Retired
Atlantic Coast Line Railroad (ACL)	25	P-5-A	1545–1569	Continuation of the USRA design after the USRA disbanded.	1939-1953
Atlantic Coast Line Railroad (ACL)	165	P-5-B	1600–1764	P-5-A but with smaller driving wheels and designed for freight traffic.	1950-1953
Grand Trunk Western Railroad (GTW)	5	K-4-a	5627-5631	5629 was formerly preserved but was scrapped in July 1987 due to negligence.	1960-1961
Grand Trunk Western Railroad (GTW)	3	K-4-b	5632-5634	5632 is preserved.	1960-1961
Louisville and Nashville Railroad (L&N)	20	K-5	264–283	Nos. 275 and 277 streamlined. Tender from No. 279 preserved at the Southeastern Railway Museum	1945-1953
Mobile and Ohio Railroad (M&O)	10	N/A	260-269	Built by BLW.	1946-1949
Rutland Railroad (RUT)	6 in total, three in each class	K-1, K2	80-82 and 83-85 respectively	Built by Alco-Schenectady.	1951-1953
Total	234				

== Notable locomotives ==
=== Atlantic Coast Line 1504 ===
No. 1504 is one of seventy USRA Light Pacifics built by ALCO for the Atlantic Coast Line Railroad (ACL). Classified as a P-5-A, No. 1504 had the capability to haul 10-12 passenger cars at 70–80 mph (113–129 km/h) between Richmond, Virginia and Jacksonville, Florida. It was assigned to haul ACL's premier passenger trains such as the Miamian, Florida Special, Palmetto Limited, Southland, South Wind and Dixie Flyer. On December 25, 1952, ACL retired the No. 1504 locomotive from revenue service and put it on static display in front of their headquarters building in Jacksonville, where it became the only USRA Light Pacific steam locomotive preserved in original as-built condition.

In 1986, ACL's successor, CSX donated the No. 1504 locomotive to the Jacksonville City Council, where they relocated it to its new static display site in the parking lot of the Prime F. Osborn III Convention Center, located at the former Jacksonville Union Terminal. In 1990, the No. 1504 locomotive was designated as a National Historic Mechanical Engineering Landmark by the American Society of Mechanical Engineers (ASME). In 2021, the locomotive was purchased by the U.S. Sugar Corporation (USSC) in Clewiston, Florida, where it is being restored to operating condition for use in excursion service on the South Central Florida Express shortline railroad as part of USSC's heritage tourist passenger train named the Sugar Express.

=== Grand Trunk Western 5629 ===
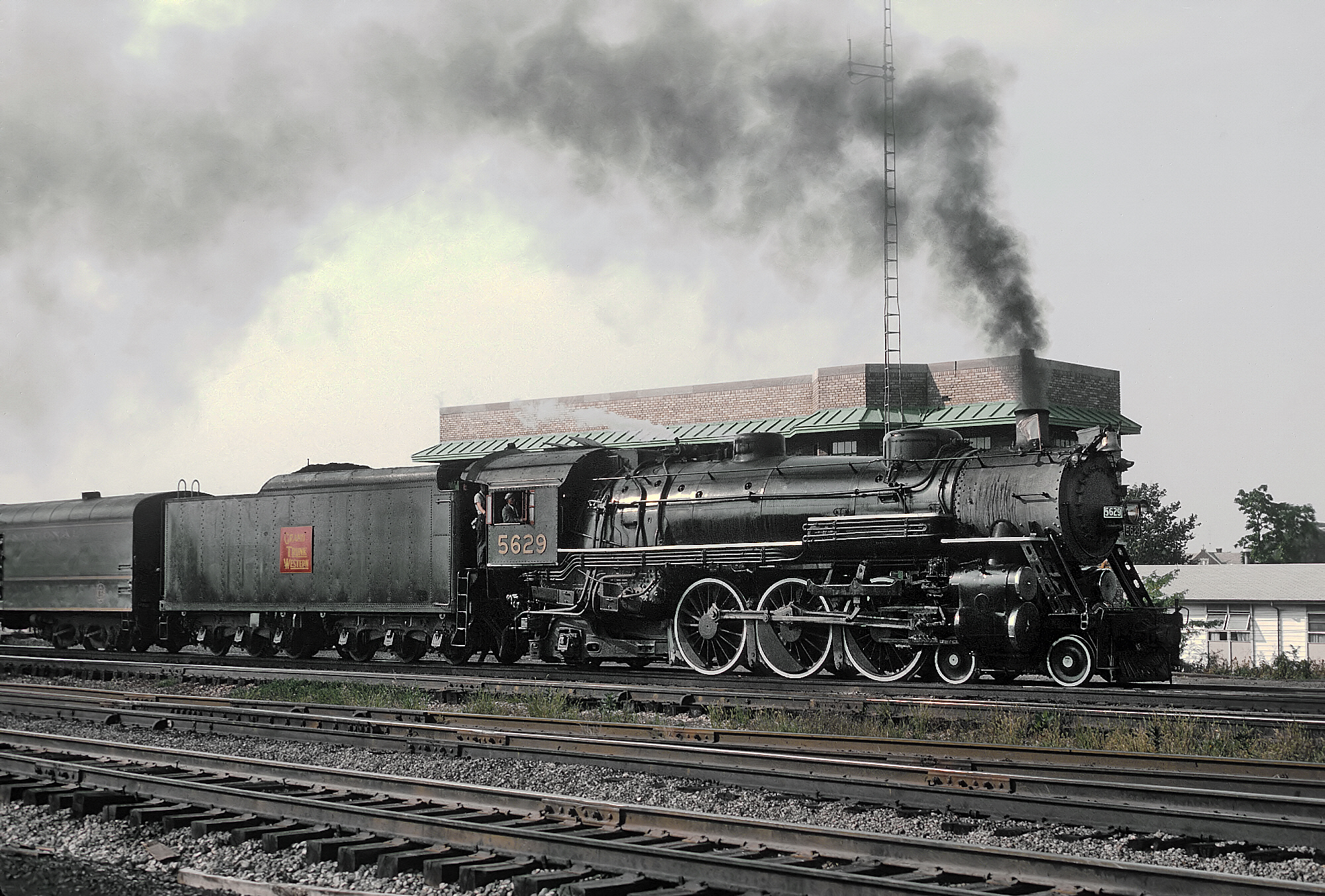
Grand Trunk Western No. 5629 pulling a fantrip excursion towards South Bend, Indiana Union Station, 1967

No. 5629 was one of five copies (Nos. 5627-5631) of the USRA Light Pacifics built in 1924 by ALCO for the Grand Trunk Western (GTW). Classified as a K-4-a, No. 5629 was assigned to pull commuter trains throughout the Lower Peninsula of Michigan. In 1960, the locomotive was purchased by Richard Jensen, who subsequently restored it to pull excursion trains on the Baltimore and Ohio Chicago Terminal Railroad (B&OCT). It was initially stored at a Baltimore and Ohio (B&O) roundhouse in Hammond, Indiana before Jensen moved it to another roundhouse, which was owned by the Chicago and Western Indiana Railroad (C&WI). No. 5629 was refitted with a larger ex-Soo Line tender to pull long-distance excursions throughout the Chicago metropolitan area and the state of Indiana. (Note: At one point, Southern Railway (SOU) president W. Graham Claytor offered to purchase No. 5629 for use on the SOU steam excursion program while cosmetically altered to resemble the Southern Railway Ps-4 class. However, Jensen declined, believing his locomotive was too expensive to be purchased.)

In the early 1970s, Jensen was running into some financial trouble, due to legal issues with the C&WI and a loss of access to nearby railroads, and he lost all motivation to operate steam excursions. No. 5629 would be stored in Penn Central's yard outside of Chicago Union Station, until Jensen searched for another location to store the locomotive. He subsequently reached an agreement with the Rock Island Railroad (RI) to store it within the Burr Oak freight yard at Blue Island, Illinois, but he never paid rent that was owed to the railroad.

In March 1980, the RI went bankrupt, and Metra acquired the Burr Oak yard. They ordered Jensen to move No. 5629 out of their yard, but upon inspecting it to be moved, he discovered that it was vandalized during its time stored in Blue Island. Upon hearing about No. 5629's current condition, Metra wanted to help Jenson, who actually subsequently formulated a plan to allow them to scrap the No. 5629 locomotive, leading to him suing Metra to gain a million dollars.

After Jensen refused to assist removing his locomotive from the Burr Oak yard, Metra went to court, who ordered Metra to scrap the No. 5629 locomotive as the only alternative solution. Many groups, such as the Illinois Railway Museum, offered to purchase the locomotive for $15,000 and move it out of harm's way, but Jensen declined and instead removed No. 5629's journal boxes to prevent the locomotive from being moved out of the Blue Island freight yard. On June 14, 1987, the court ordered Metra to scrap No. 5629 and the railroad reluctantly contacted the Erman-Howell Division of the Luria Brothers Scrap Company to dispose of the locomotive around July. After the scrapping, Jensen sued Metra as planned, but he eventually lost the case.

=== Grand Trunk Western 5632 ===
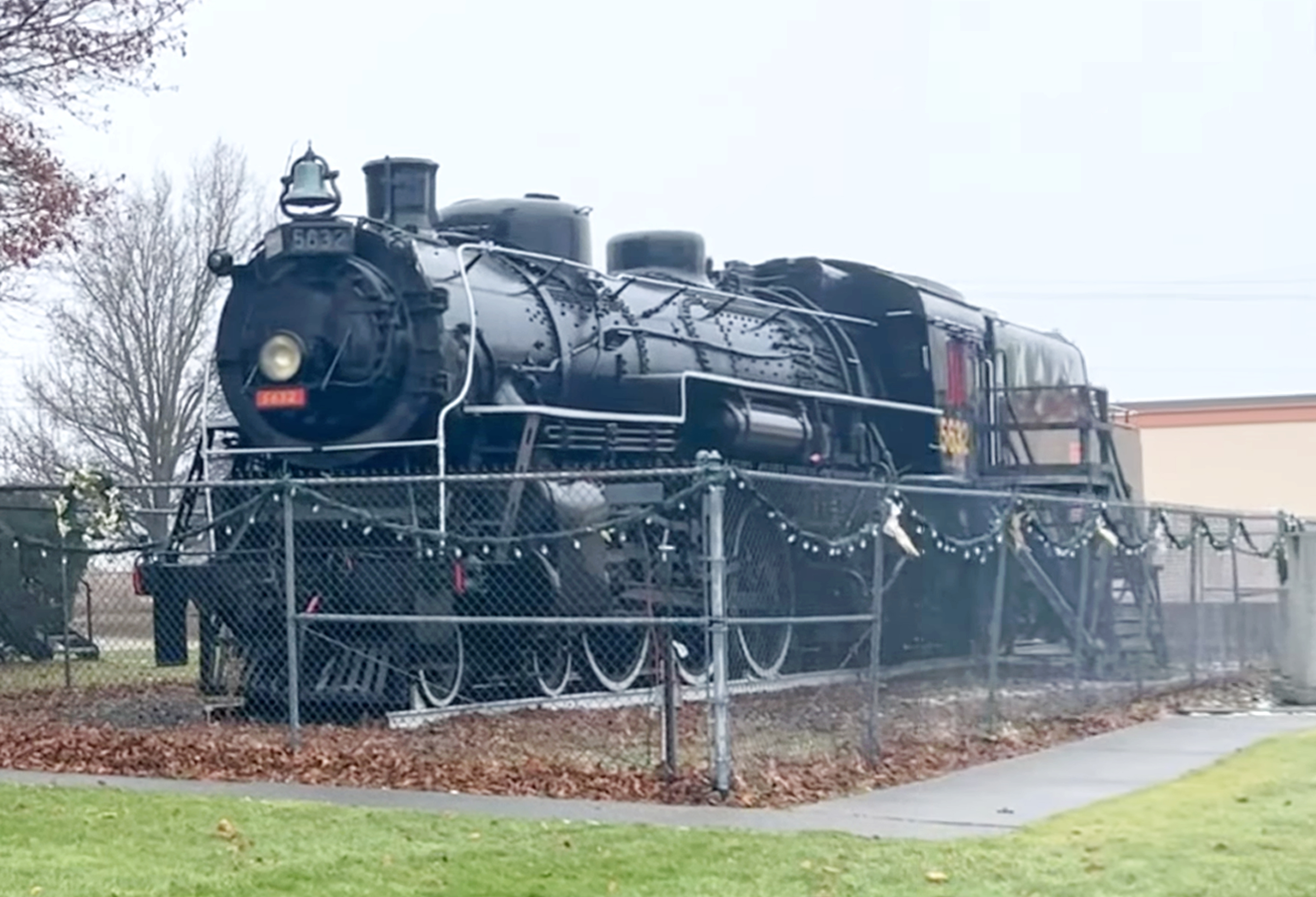
Grand Trunk Western 5632 sitting on static display at Durand, Michigan.

No. 5632 was one of three K-4-b class 4-6-2's (Nos. 5632-5634) constructed by the Baldwin Locomotive Works of Eddystone, Pennsylvania in November 1929, and it was delivered to the Grand Trunk Western Railroad (GTW) in 1930. The K-4-b locomotives were follow-ups to the K-4-a class (Nos. 5627-5631). The only difference from the USRA design is that the K-4-b class was equipped with an all-weather vestibule cab and an enclosed coffin feedwater heater. The GTW ordered the K-4-b's from Baldwin to use them for their sleeper trains—the Chicago Express and the Detroit Express—between Chicago, Illinois and Detroit, Michigan, in competition with the Michigan Central (MC), but both trains were quickly discontinued, due to challenges from the Great Depression.

No. 5632 was subsequently reassigned to pull regular passenger trains in the GTW's Chicago Division between Chicago and Port Huron, Michigan alongside the K-4-a's. In 1938, when the GTW received six streamlined U-4-b class 4-8-4 locomotives, No. 5632 was relegated to the GTW's Detroit Division, where it was reassigned again to pull commuter trains between Detroit and Muskegon. The K-4-b last operated for the GTW on June 13, 1958, before it was retired from revenue service. In August 1960, the GTW donated No. 5632 to the city of Durand, Michigan. The following year, in 1961, the K-4-b was put on static display near the GTW mainline in Durand, and a dedication ceremony was held on May 20.

== Accidents and incidents ==
- On May 28, 1930, Grand Trunk Western 5632 pulled the eleven-car Inter-City Limited train from Port Huron to Chicago, but at the GTW's Belsay yards in Flint, while traveling at 60 to 65 miles per hour (97 to 105 km/h), the locomotive hit an open switch, leaped upward, and toppled onto its side, with nine of its passenger and mail cars derailing behind it. Engineer Arthur Morden and fireman Clyde Pierce were both killed upon impact, while some of the crew in the derailed cars were severely injured—passengers only received minor injuries, since some of the derailed cars between them and the locomotive were empty.

== Bibliography ==
- Blaszak, Michael W.; Solomon, Brian; Gruber, John; Gruss, Chris (2014). Chicago: America's Railroad Capital: The Illustrated History, 1836 to Today (2nd ed.). Voyageur Press. ISBN 978-0-7603-4603-7.
- Drury, George (2015). Guide to North American Steam Locomotives, Revised Edition (2nd ed.). Kalmbach Publishing. ISBN 978-1-62700-259-2.
- Huddleston, Eugene L. (2002). Uncle Sam's Locomotives: The USRA and the Nation's Railroads (1st ed.). Indiana University Press. ISBN 0-253-34086-1.
- Ziel, Ron (1990). Mainline Steam Revival (1st ed.). Amereon House. ISBN 0-8488-0863-0.
- Hubbard, Freeman (1965). Railroadman's Magazine - Volumes 77-78. Popular Publications, Inc.
- Ingles, David (2001). Guide to North American Railroad Hot Spots. Kalmbach Books. ISBN 0890243735.
- Dorin, Patrick C. (1977). The Grand Trunk Western Railroad: A Canadian National Railway (1st ed.). Superior Publishing Company. ISBN 0-87564-526-7.
- Meints, Graydon (1987). 150 Years of Michigan's Railroad History. Michigan Department of Transportation.
- Kean, Randolph (1973). The Railfan's Guide to Museum & Park Displays. H. E. Cox.
- Edwin, Alexander (1976). Bancroft - Durand - Lennon - Vernon Heritage 1976. Durand Area Bicentennial Commission.
- Agreement Between Grand Trunk Western Railroad Company and Employees Represented by Brotherhood of Locomotive Firemen and Enginemen. Grand Trunk Western Railroad Company. 1944.
- Solomon, Brian (1929). Baldwin Locomotives - Volume 8. Baldwin Locomotive Works.
