= Atlantic Coast Line 1504 =

Preserved ACL P-5-A class 4-6-2 locomotive

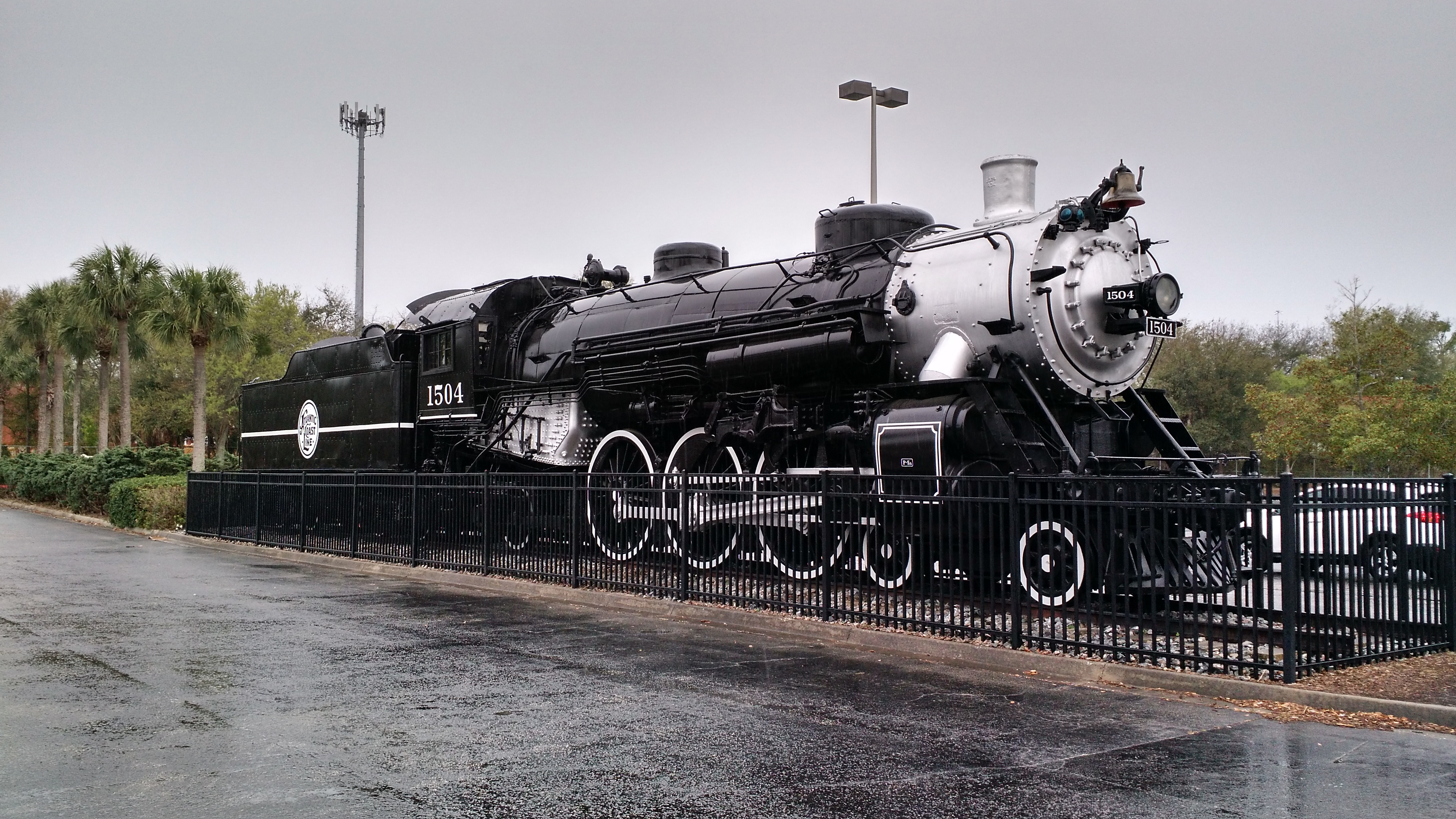
- Atlantic Coast Line No. 1504 on static display in Jacksonville, Florida, in 2016.
Type and origin
- Power type: Steam
- Builder: American Locomotive Company (Richmond Works)
- Serial number: 59314
- Build date: March 1919
Specifications
- Configuration
  - Whyte: 4-6-2
  - UIC: 2′C1′ h1
- Gauge: 4 ft 8 1/2 in (1,435 mm) standard gauge
- Driver dia.: 73 in (1,854 mm)
- Wheelbase: Loco & tender: 70.79 ft (21.58 m)
- Length: 80 ft 9.5 in (24.63 m)
- Axle load: 59,333 lb (26,913 kilograms; 26.913 metric tons)
- Adhesive weight: 178,000 lb (81,000 kilograms; 81 metric tons)
- Loco weight: 278,000 lb (126,000 kilograms; 126 metric tons)
- Tender weight: 193,000 lb (88,000 kilograms; 88 metric tons)
- Total weight: 471,000 lb (214,000 kilograms; 214 metric tons)
- Tender type: USRA
- Fuel type: Coal
- Fuel capacity: 16 t (16 long tons; 18 short tons)
- Water cap.: 10,000 US gal (38,000 L; 8,300 imp gal)
- Firebox
  - Grate area: 66.70 sq ft (6.197 m^{2})
- Boiler pressure: 200 psi (1.38 MPa)
- Heating surface
  - Firebox: 242 sq ft (22.5 m^{2})
- Superheater
  - Heating area: 794 sq ft (73.8 m^{2})
- Cylinders: Two, outside
- Cylinder size: 25 in × 28 in (635 mm × 711 mm)
- Valve gear: Baker
- Valve type: Piston valves
- Loco brake: Air
- Train brakes: Air
- Couplers: Knuckle
Performance figures
- Maximum speed: 70 mph (110 km/h)
- Tractive effort: 40,750 lbf (181.27 kN)
- Factor of adh.: 4.12
Career
- Operators: Atlantic Coast Line
- Class: P-5-A
- Number in class: 5th of 70
- Numbers: ACL 497; ACL 1504
- Retired: December 31, 1952
- Preserved: 1953
- Current owner: Tennessee Valley Railroad Museum
- Disposition: In storage
- Atlantic Coast Line Railroad Locomotive No. 1504
- U.S. National Register of Historic Places
- Location: 2202 N Chamberlain Avenue Chattanooga, Tennessee
- Built: 1919
- Built by: American Locomotive Company
- NRHP reference No.: 100001388
- Added to NRHP: January 23, 2018

Atlantic Coast Line 1504 is a 4-6-2 "Pacific" type steam locomotive, built in March 1919 by the American Locomotive Company (ALCO) of Richmond, Virginia, for the Atlantic Coast Line Railroad (ACL) as a member of the P-5-A class under the United States Railroad Administration (USRA) standard. No. 1504 was assigned to pull ACL's premier mainline passenger trains during the 1920s to early 40s and even secondary passenger trains and mainline freight trains in the late 1940s until it was retired from revenue service at the end of 1952.

In 1960, No. 1504 was put on display in Jacksonville, Florida as the only original USRA Light Pacific steam locomotive to be preserved. In 1990, it was designated as a National Historic Mechanical Engineering Landmark by the American Society of Mechanical Engineers (ASME). No. 1504 was cosmetically restored three times in 1989, 1998, and 2015.

Around 2021, the No. 1504 locomotive was sold to U.S. Sugar (USSC) with plans to originally restore it to operating condition for use in excursion service on the South Central Florida Express (SCFE) shortline railroad in Clewiston, Florida as part of their heritage tourist passenger train named the Sugar Express. However, in 2026, plans were changed and No. 1504 was donated to the Tennessee Valley Railroad Museum (TVRM) in Chattanooga, Tennessee.

== History ==
=== Design and capabilities ===
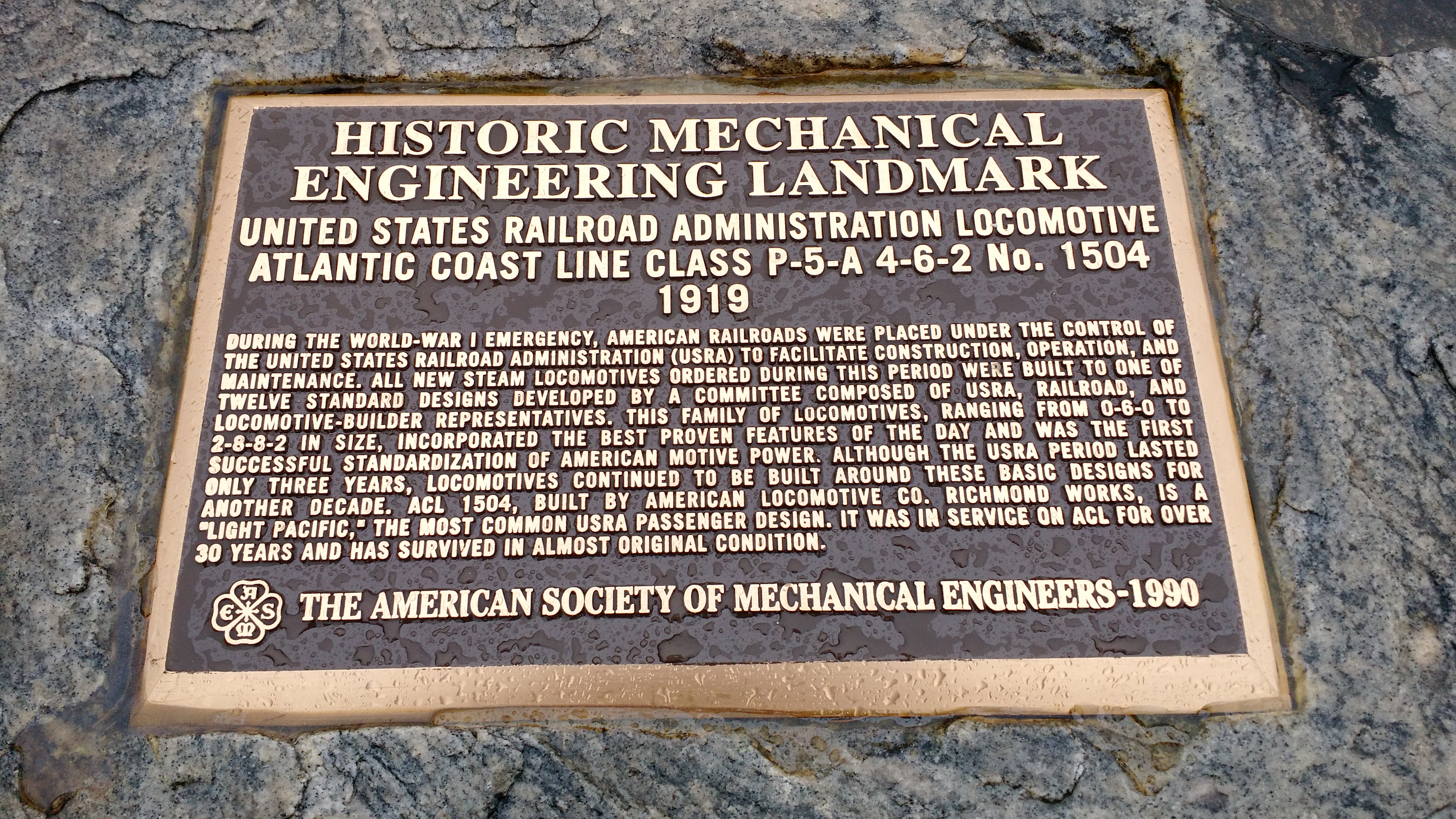
No. 1504's ASME plaque in 2016.

No. 1504 was the fifth member of 70 United States Railroad Administration (USRA) Light Pacifics built by the American Locomotive Company (ALCO) between 1919 and 1920 for the Atlantic Coast Line Railroad (ACL), where they served as ACL's primary mainline passenger steam locomotives. Originally classified as a P-5 and numbered 497 as part of the first batches (Nos. 493-502), it was reclassified as a P-5-A and renumbered to 1504 in 1920, while Nos. 493-496 and 498-502 were renumbered to 1500-1503 and 1505-1509, respectively.

Designed with 25 in × 28 in (635 mm × 711 mm) cylinders and 73 in (1,854 mm) driving wheels, No. 1504 and the P-5-As were able to produce 47,535 lbf (211.45 kN) of tractive effort, which allowed them to haul 10-12 passenger cars at more than 70 mph (113 km/h). Their tender was equipped with a coal pusher, which was operated by steam to push the coal for the fireman shoveling it into the firebox. Additionally, it holds 16 tonnes (35,000 lb) of coal and 10,000 US gallons (38,000 L) of water. While some of the P-5-A locomotives were upgraded with Worthington feedwater heaters, disc driving wheels, and larger tenders to improve their performances, No. 1504 was one of the few that were not upgraded with these features.

=== Revenue service ===
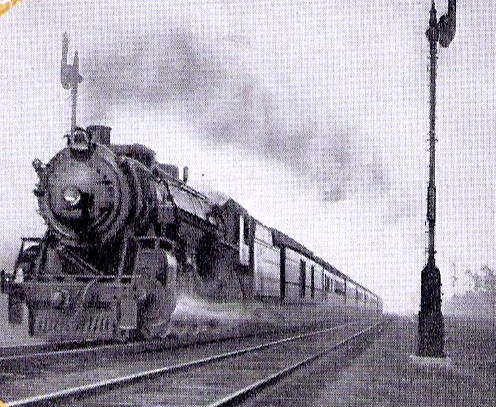
One of No. 1504's sister locomotives pulling the Palmetto Limited in the 1930s.

No. 1504 and the P-5-As hauled the Coast Line Florida Mail, (Note: In 1944, the train was shortened to the Florida Mail.) Florida Special, Everglades, Havana Special, Miamian, Palmetto Limited, (Note: In 1944, the train was renamed to the Palmetto.) Vacationer, and West Indian Limited passenger trains, running 645 miles (1,038 km) on the ACL mainline between Richmond, Virginia and Jacksonville, Florida. Additionally, they pulled the Dixie Flyer between Albany, Georgia and Jacksonville; and the Southland between Albany and Tampa, Florida. Occasionally, No. 1504 would pull connecting passenger trains Nos. 50-51 between Florence, South Carolina and Augusta, Georgia.

In the early morning of December 24, 1925, No. 1504 was pulling the southbound West Indian Limited train No. 85. But upon approaching Moncks Corner, South Carolina, it collided head-on with sister locomotive No. 1538, who was sent down the wrong line with the northbound Havana Special train No. 76. Both of their engineer and fireman were killed, while 28 passengers were injured. The accident was caused by an error of delivering train orders. Despite being severely damaged, both locomotives were repaired and put back into active service. (Note: No. 1538 would later be retired and sold for scrap on January 31, 1950.)

During the mid 1930s, No. 1504 and the P-5-As were required to double head each other with ACL's passenger trains consist, which became longer and heavier with more than 12 passenger cars added due to the increased traffic of passengers traveling to Florida and ACL competing against the Seaboard Air Line (SAL) and Southern (SOU) railroads. (Note: This led to ACL ordering 12 powerful 4-8-4 R-1 class locomotives (Nos. 1800-1811) from the Baldwin Locomotive Works in Philadelphia, Pennsylvania.) During late 1939 and early 1940, they were soon found to be capable of handling the Miamian from Richmond to Jacksonville in 11 hours and 25 minutes via all cutoffs, providing an average speed of 56.5 mph (91 km/h). At the same time, when ACL began to dieselize its Richmond-Jacksonville passenger trains with EMD E3s and E6s. No. 1504 was reassigned to secondary passenger runs in Florida, including the Tampa Special between Jacksonville and Tampa, via Sanford, Orlando, and Lakeland. Additionally, it pulled two crack Montgomery-Jacksonville passenger trains; the Florida Arrow and the South Wind, which ran via Thomasville and Waycross, Georgia.

Sometime after 1940, the locomotive's tender was repainted from its original Roman style ATLANTIC COAST LINE lettering to ACL's new circular herald logo with white stripe. By 1946, No. 1504 pulled the Gulf Coast Limited passenger trains between Jacksonville and St. Petersburg, Florida, via Burnett's Lake, Gainesville, Ocala, Leesburg, and Trilby. In their twilight years of service, the locomotive and the other P-5-As hauled 50-60 freight cars on mainline time freight trains at maximum allowable speeds. On December 31, 1952, No. 1504 was officially retired from revenue service and put in storage at Fitzgerald, Georgia. It was also one of the last P-5-As to be written off of ACL's operating locomotive roster.

=== Preservation ===
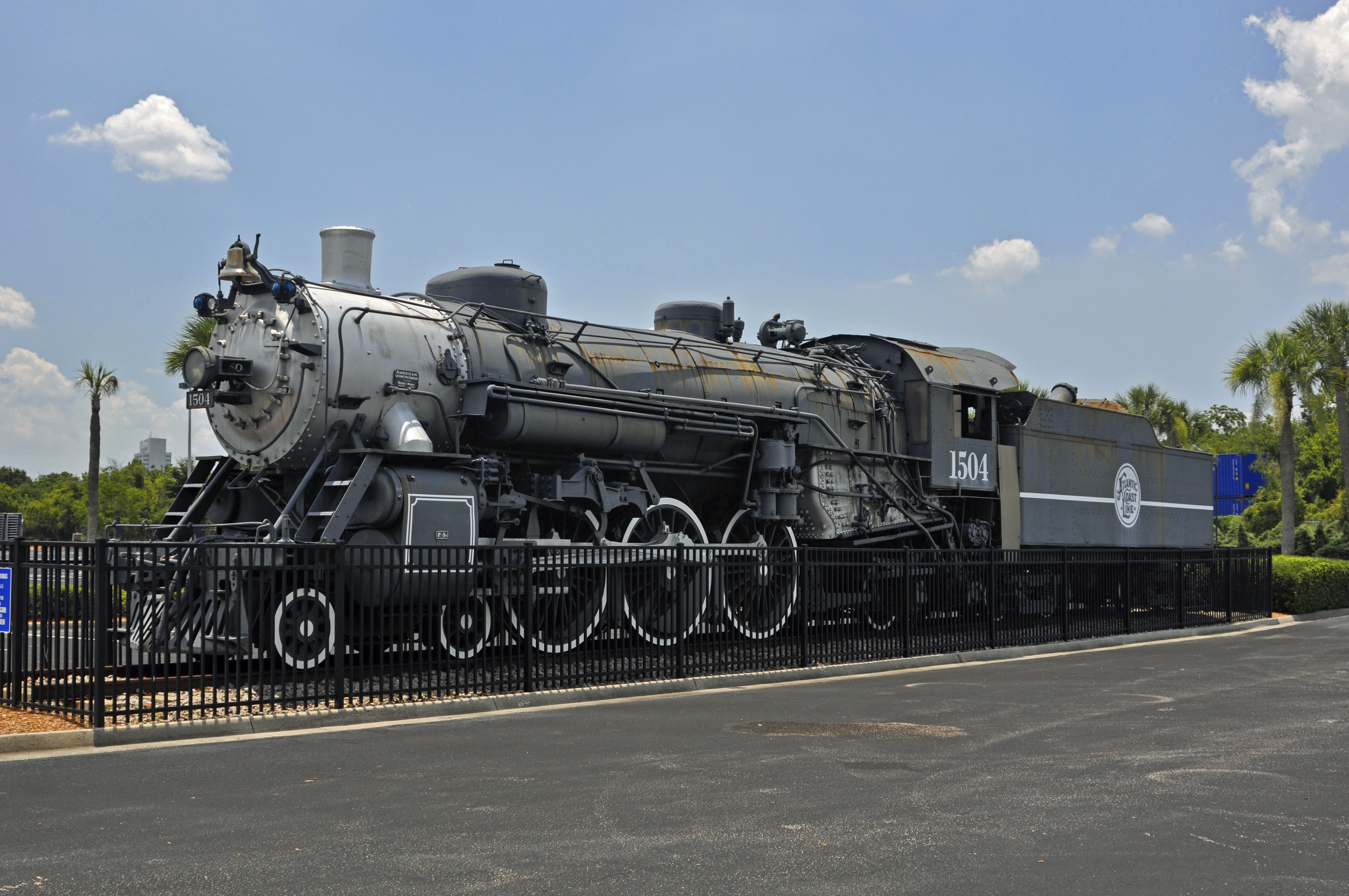
No. 1504 on static display with faded black paint in 2009 prior to its cosmetic restoration in 2015.

In 1953, ACL president Champion Davis and ACL mechanical department manager John W. Hawthorne salvaged No. 1504 for preservation since it was left in mechanically good condition. The locomotive was moved to ACL's Uceta Yard Shops in Tampa, Florida, where it was repainted and put on display near the shops. Additionally, it was the only USRA Light Pacific steam locomotive to be preserved in original as-built condition, excluding its headlight, tender trucks, and pilot wheels. In 1956, No. 1504's tender received another repaint with ACL's new circular herald logo, which had ACL's six serving states wrapped around the logo and commonly used on ACL's diesel locomotives. In May 1960, No. 1504 was removed from its Uceta Shops display and moved to Jacksonville to be on display next to ACL's new headquarter building. By the mid-1960s, No. 1504's tender was repainted back to its original pre-1940s Roman style letterings.

In late September 1986, ACL's successor, CSX donated the No. 1504 locomotive to the Jacksonville City Council, where they relocated it to its new display site in the parking lot of the Prime F. Osborn III Convention Center, located at the former Jacksonville Union Terminal. No. 1504 had to be slid on greased rails and shipped via truck trailer, since multiple parts of its running gear had been welded to make the locomotive immobile for display. In 1989, the North Florida Chapter of the National Railway Historical Society repainted No. 1504 into its 1940s livery with the correct ACL steam era herald logo. Additionally, the locomotive had its asbestos boiler lagging removed and a new boiler cladding installed at a cost of $75,000. On October 23, 1990, No. 1504 was designated as a National Historic Mechanical Engineering Landmark and presented with a plaque by the American Society of Mechanical Engineers (ASME). It received another renovation at $10,000 in 1998.

In July 2013, the North Florida Chapter NRHS launched the Project Return to Glory group to fund the cosmetic restoration of the No. 1504 locomotive, which had been sitting on display with faded paint due to its exposure to the elements. When No. 1504 was being inspected, it was discovered to be in fair condition, but its tender was in very poor condition. In late October 2013, the North Florida Chapter NRHS received $10,000 from Trains Magazine and an additional $10,000 from CSX Corporation with a total of $20,000. The cosmetic restoration work would include adding new cab windows and doors, and renovating the headlamp. In July 2015, the Project Return to Glory group volunteers finished cosmetically restoring the No. 1504 locomotive with new paint. Despite the successful cosmetic restoration, No. 1504 still does not have a shelter to be protected from the elements. On January 23, 2018, No. 1504 was listed on the National Register of Historic Places.

In June 2021, the Jacksonville City Council donated the No. 1504 locomotive to the North Florida Chapter NRHS, who in turn sold the locomotive for $50,000 to U.S. Sugar Corporation (USSC) for use in excursion service alongside U.S. Sugar 148 on the South Central Florida Express (SCFE) shortline railroad in Clewiston, Florida as part of USSC's Sugar Express tourist passenger train. In late August 2021, No. 1504 was disassembled from static display and moved to the former Lucey Boiler Company building in Chattanooga, Tennessee, the same place where Southern Railway 4501 was originally restored in the mid 1960s. It was about to go under an extensive restoration and rebuild performed by FMW Solutions. (Note: The plan was to have the locomotive's deteriorated tender body replaced by a new one with original specifications and conversion to burn recycled cooking oil fuel instead of coal. No. 1504's driving wheels were sent to be repaired at the Tennessee Valley Railroad Museum (TVRM), which was also located in Chattanooga.) On March 24, 2026, it was announced by USSC that they donated No. 1504 to the Tennessee Valley Railroad Museum (TVRM), citing rising raw material and labor costs, and they had determined that No. 148 was sufficient for their steam operations. TVRM stated that the disassembled locomotive will be placed into storage, with plans for either display or operational restoration to be determined at a later date.

== See also ==
- Atlantic Coast Line 501
- Atlanta and West Point 290
- Baltimore and Ohio 4500
- Baltimore and Ohio 5300
- Grand Trunk Western 5629
- Maine Central 470
- Norfolk and Western 578
- Norfolk and Western 611
- Pennsylvania Railroad 1361
- Southern Railway 1401

== Bibliography ==
- Bryant Jr., H. Stafford (1962). The Georgian Locomotive (1st ed.). Weathervane. OCLC 3004841.
- Goolsby, Larry (1999). Atlantic Coast Line Passenger Service: The Postwar Years (1st ed.). TLC Publishing. ISBN 978-1-883089-45-0.
- Goolsby, Larry (2019). "Atlantic Coast Line 1504 Turns 100". Lines South. Vol. 36, no. 4. ACL & SAL Railroads Historical Society. pp. 28–37.
- Huddleston, Eugene L. (2002). Uncle Sam's Locomotives: The USRA and the Nation's Railroads (1st ed.). Indiana University Press. ISBN 0-253-34086-1.
- Prince, Richard E. (1966). Atlantic Coast Line Railroad: Steam Locomotives, Ships, and History (1st ed.). Wheelwright Lithographing Company. SBN 9600088-2-9.
- Tillotson Jr., Curt (2000). Classic Steam Trains of the South (1st ed.). TLC Publishing. ISBN 1-883089-55-7.
