= Bryant, Florida =

- Unincorporated community
- Location within Florida
- Coordinates: 26°50′59″N 80°36′59″W
- Country: United States
- State: Florida
- County: Palm Beach
- Elevation: 13 ft (4.0 m)
- Time zone: UTC-5 (Eastern (EST))
  - Summer (DST): UTC-4 (EDT)
- ZIP code: 33439
- Area code: 561
- GNIS feature ID: 279532

Bryant is an unincorporated community in Palm Beach County, Florida, United States. Bryant is located on State Road 700 near Lake Okeechobee, 3.5 miles (5.6 km) northeast of Pahokee. Bryant had a post office with ZIP code 33438.

U.S. Sugar operated the Bryant Sugar House mill in Bryant. The mill closed in 2007, and the town was taken over by the federal government in 2011 and demolished in 2016.

Over time, Bryant would essentially be considered a northeastern suburb of Pahokee.

== Gallery ==
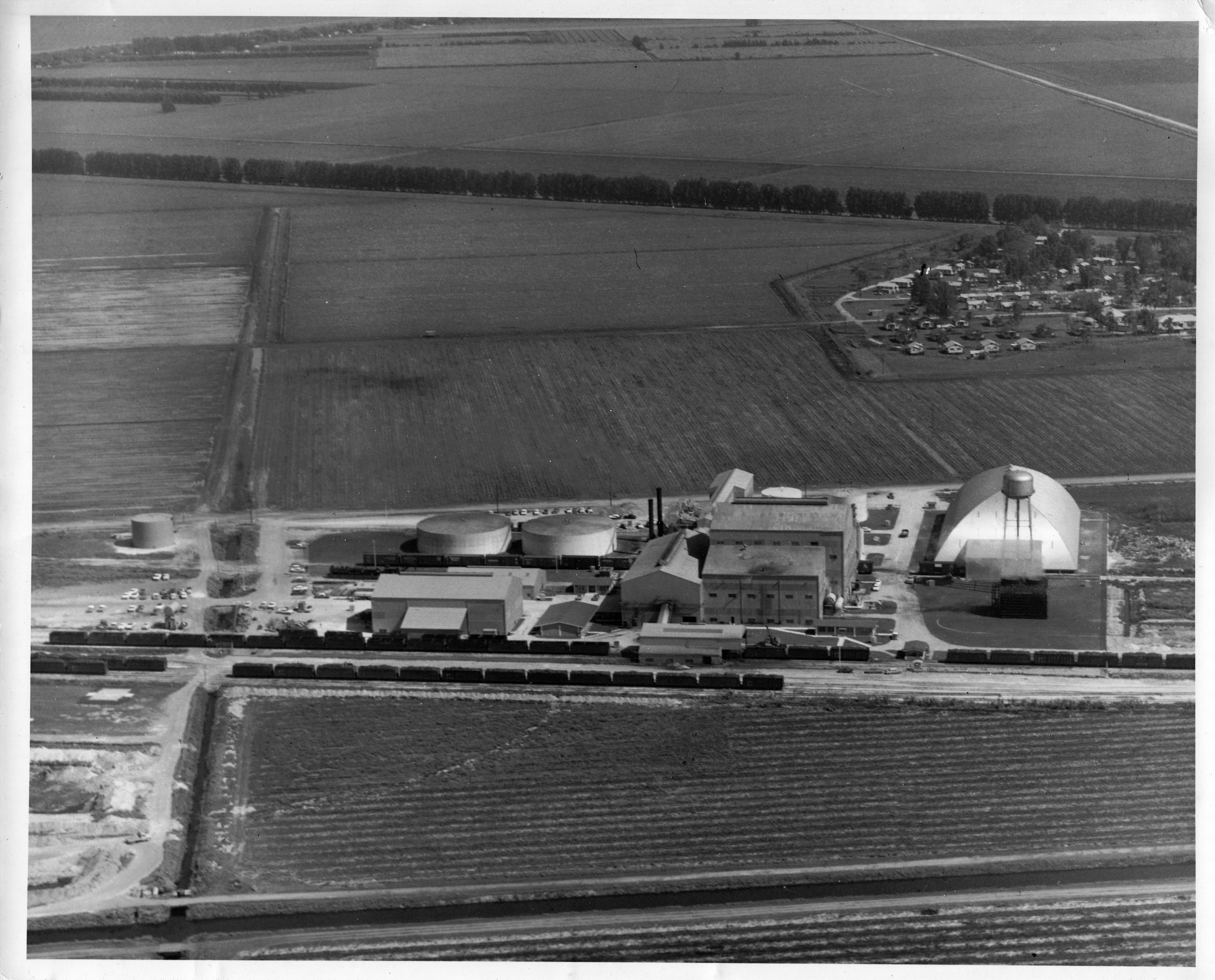
Aerial view of USSC Bryant Sugar House, Bryant, Florida, March, 1963
