= U.S. Sugar 148 =

Preserved American 4-6-2 steam locomotive based in Florida

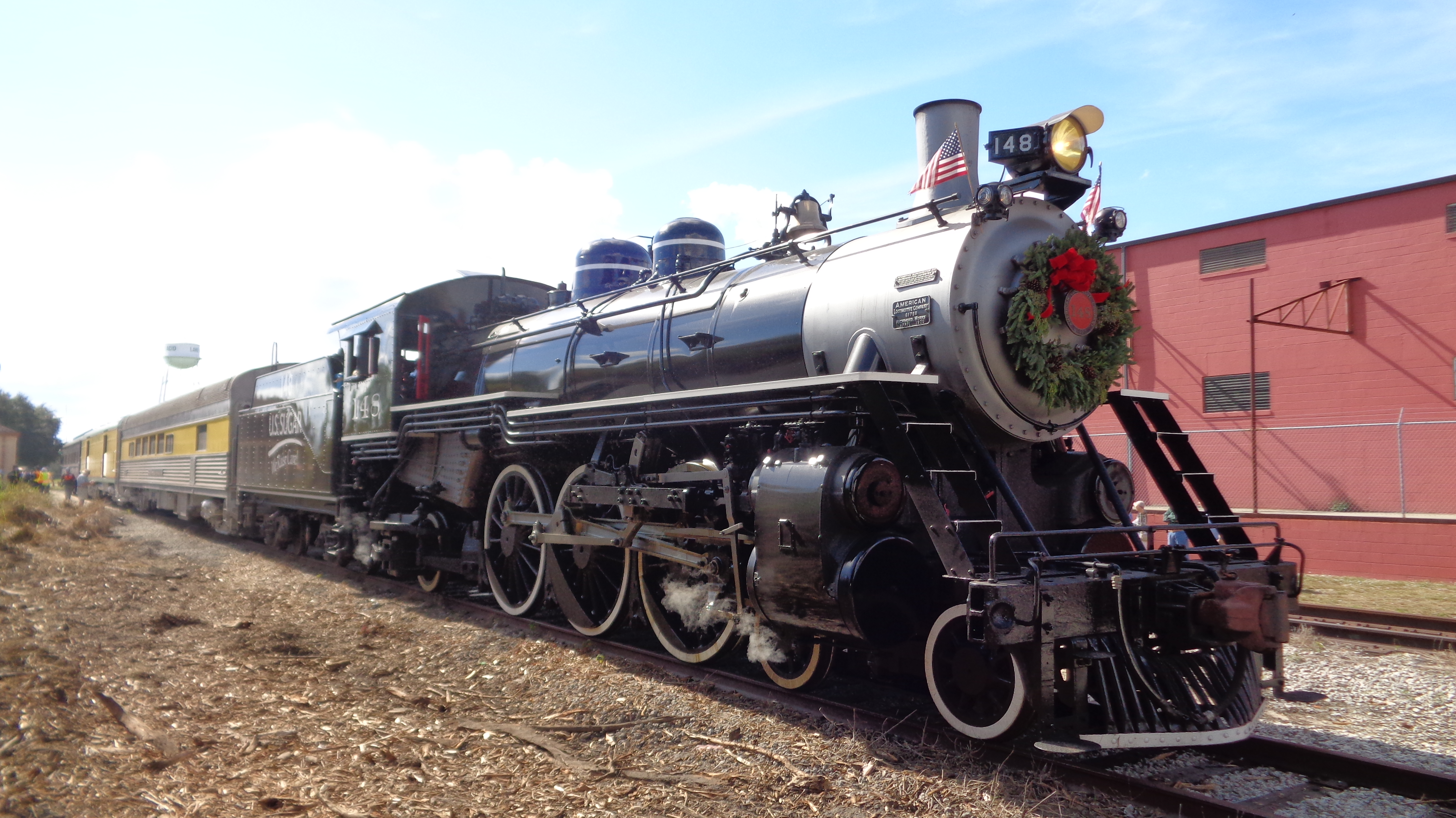
- U.S. Sugar No. 148 with the inaugural Sugar Express excursion train in Lake Placid, Florida, in December 2021.
Type and origin
- Power type: Steam
- Builder: American Locomotive Company (Richmond Works)
- Serial number: 61769
- Build date: April 1920
Specifications
- Configuration
  - Whyte: 4-6-2
  - UIC: 2′C1′ h
- Gauge: 4 ft 8 1/2 in (1,435 mm) standard gauge
- Driver dia.: 68 in (1,727 mm)
- Adhesive weight: 126,500 lb (57.4 tonnes)
- Loco weight: 204,000 lb (92.5 tonnes)
- Tender weight: 162,000 lb (73.5 tonnes)
- Total weight: 366,000 lb (166.0 tonnes)
- Fuel type: New: Bunker C oil; Now: Recycled vegetable oil
- Fuel capacity: 3,500 US gallons (13,000 L)
- Water cap.: 7,300 US gallons (28,000 L)
- Firebox
  - Grate area: 47.1 sq ft (4.4 m^{2})
- Boiler: 66 5/8 in (1,692 mm)
- Boiler pressure: 180 psi (1.24 MPa)
- Heating surface
  - Firebox: 160 sq ft (14.9 m^{2})
- Superheater
  - Heating area: 440 sq ft (40.9 m^{2})
- Cylinders: Two, outside
- Cylinder size: 22 in × 26 in (559 mm × 660 mm)
- Valve gear: Walschaerts
- Valve type: 11-inch (279 mm) piston valves
- Loco brake: Air
- Train brakes: Air
- Couplers: Knuckle
Performance figures
- Maximum speed: 70 mph (113 km/h)
- Tractive effort: 28,314 lbf (125.95 kN)
- Factor of adh.: 4.47
Career
- Operators: Florida East Coast Railway (1920–1952); U.S. Sugar Corporation (1952–1968, 2020–present); Black River and Western Railroad (1971–1973); Morristown and Erie Railway (1974–1977)
- Class: 141
- Number in class: 8 of 10
- Numbers: FEC 148; USSC 148; BRW 148
- Delivered: June 1920
- Retired: 1968 (revenue service); 1977 (1st excursion service)
- Restored: 1970 (1st restoration); April 2020 (2nd restoration)
- Current owner: U.S. Sugar Corporation
- Disposition: Operational

U.S. Sugar 148, formerly Florida East Coast 148, is a 141 class 4-6-2 "Pacific" type steam locomotive, built in April 1920 by the American Locomotive Company (ALCO) of Richmond, Virginia, originally for the Florida East Coast Railway (FEC). It hauled passenger and freight trains between Jacksonville and Miami, Florida, including FEC's Overseas Railroad to Key West, Florida until the line was destroyed in 1935. The locomotive was sold in 1952 to U.S. Sugar Corporation to haul sugarcane trains in Clewiston, Florida.

During the 1970s, No. 148 was sold again to New Jersey, where it served excursion service on the Black River and Western (BRW) and Morristown and Erie (ME) railroads until it became inoperable in 1977. Between 1983 and 2005, the locomotive was sold multiple times to various different owners in Connecticut, Michigan, and Colorado who have attempted to restore No. 148 to operation but never succeeded.

In late 2016, USSC reacquired the No. 148 locomotive and restored it to operating condition by 2020 for use in excursion service on their South Central Florida Express (SCXF) shortline railroad as part of their heritage tourist passenger train named the Sugar Express, touring visitors all around the Lake Okeechobee counties in the Florida Heartland.

== History ==
=== Revenue service on the FEC and U.S. Sugar ===
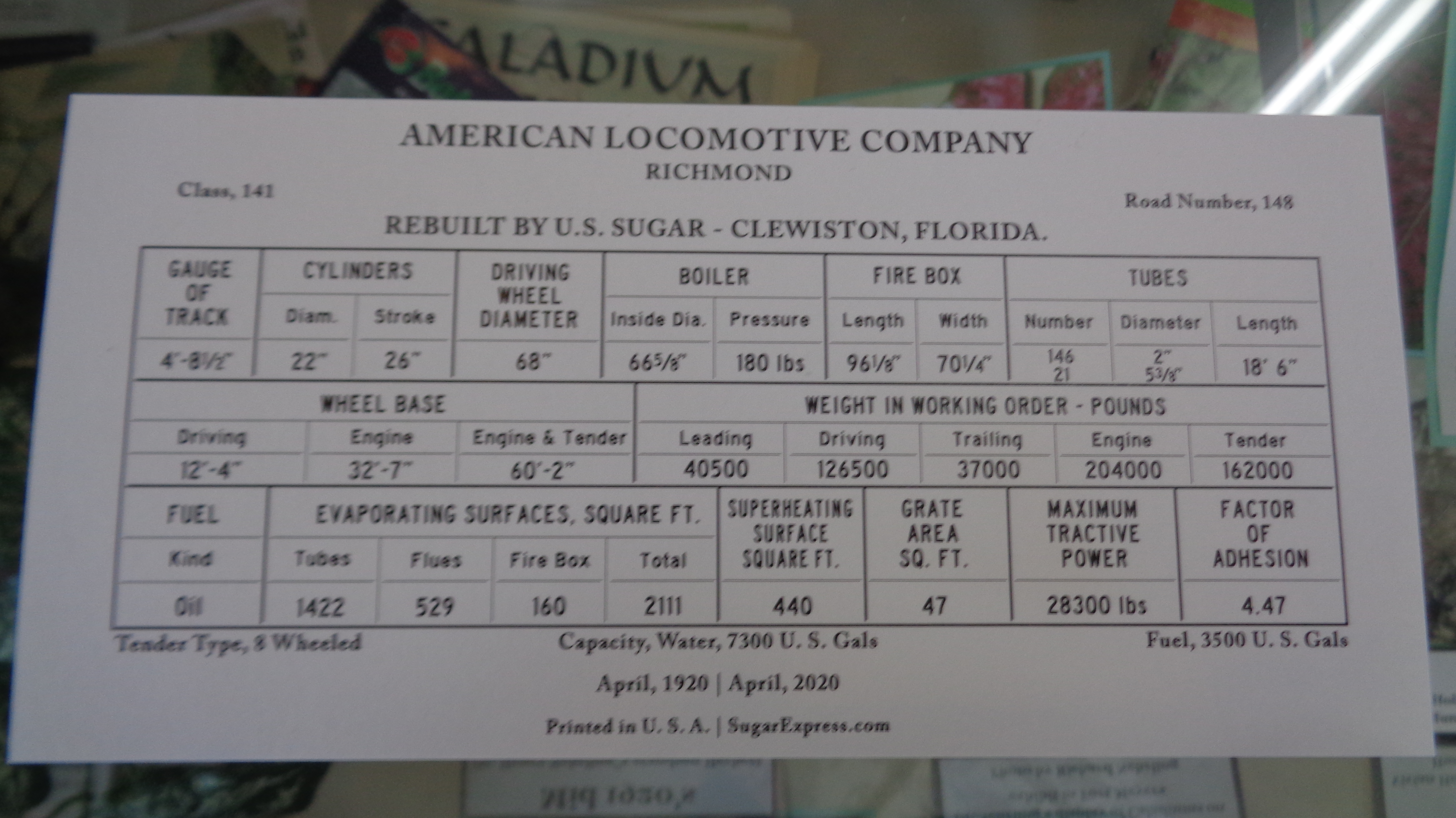
The statistic information of U.S. Sugar No. 148.

No. 148 was the eighth member of ten 4-6-2 Light Pacific class 141 steam locomotives (Nos. 141–150) built by American Locomotive Company of Richmond, Virginia in April 1920, and delivered to the Florida East Coast Railway (FEC) two months later. Designed with 68 in (1,727 mm) driving wheels, No. 148 was capable enough to reach 70 mph (113 km/h). The locomotive was assigned to haul passenger and freight trains between Jacksonville and Miami, Florida. It also ran on FEC's Overseas Railroad between Miami and Key West, Florida until 1935 when the Labor Day Hurricane destroyed many of the route's long bridges and FEC permanently closed it down due to the Great Depression. During that time, FEC began to retire most of their older 4-6-2 locomotives for scrap or selling them to other railroads in order to recoup their financial losses. No. 148 remained in service with FEC until June 1952, when it was sold to U.S. Sugar Corporation (USSC) in Clewiston, Florida, where it worked alongside its fellow locomotives Nos. 98, 113, and 153 to haul sugarcane trains from the harvest field to USSC's sugarcane mills.

=== Excursion service in New Jersey and ownership changes ===
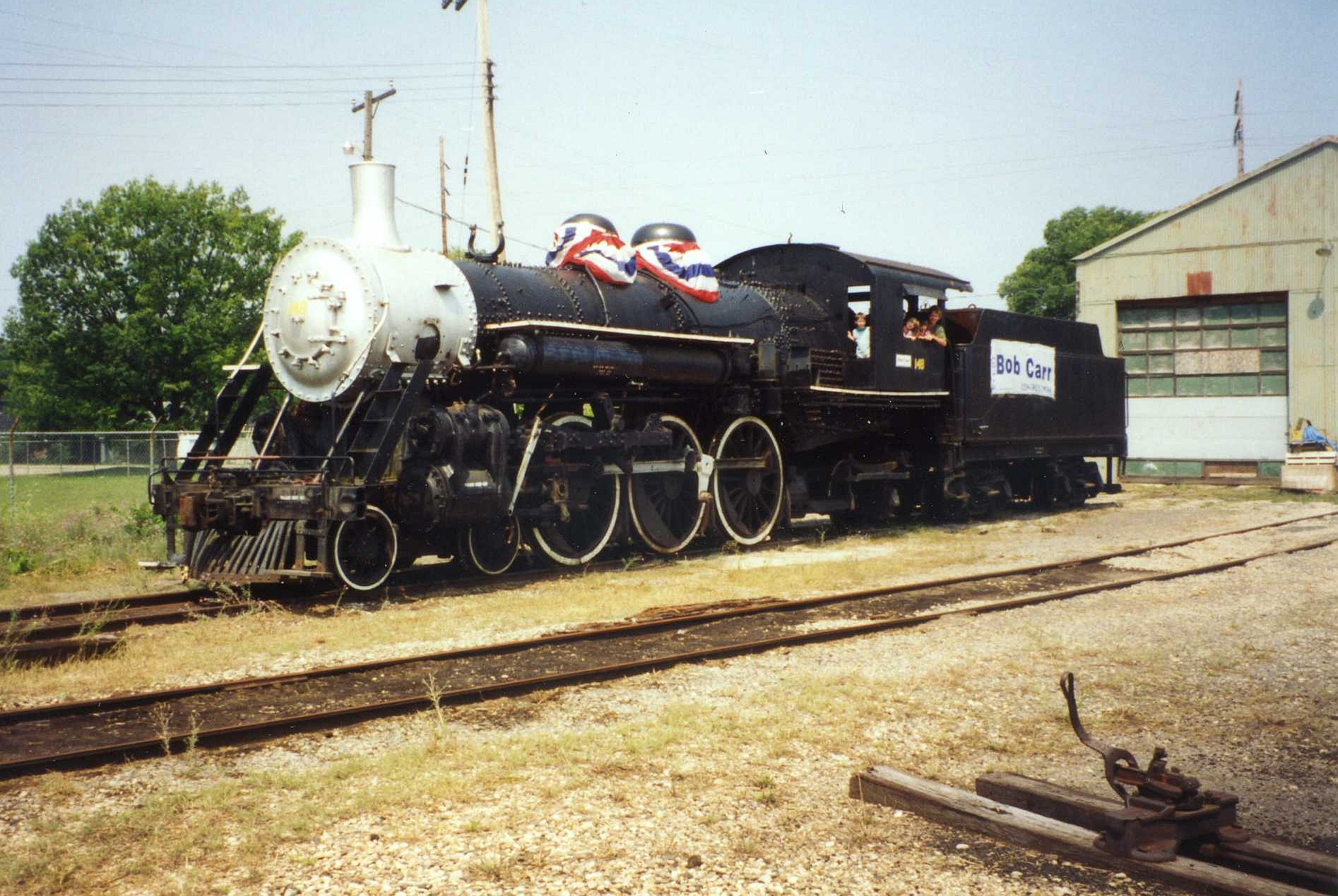
No. 148 in storage at Traverse City, Michigan, under ownership of Bob Carr during the 1990s.

In the 1960s, USSC began to retire most of their steam locomotives in favor of diesel power, including No. 148 who was the last one to be removed from the USSC roster. In September 1968, it was purchased by Sam Freeman, who restored it to operation in 1970 to use the locomotive in excursion service on the Black River and Western Railroad in Ringoes, New Jersey. In 1973, the No. 148 locomotive was sent to the New Hope and Ivyland Railroad workshop in New Hope, Pennsylvania, for repair work to its boiler and running gear. In 1974, it was moved to the Whippany-Toonerville Railroad, which ran along the Whippany River and 9 miles (14 kilometers) out of Whippany, New Jersey on the Morristown and Erie Railway (ME) line. The locomotive's tender was also lettered Whippany River to reflect its home base.

In September 1975, No. 148 took part in recreating the Jersey Central's (CNJ) Blue Comet train on former Erie rails between Ridgewood and Waldwick, New Jersey. On October 25, No. 148 was temporarily leased by the Main Line Steam Foundation, and it pulled a doubleheader excursion with Canadian Pacific 972 on the Lehigh Valley (LV) mainline from Bethlehem, Pennsylvania to South Plainfield, New Jersey and return. The foundation planned to retain both locomotives for a second doubleheader excursion on December 6 from Raritan to Bay Head via CNJ and New York and Long Branch (NY&LB) trackages, but No. 972 was sidelined from mechanical problems, so the consist had to be reduced, and No. 148 pulled the train solo. Tom Snyder, the host of The Tomorrow Show, was on board the excursion with camera crews, and No. 148 subsequently appeared in one of The Tomorrow Show segments.

When No. 148 became inoperable in 1977 and Freeman died in 1983, the locomotive was donated to the Valley Railroad (VALE) in Essex, Connecticut and was sold off to Bob Carr in Traverse City, Michigan five years later. In 1990, the Strasburg Rail Road (SRC) of Pennsylvania had considered acquiring No. 148 for use in pulling their tourist trains, but no negotiations were made. In 2000, No. 148 was sold to a Missouri-based firm, Zerr's Historic Steam Train, and they disassembled the locomotive for an overhaul, with the intention of using it to power tourist trains between Traverse City, Williamsburg, and Kingsley. In 2005, the disassembled No. 148 locomotive was sold again to the Denver and Rio Grande Historical Foundation in Monte Vista, Colorado, who originally planned to continue the locomotive's restoration and operate it for tourist operations on the former Denver and Rio Grande Western branch line between South Fork and Creede, Colorado, but never succeeded it due to the 2008 financial crisis.

=== Current excursion service with U.S. Sugar ===
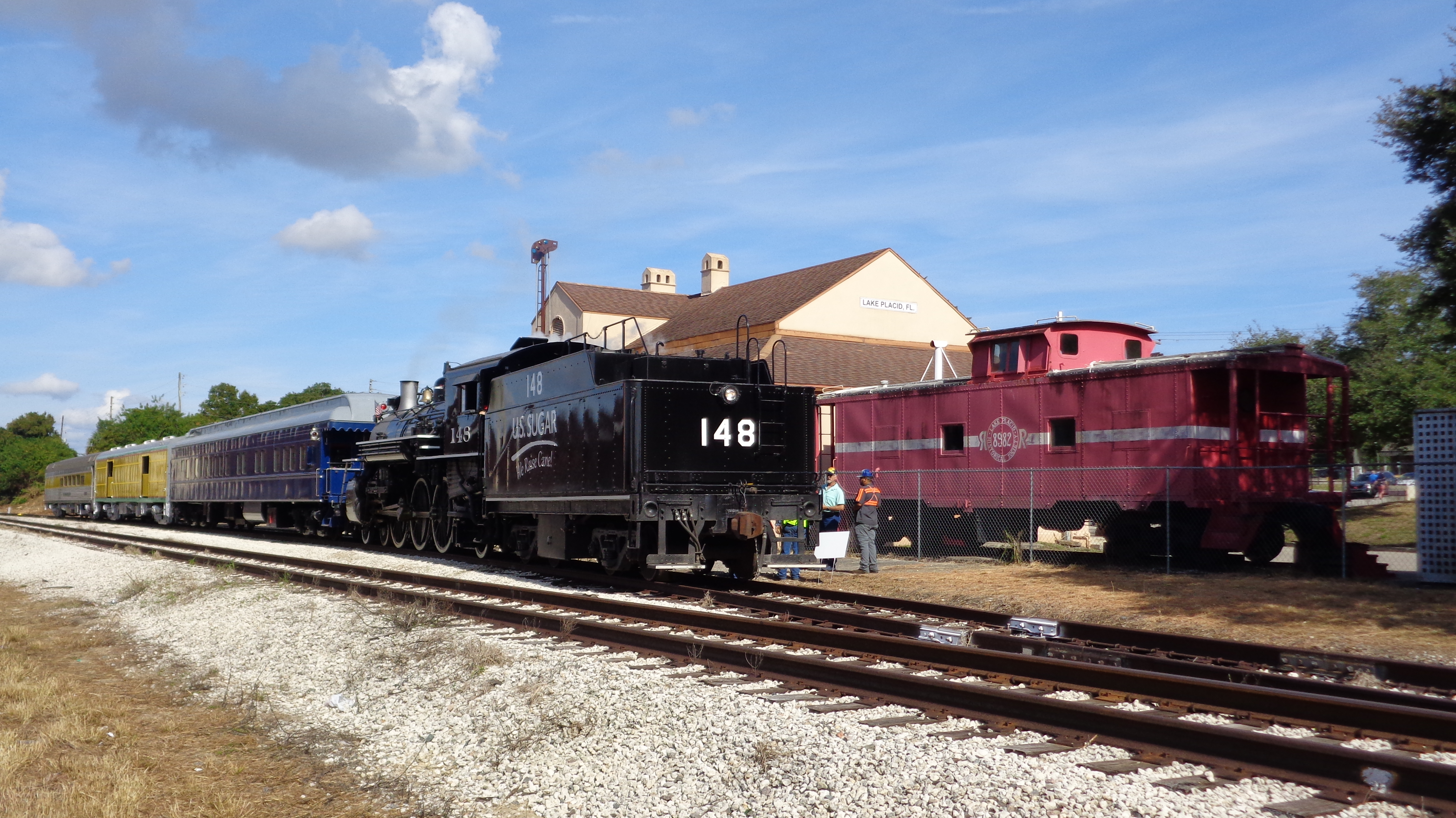
No. 148 at the former Atlantic Coast Line Lake Placid Depot with the inaugural Lake Placid Limited excursion in December 2021.

In late 2016, USSC CEO Robert H. Buker Jr. reacquired the No. 148 locomotive and restored it to operating condition for use in excursion service on the South Central Florida Express (SCFX) main line. During the restoration work, which started in early 2017, No. 148 received a lot of fabrication work to its wheelset, crankpins, and bearing boxes. Additionally, it was given a new front boiler course and smokebox, which were both completely welded. No. 148's cab was equipped with a radio speaker system to allow the engineer and fireman communicating the train dispatcher. The locomotive's firebox was also modified to burn recycled vegetable oil instead of bunker C oil.

In April 2020, after an extensive restoration work with assistance from FMW Solutions, Steam Operations Corporation, and Continental Fabricators Inc, No. 148 moved under its own power for the first time in 43 years. It began its first revenue service on that same year of May 28, pulling the last sugarcane train of USSC's 2019–2020 harvest season. On October 1, 2020, No. 148 kickstarted USSC's 90th harvest season and was christened with a bottle of champagne by Buker's wife Barbara. On December 12, 2020, U.S. Sugar went into partnership with the U.S. Marines and Toys for Tots organization, using No. 148 to haul the annual Santa Express train loaded with toys donated to children in Moore Haven, Clewiston, Belle Glade, and Port Mayaca. A year later, No. 148 ran its first Sugar Express public excursion train, the Lake Placid Limited from Clewiston to Lake Placid, Florida and back.

On January 29–30, 2022, USSC and Trains Magazine hosted a private photo charter of the No. 148 locomotive pulling passenger and freight consists. On that same year of April 9–10, No. 148 pulled its second excursion train, the Moore Haven Meteor from Clewiston to Moore Haven and back. On April 23–25, 2022, No. 148 hauled a consist of eight different private passenger cars for the American Association of Private Railroad Car Owners' (AAPRCO) special Sugarland Limited train on a multi-day tour around the Lake Okeechobee counties. From late 2022 to mid 2023, No. 148 continued to pull more of USSC's scheduled Sugar Express excursions, including sponsorship from the Florida East Coast Railway Society. These were the last contributions of USSC CEO Buker before he retired on October 27, 2023. The operation's current excursions include the Lake Placid Limited between Clewiston and Lake Placid, the Sunset & Suds trip on the Okeelanta branch, and the Santa Express out of Clewiston and Sebring.

On March 16, 2024, during the Clewiston Sugar Festival, No. 148 temporarily wore a six-chime whistle, which was on loan from the Gold Coast Railroad Museum in Miami, Florida, and was originally used on sister locomotive No. 153, which is also currently owned by the Gold Coast Railroad Museum. During the April 20–21 photo charter of that same year, No. 148 had its tender temporarily relettered with its original FEC letterings. On September 13, 2025, No. 148 participated in pulling a rare-mileage excursion between Clewiston and Fort Pierce, Florida, sponsored by the Florida East Coast Railway Society (FECRS). In 2026, No. 148 was backdated again to its 1950s-1960s USSC appearance for the January 17–18 photo charter.

== See also ==
- Atlantic Coast Line 1504
- Black River and Western 60
- Maine Central 470
- New York, Susquehanna and Western 142
- Norfolk and Western 578
- Savannah and Atlanta 750
- Southern Pacific 2472

== Bibliography ==
- Bramson, Seth H. (2003). Speedway to Sunshine: The Story of the Florida East Coast Railway (2nd ed.). Boston Mills Press. ISBN 1-55046-358-6.
- Drury, George (2015). Guide to North American Steam Locomotives, Revised Edition (2nd ed.). Kalmbach Media. ISBN 978-1-62700-259-2.
- Jagger, Jerry J. (2016). Black River & Western Railroad. Images of Rails (1st ed.). Arcadia Publishing. ISBN 978-1-4671-2412-6.
- Wrinn, Jim (July 2022). "Why we love the 4-6-2". Trains. Vol. 82, no. 7. Kalmbach Media. pp. 32–39.
- Ziel, Ron (1990). Mainline Steam Revival (1st ed.). Amereon House. ISBN 0-8488-0863-0.
