= Wood lagging =

Method of protecting pipelines with wood

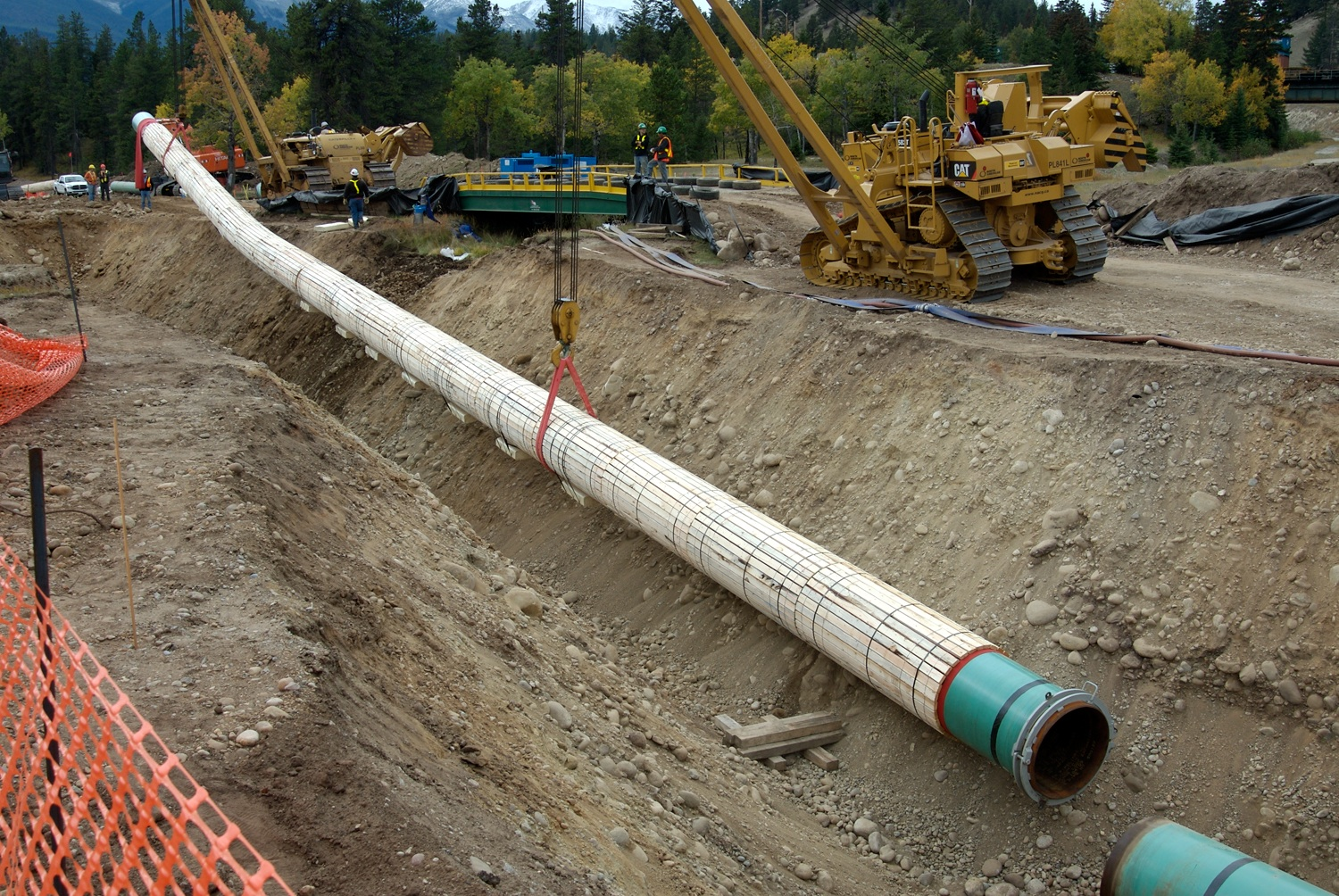
A pipeline protected by wood lagging.

Wood lagging is a method of banding wooden slats around pipelines to protect against impact, abrasion, and corrosion. Wooden lagging acts as a sheath, protecting the pipeline from damage, and is especially useful in rocky terrain; steep inclines; around rivers or swampy areas; and other rough terrain. Boiler lagging is akin to pipe lagging, but is used to protect steam boilers.

Wood lagging has been used on notable pipelines such as The Trans-Mountain Pipeline, which spans the Canadian Rockies, since 1953, and The Kinder Morgan TMX Anchor Loop. The latter, constructed in 2007, used wood lagging in the environmentally-sensitive terrain and river crossings of Alberta's Jasper National Park.

== Overview ==
=== Construction process ===
Wood lagging is one of several solutions employed by pipeline engineers to provide mechanical protection for underground pipelines. Others include concrete coating, rockshield, high-density polyethylene, imported sand padding, and padding machines.

Wood lagging involves wiring a series of wooden slats together to create a 'blanket'. This blanket of wooden slats is then dropped over and wrapped around the outside of a pipeline, with or without coating, and secured with steel or plastic banding.

Once wood lagging is installed, the pipeline can be buried and backfilled. (Wood lagging is installed as part of the “padding and backfill” stage of construction.)

For pipelines that encounter saturated soils or water, wood lagging is often installed in between bolt-on concrete weights, acting as a spacer to keep the weights in place as well as to provide mechanical protection to the pipe. River weights are generally used at river and creek crossings to counteract the buoyancy of pipelines in stream, high water table situations, or in swampy areas.

=== Characteristics ===
Wood lagging is especially useful to protect pipelines in rocky terrain; steep inclines; around rivers or swampy areas; and in areas with poor natural availability of padding, such as sand or gravel.

Wood lagging is light, flexible, and easy to install at construction sites. As a method for protecting pipelines, wood lagging offers high-impact resistance at a considerably reduced cost compared to other types of pipeline protection, such as concrete coating.

Materials for wood lagging can often be sourced regionally near pipeline construction sites, reducing transportation time and costs. Wood used in wood lagging is a renewable resource that creates a carbon sequestration effect after pipeline burial, providing minimal environmental impact compared to other types of pipeline protection.

=== Historic and modern uses ===
The longevity of wood lagging that has been installed underground is unknown. However, intact wood lagging has been found still performing its function more than 50 years after installation:

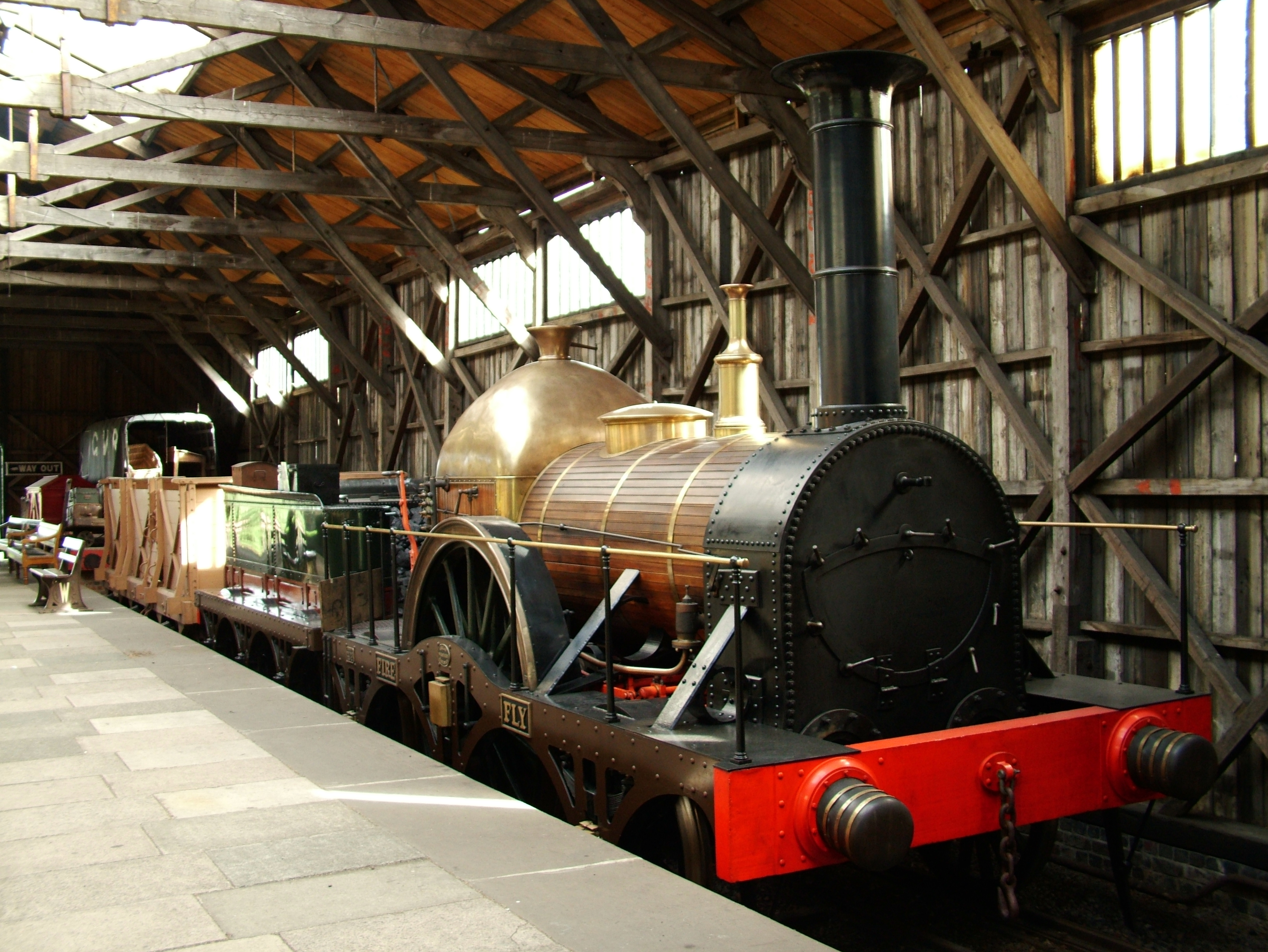
GWR Firefly replica at Didcot Railway Centre. The wooden slats around boiler are an example of boiler lagging

- The Trans-Mountain Pipeline, which spans the Canadian Rockies, the mountainous region of central British Columbia, and 98 streams and rivers, used wood lagging to protect an expanse of pipe crossing the Coquihalla Canyon. Archival film footage shows the use of wood lagging during its installation in 1953.

Modern examples of wood lagging used to protect oil and natural gas pipelines include:

- The BC Gas Southern Crossing Pipeline, constructed in 2000. Wood lagging was used in approximately 22 km of the 315 km pipeline route.
- The Kinder Morgan TMX Anchor Loop, constructed in 2007 by Kinder Morgan Energy Partners. Wood lagging was used to protect the pipeline in the environmentally-sensitive terrain and river crossings in Jasper National Park in Alberta. In this case, two-by-four inch slats were strapped over the pipes to provide extra protection against the rough terrain of the Rocky Mountains.
- Sun Canadian's company policy is to cover exposed pipes with wood lagging.

A different, but related, use of wooden slats was for lagging steam boilers, for example in trains.

== See also ==
- Pipeline transport
- Pipe (fluid conveyance)
- Hollow structural section
