= U.S. Sugar =

Agricultural business based in Florida

U.S. Sugar Corporation
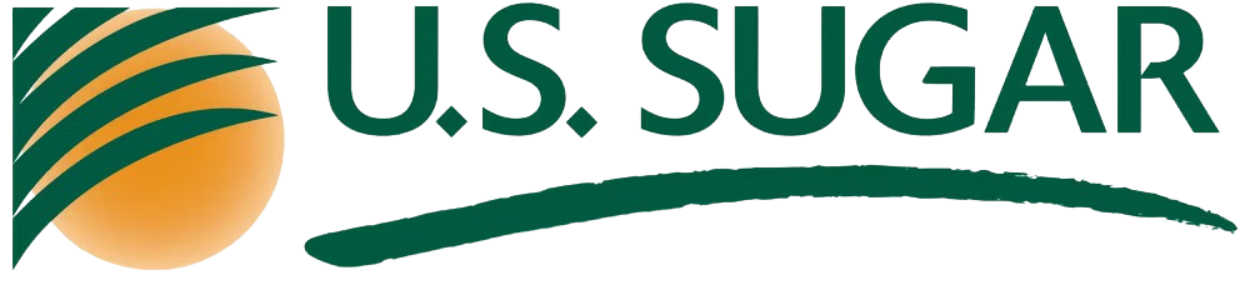

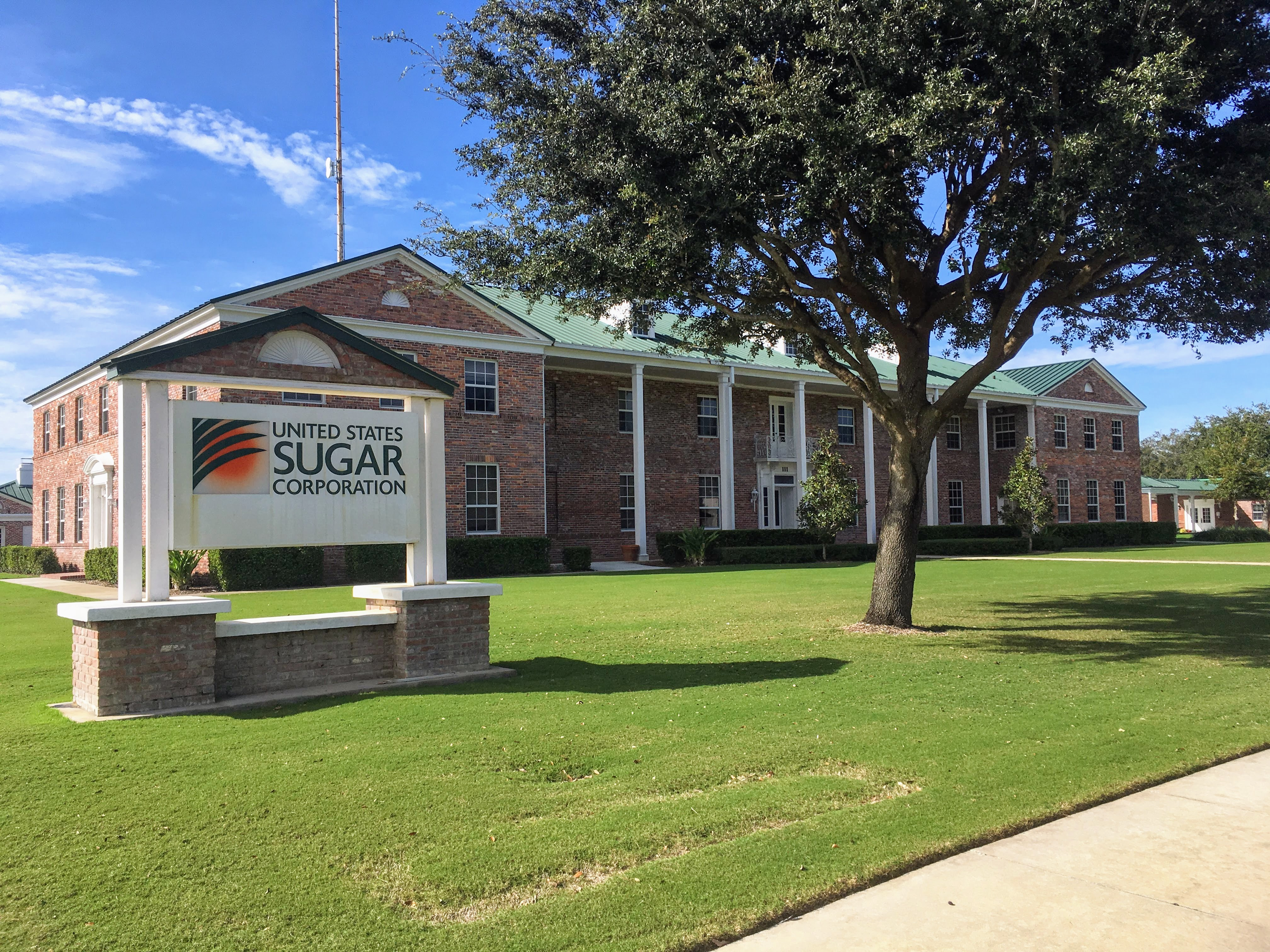
- Headquarters of U.S. Sugar in Clewiston, Florida
- Company type: Private
- Industry: Agricultural
- Predecessor: Southern Sugar Corporation
- Founded: 1931; 95 years ago
- Founder: Charles Stewart Mott
- Headquarters: Clewiston, Florida
- Key people: William S. White (chairman); Ken McDuffie (CEO)
- Products: refined sugar; sweet corn; oranges
- Owners: Company's pension fund and employees (40% estimate); Mott Children's Health Center (22%); Charles Stewart Mott Foundation (19%); Community Foundation of Greater Flint (6%)
- Subsidiaries: Southern Gardens Citrus
- Website: www.ussugar.com

U.S. Sugar Corporation is a privately owned agricultural business based in Clewiston, Florida. The company farms over 230,000 acres of land in the counties of Hendry, Glades, Martin, and Palm Beach. It is the largest producer of sugarcane in the United States by volume, producing over 700,000 tonnes per year. The company is also a large producer of refined sugar, sweet corn and oranges.

U.S. Sugar is considered in South Florida along with Florida Crystals and the 54-member Sugar Cane Growers Cooperative of Florida known as Big Sugar. The company is one of the largest employers in the Glades region of Florida, with more than 2,500 employees.

== History ==
In 1931, industrialist and philanthropist Charles Stewart Mott purchased assets near Clewiston, Florida from a 1920s bankrupt sugarcane company, Southern Sugar Company, to form the United States Sugar Corporation. In the 1940s, U.S. Sugar was charged with slavery violation.

Mott later transferred shares to his Charles Stewart Mott Foundation. When the Tax Reform Act of 1969 limited the shares that private family foundations could hold of a corporation, the foundation gave a large number of shares to the Mott Children's Health Center, a Flint, Michigan, charitable medical organization founded in 1939, to be below the 35% limit.

In 1962, the company opened the Bryant Sugar House, which at the time was the largest and most advanced sugarcane processing mill in the world. The mill had a capacity of 5,000 tons of sugarcane per day.

After C.S. Mott died in 1973, C.S. Harding Mott, his son, took over as chairman of the corporation. With sugar at 60 cents a pound in the 1970s and purchasers switching to corn syrup, the company expanded into other areas of farming including cattle, citrus and vegetables. In 1980, the U.S. acquired South Bay Growers. South Bay Growers produced 13% of the US's leafy vegetables growing lettuce, celery and others. In late 1985, U.S. Sugar began planting orange trees. In 1983, the company formed an Employee stock ownership plan (ESOP) in an attempt to go private. U.S. Sugar borrowed millions in long-term debt to create the ESOP. Some shareholders did not sell out believing the price per share to be too low triggering a class action lawsuit.

The ESOP and Mott group of owners in October 1987 offered $80 per share for the other 110,000 voting shares held by 500 public shareholders. This took the company private and reduced its reporting costs.

Most of South Bay Growers was closed down on September 4, 1994, after four out of five prior years of losses including 10 million in 1994. South Bay's salad processing plant with customers like McDonald's and Burger King and 146 employees would continue to operate while seeking new ownership.

Big sugar moved in the early 1990s to mechanical cane harvesters. The displaced cane field workers filed a class action lawsuit in which the company paid $5 million plus in 1998. In 2004, U.S. Sugar closed a mill and laid off workers. Its Bryant mill was closed in 2007.

In February 2008, the corporation, CEO Robert Buker, Chairman William S. White and his family and Charles Stewart Mott Foundation were sued by employees claiming that they were not getting full value for the ESOP stock given two bids for the company stock for amounts more than ESOP redemption were offered by outside parties. Employees alleged that the Gaylon Lawrence family agro-conglomerate offered $293 per share for the company twice, once in August 2005 and in January 2007. The Company stated that the offer (approximately $500 million) was well below market value—which was proved to be the case when the State of Florida publicly offered to buy US Sugar for $2 billion in 2008.

== Environment ==
On 24 June 2008, Florida's Governor, Charlie Crist, announced the state was in negotiations to buy 187,000 acres (760 km^{2}) of land and all of its manufacturing and production facilities for an estimated $1.7 billion from the company as part of the Comprehensive Everglades Restoration Plan. Under the proposals, the company would continue to farm the land for the next six years and convert the land back to its original natural marshland state. In November 2008, the agreement was revised to offer $1.34 billion, allowing sugar mills in Clewiston to remain in production. Critics of the revised plan say that it ensures sugarcane will be grown in the Everglades for at least another decade.

In October 2010 the company sold 26,800 acres of land to the South Florida Water Management District for the "River of Grass" Restoration Project.

== Economy ==
According to the Florida Sugarcane League, sugarcane farming has a $3.2 billion impact and supports more than 12,500 jobs. With more than 2,500 employees, U.S. Sugar is one of the "largest agribusiness employers in the Everglades region." However, sugarcane in the United States remains nearly twice as expensive per pound as in other developed countries due to the failure the industry would face without government subsidies.

== See also ==
- Agriculture in Florida
- South Central Florida Express the railway run by the company.
- Draining and development of the Everglades
- Everglades
- H-2 Worker
- Restoration of the Everglades
- Sugar cane mill
- U.S. Sugar 148 steam locomotive
