= Southern Railway 1380 =

Streamlined American 4-6-2 steam locomotive

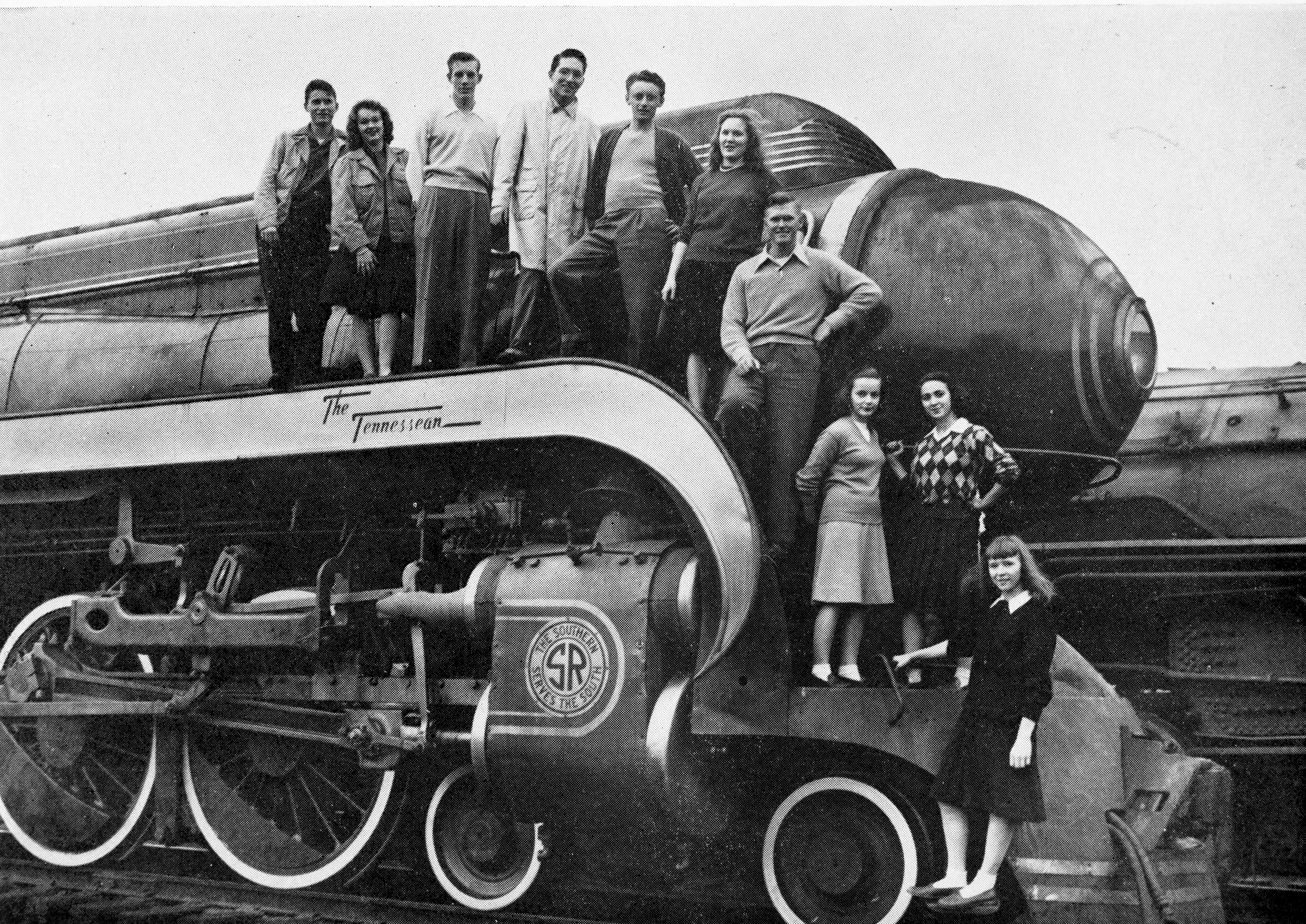
- No. 1380 in Spencer, North Carolina, with a group of high school students being posed behind it during 1948
Type and origin
- Power type: Steam
- Builder: American Locomotive Company (Schenectady Works)
- Serial number: 64857
- Build date: 1923
- Rebuild date: 1941
Specifications
- Configuration
  - Whyte: 4-6-2
  - UIC: 2′C1′ h
- Gauge: 4 ft 8 1/2 in (1,435 mm)
- Leading dia.: 33 in (838 mm)
- Driver dia.: 73 in (1,854 mm)
- Trailing dia.: 43 in (1,092 mm)
- Loco weight: 304,000 lb (138,000 kg)
- Tender weight: 261,600 lb (118,700 kg)
- Total weight: 565,600 lb (256,600 kg)
- Fuel type: Coal
- Fuel capacity: 16 tonnes (35,000 lb)
- Water cap.: 14,000 US gallons (53,000 L)
- Firebox
  - Grate area: 70 1/2 sq ft (6.55 m^{2})
- Boiler pressure: 200 psi (1.38 MPa)
- Feedwater heater: Worthington 3-B
- Cylinders: Two, outside
- Cylinder size: 27 in × 28 in (686 mm × 711 mm)
- Valve gear: Walschaerts, (originally Baker)
- Valve type: Piston valves
- Loco brake: Air
- Train brakes: Air
- Couplers: Knuckle
Performance figures
- Maximum speed: 60–80 mph (97–129 km/h)
- Power output: 2,624 hp (2,660 PS; 1,957 kW)
- Tractive effort: 47,535 lbf (211.45 kN)
- Factor of adh.: 3.79
Career
- Operators: Southern Railway
- Class: Ps-4
- Number in class: 6 of 64
- Locale: Southeastern United States
- Retired: April 7, 1952
- Disposition: Scrapped

Southern Railway 1380 was a streamlined 4-6-2 "Pacific" type steam locomotive built in 1923 by American Locomotive Company (ALCO) of Schenectady, New York, for the Southern Railway (SOU) as a member of the Ps-4 class, which was based on the United States Railroad Administration (USRA) Heavy Pacific design with some minor differences. Redesigned in a Streamline Moderne style design by industrial designer Otto Kuhler in 1941, No. 1380 was the only streamlined steam locomotive on the SOU. It hauled SOU's streamlined Tennessean passenger train between Washington, D.C., and Monroe, Virginia, until it was removed from the train in the late 1940s. Retaining its streamlined design, the locomotive was retired from revenue service in 1952 and scrapped a year later.

== History ==
=== Background ===
No. 1380 was one of the first batch of 12 Ps-4 locomotives, Nos. 1375-1386, built by American Locomotive Company (ALCO) of Schenectady, New York in 1923. They were originally painted black with gold linings and lettering. The Ps-4s were based on the United States Railroad Administration (USRA) Heavy Pacific design, differing the smaller 73 in (1,854 mm) driving wheels, a slightly shorter boiler, an additional firebox combustion chamber, and a Worthington 3-B type feedwater heater. They produced 47,535 lbf (211.45 kN) of tractive effort, allowing them to pull 14 passenger cars at 80 mph (129 km/h).

The Ps-4s would serve as the primary mainline passenger locomotives on the SOU's Washington D.C. to Atlanta mainline, pulling their top-priority passenger trains, including the Crescent. In 1925, SOU president Fairfax Harrison had all of the Ps-4s, including No. 1380, repainted in a new Virginian green and gold paint scheme after his visit in the United Kingdom where he admired the country's London and North Eastern Railway's (LNER) apple-green passenger locomotives. In the early 1930s, the Virginian green on all of the Ps-4s and other passenger locomotive classes was replaced with a lighter shade of green, which was known as Sylvan green. Around 1934, the gold leaf paint for the lining and lettering was replaced with Dulux imitation gold paint since the former were not visible enough to be seen in black and white photographs. Also in the mid-late 1930s, the Ps-4s, including No. 1380, had their original Baker valve gear replaced with Walschaerts type due to the former risking to reverse itself at high-speed, damaging the locomotives' wheels and the rails.

=== Streamlining for the Tennessean ===
On May 17, 1941, SOU introduced their brand-new public streamlined Tennessean passenger train, which replaced the Memphis Special that ran between Washington, D.C. and Memphis, Tennessee. It was frequently hauled behind SOU's new EMD E6 diesel locomotives, but the Tennessean ran via Norfolk and Western (N&W) rails between Monroe, Virginia and Bristol, Tennessee, and N&W would not allow diesel locomotives running on their rails. The SOU, not wanting to get all tied up with their expensive E6s doing a short run between Washington D.C. and Monroe, decided to streamline one of their Ps-4 locomotives to pull the Tennessean consist. The result was No. 1380, which was scheduled for repairs at SOU's Spencer Shops in Spencer, North Carolina, and was given a streamlined design created by industrial designer Otto Kuhler. Despite Kuhler being impressed with his design on No. 1380, SOU did not pay him at all.

No. 1380 was painted Sylvan green with a silver stripe, the "SR" symbol logo plastered on both sides of its the cylinders, and the Tennessean logo painted on both sides of its streamlined panels. Additionally, it was given a larger tender, which holds 14,000 US gallons (53,000 L) of water and was originally from fellow Ps-4 locomotive No. 1400, who now received No. 1380's original smaller 10,000 US gallons (38,000 L) tender. No. 1400's original tender was also given a streamlined design to match No. 1380's look. No. 1380's original alligator crossheads were also replaced with a single multiple-bearing type.

The locomotive worked on the Washington Division, where it frequently pulled the Tennessean from Washington, D.C. to Monroe in exchange for the N&W steam locomotives taking the train down to Bristol, where the SOU diesels would complete the Tennessean's journey to Memphis. Aside from running the Tennessean, No. 1380 also assigned to other trains such as locals, expresses, and troop trains throughout World War II. The Tennessean's journey between Washington, D.C. and Monroe was also pulled by other Ps-4 locomotives.

=== Twilight years ===
However, when World War II ended in 1945, the Washington Division was completely dieselized with No. 1380 being retired from the Tennessean and relegated to haul the Washington, D.C.-Atlanta local passenger trains and mail trains. Additionally, No. 1380 was on motive power pool service, where it was used to protect passenger schedules in case of a diesel locomotive was unavailable to pull SOU's top-priority passenger trains such as the Birmingham Special, the Peach Queen, and the Piedmont Limited. Despite being removed from the Tennessean, No. 1380 retained its streamlined design. In the spring of 1951, it was polished up and put on display at the Spencer Shops in June 24 that year to commemorate the end of steam on the SOU.

No. 1380 was finally retired from revenue service on April 7, 1952, after pulling a local passenger train from Monroe, Virginia to Salisbury, North Carolina. It was stored out of service at the Spencer Shops until July 29, 1953, when it was finally written off of SOU's motive power roster. (Note: The locomotive was deemed in good condition, serviceable for at least another 15 months and flue time lasted until June 1956.) No. 1380's tender was likely scrapped at Spencer and the locomotive was paired with a smaller tender, which came from Ks class 2-8-0 "Consolidation" type No. 856. No. 1380 was also one of the 19 steam locomotives being towed for scrap to the Baltimore Steel Company in Baltimore, Maryland, on the August 5 train by a four-unit set of SOU's new EMD F7s, with No. 4246 leading the way.

== See also ==
- Atlanta and West Point 290
- Atlantic Coast Line 1504
- Norfolk and Western 611
- Southern Railway 1401

== Bibliography ==
- Bryant Jr., H. Stafford (October 1950). "Ps-4". Trains. Vol. 10, no. 12. Kalmbach Publishing. pp. 20–26.
- Bryant Jr., H. Stafford (1962). The Georgian Locomotive (1st ed.). Weathervane. OCLC 3004841.
- Drury, George (2015). Guide to North American Steam Locomotives, Revised Edition (2nd ed.). Kalmbach Publishing. ISBN 978-1-62700-259-2.
- Murray, Tom (2007). Southern Railway (1st ed.). Voyager Press. ISBN 978-0-7603-2545-2.
- Prince, Richard E. (1970). Steam Locomotives and Boats: Southern Railway System (2nd ed.). Wheelwright Lithographing Company. ISBN 0-9600088-4-5.
- Ranks, Harold; Lowe, Shelby (1966). Southern Steam Power (1st ed.). Barnhart Press.
- Tillotson Jr., Curt (2004). Southern Railway Steam Trains Volume 1 – Passenger (1st ed.). TLC Publishing. ISBN 1-883089-94-8.
