= Southern Railway 1401 =

Preserved American 4-6-2 locomotive (SOU Ps-4 class)

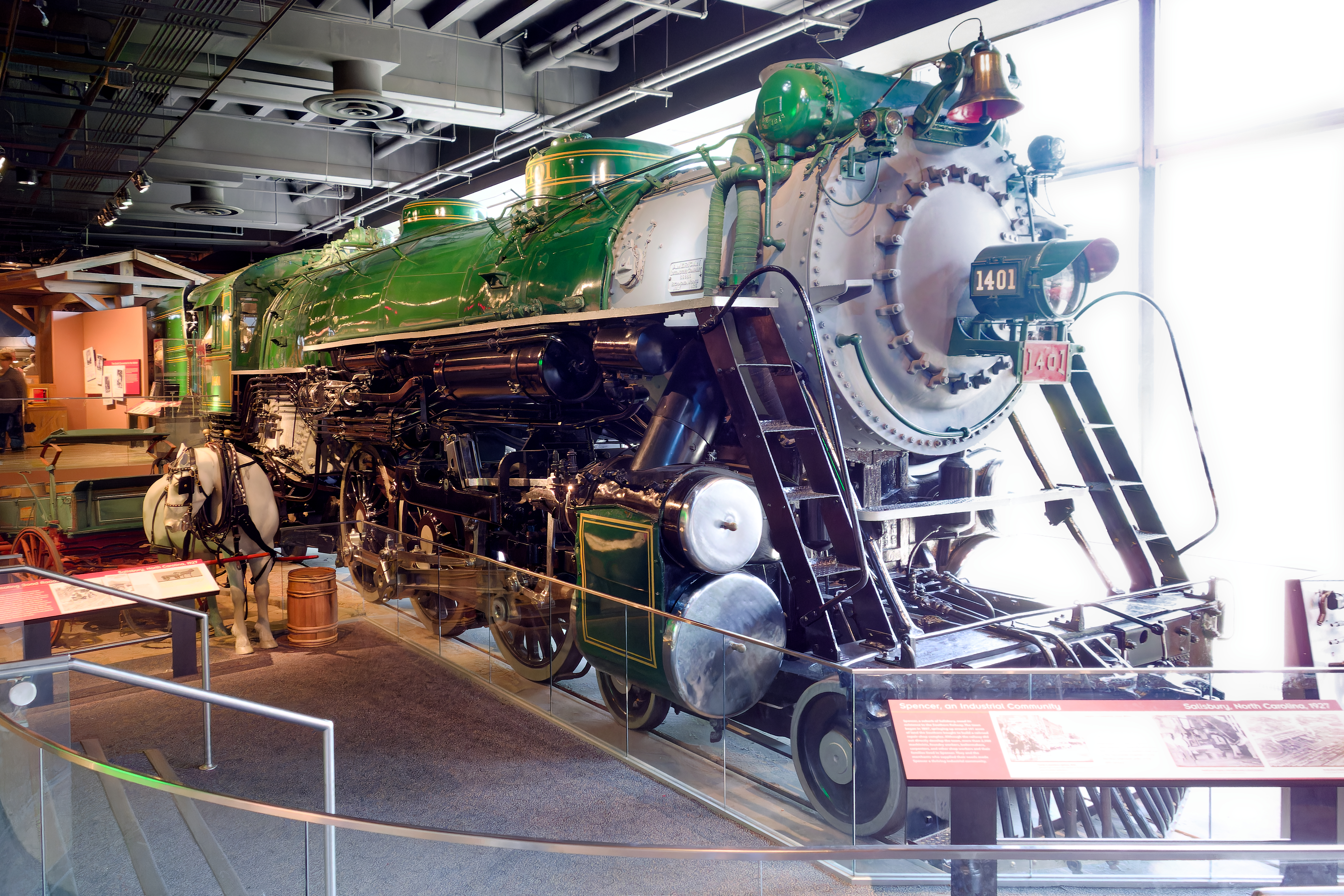
- Southern Railway No. 1401 on static display at the National Museum of American History in 2013.
Type and origin
- Power type: Steam
- Builder: American Locomotive Company (Richmond Works)
- Serial number: 66888
- Build date: July 1926
Specifications
- Configuration
  - Whyte: 4-6-2
  - UIC: 2′C1′ h
- Gauge: 4 ft 8 1/2 in (1,435 mm)
- Leading dia.: 33 in (838 mm)
- Driver dia.: 73 in (1,854 mm)
- Trailing dia.: 43 in (1,092 mm)
- Loco weight: 304,000 lb (138,000 kg)
- Tender weight: 261,600 lb (118,700 kg)
- Total weight: 565,600 lb (256,600 kg)
- Fuel type: Coal
- Fuel capacity: 16 tonnes (35,000 lb)
- Water cap.: 14,000 US gallons (53,000 L)
- Firebox
  - Grate area: 70 1/2 sq ft (6.55 m^{2})
- Boiler pressure: 200 psi (1.38 MPa)
- Feedwater heater: Elesco
- Cylinders: Two, outside
- Cylinder size: 27 in × 28 in (686 mm × 711 mm)
- Valve gear: Walschaerts, (originally Baker)
- Valve type: Piston valves
- Loco brake: Air
- Train brakes: Air
- Couplers: Knuckle
Performance figures
- Maximum speed: 60–80 mph (97–129 km/h)
- Power output: 2,624 hp (2,660 PS; 1,957 kW)
- Tractive effort: 47,535 lbf (211.45 kN)
- Factor of adh.: 3.79
Career
- Operators: Southern Railway
- Class: Ps-4
- Number in class: 46 of 64
- Numbers: SOU 1401
- Nicknames: The Harrison Engine
- Locale: Southeastern United States
- Retired: January 1952
- Preserved: February 10, 1953
- Restored: November 1961 (cosmetically)
- Current owner: Smithsonian Institution
- Disposition: On static display

Southern Railway 1401 is a 4-6-2 "Pacific" type steam locomotive built in July 1926 by American Locomotive Company (ALCO) of Richmond, Virginia, for the Southern Railway (SOU) as a member of the Ps-4 class, which was based on the United States Railroad Administration (USRA) Heavy Pacific design with some minor differences. It was also among the last passenger steam locomotives built at ALCO's Richmond Works before its closure in 1927.

No. 1401 was initially based in Atlanta to pull SOU's premier mainline passenger trains between Atlanta, Georgia and Salisbury, North Carolina, where it was swapped out with the Spencer-based Ps-4s doing the passenger trains' runs between there and Washington, D.C. Painted in a green and gold paint scheme, No. 1401 and the other Ps-4s were signified as the First Ladies of the Pacifics. When the diesels took over pulling the premier Washington, D.C. to Atlanta passenger trains in 1941, No. 1401 and the Ps-4s were relegated to pull local mainline passenger trains and mail trains.

During 1945, No. 1401 hauled the funeral train of U.S. President Franklin D. Roosevelt from Greenville, South Carolina to Salisbury. At that time, it was relocated to Spencer, where it got the chance to run between Salisbury and Washington, D.C. Retired from revenue service by the SOU in early 1952, No. 1401 was donated to the Smithsonian Institution in 1962, where it remains on permanent static display at the National Museum of American History in Washington, D.C. as the sole survivor of the Southern Railway Ps-4 class.

== History ==
=== Design and appearances ===
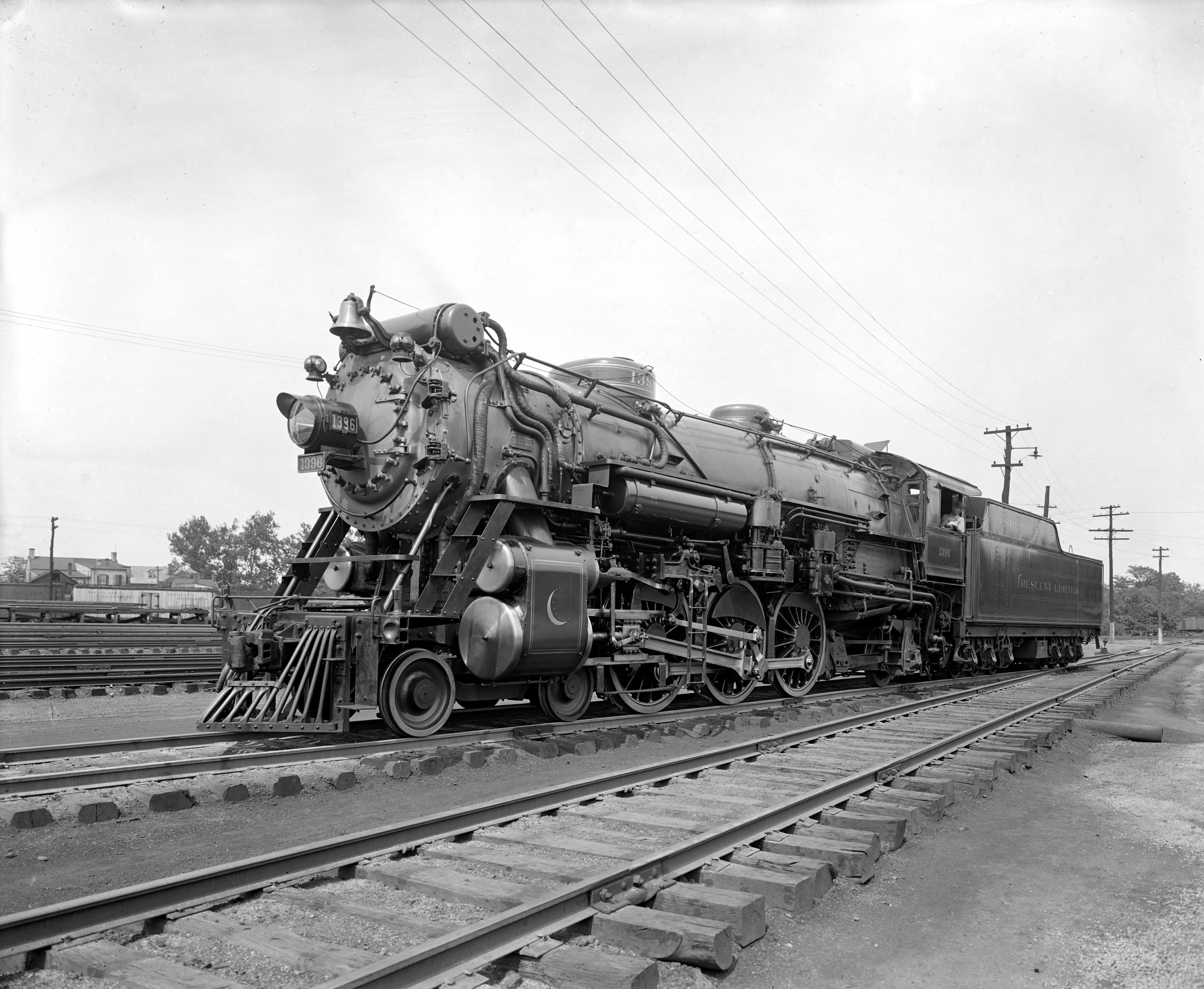
Sister locomotive No. 1396 at Alexandria, Virginia, in 1927.

During the 1920s, the Southern Railway's (SOU) smaller Ps-2 class 4-6-2 Light Pacifics have reach their limit and could not handle the longer and heavier mainline passenger trains between Washington, D.C., and Atlanta, Georgia. (Note: Although there were Ts and Ts-1 class 4-8-2 locomotives valid enough to handle this work, they could not be relocated to some of SOU's routes all over again.) Therefore, the SOU ordered the more powerful 4-6-2 Heavy Pacific Ps-4 class with a total of 27 locomotives, Nos. 1366–1392, built between 1923 and 1924 by the American Locomotive Company (ALCO) of Schenectady, New York, and were originally painted black with gold leaf lining and lettering. (Note: The five locomotives (Nos. 6471–6475) were built for the Cincinnati, New Orleans and Texas Pacific Railway (CNO&TP), while the other four locomotives (Nos. 6684–6687) were assigned to the Alabama Great Southern Railroad (AGS).) These locomotives were equipped with a two-axle bogie tender with a fuel capacity of 16 tonnes (35,000 lb) of coal and 10,000 US gallons (38,000 L) of water. The Ps-4s were based on the United States Railroad Administration (USRA) Heavy Pacific design, differing in that they lacked the smaller 73 in (1.854 m) driving wheels, and included a slightly shorter boiler, and a Worthington 3-B type feedwater heater. These arrangements made the Ps-4s produce 47,535 lbf (211.45 kN) of tractive effort, which allowed them to pull 14 passenger cars at 80 mph (129 km/h) on SOU's Piedmont terrain.

During 1925, SOU president Fairfax Harrison traveled to the United Kingdom where he admired the country's London and North Eastern Railway's (LNER) apple-green passenger locomotives, which inspired him to repaint the Ps-4s and the other SOU passenger class locomotives in a new Virginia (forest) green and gold leaf paint scheme. This included the second batches of twelve locomotives, Nos. 1393–1404, built in the summer of 1926 by ALCO's Richmond Works in Richmond, Virginia, at a cost of US$56,419 each (equivalent to $798,135 in 2024). (Note: Seven additional locomotives (Nos. 6476–6482) were built for the CNO&TP, while the other four locomotives (Nos. 6688–6691) were assigned to the AGS.) Additionally, they were equipped with an Elesco feedwater heater as opposed to the Worthington type. The 1926 locomotives were equipped with a larger three-axle bogie tender with a water capacity of 14,000 US gallons (53,000 L) designed for long-distance passenger runs and eliminating multiple water stops, excluding Monroe, Virginia and Greenville, South Carolina. Because of the Ps-4s' green and gold paint scheme, they were signified as the First Ladies of the Pacifics by Trains Magazine writer H.S. Bryant Jr. Additionally, these locomotives were affectionally nicknamed the Harrison Engines. They were among the last passenger steam locomotives built at ALCO's Richmond Works before its closure in 1927.

In 1928, the last batch of five Ps-4s, Nos. 1405–1409, were built by the Baldwin Locomotive Works (BLW) in Philadelphia, Pennsylvania, at a cost of $57,000 each (equivalent to $825,908 in 2024). They were equipped with a smaller two-axle bogie tender with a capacity of 12,000-gallon of water. No. 1409 was experimentally equipped with a Coffin feedwater heater, which was later removed and replaced with the Worthington SA type in the 1940s. While the 1923–1926 batches were equipped with Baker valve gear, the 1928 locomotives were built with Walschaerts valve gears. They were also the last passenger steam locomotives that SOU have ever ordered.

In the early 1930s, the Virginia green on all of the Ps-4s and other passenger locomotive classes was replaced with a lighter shade of green, which was known as Sylvan green. Around 1934, the gold leaf paint for the linings and letterings were replaced with Dulux imitation gold paint since the former did not show up well in black and white photographs. The Ps-4s still retained the Sylvan green with Dulux gold trimming and lettering until the end of steam. Also around the mid-late 1930s, Nos. 1366–1404 were re-equipped with Walschaerts valve gears due to the Baker type risking to reverse itself at high-speed and could easily damage the locomotive's wheels and the rails. The Ps-4s' original long, sharply pointed pilots were also replaced with shorter "boiler tube" style ones to accommodate each other to couple front to front. Most of them had their sand pipes concealed into the boiler cladding.

Around the 1940s, all of the Ps-4s were re-equipped with multiple-bearing crossheads to replace their original alligator type for greater bearing surface area. Additionally, Nos. 1366–1409, were all rebuilt with the raised front running board valve ladders to allow more room around their cylinders and running gear for faster maintenance on the mechanical lubricating system. Their tender coal bunkers were expanded to hold more coal. The Ps-4s were originally equipped with a standard Crosby 6 inch 3-chime whistle, which was replaced between 1938 and 1941 with a deeper sounding long-bell 3-chime "steamboat" whistle, manufactured by SOU's Lenoir Car Works in Lenoir City, Tennessee. (Note: Some of them were equipped with different types of whistles per the engineers' choices such as a Finley Shops three-chambered "town whistle" mounted right behind AGS No. 6691's stack. Nos. 1369 and 1407 were equipped with a single-tone air horn, mounted next to their smokebox.)

=== Revenue service ===
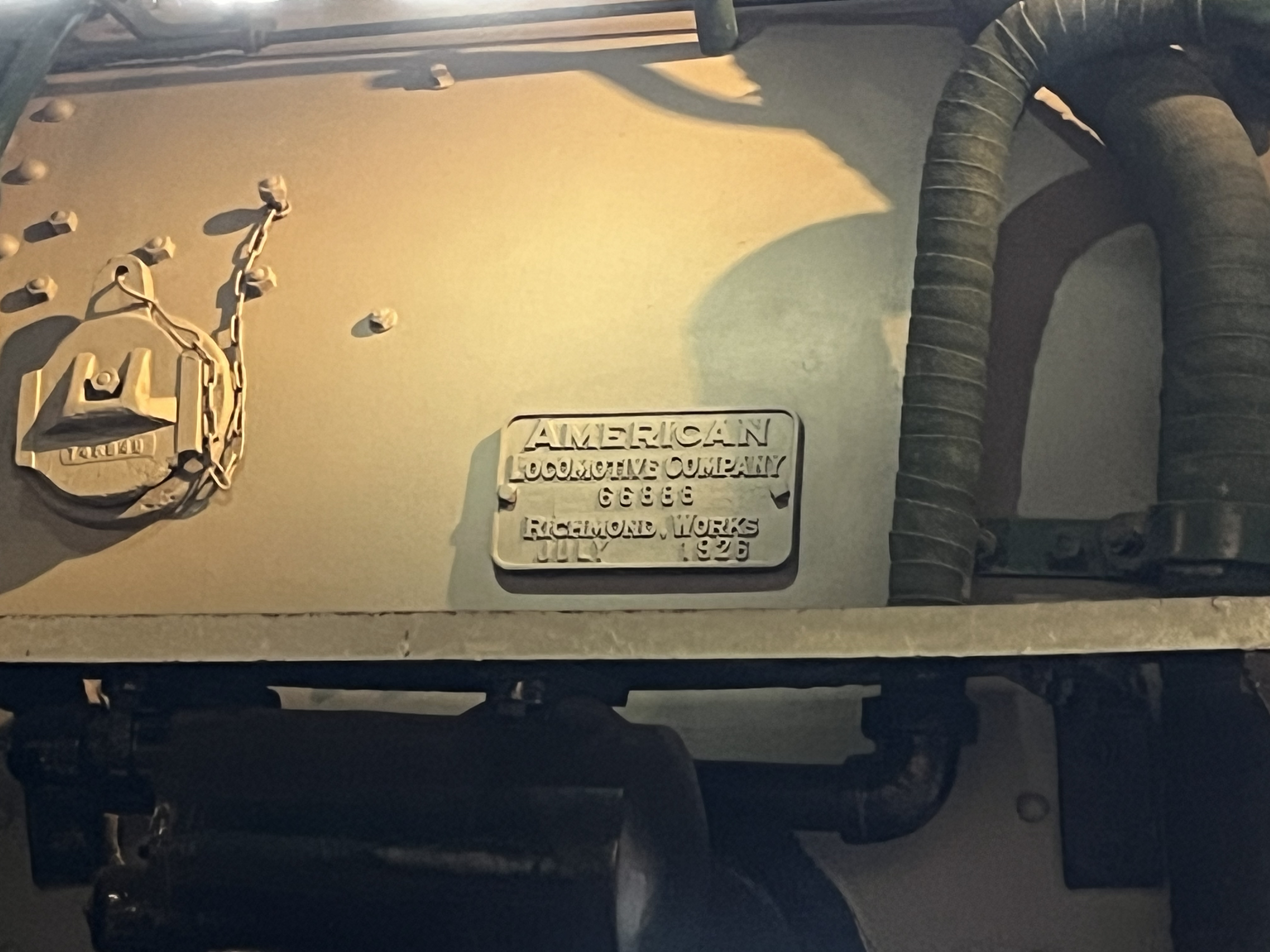
The builder's plate of Southern No. 1401.

No. 1401 was the forty-sixth member of the Ps-4 class and was one of the second batch built in 1926. It along with fellow Ps-4 locomotives Nos. 1393, 1394, 1402, and 1403 were initially based in Atlanta on SOU's Atlanta Division to run between there and Salisbury, North Carolina, pulling the railroad's premier mainline passenger trains such as the Crescent Limited, the New Yorker, the Peach Queen, the Piedmont Limited, and the Washington-Atlanta-New Orleans Express. Salisbury is the place where the Atlanta-based Ps-4s were swapped out with the Spencer-based Ps-4s, Nos. 1395-1400 and 1404, running to Washington, D.C. every 300 miles (480 km) or 150 miles (240 km) depending on the stops at Monroe and Greenville for refuel. (Note: The other Ps-4s pulled the Birmingham Special and Memphis Special passenger trains between Washington, D.C. and Monroe, Virginia, including the Aiken-Augusta Special between Washington, D.C. and Charlotte, North Carolina.) SOU's South (Pegram) Shops in Atlanta were responsible for maintaining the Ps-4s, including No. 1401, running between Atlanta and Salisbury.

The SOU allowed their engineers, firemen, and workshop employees to decorate the Ps-4s with two brass candlesticks flanked on their headlight, a brass spread eagle ornament mounted in front of their smokebox door above the headlight, and Masonic emblems to make them look more elegant and ornate. As such, during the 1930s, No. 1401 gained a Cincinnati, New Orleans and Texas Pacific (CNO&TP) "bowtie" style number plate, which was commonly used on SOU's subsidiary CNO&TP steam locomotives. (Note: This also include Ps-4s Nos. 6471–6482.) This also makes No. 1401 the only SOU principal region Ps-4 to adorn it.

Around 1941, SOU began to modernize their premier Washington, D.C. to Atlanta passenger trains with their new fleet of EMD E6 diesel locomotives to pull. No. 1401 and the other Ps-4s were relegated to haul the all-stops Washington D.C. to Atlanta local passenger and mail train Nos. 135 and 136, along with the Danville, Virginia to Greenville, South Carolina local passenger train Nos. 11 and 12. Additionally, the Ps-4s were in motive power pool service, where they were called in to pull SOU's mainline passenger trains again to protect the passenger schedules if one of the diesel locomotives was unavailable to operate. (Note: They also pulled stainless steel Budd streamlined passenger cars, which had re-equipped SOU's older passenger train consist such as the Crescent and debuted on newer passenger trains such as the Southerner.) On the night of April 25, 1942, No. 1401 was double heading with No. 1403, pulling the Atlanta Special passenger train from Atlanta to Washington, D.C., but struck a stalled truck at a railroad crossing in Norcross, Georgia, derailing both locomotives with the first four cars and injuring 12 or 13 people. They were both repaired and put back into service. (Note: In January 1952, No. 1403 was retired from revenue service and sold for scrap to the Baltimore Steel Company in Baltimore, Maryland, around October 1952.)

On April 13, 1945, No. 1401 became one of the eight Ps-4 locomotives to haul the funeral train of U.S. President Franklin Roosevelt. The funeral train, which consisted of 11 cars, was first hauled by Nos. 1409 and 1394, who brought it from Atlanta into Greenville, where No. 1401 and sister locomotive No. 1385 would take over. Serving as the lead locomotive for the run from Greenville to Salisbury, No. 1401 carried the American flag from the Greenville roundhouse, the only special marking carried on the funeral train. Upon arrival in Salisbury, the train was transferred over to Nos. 1367 and 1400 pulling it into Monroe, Virginia, where Nos. 1366 and 1406 would complete the funeral train's journey to Washington, D.C.

Also around 1945, No. 1401 was relocated to Spencer on the Charlotte Division with its maintenance site being switched over to SOU's Spencer Shops. Nos. 1393, 1394, 1402, and 1403 followed on in mid-1947 due to being displaced by SOU's newer batch of EMD F3 diesel units taking over their place in Atlanta and the Pegram Shops being converted into the principal maintenance and repair facility for diesels. This resulted in No. 1401 and the former Atlanta-based Ps-4s getting the chance to run between Salisbury and Washington, D.C. They would also pull the northern section Carolina Special to Durham, Raleigh, and Goldsboro, North Carolina; and sometimes the Aiken-Augusta Special to Columbia, South Carolina on the Columbia Division.

By November 1949, the Ps-4s' retirement began with No. 1399 being cut up for scrap at SOU's Hayne Shops in Spartanburg, South Carolina. No. 1401's last heavy repairs took place at the Spencer Shops on May 21, 1951. In January 1952, the No. 1401 locomotive was retired after it finished its last revenue run on SOU's Danville Division between Salisbury and Monroe. It had traveled nearly 2,000,000 miles (3,200,000 km) during its revenue service. The last Ps-4s made their last revenue run in May 1952.

=== Preservation and permanent display ===
"No doubt, you are aware that your famous Ps-4 class Pacific type locomotives have long been considered the handsomest locomotives of their type in the entire U.S., particularly in their brilliant green and gold trim with polished rods, offer a Ps-4 to the Smithsonian for permanent display."

— Walter H. Thrall's letter to Harry A. DeButts

On September 3, 1952, Whittier, California-based railfan Walter H. Thrall wrote a letter to SOU president Harry A. DeButts to salvage one of the Ps-4 locomotives and donate it to the Smithsonian Institution in Washington, D.C. (Note: Thrall was an engineer or fireman of the Union Pacific Railroad (UP), while his father was a former SOU employee.) DeButts passed on Thrall's idea to the chairman of the executive committee of Smithsonian's Board of Regents, Robert John Fleming, who agreed. In November 1952, No. 1401 was set aside for preservation and stored out of service with the other Ps-4s at the Spencer Shops. On February 10, 1953, the No. 1401 locomotive was chosen to be preserved at the Smithsonian and was towed to Alexandria, Virginia, to be stored at the Henry Street Yard to await the Smithsonian's decision. (Note: Before that, during December 1952, the SOU mechanical officers originally offered to donate the No. 1393 locomotive, but the Smithsonian declined and instead chose No. 1401 since the latter was recognized as one of the locomotives involved in the Roosevelt funeral train. In April 1953, No. 1393 was refurbished as a static display at the Spencer Shops for the Rowan County's bicentennial anniversary. Afterwards, it was offered to the Government of Atlanta for preservation display, but the mayor at the time, William B. Hartsfield, rejected the offer and was busy on expanding the Atlanta Municipal Airport. No. 1393 was eventually sold to the Baltimore Steel Company for scrap on July 29 of that same year. Ironically, in 1958, Hartsfield did accept a steam locomotive, Atlanta and West Point 4-6-2 No. 290, to be on display at Atlanta's Lakewood Park. He would later change his mind and had it removed in 1961.) During its time there, the locomotive sat outside the yard exposed to the elements. On June 28, 1955, the Smithsonian announced their finalized plan to build a new exhibition building called the Museum of History and Technology. In 1958, American historian John H. White Jr., who was hired as the Smithsonian's Museum Aide, made plans to have No. 1401 on display as part of the Museum of History and Technology's Railroad Hall exhibit. He then ordered to have locomotive being moved inside a warehouse for shelter near the Henry Street Yard, away from the outside elements.

In September 1961, No. 1401 was moved into the Shelton Paint Shop on Henry Street, where it was cosmetically restored with a new coat of paint. On October 30, the tender was finished first and the easiest to be transported via flatbed truck to the Smithsonian's under construction Museum of History and Technology building, where it arrived on November 13. The locomotive's repaint was finished on November 8 and it was towed to the Washington Navy Yard three days later. On November 25, the locomotive was lifted off the rails and onto a flatbed truck by two giant SOU wrecking cranes. On November 30, the No. 1401 locomotive finally arrived at the Museum of History and Technology building's Railroad Hall exhibit, where it was unloaded from the flatbed onto a temporary track and turntable, where it was slowly pulled around to align over the museum's tracks. The turntable was removed and the locomotive was finally lowered onto the rails inside the Railroad Hall exhibit, reuniting with its tender on December 6. No. 1401 was dedicated at the Smithsonian in June 1962 with SOU president D.W. Brosnan and Fleming in attendance.

When the Museum of History and Technology was opened to the public in early 1964, No. 1401 being largest item on display, was the star exhibit of the Railroad Hall and a Smithsonian icon. In early October 1966, No. 1401's whistle was temporarily used on Ms class 2-8-2 "Light Mikado" type No. 4501, which was pulling an excursion from Washington, D.C. to Front Royal, Virginia and back. In early 1967, No. 1401 was given a visor on its headlight and the Charlotte Division logo inscribed underneath both sides of its cab per advice of W. Graham Claytor Jr., who was SOU vice-president at the time. (Note: Before that, Claytor attempt to persuade SOU to lease a Ps-4 locomotive in operating condition for use in excursion service. But with No. 1401 being the sole survivor of its class and the Smithsonian refused, it was very unlikely.) In 1980, the Museum of History and Technology was renamed the National Museum of American History to reflect its scope of American history. On April 8, 2002, the Railroad Hall exhibit closed and No. 1401 had been pushed back at about 30 feet (360 in) from its former spot to be part of the new America On The Move exhibition, which opened on November 22, 2003. The No. 1401 locomotive still currently remains on permanent static display at the Smithsonian as the sole survivor of the Southern Railway Ps-4 class.

== See also ==
- Atlanta and West Point 290
- Atlantic Coast Line 1504
- London and North Eastern Railway 4472 Flying Scotsman
- Norfolk and Western 578
- Santa Cruz Railroad 3
- Southern Railway 722
- Southern Railway 1380

== Bibliography ==
- Bryant Jr., H. Stafford (October 1950). "Ps-4". Trains. Vol. 10, no. 12. Kalmbach Publishing. pp. 20–26.
- Davis, Burke (1985). The Southern Railway: Roads of the Innovators (1st ed.). The University of North Carolina Press. ISBN 0-8078-1636-1.
- Drury, George H. (2015). Guide to North American Steam Locomotives (2nd ed.). Kalmbach Media. ISBN 978-1-62700-259-2.
- Flanary, Ron (May 2007). "The Green Goddesses". Railfan & Railroad. Vol. 26, no. 5. Carstens Publications. pp. 46–53.
- Fitt, William C. (1973). Southern Ps-4 Class Pacific Locomotive Drawings (1st ed.). Wildwood Publications. ISBN 0-914104-00-4.
- Galloway, Duane; Wrinn, Jim (1996). Southern Railway's Spencer Shops: 1896-1996. TLC Publishing Inc. ISBN 1-883089-23-9.
- Klara, Robert (2010). FDR's Funeral Train: A Betrayed Widow, a Soviet Spy, and a Presidency in the Balance (1st ed.). St. Martin's Griffin. ISBN 978-0-230-10803-5.
- Loy, Sallie; Hillman, Dick; Cates, C. Pat (2005). The Southern Railway: Further Recollections. Images of Rail (1st ed.). Arcadia Publishing. ISBN 978-0-7385-1831-2.
- Morgan, David P. (1968). Locomotive 4501 (1st ed.). Kalmbach Publishing. ASIN B0006BW4DO.
- Morgan, David P. (December 1978). "A paean to the Ps-4". Trains. Vol. 39, no. 2. Kalmbach Publishing. pp. 28–34.
- Murray, Tom (2007). Southern Railway (1st ed.). Voyager Press. ISBN 978-0-7603-2545-2.
- Prince, Richard E. (1965). Steam Locomotives and Boats: Southern Railway System (1st ed.). Wheelwright Lithographing Company.
- Prince, Richard E. (1970). Steam Locomotives and Boats: Southern Railway System (2nd ed.). Wheelwright Lithographing Company. ISBN 0-9600088-4-5.
- Ranks, Harold; Lowe, Shelby (1966). Southern Steam Power (1st ed.). Barnhart Press.
- Roberts, Dale (March–April 1994). "Fairfax Harrison's Aristocrats: A Photo Study of the Most Elegant Group of Ps-4 Pacifics". TIES Magazine. Vol. 8, no. 2. Southern Railway Historical Association. pp. 4–17.
- Roberts, Dale; King, Ed (January 2008). "Ps-4ever". Trains. Vol. 68, no. 1. Kalmbach Publishing. pp. 60–67.
- Tillotson Jr., Curt (2000). Classic Steam Trains of the South (1st ed.). TLC Publishing. ISBN 1-883089-55-7.
- Tillotson Jr., Curt (2004). Southern Railway Steam Trains Volume 1 – Passenger (1st ed.). TLC Publishing. ISBN 1-883089-94-8.
- Withuhn, Bill (Winter 2009). "Our National Locomotive". Classic Trains. Vol. 10, no. 4. Kalmbach Publishing. pp. 37–39.
