= Southern Railway Ps-4 class =

Class of 64 American 4-6-2 locomotives

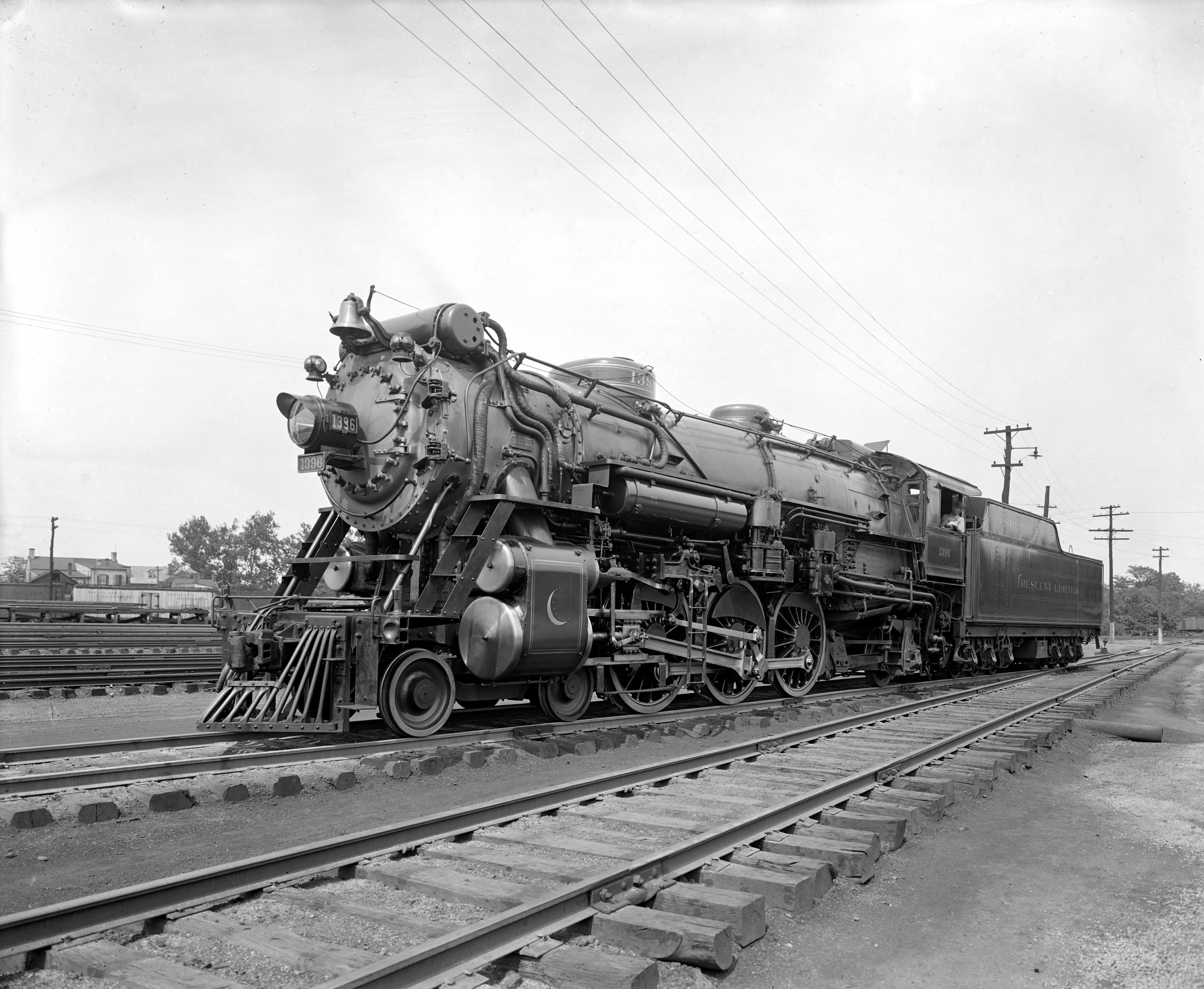
- ALCO Richmond built Ps-4 No. 1396 built in 1926.
Type and origin
- Power type: Steam
- Builder: ALCO Schenectady (1923 and 1924 batches); ALCO Richmond (1926 batch); Baldwin Locomotive Works (1928 batch)
- Build date: 1923–1928
- Total produced: 64
Specifications
- Configuration
  - Whyte: 4-6-2
- Gauge: 4 ft 8 1/2 in (1,435 mm) standard gauge
- Leading dia.: 33 in (838 mm)
- Driver dia.: 73 in (1,854 mm)
- Trailing dia.: 43 in (1,092 mm)
- Wheelbase: 13 ft 0 in (3.962 m)
- Frame type: Bar
- Axle load: 61 long tons (62.0 t)
- Adhesive weight: 182,000 lbf (809.6 kN)
- Tender type: 3 axle bogie (1926 order), 2 axle bogie (1923 and 1928 orders)
- Fuel type: Coal
- Fuel capacity: 16 long tons (16.3 t)
- Water cap.: 10,000 imp gal (45,000 L) (1923 order), 14,000 imp gal (64,000 L) (1926 order), 12,000 imp gal (55,000 L) (1928 order)
- Firebox
  - Grate area: 70.5 ft^{2} (6.550 m^{2})
- Boiler pressure: 200 psi (1,380 kPa)
- Feedwater heater: 1923 batch: Worthington; 1926 and 1928 batches: Elesco; No. 1409: Coffin, later Worthington
- Cylinders: Two, outside
- Cylinder size: 27 in (686 mm) bore 28 in (711 mm) stroke
- Valve gear: 1923 and 1926 batches: Baker, later Walschaerts; 1928 batch: Walschaerts
Performance figures
- Maximum speed: 60–80 mph (97–129 km/h)
- Power output: 2,624 hp (1,957 kW)
- Tractive effort: 47,535 lb (21.6 tonnes)
- Factor of adh.: 3.79
Career
- Operators: Southern Railway (SOU), Cincinnati, New Orleans and Texas Pacific Railway (CNO&TP), Alabama Great Southern Railroad (AGS)
- Class: Ps-4
- Number in class: 64
- Numbers: SOU No. 1366–1409; AGS No. 6684–6691; CNO&TP No. 6471–6482
- Nicknames: First Ladies of the Pacifics; Harrison Engines
- Delivered: 1923–1928
- Withdrawn: 1949–1952
- Preserved: No. 1401
- Disposition: One preserved, remainder scrapped

The Southern Railway Ps-4 was a class of 4-6-2 "Pacific" type steam locomotives built for the Southern Railway (SOU), as well as its subsidiaries, the Alabama Great Southern (AGS) and the Cincinnati, New Orleans and Texas Pacific (CNO&TP). They were designed to be the primary mainline locomotives pulling SOU's heavy passenger trains between Washington, D.C. and Atlanta, Georgia, including the CNO&TP trains between Cincinnati, Ohio and Jacksonville, Florida, as well as the AGS trains between Chattanooga, Tennessee and Meridian, Mississippi, via Birmingham, Alabama.

The first batch were built between 1923 and 1924 by American Locomotive Company's (ALCO) Schenectady Works in Schenectady, New York. These locomotives were originally painted black with gold linings and lettering until 1926, when they were all repainted in a brand-new Virginian green and gold paint scheme. This would include the next batch of Ps-4s, which were built at ALCO's Richmond Works in Richmond, Virginia, and signified as the First Ladies of the Pacifics around the SOU system. In 1928, the last batch of Ps-4s were built by Baldwin Locomotive Works (BLW) in Philadelphia, Pennsylvania. They were all later repainted in a lighter Sylvan green paint in the early 1930s.

In the 1940s, the Ps-4s were relegated to haul local mainline passenger trains and mail trains as their duties were taken over by SOU's new Electro-Motive Diesel (EMD) E6 diesel locomotives. Despite this, the Ps-4s were used in motive power pool service, where they were called in to pull the mainline passenger trains again whenever one of the diesel locomotives was unavailable. By 1949, their retirement began and all but one were scrapped in 1953.

No. 1401 was spared from scrap and was donated to Smithsonian Institution, where it was put on permanent display at the National Museum of American History in Washington, D.C., around late 1961 as the sole survivor of the Southern Railway Ps-4 class, which have been regarded by Smithsonian curator John H. White Jr. as being "among the most celebrated passenger locomotives operated in the United States...."

== History ==
=== Development and origins ===
During the 1920s, the Southern Railway's (SOU) roster consisted of smaller Ps-2 class 4-6-2 Pacifics that could not handle the longer and heavier mainline passenger trains between Washington, D.C., and Atlanta. Although there were Ts and Ts-1 class 4-8-2 locomotives valid enough to handle this work, they could not be relocated to some of SOU's routes over and over. The SOU decided to order the more powerful Ps-4 Heavy Pacific class with the first batches built in 1923 by American Locomotive Company's (ALCO) Schenectady Works in Schenectady, New York, with 12 of them, Nos. 1375-1386, delivered to SOU; and four of them, Nos. 6684-6687, for the SOU's Alabama Great Southern (AGS) subsidiary.

The Ps-4s were derived from the standard USRA Heavy Pacific design, but had notable differences based on the SOU's standards. They had a more spacious cab, smaller 73 in (1,778 mm) driving wheels, a slightly shorter boiler, an additional firebox combustion chamber, and a Worthington 3-B feedwater heater mounted on the running board of the fireman's side. These arrangements made the locomotives produce 47,535 lb (21.6 tonnes) of tractive effort, allowing them to pull 14 passenger cars at 80 mph (129 km/h) on the Piedmont terrains between Washington, D.C., and Atlanta. Salisbury, North Carolina was also the place where each Ps-4 locomotives were swapped out every 300 miles (480 km) or 150 miles (240 km), depending on the stops for refuel. They were originally painted black with gold leaf lining and lettering.

The Ps-4 locomotives were designed to pull SOU's most famous mainline passenger trains, including the Piedmont Limited, the Aiken-Augusta Special, the Peach Queen, and the Birmingham Special on flat terrains. They also pulled the Birmingham Special and Memphis Special passenger trains between Washington, D.C. and Monroe, Virginia. The SOU officials, impressed with the Ps-4s' excellent performance, ordered 15 more locomotives from ALCO in 1924, while the other five were assigned to the Cincinnati, New Orleans and Texas Pacific (CNO&TP) subsidiary. The first nine SOU locomotives were numbered 1366-1374, while the remaining six were numbered 1387-1392, filling in on either sides of the 1923 group. The CNO&TP Ps-4s were numbered 6471-6475 and were assigned to pull the Royal Palm, Ponce de Leon, and Florida Sunbeam trains, among others.

=== The first ladies of the pacifics ===
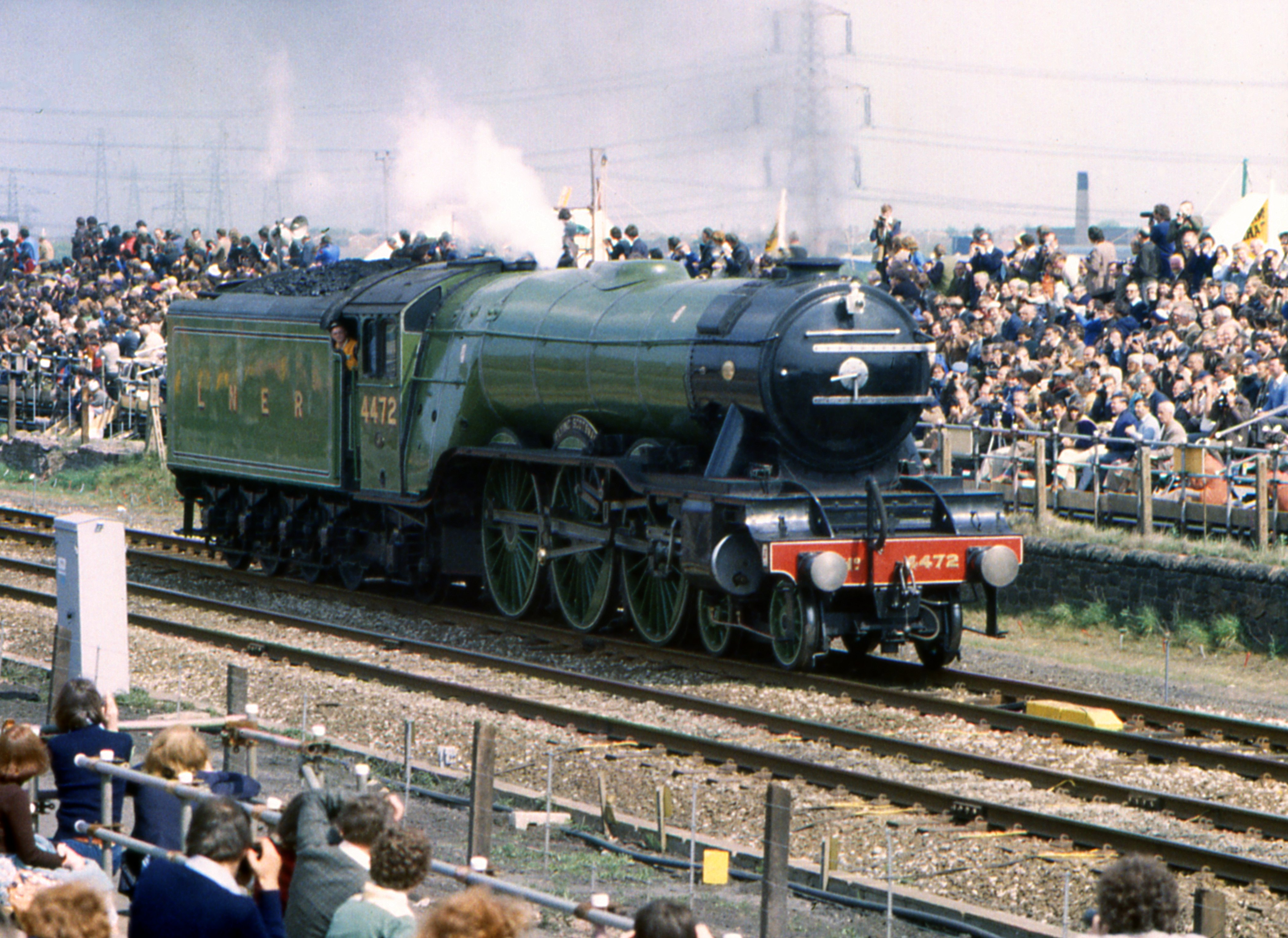
No. 4472 Flying Scotsman, an example of an LNER apple green steam locomotive, which inspired Harrison to have the Ps-4 locomotives painted green.

In 1925, SOU president Fairfax Harrison traveled to the United Kingdom, where he admired the country's London and North Eastern Railway's apple green passenger steam locomotives. Harrison's trip had inspired the appearance of the second order of Ps-4s built in the summer of 1926 by ALCO's Richmond Works by having them painted in Virginian green with gold leaf lining and lettering. This would include the original first batches. The second order consisted of twelve locomotives numbered 1393-1404 for SOU, seven numbered 6476-6482 for the CNO&TP, and four numbered 6688-6691 for the AGS.

Aside from the paint scheme, which would soon be applied to all of Southern's other passenger locomotive classes, the second order had other notable differences. They featured an Elesco feedwater heater mounted on top of the smokebox between the stack and bell instead of under the running boards. In comparison with the two-axle bogie, 10,000 US gallons (38,000 L) standard USRA tender design used on the first order, the 1926 Ps-4s were equipped with a larger three-axle bogie tender with a water capacity of 14,000 US gallons (53,000 L) designed for long-distance passenger runs and eliminating multiple water stops, excluding Monroe, Virginia and Greenville, South Carolina. The larger tenders' trucks were manufactured from General Steel Castings. The 1926 locomotives were affectionally nicknamed the Harrison Engines. They were also the last passenger steam locomotives that ALCO have built at their Richmond Works before its closure in 1927.

The first four 1926 Ps-4s, Nos. 1393-1396, were lettered for the new Washington, D.C.-Atlanta Crescent Limited passenger train on both sides of their tenders with the word "SOUTHERN" appeared on sides of the raised tender coal bunkers. The letter "C" was shaped to look like a Crescent moon. Nos. 1393-1396 also sported the Crescent moon decals on their cylinders and the front cab panels beside the engineer and fireman's windows. Nos. 1393 and 1394 were based in Atlanta, where they operated between there and Salisbury, pulling the Crescent Limited. Nos. 1395 and 1396 were situated at Salisbury's neighboring Spencer, North Carolina to handle the Crescent Limited's run between Salisbury and Washington, D.C. The other Ps-4s, Nos. 1397-1404, were assigned to regular pool passenger service, pulling other Washington D.C.-Atlanta passenger trains and even the Crescent Limited. Nos. 1397-1400, and 1404 were assigned to run between Salisbury and Washington, D.C., while Nos. 1401-1403 do their passenger runs between Atlanta and Salisbury. Nos. 1393, 1394, 1401, 1402, and 1403 were maintained at SOU's South (Pegram) Shops in Atlanta, while Nos. 1395-1400 and No. 1404 were maintained at SOU's Spencer Shops in Spencer. AGS Nos. 6688-6690 were lettered for the Queen & Crescent Limited.

The final Ps-4s were built in April 1928 by the Baldwin Locomotive Works, consisting of only five locomotives for SOU, Nos. 1405-1409. These locomotives were equipped with smaller tenders unlike the second order, but still larger than those of the first order, featuring two-axle bogies and a capacity of 12,000-gallon of water. They were also built with Walschaerts valve gear as opposed to the previous orders which were equipped with Baker valve gear. The final locomotive of the series, No. 1409, featured an extended smokebox and a Coffin feedwater heater. All of the Baldwin Ps-4s were based in Atlanta, where they ran from there to Macon, Georgia on the southbound run and Chattanooga, Tennessee on the northbound run, pulling the Ponce de Leon and Royal Palm passenger trains. Their maintenance site was based at the Pegram Shops. They were also the last passenger steam locomotives that SOU have ordered.

The SOU had an optional equipment policy, where they allowed their engineers, firemen, and workshop employees to decorate the Ps-4s with two brass candlesticks flanked on their headlight, a brass spread eagle ornament mounted in front of their smokebox door above the headlight, and Masonic emblems. In the early 1930s, the Virginian green paint scheme on all of the Ps-4s and other passenger engines was replaced with a lighter shade of green also known as Sylvan green. Around 1934, the gold leaf paint for the lining and lettering was replaced with Dulux imitation gold paint since the former was not visible in black and white photographs, especially at certain angles. Because of the Ps-4s' green and gold paint scheme, they were signified as the First Ladies of the Pacifics by Trains Magazine writer H.S. Bryant Jr.

=== Whistles ===
The Ps-4s were initially equipped with a standard Crosby 6 inch 3-chime whistle. Some of them were equipped with different types of whistles per the engineers' choices such as a Finley Shops three-chambered "town whistle" mounted right behind AGS No. 6691's stack. Nos. 1369 and 1407 were equipped with a single-tone air horn, mounted on next to their smokebox. Between 1938 and 1941, the Ps-4s were re-equipped with a deeper sounding long-bell 3-chime "steamboat" whistle, manufactured from SOU's Lenoir Car Works in Lenoir City, Tennessee.

=== Locomotives roster ===
==== Southern ====
SOU Ps-4 locomotive details
Road number	Feedwater heater type	Built date	Builder	Serial number	Disposal date	Notes
1366	Worthington	1924	ALCO Schenectady Works	66065	July 29, 1953	This locomotive and No. 1406 pulled the Franklin Roosevelt funeral train's final leg of the journey from Monroe, Virginia to Washington, D.C. in April 1945. It was eventually sold for scrap to the Baltimore Steel Company in Baltimore, Maryland.
1367	Worthington	1924	ALCO Schenectady Works	66066	January 16, 1953	This locomotive and No. 1400 pulled the Franklin Roosevelt funeral train's third leg of the journey from Salisbury, North Carolina to Monroe in April 1945. It was later scrapped at SOU's Hayne Shops.
1368	Worthington	1924	ALCO Schenectady Works	66067	July 29, 1953	Sold for scrap to the Baltimore Steel Company in Baltimore, Maryland.
1369	Worthington	1924	ALCO Schenectady Works	66068	July 29, 1953	Sold for scrap to the Baltimore Steel Company in Baltimore, Maryland.
1370	Worthington	1924	ALCO Schenectady Works	66069	January 1952	Sold for scrap to the Baltimore Steel Company in Baltimore, Maryland.
1371	Worthington	1924	ALCO Schenectady Works	66070	October 17, 1952	Scrapped at SOU's Hayne Shops in Spartanburg, South Carolina.
1372	Worthington	1924	ALCO Schenectady Works	66071	July 29, 1953	Sold for scrap to the Baltimore Steel Company in Baltimore, Maryland.
1373	Worthington	1924	ALCO Schenectady Works	66072	April 1952	Sold for scrap to the Baltimore Steel Company in Baltimore, Maryland.
1374	Worthington	1924	ALCO Schenectady Works	66073	November 1952	Sold for scrap to the Baltimore Steel Company in Baltimore, Maryland.
1375	Worthington	1923	ALCO Schenectady Works	64852	January 1952	Sold for scrap to the Baltimore Steel Company in Baltimore, Maryland.
1376	Worthington	1923	ALCO Schenectady Works	64853	November 1952	Sold for scrap to the Baltimore Steel Company in Baltimore, Maryland.
1377	Worthington	1923	ALCO Schenectady Works	64854	November 1952	Sold for scrap to the Baltimore Steel Company in Baltimore, Maryland.
1378	Worthington	1923	ALCO Schenectady Works	64855	October 17, 1952	Scrapped at SOU's Hayne Shops in Spartanburg, South Carolina.
1379	Worthington	1923	ALCO Schenectady Works	64856	July 29, 1953	Sold for scrap to the Baltimore Steel Company in Baltimore, Maryland.
1380	Worthington	1923	ALCO Schenectady Works	64857	July 29, 1953	Streamlined for the Tennessean and swapping its original tender with No. 1400 in 1941. Sold for scrap to the Baltimore Steel Company in Baltimore, Maryland.
1381	Worthington	1923	ALCO Schenectady Works	64858	January 1952	Sold for scrap to the Baltimore Steel Company in Baltimore, Maryland.
1382	Worthington	1923	ALCO Schenectady Works	64859	July 29, 1953	Sold for scrap to the Baltimore Steel Company in Baltimore, Maryland.
1383	Worthington	1923	ALCO Schenectady Works	64860	February 1952	Sold for scrap to the Baltimore Steel Company in Baltimore, Maryland.
1384	Worthington	1923	ALCO Schenectady Works	64861	November 1952	Sold for scrap to the Baltimore Steel Company in Baltimore, Maryland.
1385	Worthington	1923	ALCO Schenectady Works	64862	July 29, 1953	This locomotive and No. 1401 pulled the Franklin Roosevelt funeral train's second leg of the journey from Greenville, South Carolina to Salisbury in April 1945. Sold for scrap to the Baltimore Steel Company in Baltimore, Maryland.
1386	Worthington	1923	ALCO Schenectady Works	64863	October 1952	Sold for scrap to the Baltimore Steel Company in Baltimore, Maryland.
1387	Worthington	1924	ALCO Schenectady Works	66059	April 1952	Sold for scrap to the Baltimore Steel Company in Baltimore, Maryland.
1388	Worthington	1924	ALCO Schenectady Works	66060	October 1952	Sold for scrap to the Baltimore Steel Company in Baltimore, Maryland.
1389	Worthington	1924	ALCO Schenectady Works	66061	February 1952	It hauled the re-equipped streamlined Crescent passenger train in June 1948. Sold for scrap to the Baltimore Steel Company in Baltimore, Maryland.
1390	Worthington	1924	ALCO Schenectady Works	66062	July 29, 1953	Sold for scrap to the Baltimore Steel Company in Baltimore, Maryland.
1391	Worthington	1924	ALCO Schenectady Works	66063	November 1952	Sold for scrap to the Baltimore Steel Company in Baltimore, Maryland.
1392	Worthington	1924	ALCO Richmond Works	66064	November 1952	Sold for scrap to the Baltimore Steel Company in Baltimore, Maryland.
1393	Elesco	June 1926	ALCO Schenectady Works	66880	July 29, 1953	During December 1952, this locomotive was originally offered to be donated to the Smithsonian Institution in Washington, D.C., who turned it down in favor of No. 1401. In April 1953, it was refurbished as a static display at the Spencer Shops for the Rowan County's bicentennial anniversary. It was offered to the Government of Atlanta for preservation display in the Atlanta city area, only to be rejected and sold for scrap to the Baltimore Steel Company in Baltimore, Maryland.
1394	Elesco	June 1926	ALCO Richmond Works	66881	April 1952	This locomotive and No. 1409 pulled the Franklin Roosevelt funeral train's first leg of the journey from Atlanta to Greenville in April 1945. Sold for scrap to the Baltimore Steel Company in Baltimore, Maryland.
1395	Elesco	June 1926	ALCO Richmond Works	66882	October 1952	It pull the private presidential train of Franklin Roosevelt in 1938. Sold for scrap to the Baltimore Steel Company in Baltimore, Maryland.
1396	Elesco	June 1926	ALCO Schenectady Works	66883	February 1952	During the 1940s, its feedwater heater was modified deeper into the smokebox, similar to the unstreamlined New York Central J3a Hudsons, while the pipes connecting to the feedwater heater were concealed into the smokebox section. Sold for scrap to the Baltimore Steel Company in Baltimore, Maryland.
1397	Elesco	June 1926	ALCO Richmond Works	66884	February 1952	Sold for scrap to the Baltimore Steel Company in Baltimore, Maryland.
1398	Elesco	June 1926	ALCO Richmond Works	66885	January 1952	Sold for scrap to the Baltimore Steel Company in Baltimore, Maryland.
1399	Elesco	July 1926	ALCO Richmond Works	66886	November 1949	This was the first Ps-4 locomotive to be scrapped at SOU's Hayne Shops in Spartanburg, South Carolina. Its tender was salvaged and connected to No. 6690.
1400	Elesco	July 1926	ALCO Richmond Works	66887	January 1952	This locomotive swapped its original tender with No. 1380 in 1941. It and No. 1367 pulled the Franklin Roosevelt funeral train's third leg of the journey from Salisbury to Monroe in April 1945.
1401	Elesco	July 1926	ALCO Richmond Works	66888	January 1962	This locomotive and No. 1385 pulled the Franklin Roosevelt funeral train's second leg of the journey from Greenville to Salisbury in April 1945. It was donated to the Smithsonian Institution in Washington, D.C. and preserved as a static display exhibit at the National Museum of American History.
1402	Elesco	July 1926	ALCO Richmond Works	66889	November 1952	Sold for scrap to the Baltimore Steel Company in Baltimore, Maryland.
1403	Elesco	July 1926	ALCO Richmond Works	66890	October 1952	Sold for scrap to the Baltimore Steel Company in Baltimore, Maryland.
1404	Elesco	July 1926	ALCO Richmond Works	66891	February 1952	Sold for scrap to the Baltimore Steel Company in Baltimore, Maryland.
1405	Elesco	April 1928	Baldwin Locomotive Works	60461	November 1952	Sold for scrap to the Baltimore Steel Company in Baltimore, Maryland.
1406	Elesco	April 1928	Baldwin Locomotive Works	60462	November 1952	This locomotive and No. 1366 pulled the Franklin Roosevelt funeral train's final leg of the journey from Monroe, Virginia to Washington, D.C. in April 1945. It hauled the streamlined Southerner passenger train No. 47 on May 23, 1950. It was later sold for scrap to the Baltimore Steel Company in Baltimore, Maryland. Its whistle was owned by SOU Master Mechanic of steam Bill Purdie, who put it on ex-No. 750 circa 1974-75, next on SOU No. 630 circa 1976-77, then on No. 610 circa 1977-78, and finally on No. 2839 circa 1979-80.
1407	Elesco	April 1928	Baldwin Locomotive Works	60463	November 1952	Sold for scrap to the Baltimore Steel Company in Baltimore, Maryland.
1408	Elesco	April 1928	Baldwin Locomotive Works	60464	October 1952	Sold for scrap to the Baltimore Steel Company in Baltimore, Maryland.
1409	Coffin (later Worthington)	April 1928	Baldwin Locomotive Works	60465	January 1952	The locomotive's original Coffin feedwater heater was removed in the 1940s in favor of the Worthington SA type. It and No. 1394 pulled the Franklin Roosevelt Funeral train's first leg of the journey from Atlanta to Greensville in April 1945. It was later sold for scrap to the Baltimore Steel Company in Baltimore, Maryland.

==== Cincinnati, New Orleans and Texas Pacific ====
CNO&TP Ps-4 locomotive details
Road number	Feedwater heater type	Built date	Builder	Serial number	Disposal date	Notes
6471	Worthington	1924	ALCO Schenectady Works	66108	November 1952	Sold for scrap to the Baltimore Steel Company in Baltimore, Maryland.
6472	Worthington	1924	ALCO Schenectady Works	66109	August 1953	Sold for scrap to the Baltimore Steel Company in Baltimore, Maryland.
6473	Worthington	1924	ALCO Schenectady Works	66110	March 1953	Scrapped at SOU's Hayne Shops in Spartanburg, South Carolina.
6474	Worthington	1924	ALCO Schenectady Works	66111	November 1952	Sold for scrap to the Baltimore Steel Company in Baltimore, Maryland.
6475	Worthington	1924	ALCO Schenectady Works	66112	November 1952	Sold for scrap to the Baltimore Steel Company in Baltimore, Maryland.
6476	Elsco	1926	ALCO Richmond Works	66892	May 1953	Scrapped at SOU's Finley Shops in Birmingham, Alabama.
6477	Elsco	1926	ALCO Richmond Works	66893	May 1953	Scrapped at SOU's Finley Shops in Birmingham, Alabama.
6478	Elsco	1926	ALCO Richmond Works	66894	May 1953	Scrapped at SOU's Finley Shops in Birmingham, Alabama.
6479	Elsco	1926	ALCO Richmond Works	66895	November 1952	Sold for scrap to the Baltimore Steel Company in Baltimore, Maryland.
6480	Elsco	1926	ALCO Richmond Works	66896	December 1952	Retired in Chattanooga, Tennessee.
6481	Elsco	1926	ALCO Richmond Works	66897	May 1953	Scrapped at SOU's Finley Shops in Birmingham, Alabama.
6482	Elsco	1926	ALCO Richmond Works	66898	August 1953	Sold for scrap to the Baltimore Steel Company in Baltimore, Maryland.

==== Alabama Great Southern ====
The AGS Ps-4s pulled the Queen & Crescent Limited on the Queen and Crescent Route between Chattanooga, Tennessee and Meridian, Mississippi. These locomotives were maintained at AGS' Finley Shops in Birmingham, Alabama. In 1949, Nos. 6689-6691 were deemed surplus and transferred over to SOU's Charlotte Division, where they were maintained at the Spencer Shops.

AGS Ps-4 locomotive details
Road number	Feedwater heater type	Built date	Builder	Serial number	Disposal date	Notes
6684	Worthington	1923	ALCO Schenectady Works	64864	December 1949	Scrapped at SOU's Hayne Shops in Spartanburg, South Carolina.
6685	Worthington	1923	ALCO Schenectady Works	64865	December 1949	Scrapped at SOU's Hayne Shops in Spartanburg, South Carolina.
6686	Worthington	1923	ALCO Schenectady Works	64866	December 1949	
6687	Worthington	1923	ALCO Schenectady Works	64867	July 29, 1953	Sold for scrap to the Baltimore Steel Company in Baltimore, Maryland.
6688	Elsco	1926	ALCO Richmond Works	66899	December 1950	
6689	Elsco	1926	ALCO Richmond Works	66900	November 1952	
6690	Elsco	1926	ALCO Richmond Works	66901	August 1953	During 1949, this locomotive was given another tender, which came from No. 1399 that was recently scrapped. No. 6690 was sold for scrap to the Baltimore Steel Company in Baltimore, Maryland.
6691	Elsco	1926	ALCO Richmond Works	66902	August 1953	Sold for scrap to the Baltimore Steel Company in Baltimore, Maryland.

=== Modernizing and retirement ===
In the mid-late 1930s, the 1923-1926 Ps-4s were re-equipped with Walschaerts valve gear because the SOU mechanical officers disliked the Baker type tended to reverse itself at high-speed, damaging the locomotives' running gear and the rails. Additionally, their original long, sharply pointed pilots were replaced with shorter "boiler tube" style pilots to accommodate themselves to couple front to front. Around the late 1930s, most of the Ps-4s had their sand pipes concealed into the boiler cladding. In 1941, SOU began to modernize their premier passenger trains with their new EMD E6 diesel locomotives to pull. The Ps-4s were relegated to haul the all-stops Washington, D.C. to Atlanta local passenger and mail train Nos. 135 and 136, along with the Danville, Virginia to Greenville, South Carolina local passenger train Nos. 11 and 12. Additionally, the Ps-4s were in motive power pool service, where they were called in to pull premier mainline passenger trains again to protect the passenger schedules whenever one of the diesel locomotives was unavailable to operate. They would also occasionally pull stainless steel Budd streamlined passenger cars, which had re-equipped SOU's older passenger train consist such as the Crescent and debuted on newer passenger trains such as the Southerner.

Due to the outbreak of World War II and wartime restrictions placed on all of the railroads, SOU was unable to purchase more diesel locomotives, and opted to modify their steam locomotives, including the Ps-4s. As such, all of the Ps-4s were re-equipped with multiple-bearing crossheads to replace their original alligator crossheads. Most of the Ps-4s also have their tender coal bunkers expanded to hold up more coal. Nos. 1366-1409 were all rebuilt with the raised front running board valve ladders to allow more room around their cylinders and running gear for the crew to maintain the mechanical lubricating system. No. 1380 was given a bullet-nose streamlining design by Otto Kuhler for use on SOU's new Tennessean service, which operated between Washington, D.C., and Monroe, Virginia, connecting in the latter to the Norfolk and Western Railway, who had assigned its streamlined J class engines to its connecting lines. After the war ended, SOU resumed dieselization and by late 1949, the Ps-4s were beginning to retire from revenue service. In May 1952, the last Ps-4s to be retired from revenue service were Nos. 6472 and 6691 running on the Danville Division.

=== Preservation ===
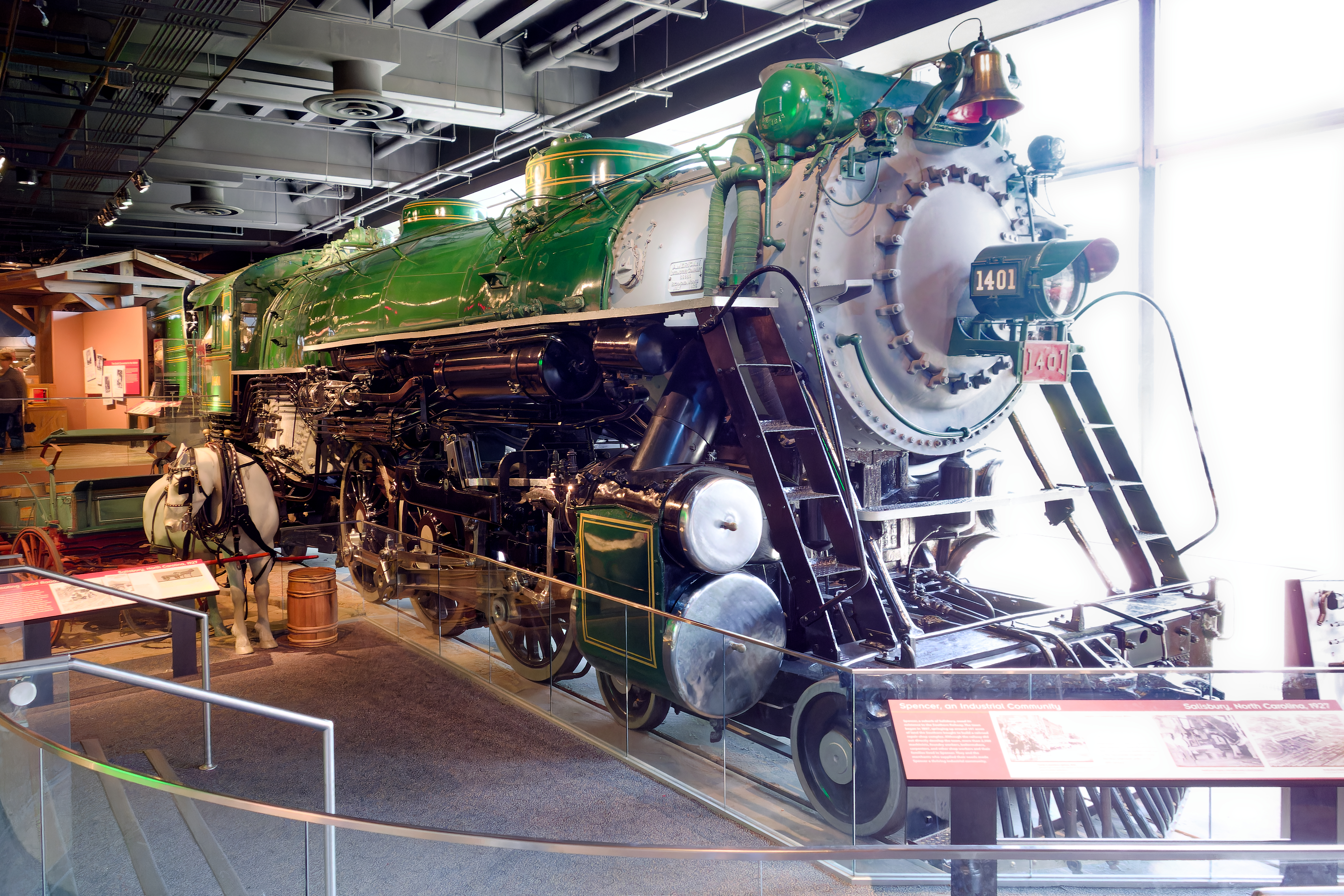
Southern Railway Ps-4 No. 1401 on display at the National Museum of American History in 2013

During 1952, railfan Walter H. Thrall and SOU board member W. Graham Claytor Jr. requested SOU president Harry A. DeButts to salvage one of the Ps-4 locomotives from the scrap line for preservation. In 1953, No. 1401 of the 1926 batch was chosen and donated to the Smithsonian Institution in Washington, D.C., since it was recognized to be one of the eight Ps-4 locomotives hauling the funeral train of U.S. President Franklin Roosevelt in April 1945. In 1961, the No. 1401 locomotive was cosmetically restored and transported via flatbed truck to the Smithsonian's under construction National Museum of American History, which opened in early 1964. No. 1401 currently remains on static display at the museum as the sole survivor of the Southern Railway Ps-4.

== See also ==
- Atlanta and West Point 290

== Bibliography ==
- Bryant Jr., H. Stafford (October 1950). "Ps-4". Trains. Vol. 10, no. 12. Kalmbach Publishing. pp. 20–26.
- Bryant Jr., H. Stafford (1962). The Georgian Locomotive (1st ed.). Weathervane. OCLC 3004841.
- Davis, Burke (1985). The Southern Railway: Roads of the Innovators (1st ed.). The University of North Carolina Press. ISBN 0-8078-1636-1.
- Drury, George (2015). Guide to North American Steam Locomotives, Revised Edition (2nd ed.). Kalmbach Media. ISBN 978-1-62700-259-2.
- Fitt, William C. (1973). Southern Ps-4 Class Pacific Locomotive Drawings (1st ed.). Wildwood Publications. ISBN 0-914104-00-4.
- Flanary, Ron (May 2007). "The Green Goddesses". Railfan & Railroad. Vol. 26, no. 5. Carstens Publications. pp. 46–53.
- Galloway, Duane; Wrinn, Jim (1996). Southern Railway's Spencer Shops: 1896-1996. TLC Publishing Inc. ISBN 1-883089-23-9.
- Loy, Sallie; Hillman, Dick; Cates, C. Pat (2005). The Southern Railway: Further Recollections. Images of Rail (1st ed.). Arcadia Publishing. ISBN 978-0-7385-1831-2.
- Prince, Richard E. (1970). Steam Locomotives and Boats: Southern Railway System (2nd ed.). Wheelwright Lithographing Company. ISBN 0-9600088-4-5.
- Ranks, Harold; Lowe, Shelby (1966). Southern Steam Power (1st ed.). Barnhart Press.
- Roberts, Dale (March–April 1994). "Fairfax Harrison's Aristocrats: A Photo Study of the Most Elegant Group of Ps-4 Pacifics". TIES Magazine. Vol. 8, no. 2. Southern Railway Historical Association. pp. 4–17.
- Roberts, Dale; King, Ed (January 2008). "Ps-4ever". Trains. Vol. 68, no. 1. Kalmbach Publishing. pp. 60–67.
- Tillotson Jr., Curt (2000). Classic Steam Trains of the South (1st ed.). TLC Publishing. ISBN 1-883089-55-7.
- Tillotson Jr., Curt (2004). Southern Railway Steam Trains Volume 1 – Passenger (1st ed.). TLC Publishing. ISBN 1-883089-94-8.
- Withuhn, Bill (Winter 2009). "Our National Locomotive". Classic Trains. Vol. 10, no. 4. Kalmbach Publishing. pp. 37–39.
- Wrinn, Jim (2000). Steam's Camelot: Southern and Norfolk Southern Excursions in Color (1st ed.). TLC Publishing. ISBN 1-883089-56-5.
