= Renault 24CV =

Car models

The Renault 24cv models PI and PZ were produced as 1927 and 1928 models only. The cars were made to distributor order and as sales were very low production was small. Both featured the new three spring rear suspension that provided much improved roadholding and handling. The 6-cylinder motor (85 x 140) was also uprated to 85 hp (63 kW) and a four-speed gearbox fitted. Other running gear, including the servo brakes were identical to the 40cv which had the 110 x 160 motor. This was the last model year of the 6-cylinder large cars.

The PI were the open cars on short and long chassis. PZ were closed cars on long or very long chassis. All were available with two side-mounted spare wheels or the signature dual rear-mounted wheels to emphasize the long bonnet.
