= PS4 (disambiguation) =

The PlayStation 4 is a video game console by Sony Computer Entertainment.

PS4, Ps-4 or Ps 4 may also refer to:

- Psalm 4
- Phantasy Star IV: The End of the Millennium, sometimes abbreviated to PS4, a role-playing game for the Mega Drive
- Squirt PS4, a product by Leatherman
- 1986 PS4, the main-belt asteroid 5950 Leukippos
- Southern Railway Ps-4 class, a 4-6-2 steam locomotive
