= Atlanta and West Point 290 =

Preserved American 4-6-2 locomotive in Georgia

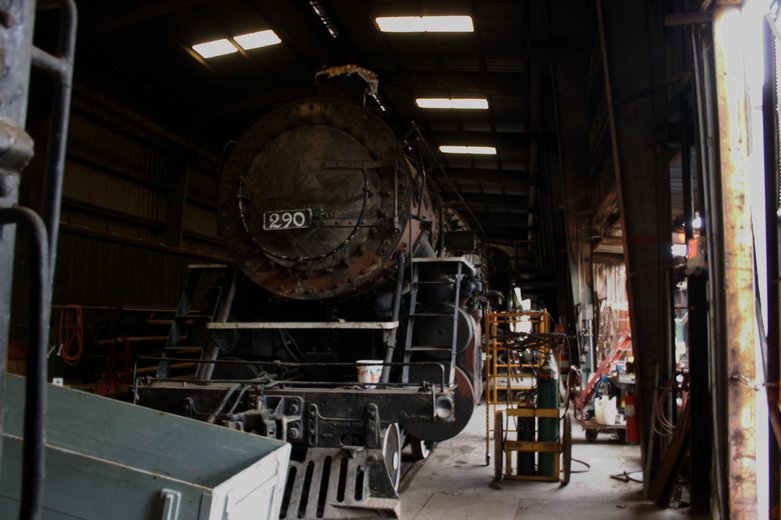
- A&WP No. 290 at the Southeastern Railway Museum shops, awaiting for a cosmetic restoration in December 2009
Type and origin
- Power type: Steam
- Builder: Lima Locomotive Works
- Serial number: 7008
- Build date: March 1926
Specifications
- Configuration
  - Whyte: 4-6-2
  - UIC: 2′C1′ h2
- Gauge: 4 ft 8 1/2 in (1,435 mm) standard gauge
- Leading dia.: 33 in (0.838 m)
- Driver dia.: 74 in (1.880 m)
- Trailing dia.: 43 in (1.092 m)
- Length: 72 ft 5 in (22.07 m)
- Adhesive weight: 192,500 lb (87.3 t)
- Loco weight: 303,500 lb (137.7 t)
- Total weight: 504,000 lb (228.6 t)
- Fuel type: Coal
- Fuel capacity: Old tender: 15 t (15 long tons; 17 short tons); New tender: 20 t (20 long tons; 22 short tons)
- Water cap.: Old tender: 11,000 US gal (42,000 L; 9,200 imp gal); New tender: 9,500 US gal (36,000 L; 7,900 imp gal)
- Boiler pressure: 200 psi (1.38 MPa)
- Cylinders: Two, outside
- Cylinder size: 27 in × 28 in (686 mm × 711 mm)
- Valve gear: Baker
- Valve type: Piston valves
- Loco brake: Air
- Train brakes: Air
- Couplers: Knuckle
Performance figures
- Maximum speed: 90 mph (145 km/h)
- Tractive effort: 47,500 lb (21.5 tonnes)
- Factor of adh.: 4.11
Career
- Operators: Atlanta and West Point Railroad; New Georgia Railroad
- Class: P-74
- Number in class: 1st of 2
- Numbers: AWP 290
- Retired: 1954 (revenue service); December 2, 1992 (excursion service)
- Preserved: 1958
- Restored: September 1989
- Current owner: Atlanta Chapter of the National Railway Historical Society
- Disposition: Stored, awaiting cosmetic restoration

Atlanta and West Point 290 is a P-74 class 4-6-2 "Pacific" type steam locomotive built in March 1926 by the Lima Locomotive Works in Lima, Ohio for the Atlanta and West Point Railroad. With sister locomotive No. 190 built for the Western Railway of Alabama (WRA), No. 290 ferried the Southern Railway's Crescent Limited and Piedmont Limited passenger trains on the West Point Route between Atlanta, Georgia to Montgomery, Alabama until its retirement from revenue service in 1954.

In 1958, the No. 290 locomotive was preserved and put on static display at the city of Atlanta's Lakewood Park until 1961 when it was donated to the Atlanta Chapter of the National Railway Historical Society (NRHS). In 1989, the locomotive was restored to operating condition for the New Georgia Railroad (NGRX) program, running excursion trains around the Georgia state from Atlanta to Athens, Augusta, Brunswick, Macon, and Savannah on Norfolk Southern (NS) and CSX rails.

At the end of 1992, No. 290 was retired due to the State of Georgia determining to return all equipment being leased by the State from the Atlanta Chapter, NRHS. Afterwards, No. 290 was put into storage at the Southeastern Railway Museum (SRM) in Duluth, Georgia. With no plans to be restored back to operating condition, the locomotive is stored in a disassembled state inside the SRM's back shop, waiting for a full cosmetic restoration.

== History ==
=== Revenue service ===
No. 290 and sister locomotive No. 190 are both heavy P-74 Pacific steam locomotives built in March 1926 by the Lima Locomotive Works in Lima, Ohio. They were copies of the USRA Heavy Pacific design, which was the basis of the Erie K-5 design built in 1919. The primary difference is being the slightly smaller drivers of 73 in (1.854 m) as opposed to the USRA's 79 in (2.007 m) drivers. These two locomotives also had combustion chambers in their boilers as did the USRA design. No. 290 was assigned to the Atlanta and West Point Railway (A&WP), while No. 190 served the Western Railway of Alabama (WRA).

Nos. 290 and 190 were both assigned to ferry the Southern Railway's (SOU) Crescent Limited and Piedmont Limited passenger trains on the West Point Route between Atlanta, Georgia and Montgomery, Alabama. Although the WRA and A&WP were legally separate railroads, they operated as one under the common control of the Georgia Railroad. As a result locomotives from both the WRA and A&WP were common to find in both Atlanta and Montgomery. However, crews would swap in West Point, Georgia where the two lines met. When the train arrived in Montgomery, the Louisville and Nashville Railroad (L&N) would complete the final leg of both trains' journey to New Orleans, Louisiana.

During the 1940s, Nos. 290 and 190 were given upgrades such as multiple-bearing crossheads replacing their original alligator crossheads and a Standard HT mechanical stoker was added inside the tender to deliver the coal from the bunker into the firebox and preventing the fireman from shoveling coal multiple times when doing long-distance runs.

=== First retirement and attempted lease ===
In 1954, No. 190 was retired and scrapped, and No. 290 was scheduled to follow suit, but former SOU employee Emory Ivie became aware of the locomotive's disposition, so he contacted Atlanta Journal-Constitution columnist Leo Aikman and suggested that the locomotive should be preserved. Other columnists and railfans quickly petitioned the A&WP into preserving No. 290, and in May 1958, the railroad’s then-president Clyde Mixon agreed to have the locomotive donated to the city of Atlanta. In July that same year, No. 290 was put on display at the Southeastern Fairgrounds in Atlanta's Lakewood Park, and the 290 Club was formed to oversee the locomotive's display. Within ensuing years, some additional rolling stock was put on display alongside No. 290, but the expansion was hoarding up space, agitating officials from the Southeastern Fairgrounds.

In 1965, fairground officials asked for No. 290 and the rolling stock to be removed and displayed elsewhere, and the locomotive was donated to the Atlanta Chapter of the National Railway Historical Society (NRHS) with SOU vice-president of law W. Graham Claytor Jr. helping move the locomotive into storage at the Inman Yard in Atlanta. At that time, Claytor made an attempt to lease the No. 290 locomotive, with the desire to use it in SOU's steam excursion program, and to significantly alter No. 290's appearance with SOU passenger green and gold livery to resemble an SOU Ps-4 locomotive. However, the A&WP was not keen to allow one of their former locomotives to be repainted into the livery of another railroad, and they threatened to sue the SOU for $50,000 if their lease on No. 290 came to fruition. Subsequently, No. 290 was instead moved to Duluth, Georgia for display at the Atlanta Chapter's Southeastern Railway Museum.

=== Excursion service ===
In 1986, the New Georgia Railroad (NGRX), a sponsored tourist excursion railroad operated by the Georgia Building Authority in Atlanta, leased the No. 290 locomotive for use in running excursions around the Georgia state. No. 290 was towed to the Southeastern Railcar company in Duluth, Georgia for some patch-up work performed by Finnegan Boiler Works and then moved to the former Pullman Yard in Atlanta, where the full restoration work began with supervision of former Seaboard Coast Line (SCL) assistant superintendent and head of the NGRX Wallace Haywood. During the restoration work, No. 290's original tender tank was discovered to be in very poor condition and it was replaced with a newly welded one which had the coal capacity increased from 15 short tons (30,000 lb) to 20 short tons (40,000 lb) while the water capacity was decreased from 11,000 US gallons (42,000 L) to 9,500 US gallons (36,000 L).

On June 13, 1989, No. 290 underwent a successful stationary steam test at NGRX's Pullman shop. In September 1989, No. 290 was restored to operating condition and moved under its own power for the first time in 35 years. It pulled its inaugural excursion train on September 10, running from Atlanta to Macon and back. Afterwards, it continued to run more excursion to Rome, Macon, Tifton, Brunswick, and Savannah on Norfolk Southern rails. No. 290 also operated on CSX trackage, primarily on the 16-mile Atlanta Loop and the 15-mile roundtrip out of Underground Atlanta to Stone Mountain, Georgia.

In August 1990, No. 290, at the request of CSX, ran a round trip from Atlanta to Jacksonville, Florida over a period of four days. No. 290 pulled revenue freight down and back, with no diesel assist the entire trip. In Jacksonville, No. 290 was on display on the grounds of the Prime F. Osborn III Convention Center, close to the CSX Headquarters for the kickoff of the United Way fundraising campaign. The route that No. 290 took was on the ex-Atlantic Coast Line main line from Atlanta to Waycross, then from Waycross to Jacksonville. The return trip was reversed going from Jacksonville to Waycross and from Waycross back to Atlanta. No. 290 ran track speed the entire way with no mechanical breakdowns and achieved a top speed on the return trip out of Waycross of 84 mph on a long stretch of straight track pulling revenue freight and no diesels.

In early 1991, No. 290 was sent to Norfolk Southern's (NS) Norris Yard Steam Shop in Irondale, Alabama to have necessary running gear work performed. Shortly thereafter, the NGRX made an agreement with NS to borrow No. 290 as a substitute to Norfolk and Western 611 and 1218, both of which were under maintenance at that time. On April 6 and 7, No. 290 hauled two round trip excursions from Birmingham, Alabama to Chattanooga, Tennessee for the Heart of Dixie Chapter NRHS and the following weekend round trips out of Jacksonville, Florida to Valdosta, Georgia for the North Florida Chapter NRHS. Afterwards, the locomotive returned to the NGRX to continue haul more excursion trips in Georgia.

The running gear and driving axle journal problem that had been plaguing No. 290 from the very beginning of her excursion service called for an extended time in the Norris Yard Steam Shops. So, in mid-September of 1991 the New Georgia Railroad sent No. 290 back to Irondale, deadheaded in an NS freight train. For six weeks, NGRX volunteers Bill Magee and Bill Dennington, along with help from Doug Karhan, NS' Master Mechanic over the Steam Program, performed the necessary work which completely remedied the issues. No. 290 returned to Atlanta under her own power pulling a short freight train and experienced no problems at all. The next day, No. 290 ran a roundtrip special excursion to Rome, Georgia out of Atlanta, again with no more issues with hot bearings on the drivers or side rods.

With the bearing problems finally resolved, No. 290 ran a full slate of local and out of town trips for the 1992 operating season. On May 3, 1992, No. 290 was pulling four passenger cars around the CSX Atlanta Loop for a special photo charter runby. On Friday, August 21, 1992, No. 290 ran the highly anticipated excursion trip from Atlanta, Georgia to Montgomery, Alabama for the Atlanta Chapter NRHS on both ex-A&WP and WRA rails, via CSX. On the next day, No. 290 ran five round-trip excursions out of Montgomery to Sprague, Alabama before returning to Atlanta on August 23. No. 290 ran its last excursion under steam for the NGRX on December 2, 1992 on a trip around the CSX Atlanta Loop.

=== Second retirement ===
There were originally plans to have the No. 290 locomotive be ready in time for the 1994 Atlanta Chapter NRHS convention, but the NGRX program was shut down due to its sponsorship with the Georgia state government being discontinued. Additionally, both NS and CSX railroads banned mainline steam excursion trips on their trackage the following year due to liability insurance. The No. 290 locomotive is currently disassembled inside the Southeastern Railway Museum's back shop in Duluth, Georgia, waiting for a full cosmetic restoration. There are currently no plans to restore the locomotive back to operating condition again. Therefore, it will be put back on display once the cosmetic restoration work is finished.

== Appearances in media ==
In 1991, No. 290 made its first ever film appearance in the comedy-drama film Fried Green Tomatoes, starring Kathy Bates and Mary Stuart Masterson.

== See also ==
- Atlantic Coast Line 1504
- Florida East Coast 153
- Norfolk and Western 578
- Southern Pacific 2467
- Southern Pacific 2472
- Southern Railway 1401
- U.S. Sugar 148

== Bibliography ==
- Boyd, Jim (2000). The Steam Locomotive: A Century of North American Classics (1st ed.). Barnes & Noble Books. ISBN 0-7607-1627-7.
- Bryant Jr., H. Stafford (1962). The Georgian Locomotive (1st ed.). Weathervane. OCLC 3004841.
- Hanson, Robert (2007). The West Point Route: The Atlanta & West Point Rail Road and The Western Railway of Alabama. TLC Publishing. ISBN 978-0-9766201-4-3.
- Keefe, Kevin P. (December 1989). "Big, Bold, Beautiful". Trains. Vol. 50, no. 2. Kalmbach Publishing. pp. 31–33.
- Wrinn, Jim (2000). Steam's Camelot: Southern and Norfolk Southern Excursions in Color (1st ed.). TLC Publishing. ISBN 1-883089-56-5.
