= Southern Railway Spencer Shops =

- U.S. National Register of Historic Places
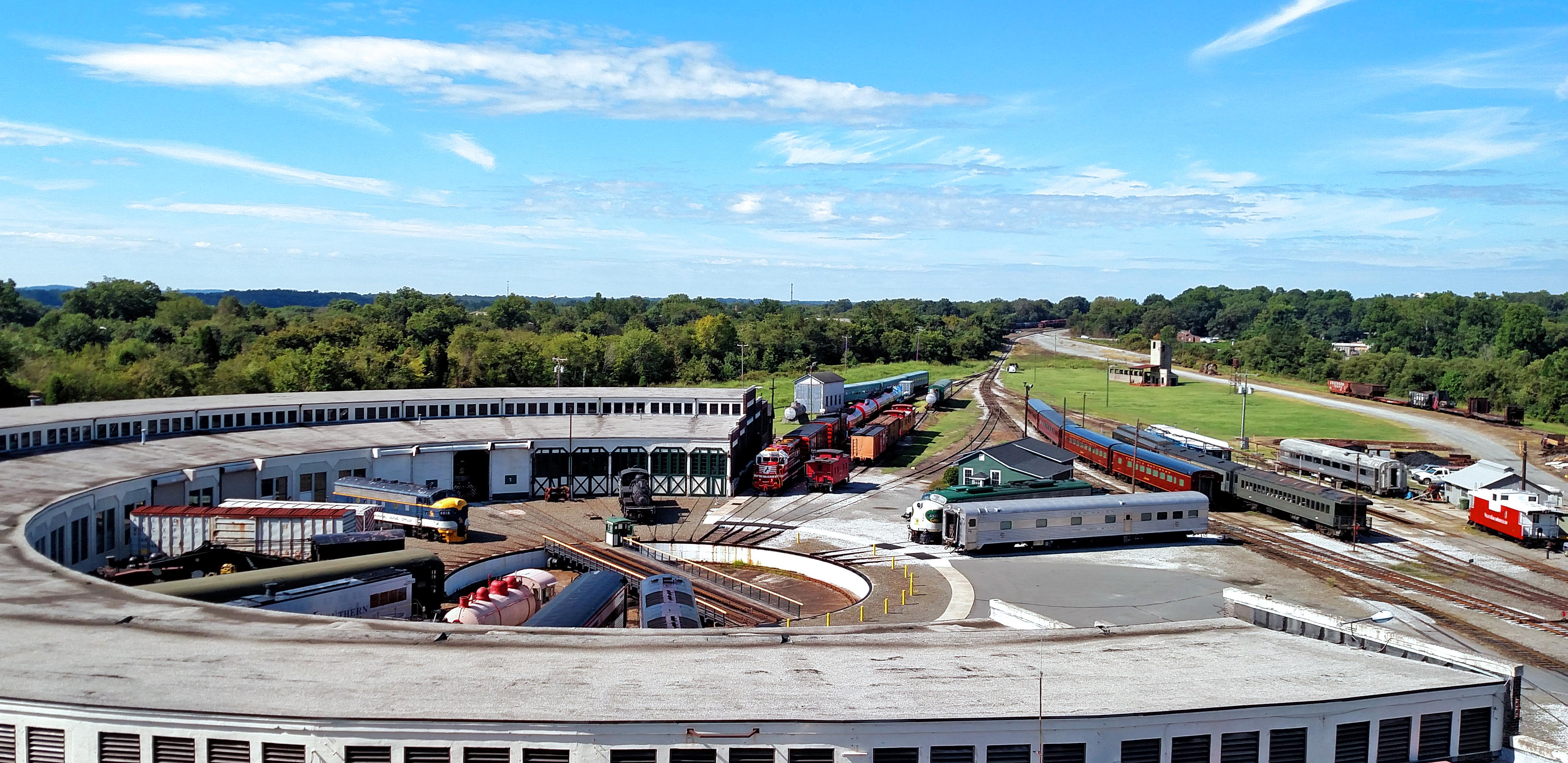
- The roundhouse and turntable at the Spencer Shops, along with a variety of preserved railroad equipment

- Location within North Carolina Location within the United States
- Location: Spencer, North Carolina
- Coordinates: 35°41′13″N 80°26′10″W
- Area: 57 acres (23 ha)
- Built: 1896
- Built by: Southern Railway Co.
- NRHP reference No.: 78001972
- Added to NRHP: March 17, 1978

The Southern Railway Spencer Shops are a former locomotive repair facility in Spencer, North Carolina. The shops were one of the Southern Railway's primary maintenance facilities. The shops were built in the 1890s and named after Southern Railway president Samuel Spencer. Following dieselization, the need for the Spencer Shops diminished, and the facilities were decommissioned in the 1970s. The Spencer Shops and associated land were donated by the Southern Railway to the state of North Carolina, which established the North Carolina Transportation Museum on the site.

== History ==
=== Background ===
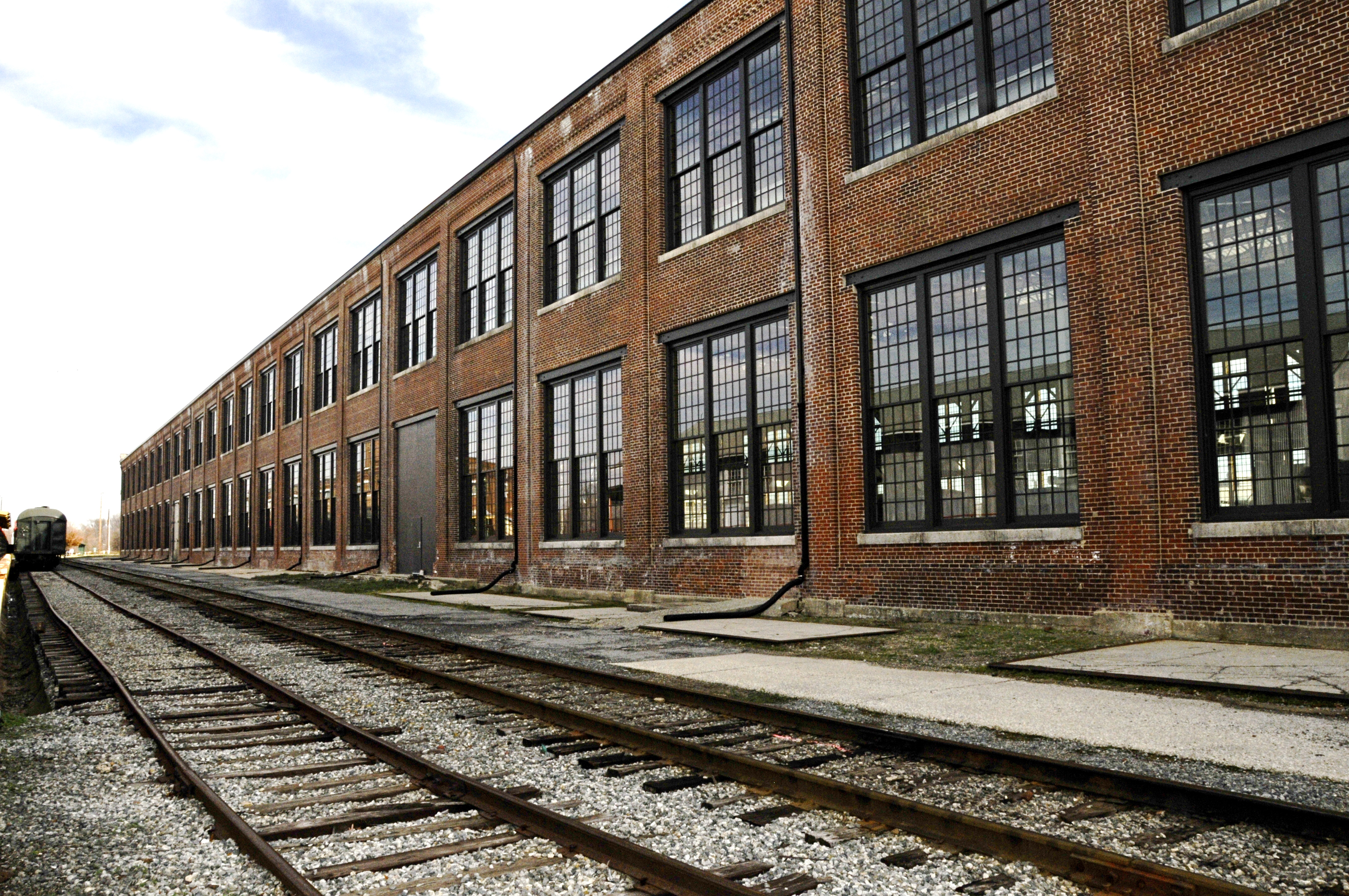
The Spencer Shops' back shop in 2008

When American financier J. P. Morgan created the new Southern Railway (SOU) during 1894, he appointed Samuel Spencer as the new railroad's president. Spencer's first task as president is merging several smaller rail lines to support the Southern States' economic development, leading to significant growth in the SOU's mileage and earnings. But after acquiring many formerly independent railroads, much of SOU's inherited locomotives and rolling stock needed heavy rebuilds and repairs in which the railroad's inadequate former North Carolina Railroad's Company Shops in Burlington, North Carolina could not handle. Spencer made it quite clear that a larger locomotive repair facility is needed on the midpoint of the 600 miles (970 km) mainline between Washington, D.C. and Atlanta, Georgia, where locomotives were swapped out every 150 miles (240 km) to be refueled and inspected for any damage or repairs if needed. Placing a major terminal and shop facility midway between the two cities with smaller terminals at the quarter marks would divide the run between Washington, D.C. and Atlanta into four segments of about 160 miles (260 km) each. The larger central shops could also be used for not only minor repairs but also full overhauls and servicing of future wrecks.

In late 1895 or early 1896, the SOU began surveying through the middle section of the Washington, D.C.-Atlanta mainline for a site to build the new shop facility that would bring hundreds of new jobs. The citizens of Charlotte, North Carolina were excited and hoped that their city was the logical choice for the complex due to its really large population. However, from SOU's point of view, they settled on Salisbury, North Carolina of the Rowan County, which was located 40 miles (64 km) northeast of Charlotte. Salisbury-based Representative John S. Henderson, who was dealing with his financial issues at the time, went into secret negotiations with the SOU officials. He proposed to buy an empty land for the new shop complex and sell it to the SOU for a cheap price he would pay, thus sparing the railroad the intense publicity of a search for an adequate location. In January 1896, he began purchasing large tracts of land two miles north of Salisbury directly on SOU's mainline. One of his largest purchases was 101.8 acres (412,000 m^{2}) from African American farmer Robert Partee at $24.50 per acre. Henderson eventually accumulated 162.2 acres (656,000 m^{2}) at the spot and sold 141 acres (570,000 m^{2}) to the SOU. When the deal was revealed to the public, a group of citizens from Charlotte persuaded Spencer to reconsider the idea of building a railway facility in downtown Charlotte. Spencer declined, stating that the plan was already finalized.

=== The beginning of the Spencer Shops ===
On March 23, 1896, SOU broke ground and the construction of the new railroad shop facility was commenced. The Pettyjohn, Wood & White, Inc. company of Lynchburg, Virginia, were contracted to build the shop buildings. The building materials for the construction site arrived by train via the SOU mainline. The larger buildings were designed to be constructed quickly with steel frames being placed on substantial masonry. On August 19, less than five months later, the new shops were officially opened and named the Spencer Shops after the SOU president. The original buildings included a 15-stall roundhouse, a 65-foot turntable, a machine shop, a combination forge and boiler shop, a woodworking shop, a storehouse/office building, a power plant, and a car repair shop. Most shops had not yet adopted electricity for tools and machinery, so they were still powered by a system of shafts, pulleys, and belts.

In 1924, a 37-stall roundhouse and 100 foot-long electric turntable were opened that still stands. A coaling tower was erected in the 1920s to replace the coaling dock near the classification yard.

=== Transition to diesel power ===
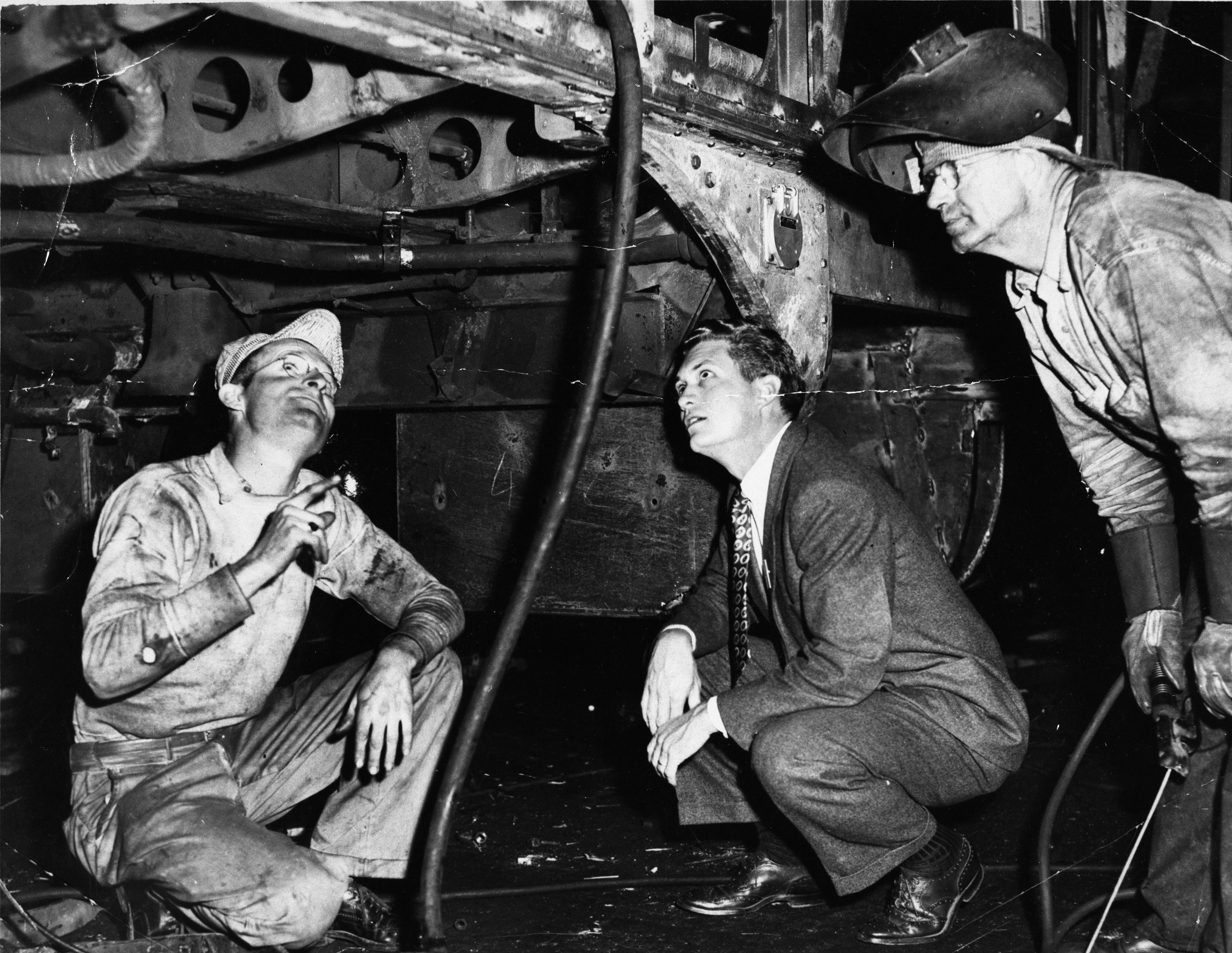
The workshop crew inspecting a diesel locomotive

Throughout the 1940s and early 1950s, Southern Railway used the Spencer Shops as its main repair facility for diesel locomotives on eastern lines operating in the Carolinas, Virginia, and Georgia. The shops ceased working on steam engines in 1953, when the railway company phased them out. In the mid-1950s the railway began terminating some jobs and moving workers to other facilities, and by 1960 only the roundhouse and repair shed were still in use by less than 100 workers. Most of the work was concentrated in more modern shops in Atlanta and Chattanooga. The unused buildings were not maintained and their physical condition rapidly declined. By 1965, the blacksmith shop, boiler shop, and woodworking shop had been demolished. The workforce decreased into the 1970s and was confined to conducting minor repairs and refueling for diesel locomotives operating out of Spencer Yard. In 1979 Southern Railway opened Linwood Terminal, a hump yard with repair facilities several miles north in Linwood, and Spencer Shops was closed.

=== Creation of museum and preservation ===
In 1977, the Southern Railway donated the back shop, master mechanic's office, a warehouse, and the flue shop buildings to the state of North Carolina to support the creation of the North Carolina Transportation Museum. The rest of the Spencer property, including the car repair shed and oil house, was handed over two years later after the shops were closed. The museum opened to the public in 1983.

== Works cited ==
- Cox, Jim (2010). Rails Across Dixie: A History of Passenger Trains in the American South. Jefferson: McFarland. ISBN 9780786461752.
- Galloway, Duane; Wrinn, Jim (1996). Southern Railway's Spencer Shops: 1896-1996. Lynchburg, Virginia: TLC Publishing Inc. ISBN 1-883089-23-9.
- Neal, Larry K. Jr. (2011). Southern Railway's Historic Spencer Shops. Arcadia Publishing. ISBN 9780738587806.
- Starr, Timothy (2024). The Back Shop Illustrated, Volume 3: Southeast and Western Regions. Privately printed.
