= D. William Brosnan =

American railroad businessman

Dennis William "Bill" Brosnan Jr. (April 14, 1903 – June 14, 1985) was a president of Southern Railway in the US, a railroad that later merged with Norfolk & Western Railway to form Norfolk Southern.

Born in 1903 in Albany, Georgia, Brosnan was the son of the town's fire chief. In 1923, he took a job as an engineer with the Georgia Department of Highways, before taking a job as an apprentice student engineer for the Southern Railway three years later, maintaining the right-of-way.

Between 1931 and 1952, Brosnan had several promotions, from apprentice student engineer to junior engineer, division superintendent, general manager of the Central Lines of the Southern Railway and then to vice president of operations.

During his time as chief engineer for the Western Lines of the Southern Railway, in 1945 and 1946, Brosnan oversaw an increased mechanization of track maintenance and construction on the Southern Railway, and during his time as general manager for the Central Lines, he oversaw the automation of freight car classification in yards and terminals. He succeeded Harry A. DeButts as president in 1962.

Brosnon was notable for his impact on the railroad industry, including his implementation of labor-saving mechanical improvements, his introduction of marketing to the rail industry, his fights against government regulation, as well as his "imperious" management style. He has been characterized as a "demanding leader" and "a prescient despot".

In 1964, Brosnan was selected as the first recipient of the Man of the Year award by Modern Railways magazine, an award now presented by Railway Age magazine as the Railroader of the Year.

Brosnan was succeeded as president by W. Graham Claytor, Jr. He remained on the board of directors of the Southern until 1983. Brosnan died in 1985.

Norfolk Southern's 14,400 acre nature preserve near Charleston, South Carolina, Brosnan Forest, is named after Brosnan. This tract of land was first acquired by the South Carolina Canal & Railroad Company in the 1830s as a timber tract for its wooden railroad ties and was subsequently passed to the South Carolina Railroad in 1843, the Southern Railway in 1899, and Norfolk Southern in 1990.

== See also ==
- List of railroad executives
- Morgret, Charles O. (1996). Brosnan: the railroads' messiah (1st ed.). New York: Vantage Press. ISBN 9780533113767.

Business positions
Preceded by Harry A. deButts	President of Southern Railway; 1962 – 1967	Succeeded by W. Graham Claytor Jr.
Awards
New title	Modern Railways magazine's Man of the Year; 1964	Succeeded by Stuart T. Saunders (PRR)
