= USRA Heavy Pacific =

American class of steam locomotives

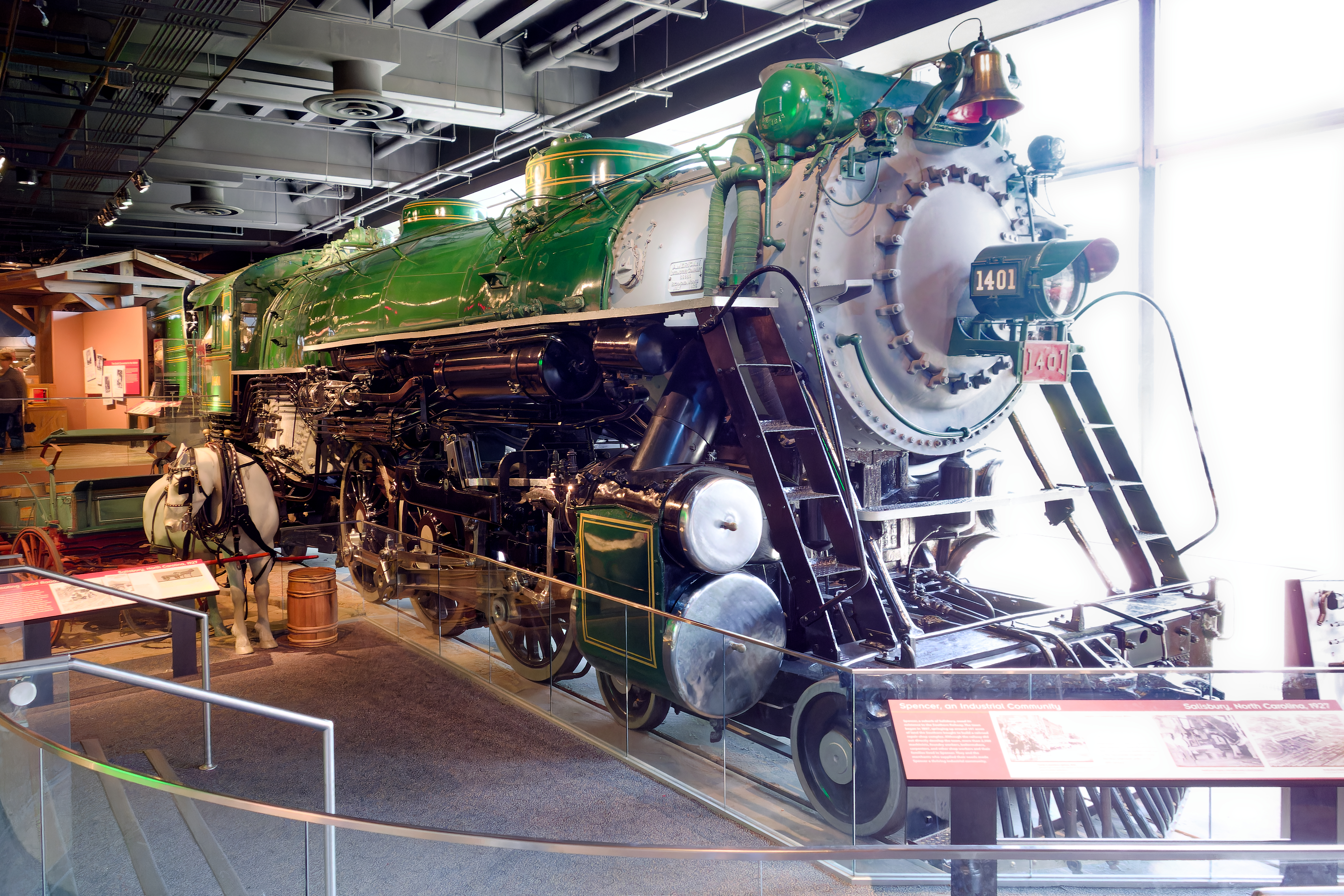
- Southern Railway 1401 on static display at the National Museum of American History
Type and origin
- Power type: Steam
- Builder: American Locomotive Company (10+59); Baldwin Locomotive Works (10+36); Lima Locomotive Works (0+2)
- Total produced: Originals: 20; Copies: 97
Specifications
- Configuration
  - Whyte: 4-6-2
  - UIC: 2′C1′ h2
- Gauge: 4 ft 8 1/2 in (1,435 mm)
- Driver dia.: 79 in (2,007 mm)
- Wheelbase: Coupled: 14 ft 0 in (4.27 m); Locomotive: 36 ft 2 in (11.02 m); Loco & tender: 70 ft 8 1/2 in (21.55 m)
- Axle load: 60,000 lb (27,000 kg)
- Adhesive weight: 180,000 lb (82,000 kg)
- Loco weight: 300,000 lb (140,000 kg)
- Tender weight: 144,000 lb (65,000 kg)
- Total weight: 444,000 lb (201,000 kg)
- Fuel capacity: Coal
- Water cap.: 8,000 US gal (30,000 L; 6,700 imp gal)
- Tender cap.: 32,000 lb (15,000 kg)
- Firebox
  - Grate area: 70.8 sq ft (6.58 m^{2})
- Boiler pressure: 200 psi (1.38 MPa)
- Heating surface
  - Firebox: 284 sq ft (26.4 m^{2})
  - Tubes: 2,407 sq ft (223.6 m^{2})
  - Flues: 1,090 sq ft (101 m^{2})
  - Total surface: 3,808 sq ft (353.8 m^{2})
- Superheater
  - Heating area: 882 sq ft (81.9 m^{2})
- Cylinders: Two, outside
- Cylinder size: 27 in × 28 in (686 mm × 711 mm)
- Valve gear: Baker
- Valve type: 14-inch (356 mm) piston valves
Performance figures
- Tractive effort: 43,800 lbf (194.83 kN)
- Factor of adh.: 4.1

The USRA Heavy Pacific is a USRA standard class of steam locomotive designed under the control of the United States Railroad Administration, the nationalized railroad system in the United States during World War I. This was the standard heavy passenger locomotive of the USRA types, and was 4-6-2 wheel arrangement in the Whyte notation, or 2′C1′ in UIC classification.

== Roster fleet ==
=== Original locomotives ===
A total of 20 locomotives were built under USRA control, with the production split between the Baldwin Locomotive Works and the American Locomotive Company's Richmond plant; these were sent to the following railroads:

Table of original USRA allocation
Railroad	Quantity	Class	Road numbers	Built	Notes	Retired
Erie Railroad	20	K-5	2915–2934	1919	Ten K-5-As were also built as copies (Nos. 2935-2944) in 1923 and a K-5-B (No. 2960) in 1926 by Baldwin.	1950-1952

=== Locomotive copies ===
Other post-USRA derivatives include the Baltimore and Ohio P-7 and the Southern Railway Ps-4 classes, the former having larger 80 inch drivers, higher tractive effort, and increased boiler pressure, and the latter with smaller 73 inch drivers, larger cabs, feedwater heaters, and later batches given larger tenders.

Table of USRA copies
Railroad	Quantity	Class	Road numbers	Built	Notes	Retired
Baltimore & Ohio (B&O)	20	P-7	5300-5319	1927	Built by Baldwin.	1958
Erie Railroad	10	K-5A	2935-2944	1923	Built by Baldwin. All upgraded with Boxpok driving wheels	1951-1952
Erie Railroad	1	K-5B	2960	1926	Built by Baldwin. Fitted with Uniflow cylinders, which was removed in August 1940.	1951
Southern Railway (SOU)	64	Ps-4	1366-1409, 6471-6482, 6675-6691	1923-1928	Thirty-six (Nos. 1366-1392, 6471-6475, and 6684-6687) built between 1923 and 1924 at ALCO's Schenectady Works.; Twenty-three (Nos. 1393-1404, 6476-6482, and 6688-6691) built in 1926 at ALCO's Richmond Works.; The last five (Nos. 1405-1409) built in 1928 by Baldwin.	1949-1953
West Point Route (WPR)	2	P-74	190 & 290	1926	Nos. 190 and 290 were both built for the Western Railway of Alabama (WRA) and the Atlanta and West Point Railroad (A&WP), respectively.	1954
Total	97					

== Preservation ==
Three copies have been preserved.

No.	Builder	Date built	Post-USRA owner	Location	Image	Disposition
290	Lima Locomotive Works	March 1926	Atlanta and West Point Railroad	Southeastern Railway Museum		In storage, awaiting cosmetic restoration
1401	American Locomotive Works	July 1926	Southern Railway	National Museum of American History		On static display
5300	Baldwin Locomotive Works	February 1927	Baltimore and Ohio Railroad	B&O Railroad Museum		Undergoing cosmetic restoration
