= Washington to Atlanta Main Line =

The Washington to Atlanta Main Line is a railroad line owned and operated by the Norfolk Southern Railway that runs through the southeastern United States.

It runs from a junction with CSX Transportation's RF&P Subdivision in Alexandria, Virginia southwesterly via Charlottesville, Virginia, Lynchburg, Virginia, Danville, Virginia, Greensboro, North Carolina, Charlotte, North Carolina, Spartanburg, South Carolina, and Greenville, South Carolina to Atlanta, Georgia. The portion from Greensboro to Charlotte is actually owned by the North Carolina Railroad, but NS has an exclusive trackage rights agreement to use the line.

The line was once the main line of the Southern Railway.

The line is also used by Amtrak's Crescent (New York-New Orleans), as well as the Carolinian (New York-Charlotte) and Piedmont (Raleigh-Charlotte).

== See also ==
- List of Norfolk Southern Railway lines
