= Harry A. DeButts =

American railroad executive (1895–1983)

Harry Ashby DeButts (October 13, 1895 – August 27, 1983) was a president of Southern Railway in the United States. He was succeeded by D. William Brosnan in 1962.

deButts graduated from the Virginia Military Institute in 1916 and joined Southern Railway that year. He served in the United States Marine Corps in World War I and then returned to Southern Railway, where he spent the remainder of his career. He became President of the company in 1952 and Chairman of Board on February 1, 1962, before retiring in November of that year. He died in Upperville, Virginia.

Norfolk Southern's DeButts Yard, located in Chattanooga, Tennessee, was named in his honor.

== See also ==
- List of railroad executives

Business positions
Preceded by Earnest E. Norris	President of Southern Railway; 1951 – 1962	Succeeded by D. William Brosnan
