= Running gear (rail transport) =

Locomotive component

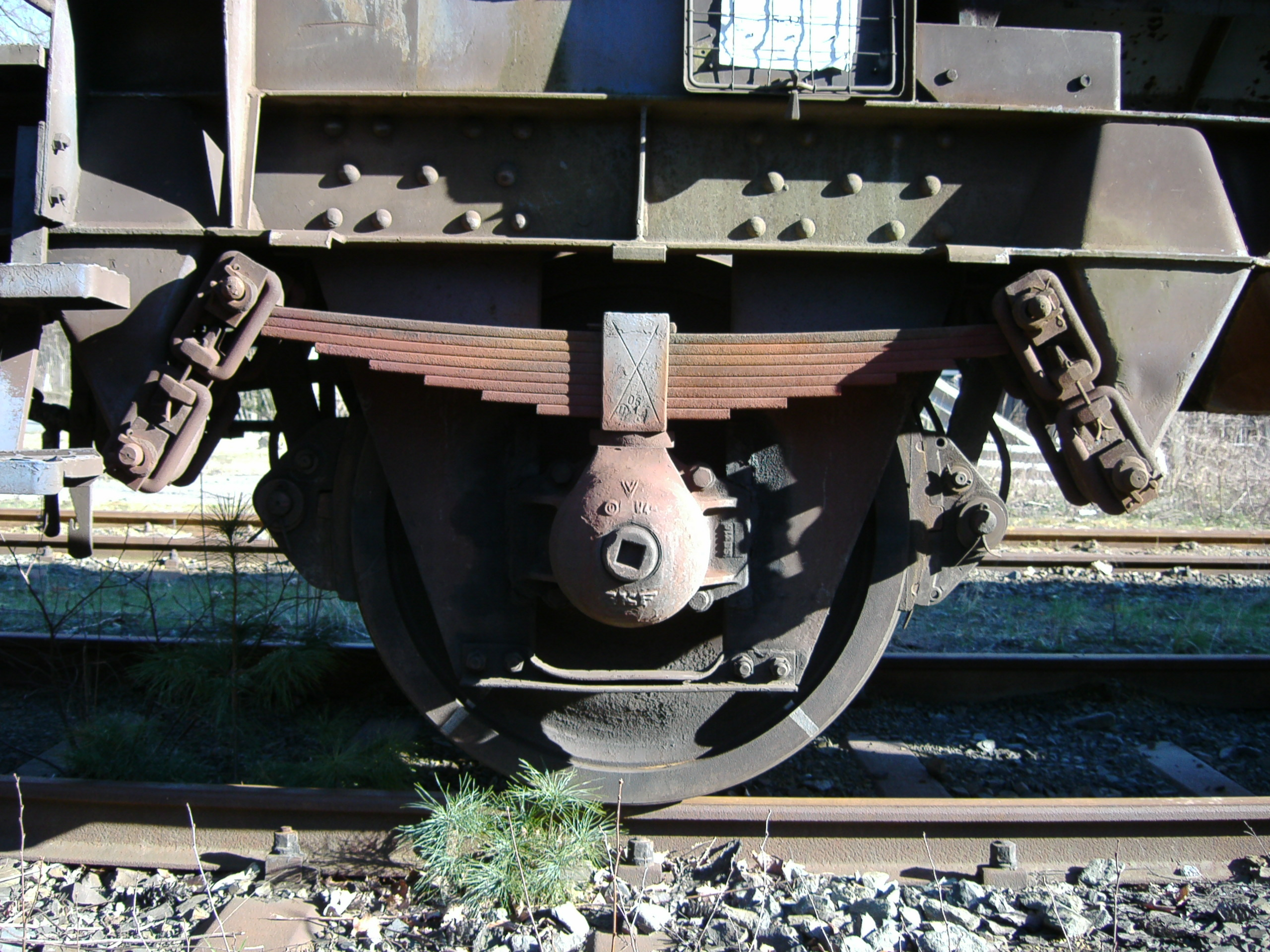
Single-axle running gear on a self-discharging hopper

In railway terminology the term running gear refers to those components of a railway vehicle that run passively on the rails, unlike those of the driving gear. Traditionally these are the wheels, axles, axle boxes, springs and vehicle frame of a railway locomotive or wagon. The running gear of a modern railway vehicle comprises, in most instances, a bogie frame with two wheelsets. However there are also wagons with single axles (fixed or movable) and even individual wheels. Since in modern times, locomotives no longer require separate driving and carrying axles (see wheel arrangement), as was formerly common with steam locomotives, but usually have bogies where all axles are driven, the term running gear is (inaccurately) superseding the term 'driving gear' in some parts of the world.

== See also ==
- Bogie
