= Crescent (Southern Railway train) =

Southern Railway passenger train

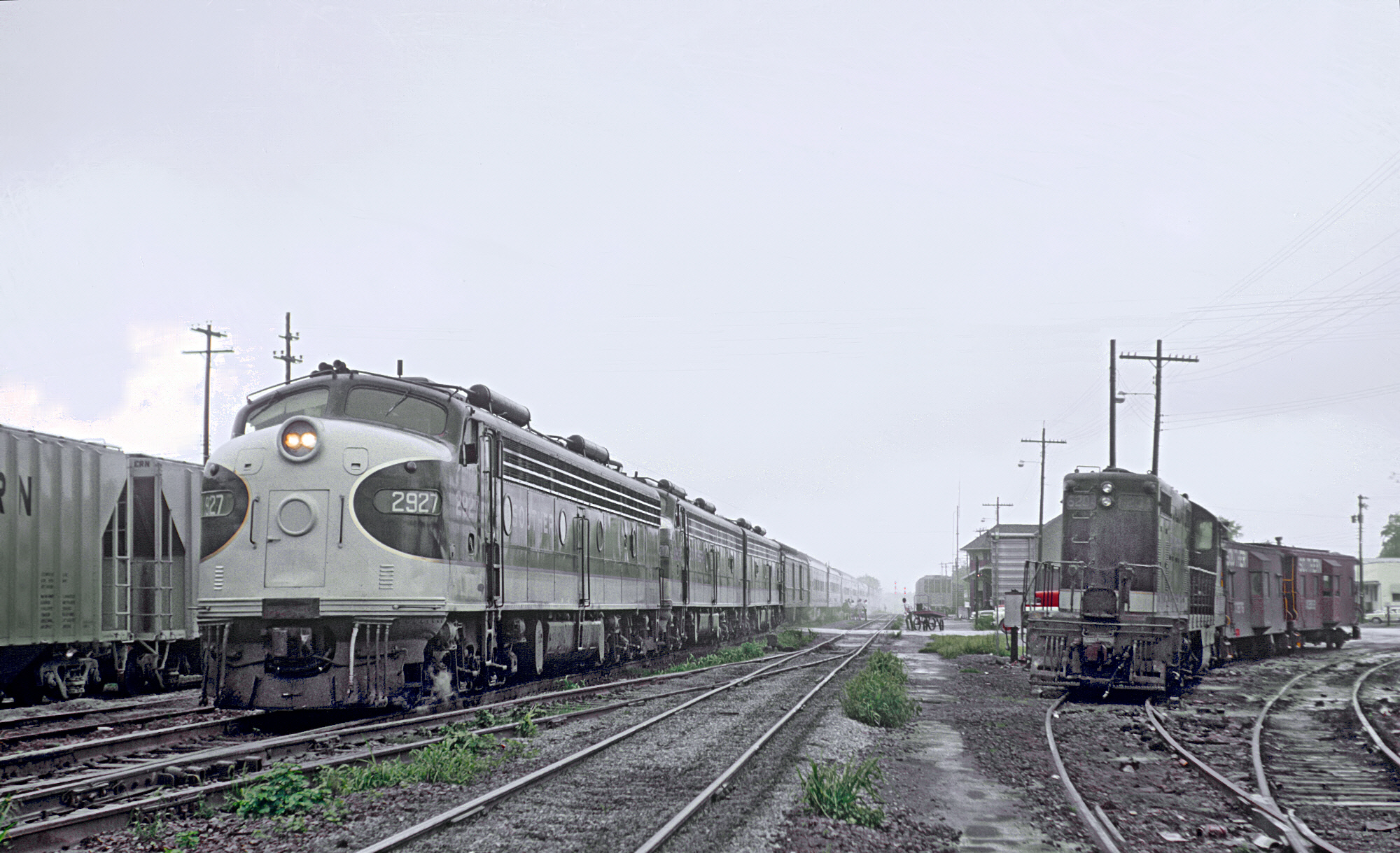
- The northbound Crescent at Gainesville in August 1967

Overview
- Service type: Inter-city rail
- Status: Discontinued
- Locale: Eastern United States
- First service: April 26, 1925
- Former operator: Southern Railway

Route
- Termini: New York City, New York; New Orleans, Louisiana
- Service frequency: Daily
- Train numbers: 37 (southbound); 38 (northbound)

Technical
- Track gauge: 4 ft 8 1/2 in (1,435 mm) standard gauge
- Track owners: Pennsylvania Railroad, Southern Railway, Atlanta and West Point Railroad, Western Railway of Alabama, Louisville and Nashville Railroad

The Crescent was an intercity passenger train operated by the Southern Railway between New York City and New Orleans.

== History ==
=== 19th century ===
In the 1870s, the Richmond and Danville Railroad (R&D)—the predecessor of the Southern Railway — established the "Piedmont Air Line Route", which connected the northeastern United States with Atlanta and New Orleans via Richmond and via Norfolk Southern's present route through Charlottesville and Lynchburg. The Southern Express and the Southern Mail operated over these routes on an advertised time of 57 hours and 40 minutes, including a change at Atlanta.

On January 4, 1891, the R&D launched the Washington & Southwestern Vestibuled Limited, the earliest direct ancestor of today's Crescent. It originally connected Washington, D.C., and Atlanta. According to an official history compiled by Southern Railway, it was promoted as "a service second to none in completeness and elegance of detail ... providing all the latest and best facilities for the comfort and enjoyment of its patrons." The South's first all-year train with vestibuled equipment, it was popularly known as simply the Vestibule. Among its amenities were "drawing-room and stateroom sleeping cars, dining cars, smoking and library cars, and observation cars." Many passengers passed the time simply walking between cars "just to enjoy the unusual experience of being able to do so without having their hats blown away."

Soon the Washington-to-Atlanta routing expanded via the West Point Route from Atlanta to Montgomery and the Louisville and Nashville Railroad from Montgomery to New Orleans, via Mobile. The route was then extended to New York (Jersey City before 1910) along the Pennsylvania Railroad's northeastern trunk line, now Northeast Corridor, via a connection in Washington with the Congressional Limited. Scheduled time for the New York-to-New Orleans run was advertised as a "40-hour, unprecedented" trip. Because of the popularity of this service, the Vestibule became a solid train of walk-through cars between New York and New Orleans. It also carried the first dining cars to operate between those two cities.

The new train's popularity was not enough to prevent the R&D from being forced into receivership in 1892. Two years later, the R&D merged with five other railroads to form the Southern Railway Company. Under Southern ownership, the train was initially called the Washington & Southwestern Limited southbound, and the New York Limited northbound.

=== 20th century ===
In 1906, the train was renamed the New York & New Orleans Limited in both directions, and equipped with "club cars" and observation cars. It was renamed the Crescent Limited with new equipment on April 26, 1925. On August 24, 1933, the southbound Crescent Limited derailed in Washington, D.C., on a bridge that had been damaged by the 1933 Chesapeake–Potomac hurricane the previous day. The name was simplified to Crescent by 1938, and it began using diesel locomotives in 1941.

While the Southerner and Tennessean were streamlined in 1941, the Crescent retained heavyweight equipment until early 1950. A New York–Los Angeles through sleeper using the Crescent and the Southern Pacific Railroad Sunset Limited was established in 1952.

As passenger demand dwindled, the Southern began combining trains to save operating costs. The northbound Crescent was combined with the Peach Queen, with through Atlanta-New York coaches. The southbound Crescent was combined with the Asheville Special and the Augusta Special, with through New York-Charlotte coaches. It also carried "deadhead" coaches to Atlanta for the return north on the Crescent. After November 1968, the Crescent was a coach-only train sustained by two storage mail cars. With the discontinuance of the Humming Bird on January 9, 1969, it was run combined with the Pan-American south of Montgomery, leaving Atlanta at 7:15 p.m. on the old Piedmont Limited schedule.
