= Locomotive change =

A locomotive or engine change is a location where a locomotive is exchanged for another locomotive.

== History ==
For as long as there have been railroads, locomotive changes have been essential to the officials of the railroads, so that a locomotive could be exchanged for the rest of the trip to the next locomotive changing facility or the destination of the train. Without these facilities, locomotives will suffer from wear and tear or in the era of the steam locomotive, the locomotive will also suffer a lack of fuel and water. Many of the original locations where steam was exchanged for another steam locomotive for the remainder of the trip have been closed since diesel locomotives replaced steam locomotives on the point of both freight and passenger trains.

In some cases, an electric locomotive would be replaced by a steam or diesel locomotive for the remainder of the trip. For example, the Pennsylvania Railroad, New York Central Railroad and the New York, New Haven and Hartford Railroad had locations where electric locomotives were exchanged for steam or diesel locomotives.

== Notable locations ==
There are many locations where locomotives were exchanged for another locomotive. Some are still in use today, while others are gone.

=== United States ===
South Amboy, New Jersey

Before electrification to Long Branch, New Jersey in the 80s, diesels for the Pennsylvania Railroad (steam as well), Penn Central, Conrail and New Jersey Transit were exchanged for electrics, for the trip to Penn Station in New York City.

Bellefontaine, Ohio

The New York Central exchanged locomotives on all trains where two main lines crossed each other. Manhattan Transfer (PRR) station: Where Pennsylvania Railroad DD1 third rail electrics were exchanged or replaced steam locomotives on trains.

Enola Yard

A Pennsylvania Railroad yard where prior to the 1980s, Conrail, Penn Central and Pennsylvania Railroad electric locomotives replaced or cut off to allow diesel or steam locomotives to take over. There are many more locations where locomotives were exchanged for another.

=== United Kingdom ===
Birmingham New Street railway station

Up until the end of the 20th century, some passenger trains would have their haulage swapped here between diesel and electric locomotives.

Crewe railway station

Up until 1974, when the West Coast Main Line north of Crewe was electrified, expresses between Glasgow and London Euston swapped haulage between electric locomotives and class Class 50 diesel locomotives.

Wolverhampton railway station

In the 1980s, services between Shrewsbury and London Euston would switch haulage here; from Shrewsbury it would be diesel to electric, and vice versa for services to Shrewsbury.

== Today ==
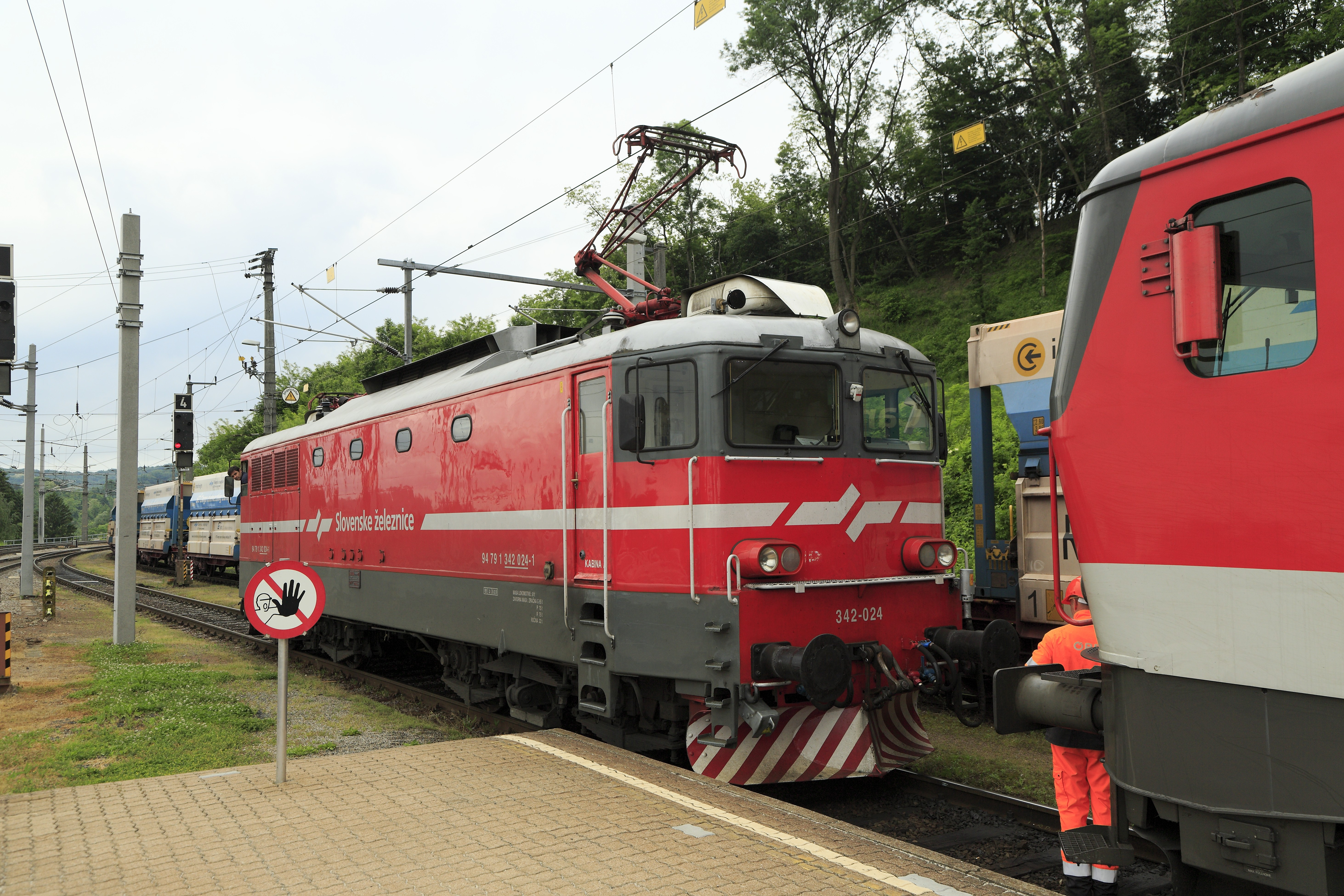
A locomotive change in Spielfeld-Straß, Austria, close to the Slovenian border. A Slovenian locomotive is preparing to remove the Austrian loco.

Today, locomotive changes are still used, although not as much as in yesteryear. But, there are still locations such as at Harrisburg Transportation Center where Amtrak electrics are replaced by diesels. Other very busy stations where such changes take place include Philadelphia's 30th Street Station, Washington, D.C.'s Union Station, New Haven's Union Station, and Albany-Rensselaer (In the past, locomotives were changed at Croton-Harmon, but today it is only the end of electrification, much of which Amtrak does not use.).
