= Alaska Railroad 557 =

Preserved 2-8-0 steam locomotive

Type and origin
- Power type: Steam
- Designer: Major J. W. Marsh
- Builder: Baldwin Locomotive Works
- Serial number: 70480
- Build date: 1944
Specifications
- Configuration
  - Whyte: 2-8-0
  - UIC: 1′D h2
- Gauge: 4 ft 8 1/2 in (1,435 mm)
- Leading dia.: 2 ft 9 in (838 mm)
- Driver dia.: 4 ft 9 in (1,448 mm)
- Wheelbase: 51 ft 7 3/4 in (15.74 m)
- Adhesive weight: 140,000 lb (63,503 kg)
- Loco weight: 161,000 lb (73,028 kg)
- Fuel type: New: Coal; Now: Oil
- Fuel capacity: 1,800 US gal (6,800 L; 1,500 imp gal) of oil, formerly 10 t (9.8 long tons; 11 short tons) of coal
- Water cap.: 6,500 US gal (25,000 L; 5,400 imp gal)
- Firebox
  - Grate area: 41 sq ft (3.8 m^{2})
- Boiler: 5 ft 10 in (1.78 m) maximum diameter
- Boiler pressure: 225 psi (1.55 MPa)
- Heating surface
  - Firebox: 136 sq ft (12.6 m^{2})
  - Tubes: 1,055 sq ft (98.0 m^{2}) (150 in or 3,810 mm long × 2 in or 51 mm diameter)
  - Flues: 567 sq ft (52.7 m^{2}) (30 in or 762 mm long × 5.375 in or 137 mm diameter)
  - Total surface: 2,253 sq ft (209.3 m^{2})
- Superheater
  - Type: Type A
  - Heating area: 313 sq ft (29.1 m^{2})
- Cylinders: Two, outside
- Cylinder size: 19 in × 26 in (482.6 mm × 660.4 mm) bore x stroke
- Valve gear: Walschaerts
- Valve type: 10 inches (254 mm) piston valves
- Loco brake: Air
- Train brakes: Air
- Couplers: Knuckle
Performance figures
- Maximum speed: 45 mph (72 km/h)
- Tractive effort: 31,500 lbf (140.1 kN)
- Factor of adh.: 4.45
Career
- Operators: U.S. Army; Alaska Railroad
- Class: S160
- Numbers: USATC 3523; ARR 557
- Retired: September 5, 1960
- Current owner: Alaska Railroad
- Disposition: Undergoing restoration to operating condition

Alaska Railroad 557 is an S160 class 2-8-0 "Consolidation" type steam locomotive, built in 1944 by the Baldwin Locomotive Works (BLW) for the Transportation Corps during World War II. It was subsequently transferred to the Alaska Railroad (ARR) to haul freight trains, maintenance trains, and occasional passenger trains throughout Alaska. It was the last steam locomotive to be removed from service on the railroad before it was sold to a scrap dealer in Everett, Washington and then to Monte Holm, who operated it a few times and displayed it in his House of Poverty Museum. No. 557 returned to Alaska in January 2012, and as of early-2025, it is nearing completion of a rebuild to operate on the Alaska Railroad.

== History ==
=== Revenue service ===
No. 557 was constructed in 1944 by the Baldwin Locomotive Works in Philadelphia, Pennsylvania originally as Transportation Corps No. 3523. It was one of over 2,120 S160 class 2-8-0s constructed for the Transportation Corps to be shipped to Europe or Africa during the Second World War. Between 1943 and 1946 twelve S160s were placed in service on the Alaska Railroad to operate in Alaska. Under Alaska Railroad ownership, the locomotive was renumbered to 557 and modified for use on the Railroad's mainline and to withstand the frozen weather; large compound air compressors were mounted on the pilot deck, and steam generators and coils were installed to provide heat inside the cab for the crews. The locomotive would also occasionally be equipped with a snowplow to clear the trackage of snow during the winter months.

The Alaska Railroad initially assigned No. 557 as a Maintenance-of-Way (MOW) locomotive, hauling work trains to repair rails and track beds throughout the railroad's system. It was also occasionally used to pull short-distance passenger trains out of Anchorage. By the end of 1954, the Alaska Railroad had retired all of their coal-fired steam locomotives, with the exception of No. 557, which was converted from burning coal to burning oil. The locomotive was kept in the Alaska Railroad’s roster, primarily so it would be reassigned to pull trains and switch rolling stock throughout Nenana while resisting the high-water conditions in the town. The Tanana and Nenana Rivers regularly flooded the town and the rail yard, and the traction motors of the railroad’s diesel locomotives of the time were not water-resistant.

After the railroad acquired diesel locomotives with water-proof traction motors, No. 557 was put into storage on August 31, 1957 inside the Whittier engine house. Less than two years later, the locomotive was cleaned and repaired to be used to pull occasional fan trips for special events, such as a National Railway Historical Society (NRHS) excursion runs between Whittier and Anchorage, and the annual state fair trains in Palmer. No. 557’s last run occurred on September 5, 1960, and it became the last steam locomotive to be removed from the Alaska Railroad's active roster.

=== Preservation ===
In 1964, the No. 557 locomotive was sold to Monte Holm, a scrap dealer who owned the Michaelson Steel and Supply Company in Everett, Washington. On June 14, 1965, the locomotive was loaded onto the Train Ship Alaska barge, and it was shipped and unloaded in Seattle, and from there, it was towed to Everett. Holm withheld No. 557 for preservation, and he moved it to his newly-founded House of Poverty Museum in Moses Lake, Washington for static display purposes. The locomotive was parked on a 210-foot private rail line owned by Holm while being paired with a tender from a Copper River & Northwestern locomotive, and it spent more than four decades on static display while several people witnessed it during the museum tours. On May 4, 2006, Holm had died at the age of 89, and his grandsons, Steven and Larry Rimple, subsequently assumed ownership of his museum relics, including No. 557, and they slowly began selling them off.

In 2011, Jim and Vic Jansen acquired No. 557 from the Holm estate with the hopes of returning the locomotive to Alaska. The Jansens are the owners of several Alaska-based transportation companies, and they donated the locomotive to the Alaska Railroad. The railroad’s Vice President, Steve Silverstein, who had become aware of No. 557’s significance since 2001, ordered that No. 557 be moved and rehabilitated in Anchorage and be rebuilt for operational purposes. In December of that year, the locomotive was removed from display, loaded onto a flatcar, and towed to a harbor in Seattle, where it was loaded into a rail barge to be shipped to Whittier. Upon arrival in Whittier on January 3, 2012, No. 557 was towed by two EMD GP40s toward Anchorage before being unloaded from the flatcar, touching Alaska soil for the first time since 1965. Initially, the locomotive was believed to be in good mechanical condition. (Later it was found to have severe wear and in need of a major overhaul.) It was stored inside the Anchorage diesel facility until August of that year, when No. 557 was hauled by truck to an engine house in Wasilla, where restoration work would commence.

The Alaska Railroad formed a non-profit organization called the Engine 557 Restoration Company, which would be dedicated to rebuilding the locomotive with volunteer labor while raising funds. The cost to rebuild No. 557 was initially estimated to reach $600,000-$700,000. (Subsequent inspection revealed that this cost was significantly underestimated). As of 2024, restoration work on No. 557 is still underway; boiler work has been completed and a formal hydrostatic test has been performed under the oversight of a Federal Railroad Administration inspector, a U.S. Army tender was acquired from the nearby Museum of Alaska Transportation for use behind No. 557 and has been fully restored, the frame and running gear have been reworked, and the cab has been refurbished with the overhaul of all gauges and controls. A 2024 article by Railfan & Railroad announced the restoration to be in the "home-stretch" with a few key items such as a hydrostatic test and the installation of positive train control as some of the final restoration goals. The Engine 557 Restoration Company acquired the locomotive in August, 2012 from the Alaska Railroad Corporation for "One Dollar ($1.00) and other good and valuable considerations." The restoration company is responsible for the overhaul and will be in charge of operating and maintaining the locomotive, once it returns to service.

On November 8, 2025, No. 557 was fired up for the first time in 50 years, successfully passing a "burner test" in which the boiler was brought to operational pressure, burner and fuel systems were tested, safety valves were set, and air pump, turbo-generator, and whistle were all successfully functional checked. Final remaining assembly work of the locomotive is now underway.

== See also ==
- Great Smoky Mountains Railroad 1702
- McCloud Railway 25
- Tennessee Valley Railroad 610
