= Southern Railway 630 =

Preserved American 2-8-0 locomotive (SOU Ks-1 class)

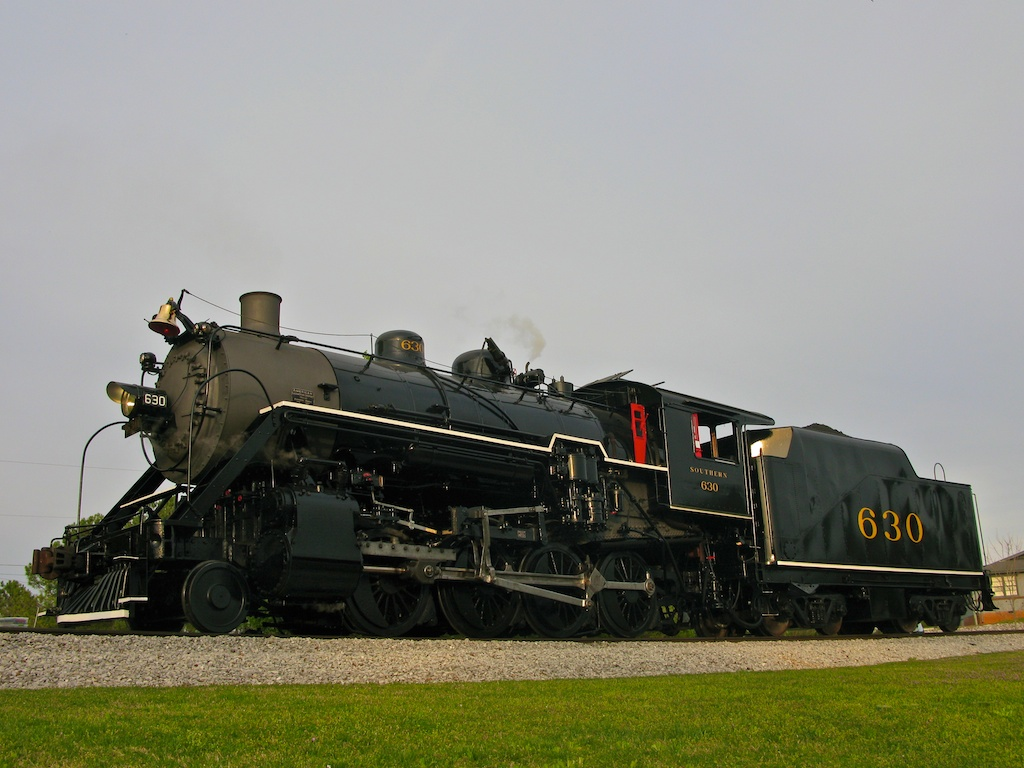
- Southern Railway No. 630 on TVRM's wye in April 2011.
Type and origin
- Power type: Steam
- Builder: American Locomotive Company (Richmond Works)
- Serial number: 28446
- Build date: February 1904
- Rebuilder: Southern Railway
- Rebuild date: 1917
Specifications
- Configuration
  - Whyte: 2-8-0
- Gauge: 4 ft 8 1/2 in (1,435 mm)
- Driver dia.: 56 in (1.422 m)
- Adhesive weight: 192,000 lb (87,000 kg)
- Loco weight: 214,000 lb (97,000 kg)
- Fuel type: Coal
- Fuel capacity: 16 t (16 long tons; 18 short tons), formerly 12 t (12 long tons; 13 short tons), 12.5 t (12.3 long tons; 13.8 short tons), and 14 t (14 long tons; 15 short tons)
- Water cap.: First tender: 6,000 US gal (23,000 L; 5,000 imp gal); Second tender: 7,500 US gal (28,000 L; 6,200 imp gal); Current tender: 10,000 US gal (38,000 L; 8,300 imp gal)
- Boiler pressure: 190 psi (1.31 MPa), formerly 200 psi (1.38 MPa)
- Cylinders: Two, outside
- Cylinder size: 24 in × 30 in (610 mm × 762 mm) bore x stroke
- Valve gear: New: Stephenson; Now: Southern
- Valve type: Piston valves
- Loco brake: Air
- Train brakes: Air
- Couplers: Knuckle
Performance figures
- Tractive effort: 46,700 lbf (207.73 kN), formerly 44,100 lbf (196.17 kN)
- Factor of adh.: 4.11
Career
- Operators: Southern Railway; East Tennessee and Western North Carolina Railroad; Tennessee Valley Railroad Museum
- Class: Ks-1
- Numbers: SOU 630; ET&WNC 207
- Retired: June 6, 1952 (1st revenue service); December 8, 1967 (2nd revenue service); November 1989 (1st excursion service)
- Restored: November 1952 (1st revenue service); February 1968 (1st excursion service); March 18, 2011 (2nd excursion service)
- Current owner: Tennessee Valley Railroad Museum
- Disposition: Undergoing 1,472-day inspection and overhaul
- Tennessee Valley Railroad Museum Rolling Stock
- U.S. National Register of Historic Places
- Location within Tennessee Location within the United States
- Location: 2202 N. Chamberlain Ave., Chattanooga, Tennessee
- Coordinates: 35°03′43″N 85°15′01″W
- Built: 1904
- Built by: American Locomotive Company
- NRHP reference No.: 80003824
- Added to NRHP: August 6, 1980

Southern Railway 630 is a 2-8-0 "Consolidation" type steam locomotive, built in February 1904 by American Locomotive Company's (ALCO) Richmond Works of Richmond, Virginia for the Southern Railway (SOU) as a member of the K class, but would later be re-classified as a Ks-1 type when receiving modifications such as superheaters and larger cylinders during 1917. It was primarily assigned to haul freight trains on SOU's Murphy and Lake Toxaway Branches until being retired in 1952. That same year, No. 630 and fellow Ks-1 locomotive No. 722, were sold to the East Tennessee and Western North Carolina Railroad (ET&WNC) to be served as switchers around Johnson City and Elizabethton, Tennessee.

In 1967, Nos. 630 and 722 were both sold back to the SOU to haul mainline excursion trains for the steam program until being replaced by larger steam locomotives in the early 1980s. No. 630 was leased by the Tennessee Valley Railroad Museum (TVRM) in Chattanooga, Tennessee until it was pulled from service in 1989. Additionally, the locomotive and other pieces of the museum's rolling stock was added to the NRHP under the Tennessee Valley Railroad Museum Rolling Stock listing.

Being donated to TVRM by SOU's successor Norfolk Southern (NS) since the late 1990s, No. 630 was restored back to operating condition in 2011, pulling mainline excursions in Alabama, Georgia, Kentucky, North Carolina, Ohio, Tennessee, Virginia, and West Virginia for NS' 21st Century Steam program until 2014. It continues to haul excursion trains such as the Missionary Ridge Local and the Summerville Steam Special for TVRM until late 2025.

== History ==
=== Upgrades and revenue service ===
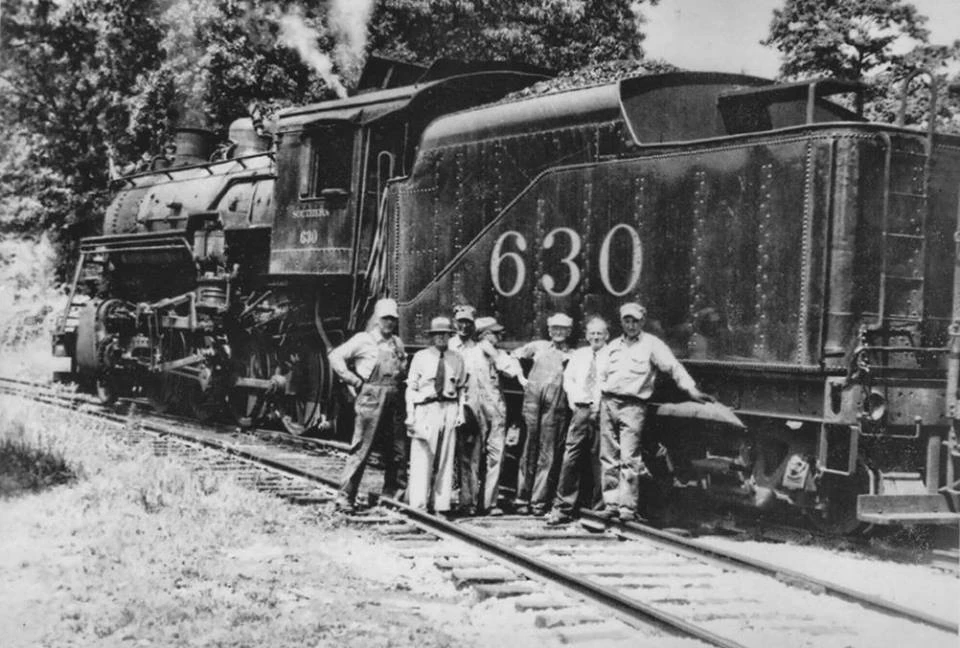
No. 630 in Brevard, North Carolina on the Lake Toxaway Branch, June 6, 1952.

Built in February 1904 by American Locomotive Company's (ALCO) Richmond Works as one of 32 K class locomotives (Nos. 605-636) for the Southern Railway (SOU) between October 1903 and November 1904, No. 630 was standardized with 56 in (1.422 m) driving wheels and a boiler pressure of 200 psi (1.38 MPa), making the locomotive produce 44,100 lbf (196.17 kN) of tractive effort. It was originally built with Stephenson valve gear, slide valves, 22 in × 30 in (559 mm × 762 mm) cylinders, double-guide alligator crossheads, and a saturated boiler. No. 630 was also delivered with a smaller tender carrying 12.5 tonnes (28,000 lb) of coal and 6,000 US gallons (23,000 L) of water.

No. 630 was first assigned to local and branch line service in SOU's Knoxville Division. Sometime during 1907, No. 630 swapped out its original tender with a slightly larger one, which holds 12 tonnes (26,000 lb) of coal and 7,500 US gallons (28,000 L) of water. In 1917, it was upgraded with Southern valve gear, superheaters, and larger 24 in × 30 in (610 mm × 762 mm) piston valve cylinders with the boiler pressure dropped to 190 psi (1.31 MPa) to prevent it from wheel slipping with these new cylinders. Reclassified as a Ks-1 type, the locomotive develop 46,700 lbf (207.73 kN) of tractive effort. (Note: Other Ks locomotives were re-equipped with slightly larger 25 in × 30 in (635 mm × 762 mm) cylinders and had their boiler pressure dropped to 175 psi (1.21 MPa), which reclassified them as Ks-2s.) Also around that time, the locomotive was moved to the Asheville Division to run freight trains on the Murphy and Lake Toxaway Branches. Frequently, the locomotive ran on the Lake Toxaway Branch between Hendersonville and Lake Toxaway.

In the 1930s, No. 630's second tender was upgraded with coal boards, increasing the fuel capacity to 14 tonnes (31,000 lb). During World War II in the 1940s, No. 630 was upgraded with single-guide multiple-bearing crossheads for greater surface area to slide back and forth when the locomotive was in motion. Additionally, this was made to receive less fouling from cinders and debris unlike the alligator type, which was prone to do that. The tender was also upgraded again with the coal boards superseded by slightly faired sheet metal extensions, doubling the height of the bunker collar. This would also extended the fuel capacity to 16 tonnes (35,000 lb).

On June 6, 1952, the locomotive was officially retired from revenue service after being the last steamer to run on the Lake Toxaway Branch. It was taken over by SOU's new fleet of EMD GP7s. In November that year, No. 630 and fellow Ks-1 locomotive No. 722 were both sold to the East Tennessee and Western North Carolina Railroad (ET&WNC), where they were served as switchers around Johnson City and Elizabethton, Tennessee. (Note: The ET&WNC superintendent Clarence Hobbs originally wanted to buy Ks-1 No. 685 (Baldwin, 1904) and Ks-2 No. 835 (Baldwin, 1906), which were found to be stored outside in poor condition, and the SOU Asheville Master Mechanic offered Nos. 630 and 722.) After acquisition by the ET&WNC, Nos. 630 and 722 were renumbered to 207 and 208, respectively and had their tender bunker collars removed to give the engineer a clear view during numerous switching moves and reverse operation.

=== SOU excursion service ===
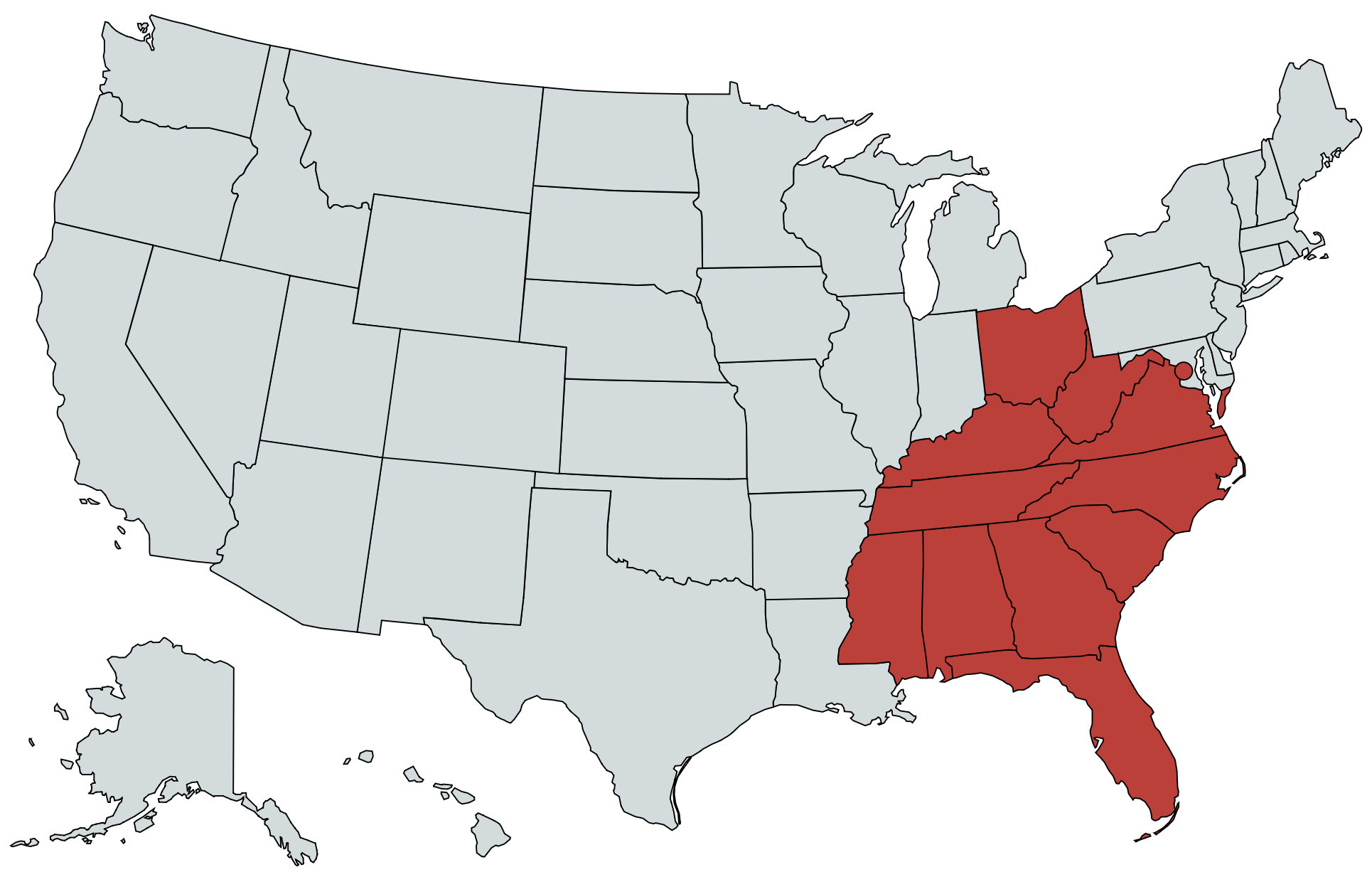
The US states visited by No. 630 in excursion service.

In September 1960, No. 207 pulled a Silver Anniversary excursion train on the Clinchfield mainline between Johnson City and Kingsport, Tennessee, as part of that year's National Railway Historical Society (NRHS) Convention. On June 17, 1967, Robert B. Claytor arranged No. 207 to visit Roanoke, Virginia to celebrate the grand opening of the Roanoke Transportation Museum in the Wasena Park. There, it gave guests free shuttle train rides between the Roanoke passenger station and Wasena Park via the former Norfolk and Western (N&W) Roanoke Belt Line. On December 8 that year, Nos. 207 and 208 were both traded back to the SOU for use in their steam excursion program in return for a pair of former Central of Georgia (COG) ALCO RS-3s. No. 207, renumbered back to 630, was deemed in good condition and had been given minor repairs. The locomotive's tender was also modified again with the bunker collars restored.

No. 630 began its main line excursion career for the SOU on February 24-25, 1968, pulling an excursion from Birmingham to Albany, Alabama, via Attalla, Alabama to commemorate the 75th anniversary of the shortline Georgia Northern Railway that the SOU acquired two years prior. For the remainder of the 1968 season, No. 630 was the primary locomotive for the SOU steam program, filling in for Ms class 2-8-2 Light Mikado No. 4501, which was under overhaul at the time. It pulled round-trip excursions out of Charleston, South Carolina to Branchville on May 18 and Aiken on June 16. It then went to Dothan, Alabama to haul round-trip excursions between there and Panama City, Florida, via the Atlanta and St. Andrews Bay Railroad (ASAB) on June 29-30. On July 6, No. 630 went to Atlanta, Georgia to hauled a loop trip Georgia Peach Special excursion via McDonough; Griffin; Fort Valley; and Macon, Georgia.

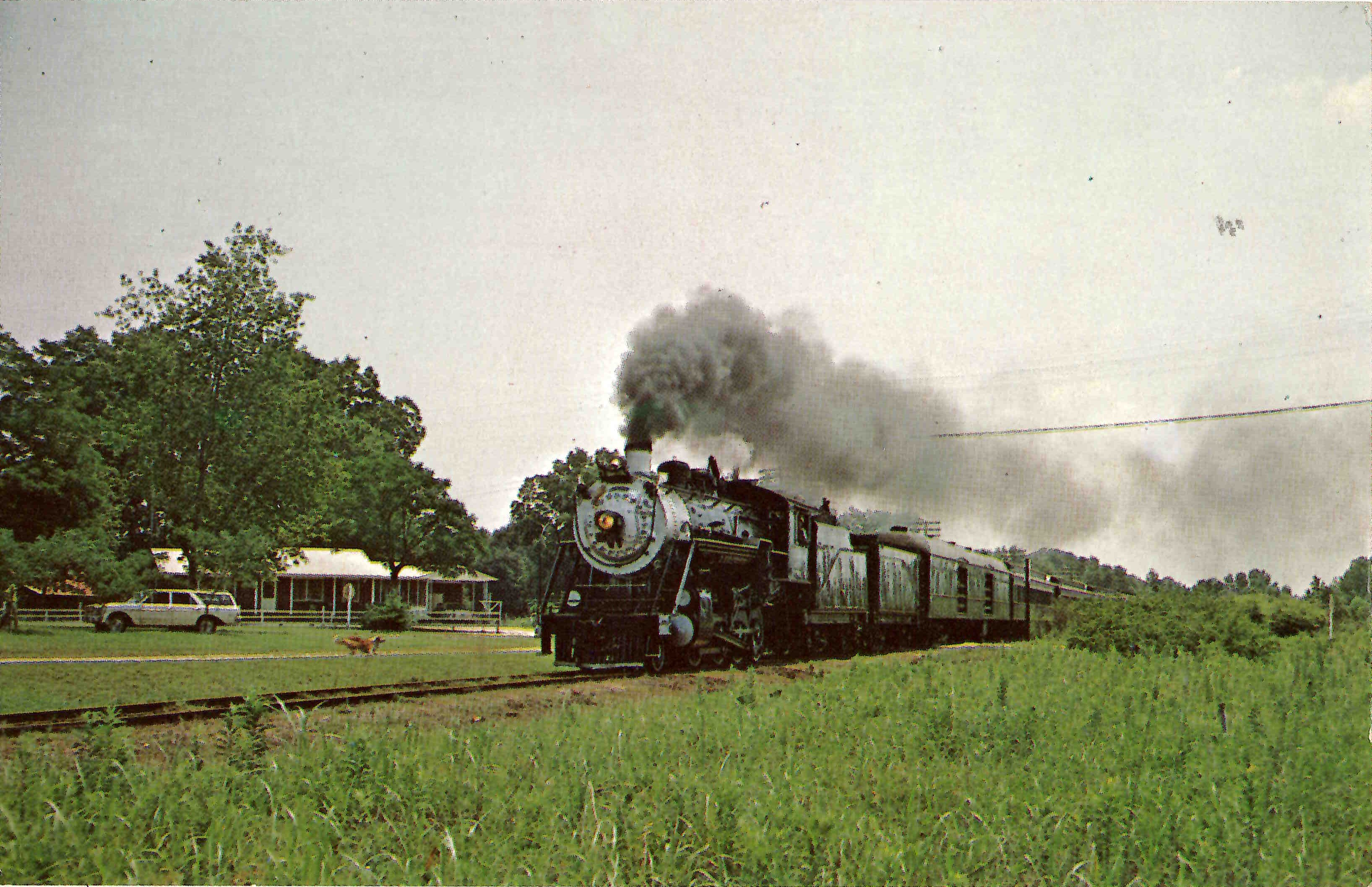
No. 630 approaching Branchville, South Carolina with an excursion from Charleston, South Carolina, May 18, 1968.

On July 5, 1969, No. 630 double headed with ex-Savannah and Atlanta (S&A) 4-6-2 Light Pacific No. 750 on another loop trip Georgia Peach Special excursion between Atlanta and Fort Valley. On July 12 that year, No. 630 pulled a round-trip Georgia Steam Cannonball excursion via Georgia Railroad (GA) trackage from Decatur to Augusta, Georgia, where it was uncoupled from the train and a GA diesel locomotive took over for the return trip. The next day, No. 630 made the ferry move to Charleston, South Carolina, where it was based there to pull round-trip excursions between there and Branchville on August 23, September 27, and November 15. In September 1970, No. 630 was reunited with No. 208, which was restored with its original 722 number and a new SOU Sylvan green livery to match No. 4501. All three locomotives participated in the Charleston Chapter of the National Railway Historical Society convention in Charleston. (Note: Also participating in the event was SOU's replica of the Best Friend of Charleston and the Charleston Chapter's ex-Hampton and Branchville 4-6-0 No. 44.) Unlike the other two locomotives, No. 630 retained its black paint livery.

During 1971, Nos. 630 and 4501 went to SOU's Norris Yard Steam Shop in Irondale, Alabama for major repairs, while Nos. 722 and 750 handled most of the excursions for the season. No. 4501 returned to service in April 1972, while No. 630 followed in October 1975. On November 11 that year, Nos. 630 and 4501 traveled to Hattiesburg, Mississippi, where they were both filmed for the 1977 CBS television film Minstrel Man before returning to Birmingham on November 19. During the United States Bicentennial celebration in 1976, both locomotives went to Alexandria, Virginia to haul round-trip excursions from there to Calverton; Charlottesville; Front Royal; and Warrenton, Virginia from late May to July. Afterwards, No. 4501 went off to pull other excursions outside Alexandria, while No. 630 remained in Alexandria until April 1977.

=== Lease and eventual ownership transfer with TVRM ===
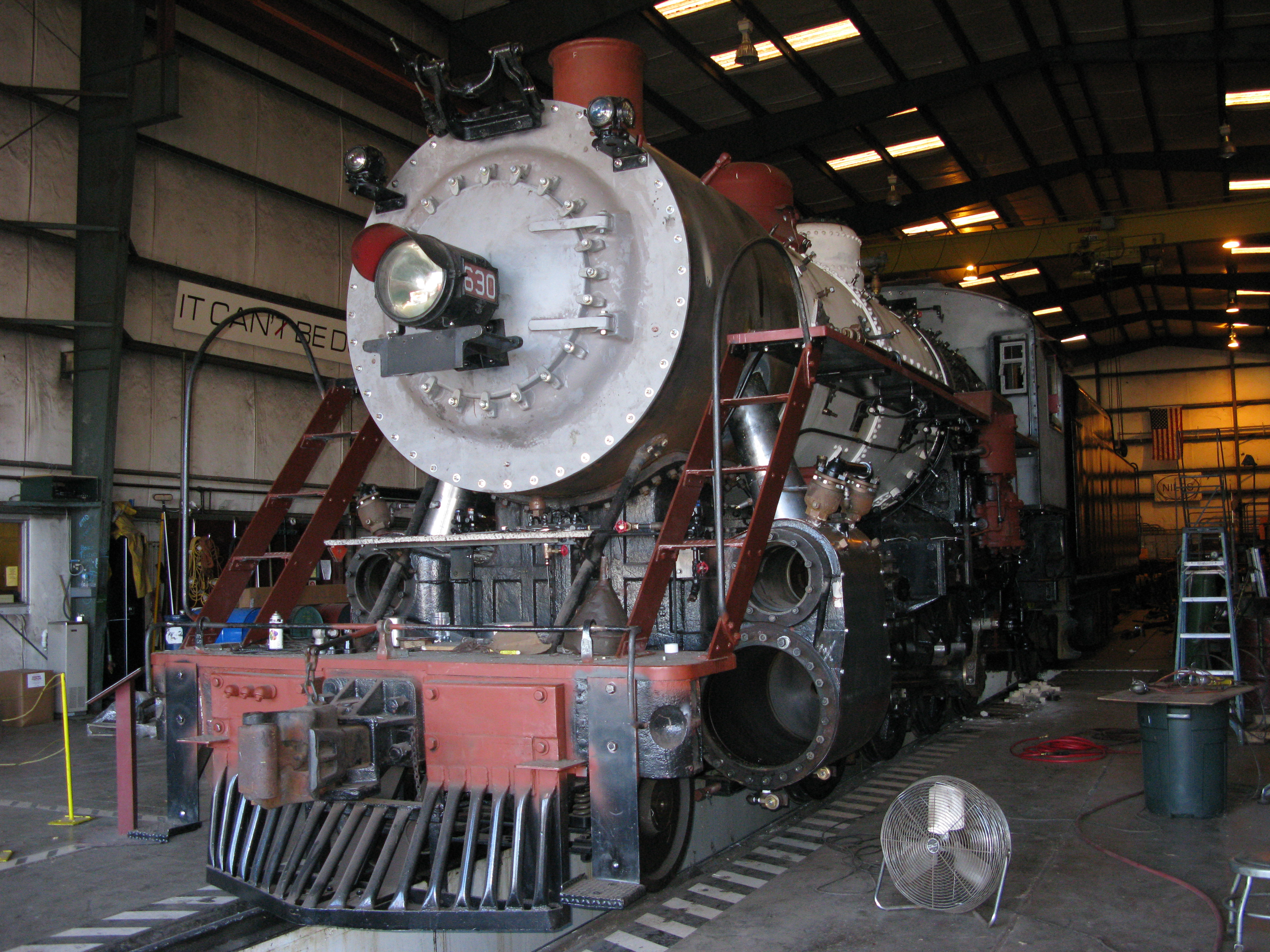
No. 630's restoration nearing completion at TVRM's Soule Shops, November 2010.

In November 1978, No. 630 was retired from the steam program and leased to the Tennessee Valley Railroad Museum (TVRM) in Chattanooga, Tennessee, since the SOU excursion consists had become longer and heavier, and the railway leased larger locomotives Texas and Pacific (T&P) 2-10-4 No. 610 and Canadian Pacific (CP) 4-6-4 No. 2839 to haul them. Both Nos. 630 and 722 could only manage to pull just 10 cars at 40 mph (64 km/h).

In March 1979, No. 630 begin to pull excursions for TVRM, running 3 miles (4.8 km) from their East Chattanooga Yard, through the pre-Civil War Whiteside Tunnel, before finally reaching the end of the former East Tennessee, Virginia and Georgia Railway (ETV&G) right of way at Cromwell Road, where the annual Tunnel Station Festival occurred. On March 20, 1980, the locomotive given the duty to break through the ceremonial red ribbon at the grand opening of TVRM's new East Chattanooga Depot in the East Chattanooga Yard.

In 1981, No. 630 along with TVRM's ex-U.S. Army ALCO RSD-1 diesel No. 8669 were volunteered to switch freight cars on TVRM's property when the museum was constructing the Jersey wye and the new Grand Junction Station on site of TVRM's end of right of way. The new wye was completed in March 1982 with Nos. 630 and 8669 being tested there at TVRM's still under construction Grand Junction Station, including the new turntable at the East Chattanooga Yard, which was activated on July 4 that year. The new station building was completed around 1983.

In 1984, No. 630 was reunited with No. 722, which was also retired from the SOU steam program, to haul the new Missionary Ridge Local excursions. In late October that year, they double-headed together on the Missionary Ridge Local primarily for the mainline excursion passengers to see them when their train hauled by ex-Norfolk and Western (N&W) 4-8-4 No. 611 passes TVRM's Grand Junction Station while enroute from Atlanta to Chattanooga. In November 1985, No. 722 was taken out of service when its boiler flue time expired, and it was later moved in 1992 to Asheville, North Carolina, for display.

On August 30, 1987, No. 630 was used for testing to pull the Downtown Arrow excursion, which ran between Grand Junction Station and the Chattanooga Choo-Choo Hotel in downtown Chattanooga. On November 1 that year, No. 630 lead the Downtown Arrow excursion's inaugural run, and it briefly met ex-N&W 2-6-6-4 No. 1218, which was pulling a mainline excursion into Chattanooga from Atlanta that same day. In November 1989, No. 630 was taken out of service and put on display while TVRM was restoring another 2-8-0 steam locomotive, ex-U.S. Army No. 610.

With SOU's successor Norfolk Southern (NS) cancelled the steam program in late 1994, they donated their ownership of No. 630 to TVRM in late 1998. Restoration work on the locomotive officially began at TVRM's Soule Shops around 1999 and over the next 12 years, it was overhauled and restored at a cost of almost $700,000. This was one of the most extensive steam locomotive overhauls ever carried out, as it required massive repairs to its frame, running gear, and boiler along with the flues and superheaters replaced. No. 630 was also given a newly welded smokebox and a larger tender originally used behind No. 4501, as the former's original tender was in very poor condition to be rebuilt.

=== 21st century excursion service ===
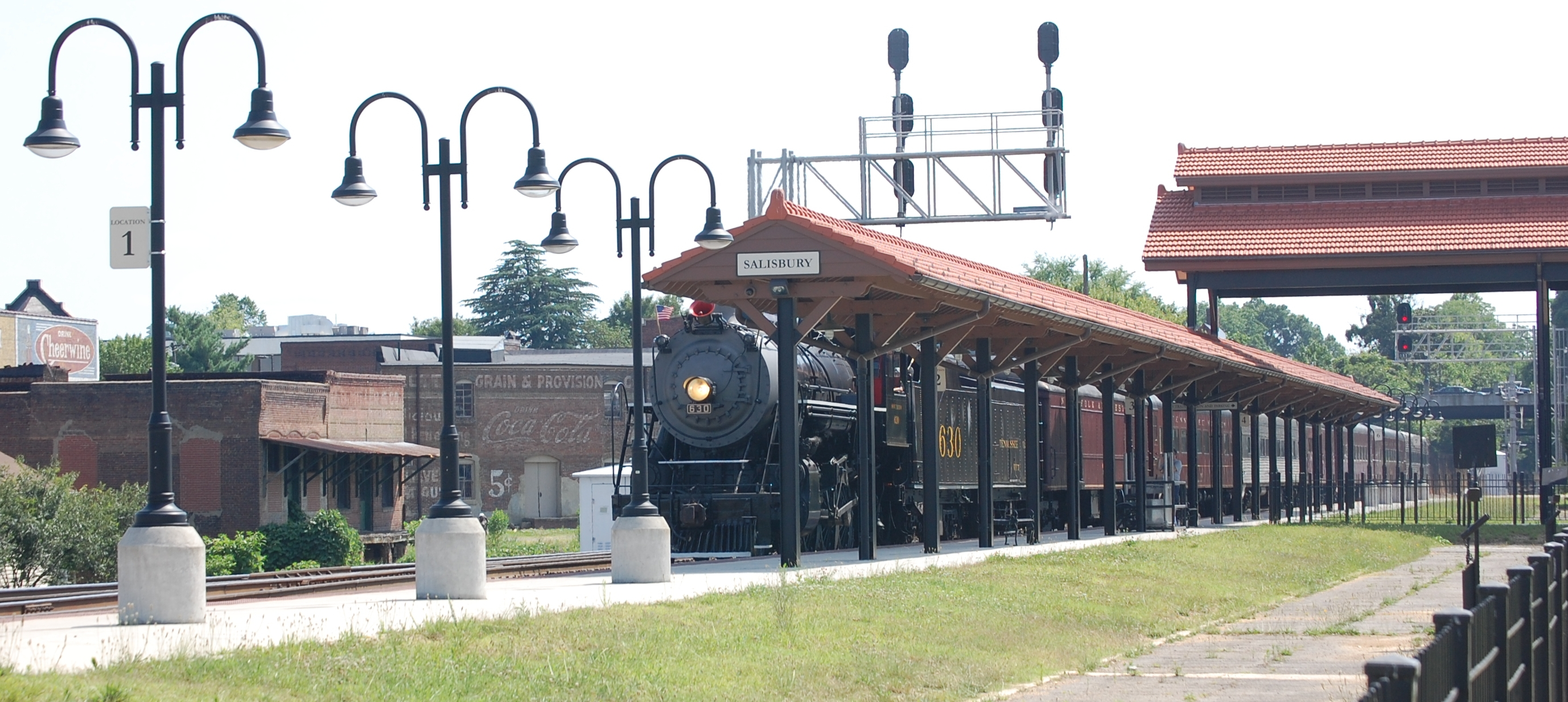
No. 630 passing through Salisbury station in Salisbury, North Carolina, on June 17, 2012.

The locomotive returned to operating service on March 18, 2011 for the first time in 22 years and pulled the weekend Missionary Ridge Local excursions on March 26. On April 6 that year, No. 630 pulled a passenger car with the officials of Volkswagen (VW), the city of Chattanooga, and the Hamilton County onboard. The train pulled into the newly formed Volkswagen Chattanooga Assembly Plant's rail yard, where the officials dedicated the brand-new site. On September 3-4, to coincided with the 50th anniversary of TVRM's formation and their annual Railfest, No. 630 pulled public mainline round-trip excursions, instituting NS' 21st Century Steam program. It pulled two of them between TVRM's Grand Junction Station and NS' DeButts Yard in downtown Chattanooga on the first day and others on the next day between Chattanooga and Cleveland, Tennessee. The locomotive then run TVRM's annual Summerville Steam Special excursions between the Grand Junction Station and Summerville, Georgia, running through the North Georgia mountains on the former COG route on October 8, 15, 22, and 29; and November 5 & 6. On November 8, No. 630 pulled a one-way mainline excursion trip from Chattanooga to Knoxville, Tennessee for the Lexington Group for Transportation History's annual meeting. At Knoxville, the locomotive met up with the Gulf and Ohio Railway's (G&O) ex-SOU G class 2-8-0 No. 154, who would take the excursion down to Alcoa, Tennessee and then back to Knoxville. On November 14, No. 630 returned to Chattanooga with another one-way NS excursion from Knoxville.

On May 31, 2012, with the 30th anniversary of NS' formation occurred, No. 630 made the ferry move from Chattanooga to Atlanta, where it pulled NS employee special excursions out of Downtown Atlanta to Forest Park, Georgia on June 2 and 3. The next day, the locomotive departed Atlanta with an overnight stop at Greenville, South Carolina, before arriving at the North Carolina Transportation Museum (NCTM) in Spencer, North Carolina on June 5, to haul short-mileage NCTM sponsored excursions from there to Barber Junction, North Carolina on June 9, 10, 16 and 17. On June 22, it participated in an NCTM photo charter, pulling vintage freight cars around the museum's area. The next day, No. 630 departed the NCTM with a one-way public excursion to Winston-Salem, North Carolina and then another one, running on the Punkinvine Line from there to Roanoke, Virginia, on June 24. At Roanoke, the locomotive pulled more NS employee special excursions between there and Walton, Virginia on June 30 and July 1. (Note: No. 630 was originally going to pull a public one-way excursion from Roanoke to Bristol, Virginia on July 7 and then another from Bristol to Knoxville on July 8, but it was sidelined by mechanical issues and NS No. 1065, a heritage unit diesel painted in S&A colors, was filled in for the role.) On July 12-13, No. 630 made the ferry move to Knoxville, where it pulled another NS employee special excursion between there and Alcoa on July 14 and 15, before returning to TVRM on the 16th. On September 1 and 2, the locomotive pulled more public mainline round-trip TVRM Railfest excursions to Cleveland. On September 13, No. 630 went to Birmingham to haul employee excursions between there and Irondale on the 15th and 16th. It then haul an 8 am public excursion from Birmingham to Parrish, Alabama and a 1 pm excursion to Wilton, Alabama on September 22 and 23. The next day, the locomotive returned to TVRM to run more scheduled Summerville Steam Special excursions on October 6, 13, 20, and 27; and November 3. On November 10, No. 630 concluded the 2012 season by pulling a public mainline round-trip excursion out of Chattanooga to Attalla, Alabama on ex-Alabama Great Southern (AGS) rails, and then another to Harriman, Tennessee on ex-Cincinnati, New Orleans and Texas Pacific (CNO&TP) line the next day.

On March 2, 2013, No. 630 pulled another Chattanooga-Attalla excursion and then goes to Bristol, Virginia on the 7th to haul the Radford Rambler excursion between there to Radford, Virginia on the 9th and the Lonesome Pine Limited to Bulls Gap, Tennessee on the 10th. The next day, it return to Roanoke to pull round-trip excursions out of there to Walton and Lynchburg on the 16th and then another Lynchburg excursion on the 17th. Afterwards, on the 18th, the locomotive went to Norfolk, Virginia to haul a round-trip excursion between there and Petersburg, Virginia on the 23rd. No. 630 then returned to the NCTM to more haul more round-trip excursions to Barber Junction on April 13. The next day, No. 630 traveled to Asheville to haul round-trip excursions out to Old Fort, North Carolina, via Old Fort Loops on April 20 and 21. This would be the first time the locomotive has returned to Asheville in 61 years. On April 22, it departed Asheville with a stop at Knoxville and returned to TVRM the next day. In September 2013, the locomotive pulled more round-trip excursions such as the TVRM Railfest from Chattanooga to Cleveland on the 7th-8th and two Steel City Rail Adventure excursions from Birmingham to Parrish and Wilton on 14th-15th. It then pulled more Summerville Steam Special excursions, scheduled for October 5, 12, 19, 20, and 26; and November 2. On November 9, No. 630 pulled the Attalla Autumn Adventure excursion out of Chattanooga to Attalla and the next day's East Tennessee Autumn Adventure to Oneida, Tennessee. On November 14, the locomotive traveled to Knoxville to pull the Asheville Autumn Adventure excursions between there to Asheville and back on the 16th-17th. It returned to TVRM on November 18, concluding the 2013 season.

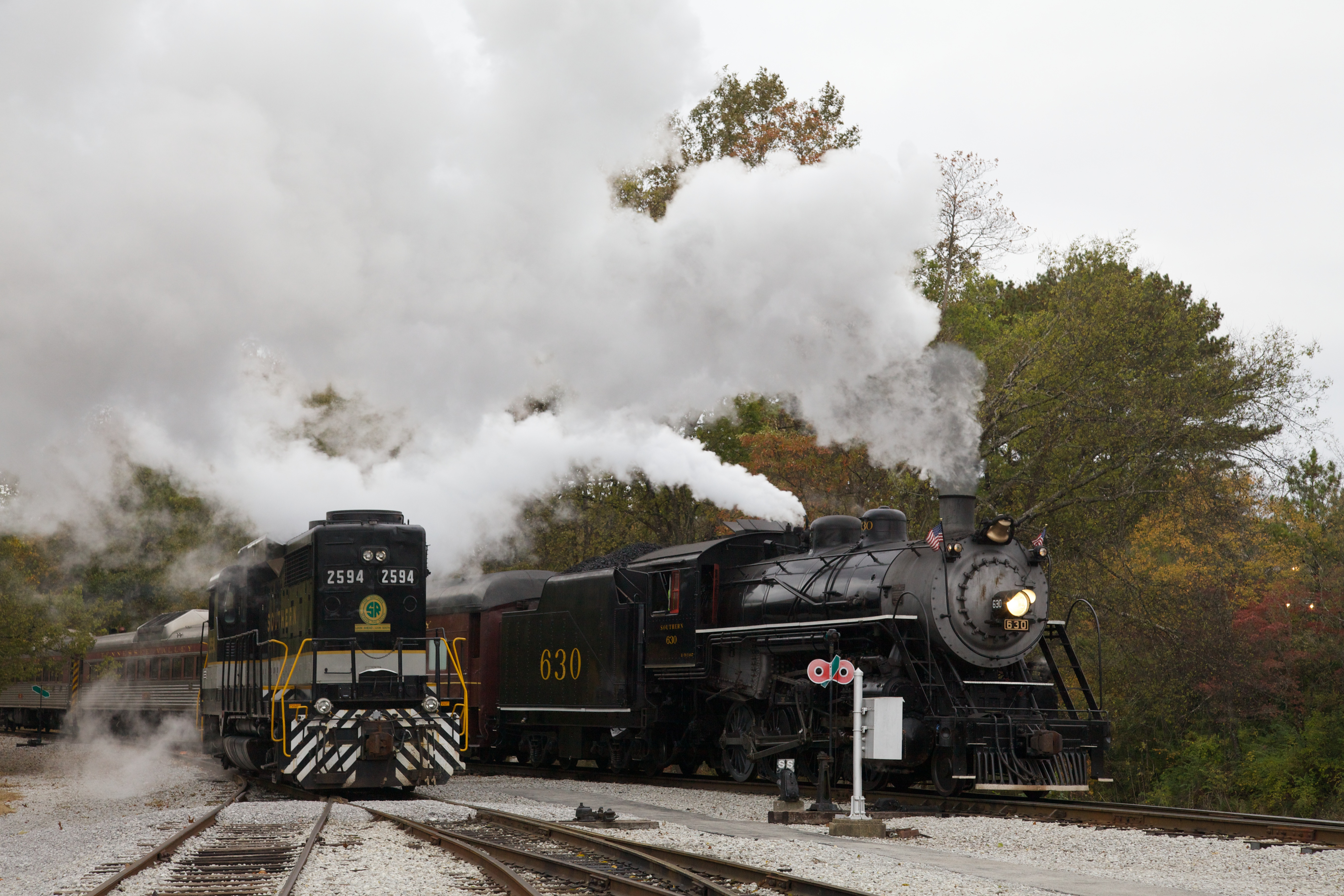
No. 630 approaching TVRM's Grand Junction Station with the Missionary Ridge Local in November 2014.

On April 5, 2014, No. 630 returned to Bristol to pull another Radford Rambler excursion and the next day's Lonesome Pine Limited later on. (Note: Originally, the locomotive's inaugural 2014 excursions were going to be the Attalla Special between Chattanooga and Attalla on March 29 and the next day's Oneida Flyer between Chattanooga and Oneida. However, No. 630 was sidelined for repairs and NS No. 8099, a heritage unit diesel painted in SOU colors, came to filled in.) It then traveled over to Grundy, Virginia to run on ex-Norfolk and Western (N&W) Buchanan Branch, pulling the rare-mileage Tri-County Mountaineer excursions between Grundy and Devon, West Virginia on April 12, 13, and 19. On May 17-18, the locomotive pulled the New Royal Palm excursion on ex-CNO&TP line between Cincinnati, Ohio and Danville, Kentucky. On May 31 and June 1, No. 630 pulled the Lexington Limited excursion between Lexington, Kentucky and Oneida. On June 7, it pulled the Steam Anniversary Special excursion between Chattanooga and Oneida, marking the 50th anniversary of SOU allowing steam locomotive No. 4501 to run on their rails. On most of these excursions, which were longer and heavier with more than 10 cars, No. 630 needed assisting diesels. But on other excursions, which were much shorter with less than 10 cars, the locomotive ran independently. On November 8, No. 630 joined a doubleheader run with No. 4501, which had recently returned to service, on the final Summerville Steam Special excursion of the 2014 season.

By late 2015, NS had officially discontinued their steam program, although No. 630 continues regular operations, hauling the Missionary Ridge Local at TVRM on weekends and occasionally double heads with No. 4501 for the Summerville Steam Special. On March 12-13, 2018, Nos. 630 and 4501 participated in Lerro Productions' Southern Railway photo charter, where they haul a mixed freight train consist at the TVRM section on the former day and the Summerville branch line on the latter day. In August 2023, TVRM operated No. 630 on the weekend Evening Ridge Runner excursions, which ran between TVRM's Grand Junction Station and the Soule Shop during evening times. On September 6-7, 2025, during TVRM's Founder's Day weekend, No. 630 was repainted with white trims, whitewall wheels, and a red number plate to resemble on how it looked during its revenue service in the 1940s. (Note: It also wore an SOU 12 inch "Bootleg" single chime hooter whistle.) On November 3 that year, the locomotive was taken out of service to undergo its Federal Railroad Administration (FRA) 1,472-day inspection and overhaul. It was getting some of its boiler washout plugs being inspected and cleaned.

== See also ==
- Great Smoky Mountains Railroad 1702
- Nickel Plate Road 765
- Norfolk and Western 475
- Southern Railway 385
- Southern Railway 401
- U.S. Sugar 148
- W. Graham Claytor Jr.

== Bibliography ==
- Coniglio, John (2025). Steam in the Valley: A history of the Tennessee Valley Railroad Museum Volume 1, 1961-1998 (3rd ed.). Tennessee Valley Railroad Museum. LCCN 97-70709.
- Ferrell, Mallory H. (1991). Tweetsie Country (2nd ed.). The Overmountain Press. ISBN 0-93280758-5.
- Waite, John R. (2003). Blue Ridge Stemwinder: An Illustrated History of the East Tennessee & Western North Carolina Railroad and the Linville River Railway (1st ed.). Overmountain Press. ISBN 1-57072-272-2.
- Wrinn, Jim (2000). Steam's Camelot: Southern and Norfolk Southern Excursions in Color (1st ed.). TLC Publishing. ISBN 1-883089-56-5.
