= Tennessee Valley Railroad 610 =

Class of 1 post-WWII American Army 2-8-0 locomotive

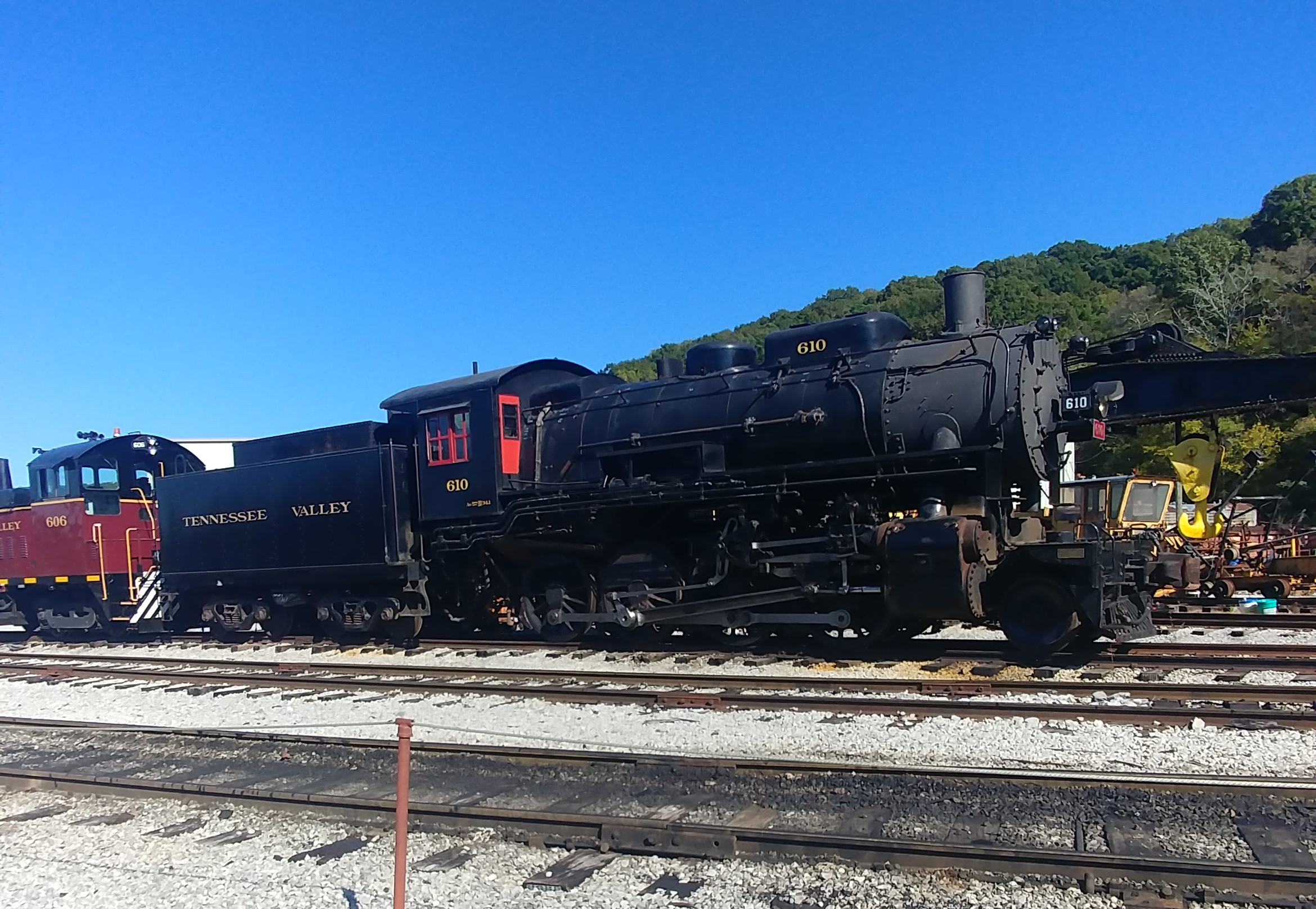
- No. 610 sitting outside at the Tennessee Valley Railroad Museum's East Chattanooga Station, October 23, 2021
Type and origin
- Power type: Steam
- Builder: Baldwin-Lima-Hamilton
- Serial number: 75503
- Build date: March 1952
Specifications
- Configuration
  - Whyte: 2-8-0
  - UIC: 1′D h2
- Gauge: 4 ft 8 1/2 in (1,435 mm)
- Driver dia.: 56 in (1.422 m)
- Loco weight: 163,000 lb (74,000 kg)
- Fuel type: Coal
- Fuel capacity: 11 t (11 long tons; 12 short tons)
- Water cap.: 6,500 US gal (25,000 L; 5,400 imp gal)
- Boiler pressure: 200 psi (1.38 MPa), formerly 220 psi (1.52 MPa)
- Cylinders: Two, outside
- Cylinder size: 20 in × 26 in (508 mm × 660 mm)
- Valve gear: Walschaerts
- Valve type: Piston valves
- Loco brake: Air
- Train brakes: Air
- Couplers: Knuckle
Career
- Operators: United States Army; Fort Eustis Military Railroad; Tennessee Valley Railroad Museum; Norfolk Southern Railway (leased)
- Class: S160
- Numbers: USA 610; TVRM 610
- Retired: 1972
- Restored: August 1990
- Current owner: Tennessee Valley Railroad Museum
- Disposition: In storage
- Tennessee Valley Railroad Museum Rolling Stock
- U.S. National Register of Historic Places
- Location within Tennessee Location within the United States
- Location: 2202 N. Chamberlain Ave., Chattanooga, Tennessee
- Coordinates: 35°3′43″N 85°15′1″W
- Built: 1952
- Built by: Baldwin-Lima-Hamilton
- NRHP reference No.: 80003824
- Added to NRHP: August 6, 1980

Tennessee Valley Railroad 610 is a preserved S160 class 2-8-0 "Consolidation" type steam locomotive, built by the Baldwin-Lima-Hamilton Corporation (BLW) for the U.S. Army in March 1952. It is one of the last steam locomotives built for service in the United States and the last new steam locomotive acquired by the U.S. Army. In 1980, the locomotive and other pieces of the museum's rolling stock was added to the NRHP under the Tennessee Valley Railroad Museum Rolling Stock listing. As of now, No. 610 is owned by the Tennessee Valley Railroad Museum (TVRM).

== History ==
No. 610 was the very last steam locomotive to be built by Baldwin-Lima-Hamilton (BLW) for an American customer, being built in March 1952. By the end of the 1950s, No. 610 was one of eight steam locomotives owned by the U.S. Army railroad and was used to train military soldiers in railroad operation and maintenance. It also operated on the 31 mi (50 km) long Fort Eustis Military Railroad (FEMR) to an interchange with the U.S. railroad at a junction in Lee Hall, Virginia.

When the Fort Eustis Military Railroad decommissioned steam operations in 1972, No. 610 was obtained by the Wiregrass Heritage Chapter of the National Railway Historical Society (NRHS) of Dothan, Alabama. In 1978, the locomotive was donated to the Tennessee Valley Railroad Museum (TVRM) of Chattanooga, Tennessee, where it was put into storage for the next nine years since TVRM is operating No. 630, another 2-8-0 leased from the Southern Railway. In January 1987, it was pulled from storage and moved into the TVRM shops to be restored to operational condition. TVRM crews opted to abandon No. 610's U.S. Army livery and modify it with a taller cab and a taller smokestack to improve its cosmetic appearance. Restoration work lasted for three years until work was completed in August 1990. No. 610 would then became TVRM's regular service steam locomotive for the remainder of that year's operating season.

In August 1990, No. 610 was leased by the Norfolk Southern Railway (NS) to replace Norfolk and Western 1218 on two mainline excursions between Huntsville, Alabama and Chattanooga, and it was assisted by two NS diesel locomotives. No. 610 was subsequently used sparingly to pull NS' mainline excursions, before the railroad discontinued the steam program in 1994.

No. 610 continued to pull the TVRM's yearly excursion trains, until it was taken out of service for its Federal Railroad Administration (FRA) mandated 1,472-day inspection on December 11, 2010. In 2018, No. 610 was moved to the TVRM's Soule Shops, where it currently awaits a major overhaul. As of 2023, the overhaul progress is put on hold until further notice.

== See also ==
- Great Smoky Mountains Railroad 1702
- Southern Railway 722
- Southern Railway 4501

== Bibliography ==
- Coniglio, John (2025). Steam in the Valley: A history of the Tennessee Valley Railroad Museum Volume 1, 1961-1998 (3rd ed.). Tennessee Valley Railroad Museum. LCCN 97-70709.
- Wrinn, Jim (2000). Steam's Camelot: Southern and Norfolk Southern Excursions in Color (1st ed.). TLC Publishing. ISBN 1-883089-56-5.
