= Great Smoky Mountains Railroad 1702 =

Preserved 2-8-0 steam locomotive, based in North Carolina

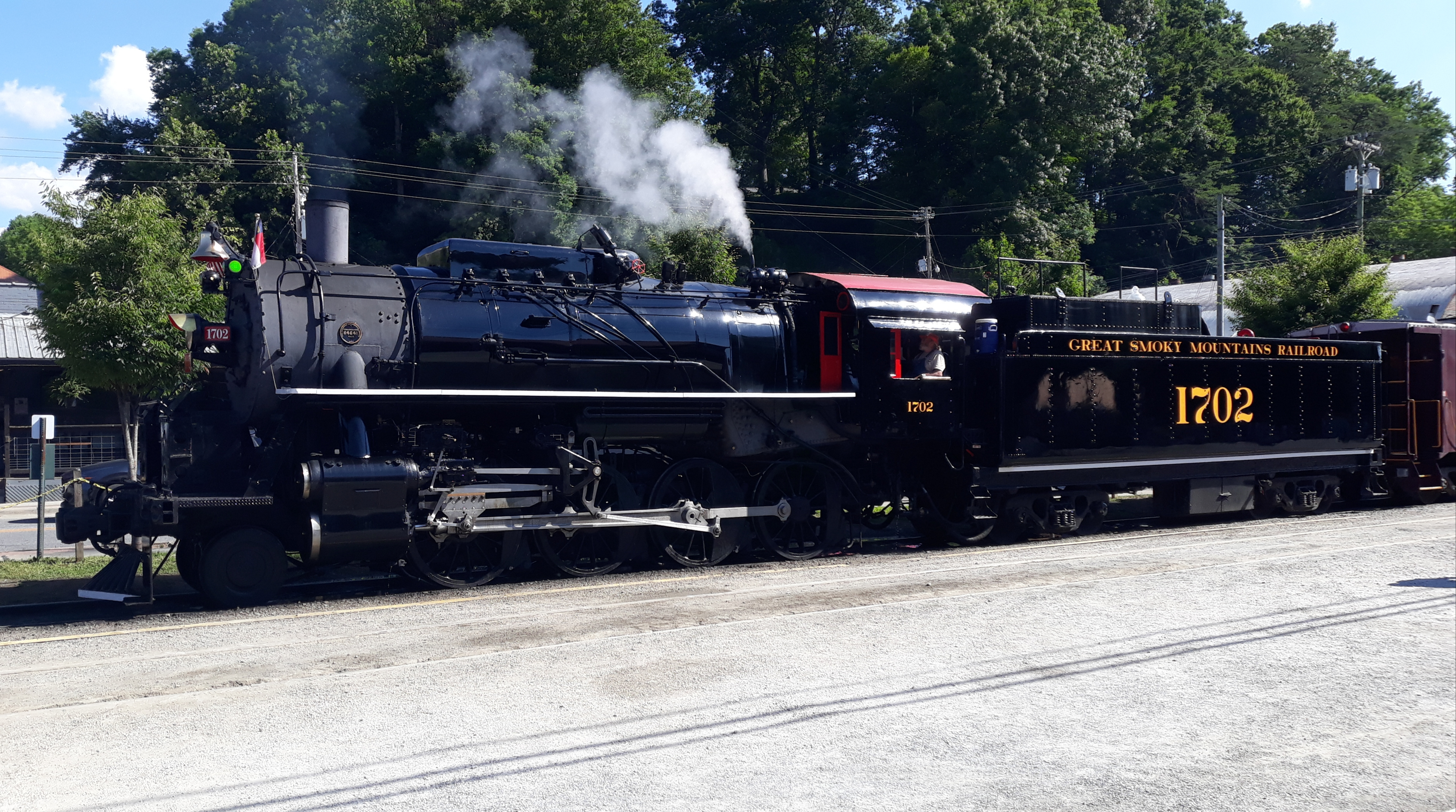
- GSMR No. 1702 at Bryson City, North Carolina, on June 18, 2022
Type and origin
- Power type: Steam
- Designer: Major J. W. Marsh
- Builder: Baldwin Locomotive Works
- Serial number: 64641
- Build date: September 1942
Specifications
- Configuration
  - Whyte: 2-8-0
  - UIC: 1′D h2
- Gauge: 4 ft 8 1/2 in (1,435 mm)
- Leading dia.: 2 ft 9 in (838 mm)
- Driver dia.: 4 ft 9 in (1,448 mm)
- Wheelbase: 51 ft 7 3/4 in (15.74 m)
- Adhesive weight: 140,000 lb (63,503 kg)
- Loco weight: 161,000 lb (73,028 kg)
- Fuel type: New: Coal; Now: No. 4 fuel oil
- Fuel capacity: Old tender: 1,800 US gal (6,800 L; 1,500 imp gal) of oil, formerly 10 t (9.8 long tons; 11 short tons) of coal; New tender: 3,600 US gal (14,000 L; 3,000 imp gal) of oil
- Water cap.: Old tender: 6,500 US gal (25,000 L; 5,400 imp gal); New tender: 10,000 US gal (38,000 L; 8,300 imp gal)
- Firebox
  - Grate area: 41 sq ft (3.8 m^{2})
- Boiler: 5 ft 10 in (1.78 m) maximum diameter
- Boiler pressure: 225 psi (1.55 MPa)
- Heating surface
  - Firebox: 136 sq ft (12.6 m^{2})
  - Tubes: 1,055 sq ft (98.0 m^{2}) (150 in or 3,810 mm long × 2 in or 51 mm diameter)
  - Flues: 567 sq ft (52.7 m^{2}) (30 in or 762 mm long × 5.375 in or 137 mm diameter)
  - Total surface: 2,253 sq ft (209.3 m^{2})
- Superheater
  - Type: Type A
  - Heating area: 313 sq ft (29.1 m^{2})
- Cylinders: Two, outside
- Cylinder size: 19 in × 26 in (482.6 mm × 660.4 mm) bore x stroke
- Valve gear: Walschaerts
- Valve type: 10 inches (254 mm) piston valves
- Loco brake: Air
- Train brakes: Air
- Couplers: Knuckle
Performance figures
- Maximum speed: 45 mph (72 km/h)
- Tractive effort: 31,500 lbf (140.1 kN)
- Factor of adh.: 4.45
Career
- Operators: U.S. Army Transportation Corps; Warren and Saline River Railroad; Reader Railroad; Fremont and Elkhorn Valley Railroad; Great Smoky Mountains Railroad
- Class: S160
- Numbers: USATC 1702; WSR 1702; RERX 1702; FEVR 1702; GSMR 1702
- Retired: 1961 (revenue service); 2004 (1st excursion service)
- Restored: September 1964 (1st excursion service); July 21, 2016 (2nd excursion service)
- Current owner: Great Smoky Mountains Railroad
- Disposition: Operational

Great Smoky Mountains Railroad 1702 is an S160 class 2-8-0 "Consolidation" type steam locomotive, built in September 1942 by the Baldwin Locomotive Works (BLW) in Philadelphia, Pennsylvania, originally for the U.S. Army Transportation Corps during World War II. After the war ended, the No. 1702 locomotive worked on two railroads in Arkansas and one in Nebraska. Originally built to run on coal, No. 1702 was converted to burn oil around 1946.

In late 1991, the No. 1702 locomotive was purchased by the Great Smoky Mountains Railroad (GSMR) in Bryson City, North Carolina, where it hauled tourist train excursions on the half of the former Southern Railway (SOU) Murphy Branch, which spans 53 miles (85 kilometers) of track between Dillsboro and Nantahala, North Carolina. After 2004, it went out of service due to firebox issues but was later restored back to operating condition and returned to service in 2016. No. 1702 is currently one of twenty-six S160 steam locomotives preserved in the United States and abroad.

== History ==
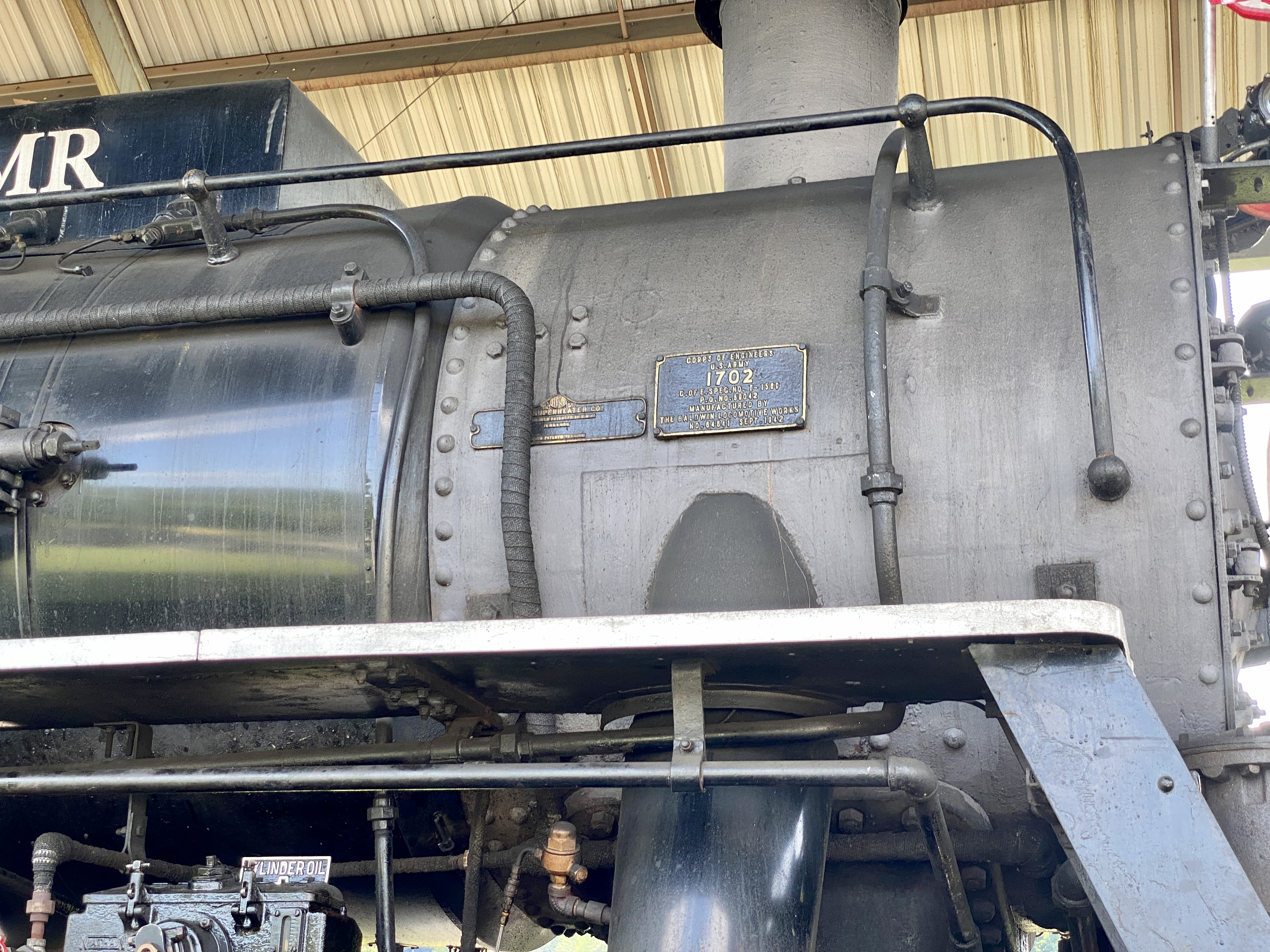
No. 1702's rectangular builder's plate

No. 1702 is an S160 steam locomotive built in September 1942 by the Baldwin Locomotive Works in Philadelphia, Pennsylvania, originally for the U.S. Army Transportation Corps, where it was stationed for training purposes at the Fort Bragg military base in Fayetteville, North Carolina during World War II. In 1946, a year after the war ended, the No. 1702 locomotive was sold to the Warren and Saline River Railroad (WSR) in Warren, Arkansas, where it was assigned to haul lumber trains. When first built, No. 1702 was originally equipped with buffers and chain couplers, which were eventually replaced with knuckle couplers. Additionally, its firebox was modified to burn fuel oil as opposed to coal.

When WSR was dieselized in 1961, the No. 1702 locomotive was sold to the Reader Railroad (RERX) in Hot Springs, Arkansas, where it was upgraded with a larger tender that was originally used behind a Rock Island steam locomotive and holds 3,600 US gallons (14,000 L) of fuel and 10,000 US gallons (38,000 L) of water. Afterwards, the No. 1702 locomotive was placed into service in September 1964 and began serving tourist operations on the RERX. In 1985, it was sold again to the Fremont and Elkhorn Valley Railroad (FEVR) in Fremont, Nebraska, where the No. 1702 locomotive ran tourist trains on the former Chicago and North Western line between Fremont and Hooper, Nebraska.

In September 1991, the No. 1702 locomotive was purchased by the Great Smoky Mountains Railroad (GSMR) in Bryson City, North Carolina, where it was significantly altered with a taller smokestack, a larger sand dome, and a wider cab to resemble a more typical American steam locomotive. Afterwards, in June 1992, No. 1702 was placed into service and the GSMR operated the locomotive with the Nantahala Gorge and Tuckasegee River tourist excursions on the half of the former Southern Railway Murphy Branch, which spans 53 miles (85 kilometers) of track between Dillsboro and Nantahala, North Carolina. When working on these excursions, No. 1702 uses 400 US gallons (1,500 L) of fuel and 3,500 US gallons (13,000 L) of water per round trip.

In 2003, No. 1702 went out of service to undergo repairs and GSMR loaned ex-Graham County Railroad Shay locomotive No. 1925 from the North Carolina Transportation Museum in Spencer, North Carolina for that year's season. Afterwards, the No. 1702 locomotive returned to service in 2004 until being sidelined again at the end of that year due to firebox issues and became disassembled outside the GSMR's workshop area in Dillsboro, North Carolina, exposed to the elements. In April 2012, the GSMR made an agreement with the Swain County of North Carolina, who donated $700,000 to construct a new steam locomotive workshop for the restoration of No. 1702 and installing a new turntable in Bryson City for the locomotive to be turned around. Afterwards, the restoration work of No. 1702 began in May 2014 and completed on July 21, 2016 with the locomotive returned to service five days later. (Note: Originally, No. 1702's reentry to service was scheduled for July 22, 2016, but delayed due to the locomotive being sidelined with an overheated bearing.)

== Appearances in media ==
- No. 1702 made its first cameo appearance in the 1966 film This Property Is Condemned.
- In 1972, No. 1702 made its second cameo appearance in the film Boxcar Bertha.

== See also ==
- Alaska Railroad 557
- Southern Railway 630
- Southern Railway 722
- Tennessee Valley Railroad 610

== Bibliography ==
- Plott, Jacob; Plott, Bob (2021). Smoky Mountain Railways (1st ed.). The History Press. ISBN 978-1-4671-4459-9.
