= Tennessee Valley Railroad Museum =

Railroad museum in Chattanooga, Tennessee

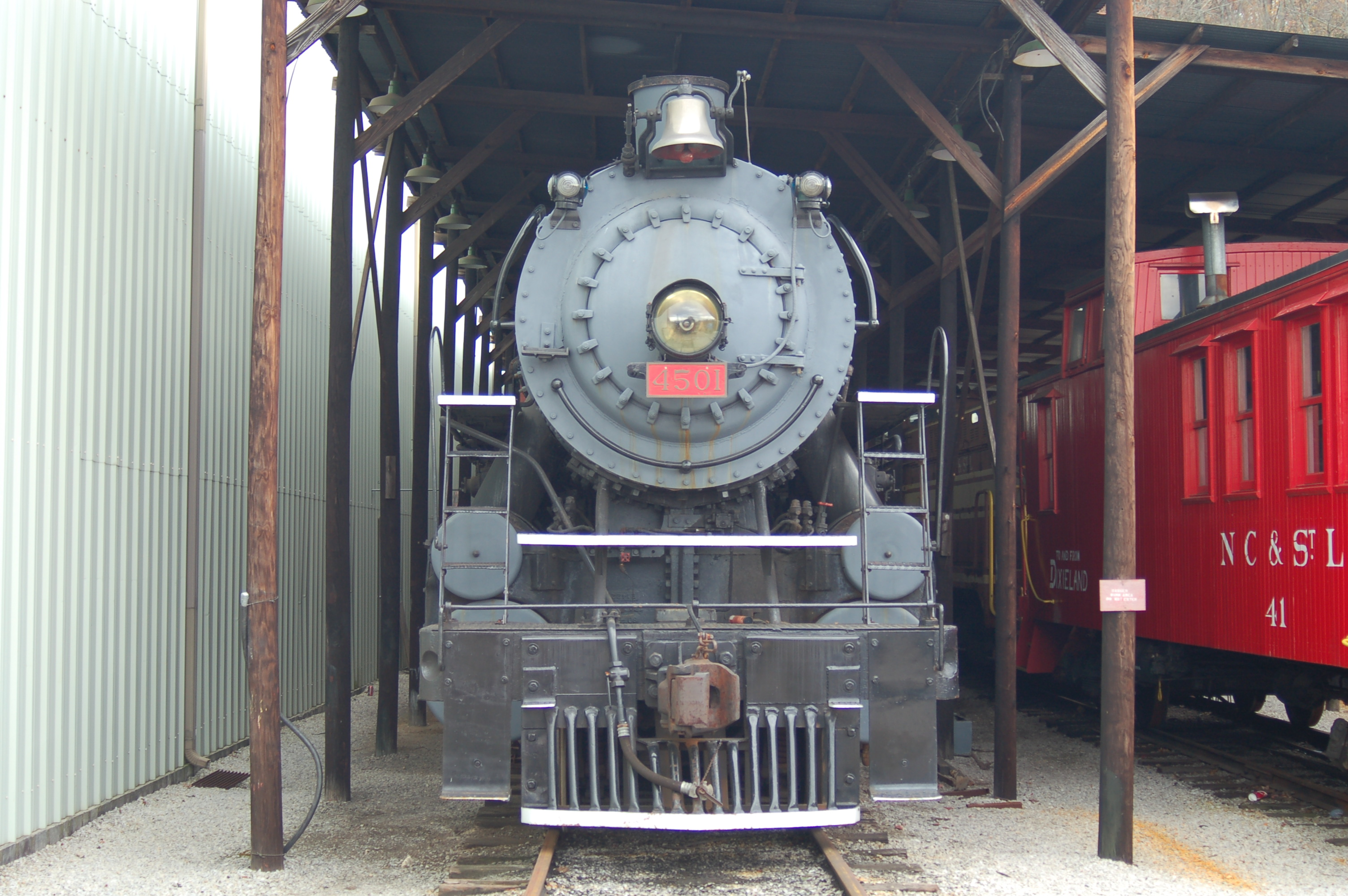
- Southern Railway 4501, one of six steam locomotives at the museum.

- Location of TVRM within Tennessee
- Established: 1960 / 1961
- Location: 4119 Cromwell Rd. Chattanooga, Tennessee, U.S.
- Coordinates: 35.066667°N 85.206389°W
- President: Tim Andrews
- Website: www.tvrail.com

The Tennessee Valley Railroad Museum (reporting mark TVRM) is a railroad museum and heritage railroad located in Chattanooga, Tennessee. It was initially founded as a chapter of the National Railway Historical Society in 1960 by a group of local railway preservationists. The organization was established to preserve obsolete locomotives and railway equipment. The museum operates tourist excursions from stations in Chattanooga and Etowah, Tennessee.

== History ==
The Tennessee Valley Railroad Museum (TVRM) was founded on August 11, 1961, by DuPont electronic engineer Paul H. Merriman and General Railway Signal Company field representative Robert M. Soule, Jr. to preserve obsolete locomotives and rolling stock. The museum originally stored their recently acquired equipment at the Western Union pole yard, which was located adjacent to the Southern Railway (SOU) classification yard on Holtzclaw Avenue in East Chattanooga. After the termination of passenger service to the former SOU Terminal Station in 1970, additional cars and locomotives were stored at this facility in downtown Chattanooga.

In 1969, the TVRM received a land donation from the Southern Railway, consisting of a property located in East Chattanooga on North Chamberlain Avenue. This donation included the 986-foot (301 m)-long Whiteside Tunnel and about 1 1/2 miles (2.4 km) of abandoned right-of-way.

On May 7, 1972, the museum opened a new permanent facility to the public in East Chattanooga. At the time, it had no structures on site. Volunteers had constructed a railyard for the storage and repair of equipment and had rebuilt the abandoned rail line through the Whiteside Tunnel. The reconstructed line ended at Tunnel Boulevard, as the original bridge over this road had been removed some years earlier.

With the reconstructed rail line, the museum had the ability to produce a small amount of income by operating a heritage railroad. They ran passenger excursion trains through Whiteside Tunnel (commonly referred to as Missionary Ridge Tunnel, because it went through Missionary Ridge).

Additional income was derived from mainline excursions operated biannually via the Southern Railway's Steam Program. The Southern Railway's Steam Program was created by the Southern Railway, led by W. Graham Claytor, Jr., in 1966. Merriman had purchased the former Southern Railway 4501 in 1964 from the Kentucky & Tennessee Railway in Stearns, Kentucky for $5,000 of his own money. By 1966 the 4501 had been restored during a 2-year process, conducted at Lucey Boiler Company in Chattanooga. After many volunteer hours by TVRM members as well as paid Lucey Boiler employee work, the 4501 was operated throughout the Southern Railway System.

In 1977, the TVRM constructed a bridge over Tunnel Boulevard. The Southern Railway donated an additional mile and a half (2.4 km) of abandoned rail line. The next major task of the museum was to build the East Chattanooga Depot. This depot is a reconstruction of a typical small town depot of the 1920s.

The TVRM was named to the National Register of Historic Places on August 6, 1980. That was followed during that decade by expansion of the organization, and acquiring more land donated by Southern Railway. During the 1980s, the TVRM gradually added more track and buildings. The Grand Junction Depot, the TVRM Administration Building, and the National Model Railroad Association were starting to take shape during the decade, as well. At the East Chattanooga facility, a repair shop and a turntable were added to provide facilities for locomotive repair and maintenance. Beginning in the 1990s, TVRM started running trains to the Chattanooga Choo Choo (called the Downtown Arrow, now discontinued) and excursions to Summerville, Georgia on the Chattooga and Chickamauga Railway.

In 2004, TVRM and the Tennessee Overhill Heritage Association partnered in acquiring part of the former L&N Hook and Eye line between Etowah (Gee Creek, Tennessee) and Copperhill. Following the acquisition, the TVRM established two operating divisions: the Chattanooga Division and the Hiwassee Division. Crews and sometimes equipment are often switched between the two.

The museum celebrated 50 years during the Labor Day weekend of 2011. Norfolk Southern Railway also debuted their new steam excursion program during the event until 2015. Around October 2021, TVRM opened their new Exhibit Hall building adjacent to the Grand Junction Station building for guests to experience.

== Current operations ==
The TVRM operates local freight service and regular passenger excursions. The museum runs a regular one-hour, 6-mile (9.7 km) round-trip excursion. Mainline excursions operate on weekends from April through November.

In 2004, the TVRM introduced regular excursions over the Hiwassee Loop around Bald Mountain near Farner, Tennessee. These operations originate at the station in Etowah, Tennessee, located 63 miles (101 km) northeast of Chattanooga. Passengers transfer via bus to the Hiwassee/Ocoee Scenic River State Park due to freight traffic on the CSX mainline. The 50-mile (80 km) route runs east along the Hiwassee River through the Hiwassee Gorge to Farner, while extended day routes continue south to Copperhill, Tennessee and McCaysville, Georgia.

This route is that of the former Atlanta, Knoxville and Northern Railway and is also called the Hiwassee Route. The remainder of the AK&N (later L&N and then CSX) line in Georgia is operated by the Georgia Northeastern Railroad, with subsidiary Blue Ridge Scenic Railway operating another heritage railroad from McCaysville to Blue Ridge, Georgia, and GNRR freight running south of there.

TVRM also handles freight. On TVRM's Chattanooga Division, there is one industry, Allied Metals. TVRM handles switching operations, under the wholly owned subsidiary Tyner Terminal Railway Company, at Enterprise South Industrial Park (ESIP), location of the Volkswagen Chattanooga Assembly Plant. Even though there are no major industries along the Hiwassee Division, TVRM has the capability to store several hundred cars at the Copperhill yard for other railroads.

TVRM also operates the East Chattanooga Belt Railway, which as of early 2026 has three active customers.

== Restoration work ==
TVRM has a working locomotive and car repair shop complex built in 1982, named “Soule Shops” in honor of museum co-founder Robert M. Soule Jr.

In March 2011, TVRM completed restoring Southern Railway Ks-1 class 2-8-0 630 to operational status. In September 2014, TVRM completed the second restoration of Southern Railway Ms class 2-8-2 4501 for another excursion career with Norfolk Southern's 21st Century Steam Excursion Program.

TVRM’s shop and mechanical department are able to perform almost any job pertaining to restoration and upkeep of vintage railroad equipment. TVRM also occasionally does contract work including but not limited to flue swaging, wheel turning, locomotive and rolling stock painting, diesel locomotive servicing, sheet metal fabrication, complete passenger car restoration, machining, and welding.

== Equipment ==
=== Locomotives ===
Locomotive details
Number	Image	Type	Model	Built	Builder	Serial Number/Frame Number	Status
10		Steam	2-8-2	1920	Baldwin Locomotive Works	53182	Stored, Disassembled
80		Diesel	GP38	1968	Electro-Motive Division	33802	Operational
109		Diesel	RS-3	1950	American Locomotive Company	78247	Stored, In-Operative. Partially Disassembled
200		Diesel	VO-1000	1941	Baldwin Locomotive Works	64258	Operational. Frisco Designation VO-1000RP, 1987 reclassified SW1200.
205		Diesel	SD9	1955	Electro-Motive Division	20447	Stored, In-Operative.
349		Steam	4-4-0	1891	Baldwin Locomotive Works	11994	Display, loaned to the Children's Hospital at Erlanger
606		Diesel	SW1200	1954	Electro-Motive Division	20047	Operational
610		Steam	2-8-0	1952	Baldwin Locomotive Works	75503	Stored, Awaiting 1,472-Overhaul. Partially Disassembled
630		Steam	2-8-0	1904	American Locomotive Company	28446	Stored, Pending 1,472-Overhaul
710		Diesel	GP7	1950	Electro-Motive Division	10551	Operational
814		Diesel	F7A	1949	Electro-Motive Division	5798	Stored, In-Operative. Privately Owned
913		Diesel	RS-1	1950	American Locomotive Company	77848	Stored, In-Operative. Faux GMO Paint
1230		Diesel	SD40	1969	Electro-Motive Division	34759	Operational
1504		Steam	4-6-2	1919	American Locomotive Company	59314	Stored, Disassembled
1824		Diesel	GP7L	1951	Electro-Motive Division	15694	Stored, In-Operative
1829		Diesel	GP7L	1951	Electro-Motive Division	15699	Stored, In-Operative
2004		Diesel	GP38	1970	Electro-Motive Division	36470	Operational
2005		Diesel	GP38	1970	Electro-Motive Division	36471	Operational
3170		Diesel	SD40	1971	Electro-Motive Division	37355	Stored, In-Operative
4501		Steam	2-8-2	1911	Baldwin Locomotive Works	37085	Operational
5000		Diesel	GP38-2	1972	Electro-Motive Division	5809-1	Operational
5044		Diesel	GP38-2	1973	Electro-Motive Division	7362-35	Operational
5109		Diesel	GP38-2	1974	Electro-Motive Division	73752-2	Operational
6914		Diesel	E8	1953	Electro-Motive Division	19012	Under restoration
7100		Diesel	S-2	1943	American Locomotive Company	70225	Stored, In-Operative
7467		Diesel	VO-1000	1943	Baldwin Locomotive Works	67738	Display, In-Operative
8669		Diesel	RSD-1	1945	American Locomotive Company	72162	Stored
8677		Diesel	RSD-1	1945	American Locomotive Company	72170	Stored, In-Operative
F3060		Diesel	H-16-66	1958	Fairbanks-Morse	16L1157	Display, In-Operative
576		Diesel	F7A	1949	Electro-Motive Division	8551	Under restoration
578		Diesel	F7A	1949	Electro-Motive Division	10151	Stored, In-Operative

=== Visiting units ===
Locomotive details
Number	Image	Type	Model	Built	Builder	Serial number	Status	Notes
2594		Diesel	GP30	1962	Electro-Motive Division	28564	Out of service	Leased from the Southeastern Railway Museum

=== Former units ===
Number	Image	Type	Model	Built	Builder	Notes
1		Steam	2-4-2	1920	H.K. Porter	Built by H.K. Porter in 1920 for the Cherokee Brick and Tile Company in Macon, Georgia. Purchased by the National Railroad Historical Society in 1964 and ran excursions in South Carolina. The unit was later retired and sold to the museum but was determined to lack the power and speed needed by the museum. The unit was purchased by the Cowan Railroad Museum in 1979 and was moved to Cowan, Tennessee where the unit remains on display.
3		Steam	0-4-0T	1924	American Locomotive Company	Built by the American Locomotive Company in 1924 for the Southern Wood Company in Chattanooga. Retired 1961 and sold to Paul Merriman. Sold to the Age of Steam Roundhouse in Sugarcreek, Ohio in 1994. Currently on static display.
35		Steam	Shay Class C	1910	Lima Locomotive Works	Built by Lima Locomotive Works in 1910, it was purchased by a heritage railway in Australia in 2014. However it is unclear whether the unit has left the states or not, as the organization went inactive shortly after.
36		Steam	Shay Class C	1911	Lima Locomotive Works	Built by Lima Locomotive Works in 1910, it now resides at the Cass Scenic Railroad.
203		Steam	2-10-0	1928	Baldwin Locomotive Works	Built by Baldwin Locomotive Works in January 1928 at Alabama, Tennessee and Northern Railroad #402. Sold to the Gainesville Midland Railroad in 1946 and renumbered to 203. Retired in 1959 and later donated to the Atlanta Chapter of the National Railroad Historical Society in 1961. Arrived at TVRM on January 8, 1964. It was to be repaired and used for excursions but paperwork supporting its transfer to TVRM was never completed. It remained on static display for over 25 years until being sent back to Atlanta. It is currently on static display at the Southeastern Railway Museum in Duluth, Georgia.
509		Steam	4-6-0	1913	Baldwin Locomotive Works	Built by Baldwin Locomotive Works in April 1913 as Louisiana and Arkansas Railway #403, later renumbered to 509. Sold to the Louisiana Midland Railroad in 1950 where it was later involved in a collision with an L&A 2-8-2 in 1952. Sold to the Rapides Gravel Company and hauled gravel there until retirement in 1966. Sold to a railfan named John Thompson in 1968 who later sold it to the Whitewater Valley Railroad in 1974. Arrived at TVRM in 1982. Sold to the Cookeville Depot Museum in 2002. Currently on display, disguised as Tennessee Central Railway #509.
611		Steam	2-8-0	1943	Baldwin Locomotive Works	Built by Baldwin Locomotive Works in 1943 as U.S. Army #2628. Later renumbered to 611 in 1951. Sold to the Texas State Railroad in the 1970s. Arrived at TVRM in 1991. Sold off to Bill Miller Equipment Sales in 2010.
722		Steam	2-8-0	1904	Baldwin Locomotive Works	Built by Baldwin Locomotive Works in September 1904. Sold to the East Tennessee and Western North Carolina Railroad in 1952 and renumbered to 208. Retired in December 1967 and sold to the Southern to participate in the steam program. Leased and operated at TVRM from 1980 – 1985, put on static display due to a cracked firebox. Transferred to the Asheville Chapter NRHS in 1992. Sold to the Great Smoky Mountains Railroad in Bryson City, North Carolina in December 2000, currently under restoration to operating condition.
5288		Steam	4-6-2	1919	Montreal Locomotive Works	Initially constructed for the Grand Trunk Railway before ownership of the engine was obtained by the Canadian National Railway. In 1961, the engine was sold to F. Nelson Blount for his Steamtown, U.S.A. collection, and the engine would be put on display in Bellows Falls, Vermont before it was eventually moved to Scranton, Pennsylvania. In 2001, 5288 was sold to the TVRM, where it was put on display near the Chattanooga depot. It would later provide parts for Southern 4501's restoration. In 2023, the engine was acquired by the Colebrookdale Railroad.
Flying Duchess		Steam	0-6-0T	1952	Robert Stephenson and Hawthorns	Built in North East England in 1952 and worked at the Meaford Power Station in Staffordshire, England. Later sold to the Boyne City Railroad in Boyne City, Michigan. Operated at TVRM from 1978 to 1980. Currently on static display in La Grange, Kentucky.

=== Passenger cars ===
Passenger car details
Railroad Company	Image	Operating Number	Car Name	Car Type	Status
Baltimore & Ohio		98	(ex-Eden Isle)	Business	Operational
Central of Georgia		390	(ex-Man O'War)	Combine	Operational
Central of Georgia		661		Coach	Operational
Central of Georgia		662		Coach	Operational
Central of Georgia		906		Coach	Operational
Central of Georgia		907		Coach	Operational
Southern		832		Coach	Operational
Richmond, Fredericksburg and Potomac		857		Coach	Operational
Missouri Pacific		873		Coach	Operational
Grand Trunk Western		899	Silver Lake	Dining	Operational
Pullman Co.			Clover Colony	Sleeper	Operational
Pullman Co.			Maitland	Sleeper	Restoration
Southern		1000		Coach	Operational
Southern		1037		Coach	Operational
Norfolk & Western		1486	Randolph-Macon College	Coach	Operational
Norfolk & Western		1488	Emory and Henry College	Coach	Operational
Canadian Pacific		15401	Algonquin Park	Observation/Dome	Operational, Leased
Southern		1683		Coach	Stored
Chesapeake & Ohio		1877	(ex-Linoma)	Dome-Observation	Operational, leased
Louisville & Nashville		2728	Cross Keys Tavern	Dining	Display
Louisville & Nashville		3101		Coach/Lounge	Operational
Southern		3158	(ex-Travelers Fare)	Dining	Operational
Southern		3164		Dining	Operational, leased
Southern		4530		Baggage	Display
Southern		21		Business	Operational
Great Northern		9410		Dome	Operational

=== Freight cars ===
Freight car details
Railroad Company	Operating Number	Car Type	Status
Wilson Car Company	2719	Reefer	Display
Southern	316112	Gondola	Display
DuPont	6516	Tank car	Display

=== Cabooses ===
Passenger car details
Railroad Company	Operating Number	Type	Status
Nashville, Chattanooga and St. Louis	41	Cupola	Stored
Southern	X252	Cupola	Display
Wabash	2774	Cupola	Display
Louisville and Nashville	1236	Bay window	Display

=== Other ===
Details
Railroad Company	Operating Number	type	Status
Southern	903008	Crane	Operaitonal

== TVRM in the movies ==
Equipment and locations owned by the TVRM have been utilized in film and television productions since the 1970s. The museum's collection includes the Pullman sleeping car "Clover Colony", which was featured in the 1959 film Some Like It Hot prior to its acquisition by the museum.

A partial list of movies and music videos shot with TVRM equipment follows:

- Fools' Parade (1971) (Southern 4501 as B&O 4501)
- Eleanor & Franklin (1976), starring Jane Alexander and Edward Herrmann
- The Last Days of Frank and Jesse James (1986)
- Fled (1996) (shot on the TVRM mainline)
- Mama Flora's Family (1998)
- October Sky (1999) (Southern 4501 appearing as N&W 4501 with O. Winston Link being the engineer)
- The Adventures of Ociee Nash (2003)
- Warm Springs (2005) (shot in Summerville, Georgia, using TVRM equipment)
- Leatherheads (2008), starring George Clooney and Renée Zellweger (TVRM 610 disguised as a Chicago and North Western Railway locomotive)
- Water for Elephants (2011), starring Reese Witherspoon and Robert Pattinson (TVRM 610 disguised as a Southern Pacific locomotive)
- The music video for Josh Turner's 2003 country music hit single "Long Black Train" was shot on TVRM property as well.
- The music video for Eric Church song "Creepin'" (2012) was filmed on TVRM property.
- 42 (film) (2013), starring Chadwick Boseman and Harrison Ford Jackie Robinson leaves for the Montreal Royals, a minor league single-A division club under the ownership of the Brooklyn Dodgers, from the Tennessee Valley Railroad Museum's main station. Southern 630 also made an appearance in this movie but with a different number.

== See also ==
- List of heritage railroads in the United States

== Bibliography ==
- Coniglio, John (2025). Steam in the Valley: A history of the Tennessee Valley Railroad Museum Volume 1, 1961-1998 (3rd ed.). Tennessee Valley Railroad Museum. LCCN 97-70709.
