= Southern Railway 722 =

Preserved American 2-8-0 locomotive (SOU Ks-1 class)

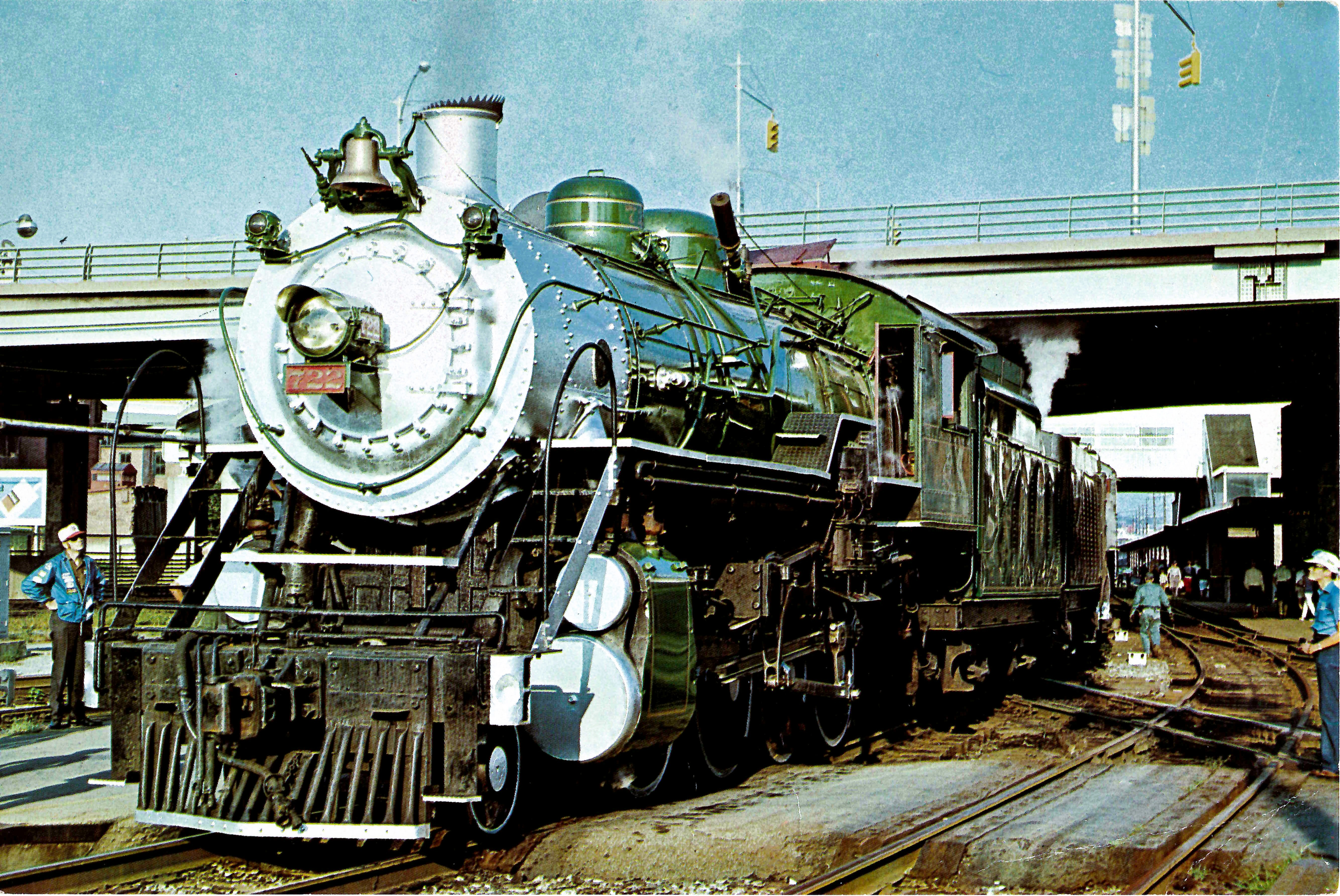
- Southern Railway 722 waiting to depart Roanoke, Virginia, with a doubleheader excursion in front of Savannah and Atlanta 750, on August 28, 1971
Type and origin
- Power type: Steam
- Builder: Baldwin Locomotive Works
- Serial number: 24729
- Build date: September 1904
- Rebuilder: Southern Railway
- Rebuild date: 1918
Specifications
- Configuration
  - Whyte: 2-8-0
- Gauge: 4 ft 8 1/2 in (1,435 mm)
- Driver dia.: 56 in (1.422 m)
- Loco weight: 214,000 lb (97,000 kg)
- Fuel type: New: Coal; Now: Oil (Post-current restoration)
- Fuel capacity: Old tender: 16 t (16 long tons; 18 short tons)
- Water cap.: Old tender: 7,500 US gal (28,000 L; 6,200 imp gal); New tender: 10,000 US gal (38,000 L; 8,300 imp gal)
- Boiler pressure: 190 psi (1.31 MPa), formerly 200 psi (1.38 MPa)
- Cylinders: Two, outside
- Cylinder size: 24 in × 30 in (610 mm × 762 mm) bore x stroke
- Valve gear: New: Walschaerts; Now: Southern
- Valve type: Piston valves
- Loco brake: Air
- Train brakes: Air
- Couplers: Knuckle
Performance figures
- Tractive effort: 46,700 lbf (207.73 kN), formerly 44,100 lbf (196.17 kN)
Career
- Operators: Southern Railway; East Tennessee and Western North Carolina Railroad; Tennessee Valley Railroad Museum
- Class: Ks-1
- Numbers: SOU 722; ET&WNC 208
- Retired: August 1952 (1st revenue service); December 8, 1967 (2nd revenue service); November 1985 (1st excursion servce)
- Restored: November 1952 (1st revenue service); August 1970 (1st excursion service)
- Current owner: Great Smoky Mountains Railroad
- Disposition: Undergoing restoration to operating condition

Southern Railway 722 is a 2-8-0 "Consolidation" type steam locomotive, built in September 1904 by the Baldwin Locomotive Works (BLW), originally as a member of the K class for the Southern Railway (SOU). It was significantly modified with superheaters and larger cylinders during the 1910s-20s, being re-classified as a Ks-1 type. The locomotive ran on the Murphy Branch, hauling freight trains between Asheville and Murphy, North Carolina for the SOU until its retirement in 1952. That same year, No. 722 was purchased by the East Tennessee and Western North Carolina Railroad (ET&WNC), alongside fellow Ks-1 locomotive No. 630, where they were served as switchers around Johnson City and Elizabethton, Tennessee.

In 1967, Nos. 722 and 630 were both traded back to the SOU for use in their steam excursion program. Being repainted in SOU's passenger Sylvan green and gold paint scheme, No. 722 hauled mainline excursion trains until being sent alongside No. 630 to the Tennessee Valley Railroad Museum (TVRM) in Chattanooga, Tennessee to make way for larger steam locomotives haul the longer and heavier excursions around the early 1980s. Taken out of service in late 1985, No. 722 was purchased by the Great Smoky Mountains Railroad (GSMR) in late 2000 to be restored back to operating condition. The restoration work was halted around 2005 due to circumstances but continued in 2023, anticipated to be completed around 2027.

== History ==
=== Revenue service and upgrades ===
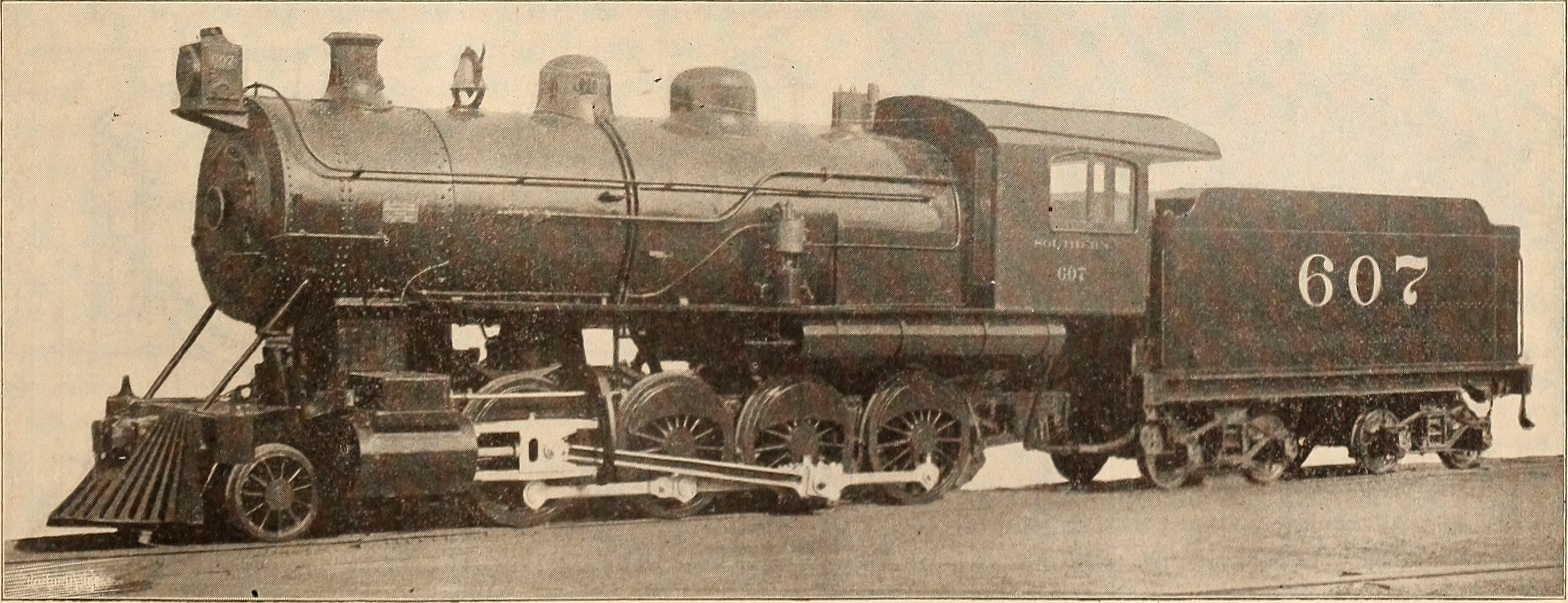
Builder's photograph of fellow K class locomotive No. 607 in November 1903

No. 722 was built in September 1904 by Baldwin Locomotive Works (BLW) for the Southern Railway (SOU), originally as a K class 2-8-0 "Consolidation" type with Walschaerts valve gear, sliding valves, 22 in × 30 in (559 mm × 762 mm) cylinders, double-guide alligator crossheads, and a saturated boiler. It was standardized with 56 in (1.422 m) driving wheels and a boiler pressure of 200 psi (1.38 MPa), making the locomotive produce 44,100 lbf (196.17 kN) of tractive effort. No. 722 was delivered with a smaller tender, which holds 12.5 tonnes (28,000 lb) of coal and 6,000 US gallons (23,000 L) of water. It was primarily assigned to work on SOU's Murphy Branch, where it was used to haul freight trains between Asheville and Murphy, North Carolina. Sometime during 1907, the locomotive swapped out its original tender with a slightly larger one, which holds 12 tonnes (26,000 lb) of coal and 7,500 US gallons (28,000 L) of water.

In the 1910s, No. 722 was upgraded with Southern valve gear and superheaters, which reclassified the locomotive as a Ks type. In the 1920s, it was upgraded again with larger 24 in × 30 in (610 mm × 762 mm) piston valves cylinders with the boiler pressure dropped to prevent the locomotive from wheel slipping with the new cylinders. These upgrades made No. 722 produce 46,700 lbf (207.73 kN) of tractive effort and reclassified again as a Ks-1 type. (Note: Other Ks locomotives were re-equipped with slightly larger 25 in × 30 in (635 mm × 762 mm) cylinders and had their boiler pressure dropped to 175 psi (1.21 MPa), which reclassified them as Ks-2s.) In the 1930s, the locomotive was upgraded with an air power reverse gear, a dynamo generator, a new steel cab and pilot. Its tender was also modified with coal boards, increasing the fuel capacity to 14 tonnes (31,000 lb).

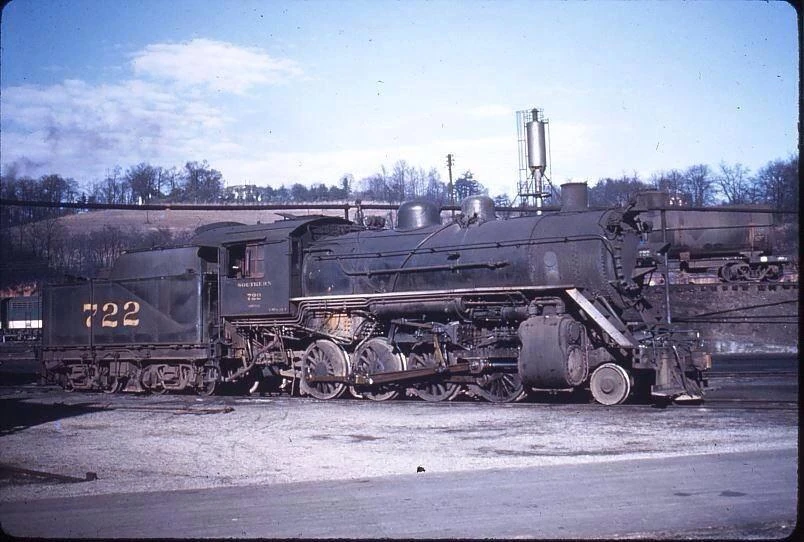
No. 722 idling at the Asheville Yard in March 1950

During the early 1940s, No. 722 was re-equipped with single-guide multiple-bearing crossheads for greater surface area to slide back and forth when the locomotive was in motion. This was also made to receive less fouling from cinders and debris unlike the alligator type, which was prone to do that. No. 722's tender was also modified again with the coal boards superseded by slightly faired sheet metal extensions, doubling the height of the bunker collar, and increasing the fuel capacity again to 16 tonnes (35,000 lb). Sometime after 1948, the tender's bunker collar was completely cut off and replaced with a much taller, offset one, welded in its place. This was made to improve the locomotive crew's view rearward to observe hand signals from crew members on the ground. Additionally, No. 722 had its road pilot swapped out with a road switcher footboard pilot since it frequently does switching work around SOU's Asheville Yard.

In August 1952, No. 722 was retired from revenue service after it pulled the last steam-powered freight train on the Murphy Branch. Its revenue duties were taken over by SOU's new fleet of EMD F7s and GP7s. Three months later, East Tennessee and Western North Carolina Railroad (ET&WNC) superintendent Clarence Hobbs purchased No. 722 and fellow Ks-1 class locomotive No. 630 to serve as switchers in Johnson City and Elizabethton, Tennessee for the ET&WNC. (Note: Hobbs originally wanted to buy Ks-1 No. 685 (Baldwin, 1904) and Ks-2 No. 835 (Baldwin, 1906), but the SOU Asheville Master Mechanic offered Nos. 630 and 722 due to the formers being stored outside in dilapidated condition.) After the acquirement, Nos. 722 and 630 were renumbered to Nos. 208 and 207, respectively, while their tender bunker collars were cut down to give the engineer a clear view during numerous switching moves and reverse operation. In 1962, No. 208 traveled to Knoxville, Tennessee, where it was filmed in a cameo appearance for the 1963 film All the Way Home.

=== First excursion service ===
On December 8, 1967, Nos. 208 and 207 were both traded back to the SOU for use in their steam excursion program in return for a pair of former Central of Georgia (CG) ALCO RS-3s, under the leadership of president W. Graham Claytor Jr. In Claytor's vision, he requested SOU Master Mechanic Bill Purdie to have one Ks-1 locomotive retain its freight black paint livery and the other being repainted in SOU's passenger Sylvan green paint scheme to match the fellow excursion locomotive No. 4501. While the two Ks-1 locomotives were being inspected by Purdie at SOU's Norris Yard Steam Shop in Irondale, Alabama, No. 208 was in poor condition with a cracked firebox, while No. 207 was in better condition and had been given minor repairs. The latter was renumbered back to 630, retained its black paint, and began excursion service in late February 1968. No. 208 had its firebox repaired, renumbered back to 722, and repainted in sylvan green with gold linings. It made its first public excursion debut in September 1970 with Nos. 630 and 4501 for the Charleston Chapter of the National Railway Historical Society (NRHS) convention in Charleston, South Carolina. (Note: Also participating in the event was SOU's replica of the Best Friend of Charleston and the Charleston Chapter's ex-Hampton and Branchville 4-6-0 No. 44.) For the steam program, No. 722 was initially based in Birmingham, Alabama on SOU's Birmingham Division. Both Ks-1 locomotives had their tender bunker collars restored.

On March 27, 1971, No. 722 double headed with ex-Savannah and Atlanta (S&A) Light Pacific 4-6-2 No. 750 to haul the combined Walter C. Dove/Heart of Dixie Special excursions between Birmingham and Akron, Alabama with a brief stop in Moundville, Alabama for passengers to visit the Mound State Monument. At Akron, the excursion consist was split up with No. 750 hauling nine of the Heart of Dixie Railroad Club excursion cars back to Birmingham while No. 722 hauled the seven cars of the Walter C. Dove Homecoming Special excursion down to Meridian, Mississippi for the night. (Note: No. 4501 was meant to pull the Walter C. Dove Homecoming Special excursion but was out of service for major repairs.) The engineer running No. 722 during that time is Walter C. Dove, who was a former SOU road foreman of engines and a Meridian native. The next day, No. 722 hauled the Walter C. Dove Homecoming Special excursion all the way down to New Orleans, Louisiana, where it arrived at the New Orleans Union Passenger Terminal (NOUPT). This would be the first time steam power was present at NOUPT since the mid-1950s. On April 3 and 4, the locomotive hauled round-trip excursions between New Orleans and Hattiesburg, Mississippi, where Dove was honored with a 50 years of service certificate presented by Claytor. Afterwards, on April 10, No. 722 left New Orleans and returned to Birmingham the next day to idle.

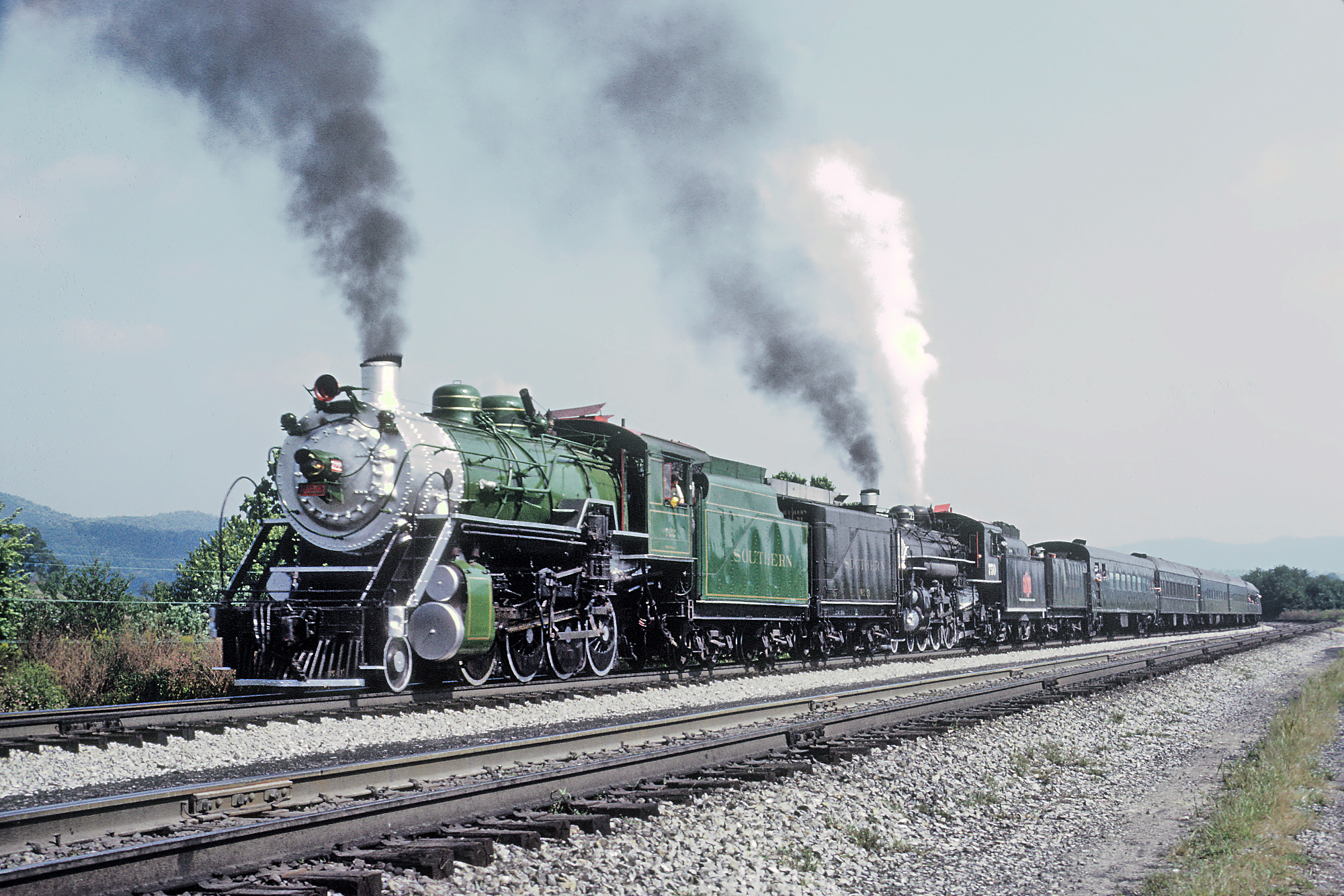
Nos. 722 and 750 double heading the Virginian loop trip excursion through Montvale, Virginia on August 28, 1971

On June 12, 1971, No. 722 traveled to Atlanta, Georgia, where it double headed with No. 750 with the Georgia Peach Special round-trip excursion between there and Macon, Georgia on July 4 that year. On August 7, Nos. 722 and 750 were both volunteered to pull the Tennessee Valley Railroad Museum's (TVRM) TAG Steam Special excursion from Chattanooga, Tennessee to Gadsden, Alabama via ex-Tennessee, Alabama and Georgia (TAG) rails and then Alabama Great Southern (AGS) rails for the return trip. Afterwards, the next day, both locomotives traveled to Knoxville, Tennessee, to haul a round-trip excursion between there and Asheville on August 14. The next journey was to Roanoke, Virginia, where they haul the Virginian loop trip excursion via Altavista, Virginia on ex-Virginian (VGN) rails and Lynchburg and Bedford, Virginia on SOU and Norfolk and Western (N&W) trackage on August 28. The next day, Nos. 722 and 750 went to Richmond, Virginia, where they both haul a round-trip excursion between there and Keysville, Virginia on September 11 and 12.

On September 13, the two locomotives went to Alexandria, Virginia to haul round-trip excursions between there and Front Royal, Virginia on October 2 and 3. On October 9-10, Nos. 722 and 750 hauled the longest one-way excursion trip from Alexandria to Atlanta on SOU's Washington, D.C.-Atlanta mainline, also known as the recreation of the Washington & Southwestern Vestibuled Limited, a predecessor passenger train of SOU's Crescent. On October 16 and 17, the two locomotives hauled round-trip excursions between Chattanooga and Crossville, Tennessee on former Tennessee Central (TC) rails. During April 15 and 16, 1972, No. 722 hauled round-trip excursions between Atlanta and Gainesville, Georgia. In late August 1973, Nos. 722 and 4501, traveled to New Orleans, Louisiana, where both locomotives haul an NRHS sponsored round-trip excursion between there and Pascagoula, Mississippi on Louisville and Nashville (L&N) trackage in the Mississippi Gulf Coast region on September 2 that year. This was made hours before Hurricane Delia occurred. No. 722 also hauled two round-trip excursions between New Orleans and Slidell, Louisiana the next day.

In the spring of 1977, No. 722 idled in front of the Norris Yard Steam Shop and was photographed alongside No. 4501, Texas and Pacific (T&P) No. 610, and Southern Pacific (SP) No. 4449. SOU began leasing No. 610, along with Canadian Pacific (CP) No. 2839 later on, since their excursion consists were becoming longer and heavier, and the railway consequently began to diminish their usage of No. 722, while No. 630 would be retired from the program altogether. Both Ks-1 locomotives could only manage to pull 10 cars at 40 mph (64 km/h). In May 1979, SOU briefly leased No. 722, along with its auxiliary tender, to the Wilmington and Western Railroad (WWRC) to operate over their Wilmington and Northern Branch line in Wilmington, Delaware. It also hauled one excursion to Coatesville, Pennsylvania. In August of that year, No. 722 hauled a series of excursions throughout Virginia. On August 31, No. 722 participated in that year's NRHS Capital Limited Convention held in Washington, D.C., leading an excursion between Alexandria, Manassas and Strasburg, and then it attended a night photo session with No. 2839 in Alexandria. No. 750 was initially planned to join No. 722 on the excursion for a doubleheader, but its overhaul at the time held it back, and two EMD FP7 diesels filled in. In August 1980, as SOU was partially downsizing their steam excursion fleet, No. 722 hauled its final excursions for the program throughout Virginia and North Carolina, and then it deadheaded to Irondale for storage.

In early 1984, SOU leased No. 722 to the Tennessee Valley Railroad Museum (TVRM) in Chattanooga, Tennessee, where it joined No. 630 in pulling the short-mileage Missionary Ridge Local excursions between TVRM's Grand Junction Station and East Chattanooga Yard. In late October that year, the locomotive finally doubled-headed with No. 630 on the Missionary Ridge Local for the passengers who were riding behind ex-Norfolk and Western (N&W) 4-8-4 No. 611 pulling a mainline excursion enroute from Atlanta to Chattanooga to see the two Ks-1 locomotives at TVRM's Grand Junction Station. In November 1985, No. 722 was retired due to its boiler flue time expired and sat on display at TVRM. On October 8 and 9, 1992, Nos. 722, 630, and 4501 were all photographed at TVRM's East Chattanooga yard, before Southern's successor, Norfolk Southern (NS), presented No. 722 to the Asheville Chapter of the NRHS in Asheville, North Carolina to be on display at the city's Biltmore section. In December 1999, NS sold the Biltmore property for redevelopment and removed No. 722 from its display site to the Asheville roundhouse for storage.

=== Restoration ===
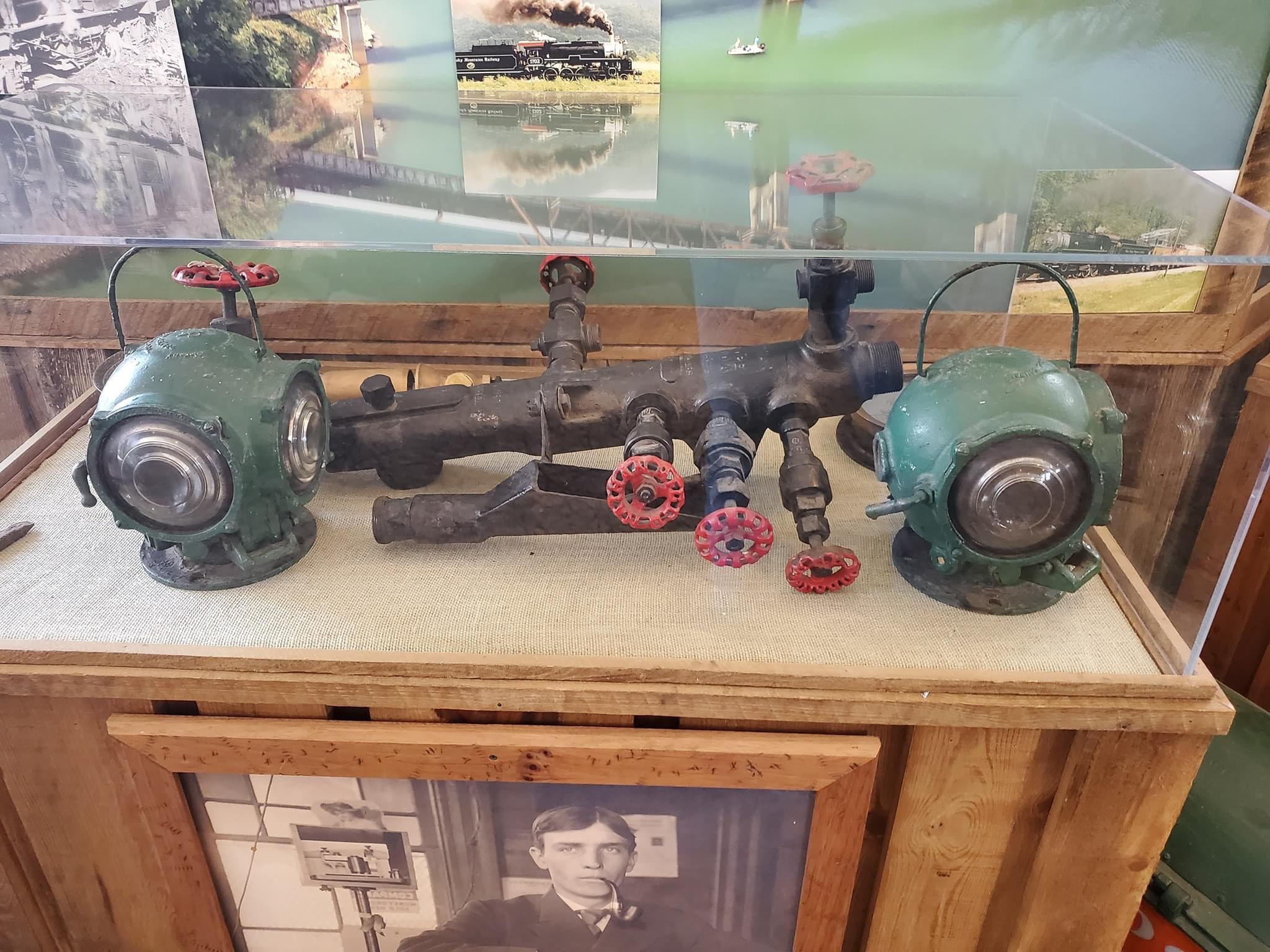
No. 722's classification lights and try cock valves on display at the Swain County Heritage Museum in 2014

In December 2000, the Great Smoky Mountains Railroad (GSMR), which operates a part of the same Murphy Branch where No. 722 was used in revenue service, purchased the locomotive with the hopes of restoring it to operating condition. However, when No. 722 was being disassembled for restoration work, the plans were halted around 2005 due to GSMR's other steam locomotive ex-U.S. Army No. 1702 going out of service, leaving them both remaining disassembled outside the GSMR's workshop area in Dillsboro, North Carolina, exposed to the elements.

In 2012, GSMR announced their plan to restore both Nos. 1702 and 722 to operating condition with the restoration cost estimated at $700,000 for each locomotives. In 2017, a year after No. 1702 was restored back to service, GSMR stated that they put the restoration work of No. 722 on hold, but were still determined to restore it back to operating condition. In late May 2023, GSMR announced that the restoration work of the No. 722 locomotive had continued, anticipated to be completed by 2026. Additionally, No. 722 will be converted from burning coal to oil fuel and will eventually retain its 1970s SOU Sylvan green excursion paint scheme once the restoration work is finished. In September 2023, the boiler, driving wheels, and driving boxes were all shipped to the Strasburg Rail Road (SRC) in Strasburg, Pennsylvania for repairs and refurbishment.

Throughout 2024 and 2025, restoration work progressed with extensive disassembly and rebuilding of major components. The locomotive's frame was sandblasted and inspected to assess its structural condition, with necessary repairs and alignment work carried out. The driving wheels, running gear, and associated components underwent machining and refurbishment, while the boiler continued receiving major repairs, including firebox work and the installation of new staybolts. As of early 2026, restoration efforts have entered the final stages, with the boiler successfully reunited with the frame in February 2026. The locomotive's tender would also be modified with an extended frame and a new water tank capacity of 10,000 US gallons (38,000 L).

== See also ==
- Southern Railway 154
- Southern Railway 385
- Southern Railway 401
- Southern Railway 1401
- W. Graham Claytor Jr.

== Bibliography ==
- Coniglio, John (2025). Steam in the Valley: A history of the Tennessee Valley Railroad Museum Volume 1, 1961-1998 (3rd ed.). Tennessee Valley Railroad Museum. LCCN 97-70709.
- Ferrell, Mallory H. (1991). Tweetsie Country (2nd ed.). The Overmountain Press. ISBN 0-93280758-5.
- Neubauer, James A. (September 1971). "What makes the wheels go round?". Trains. Vol. 31, no. 11. Kalmbach Publishing. pp. 22–27.
- Plott, Jacob; Plott, Bob (2021). Smoky Mountain Railways (1st ed.). The History Press. ISBN 978-1-4671-4459-9.
- Vazquez, Gisela (2008). The Wilmington and Western Railroad. Images of Rail (1st ed.). Arcadia Publishing. ISBN 978-0-7385-5362-7.
- Waite, John R. (2003). Blue Ridge Stemwinder: An Illustrated History of the East Tennessee & Western North Carolina Railroad and the Linville River Railway (1st ed.). Overmountain Press. ISBN 1-57072-272-2.
- Wrinn, Jim (2000). Steam's Camelot: Southern and Norfolk Southern Excursions in Color (1st ed.). TLC Publishing. ISBN 1-883089-56-5.
