= Southern Railway 401 =

Preserved 2-8-0 H-4 class locomotive

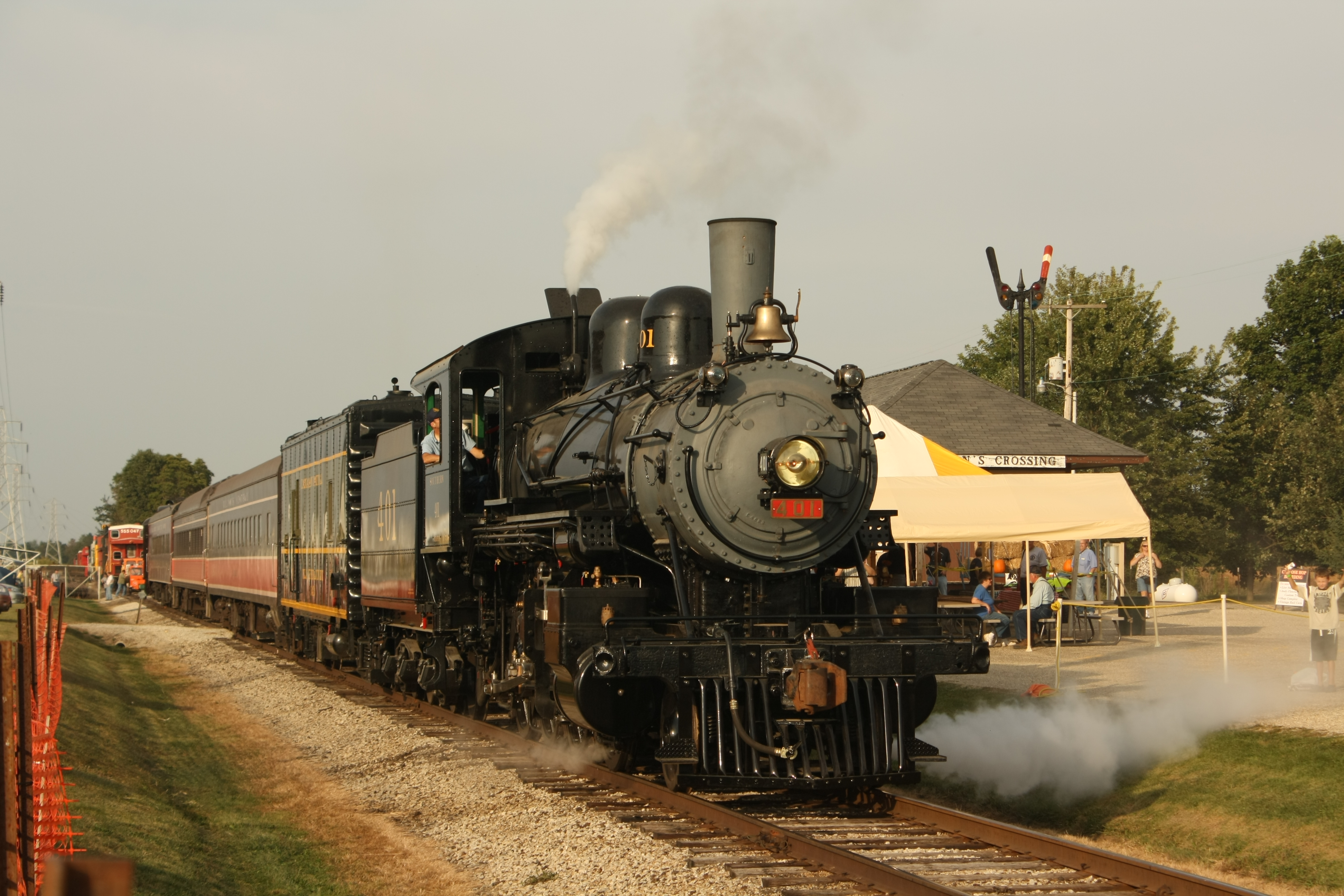
- No. 401 awaiting to haul its first excursion train on its second day returning to steam, September 18, 2010
Type and origin
- Power type: Steam
- Builder: Baldwin Locomotive Works
- Serial number: 32487
- Build date: December 1907
Specifications
- Configuration
  - Whyte: 2-8-0
- Gauge: 4 ft 8 1/2 in (1,435 mm)
- Driver dia.: 57 in (1.448 m)
- Wheelbase: 24 ft 3.5 in (7.404 m)
- Height: 15 ft (4.6 m)
- Adhesive weight: 146,400 lb (66.4 t)
- Loco weight: 164,800 lb (74.8 t)
- Tender weight: 105,900 lb (48.0 t)
- Total weight: 270,700 lb (122.8 t)
- Fuel type: New: Coal; Now: Oil
- Fuel capacity: Coal: 11 t (11 long tons; 12 short tons); Oil: 1,100 US gal (4,164 L)
- Water cap.: 7,200 US gal (27,255 L)
- Tender cap.: Oil: 1,100 US gal (4,164 L); Water: 7,200 US gal (27,255 L)
- Boiler pressure: 200 psi (1.38 MPa)
- Cylinders: Two, outside
- Cylinder size: 21 in × 28 in (533 mm × 711 mm)
- Valve gear: Walschaerts
- Valve type: Piston valves
- Loco brake: Air
- Train brakes: Air
- Couplers: Knuckle
Performance figures
- Tractive effort: 36,827 lbf (163.81 kN)
Career
- Operators: Southern Railway; Alabama Asphalt Limestone Company; Monticello Railway Museum
- Class: H-4
- Numbers: SOU 401
- Nicknames: Memphis
- Retired: 1964
- Restored: September 10, 2010
- Current owner: Monticello Railway Museum
- Disposition: Operational

Southern Railway 401 is a H-4 class 2-8-0 "Consolidation" type steam locomotive, built in 1907 by the Baldwin Locomotive Works (BLW) for the Southern Railway (SOU), it is preserved and operated by the Monticello Railway Museum (MRYM).

== History ==
=== Southern Railway ===
No. 401 is one of 2 surviving 25 H-4 class 2-8-0 "Consolidation" type steam locomotives, the other being Southern Railway 385 in the Whippany Railway Museum. No. 401 was built by the Baldwin Locomotive Works (BLW) of Philadelphia, Pennsylvania in December 1907 for the Southern Railway (SOU). The H-4 class was generally used in mixed train service, to haul branch line freight trains, and later, as yard switchers.

=== Alabama Asphalt Limestone Company ===
In 1949 No. 401 was retired by the SOU and sold to the Alabama Asphaltic Limestone Company in Margerum, Alabama, where it was used as a switcher engine for several years, moving hopper cars of stone for the company. In 1964, No. 401 was retired from revenue service and was placed in outdoor storage. It was later purchased by the Society for the Perpetuation of Unretired Railfans (SPUR) in September 1967.

=== Monticello Railway Museum ===
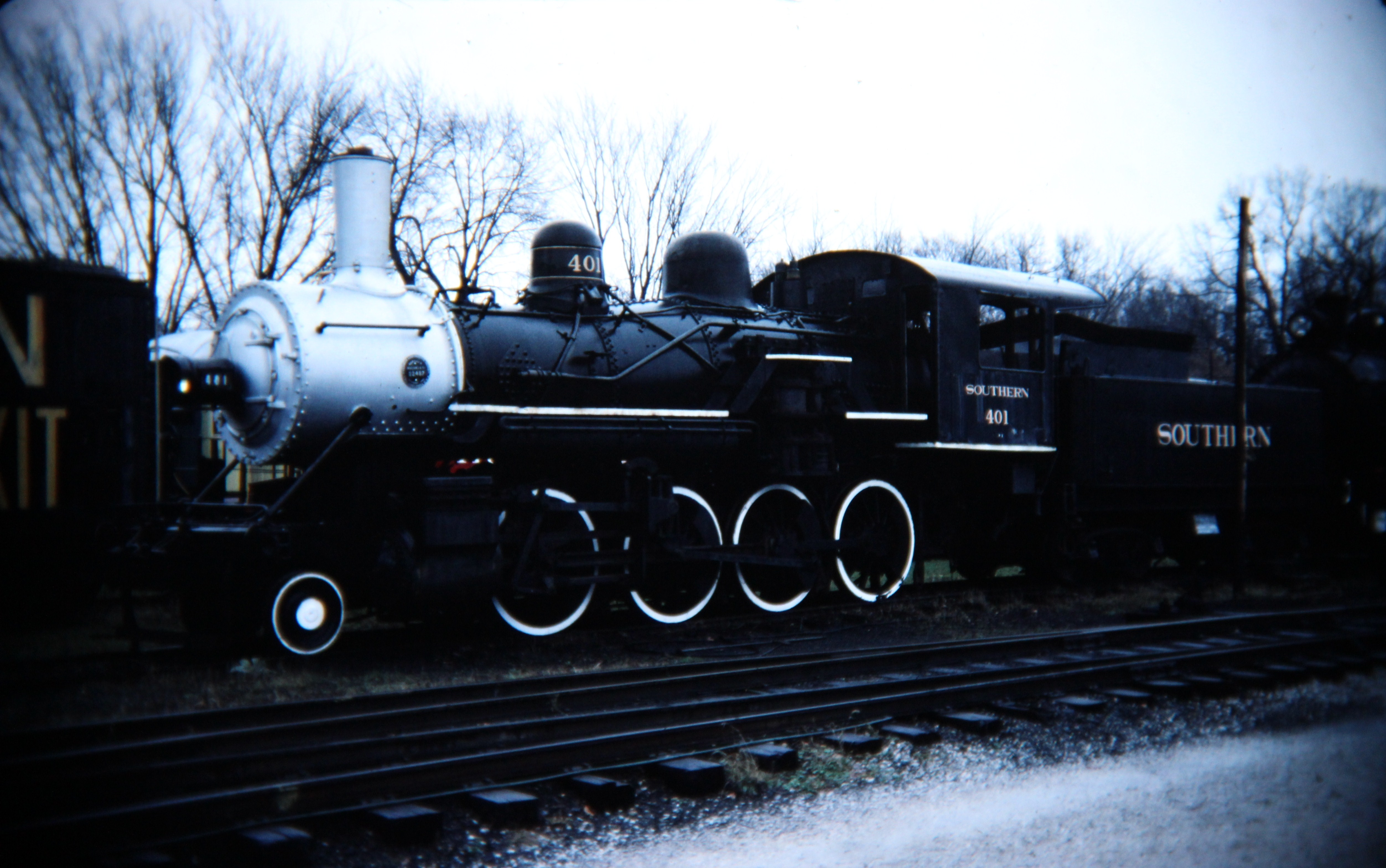
No. 401 on display at the Monticello Railway Museum in November 1985

In January 1968, the locomotive was loaded on a flat car by two Southern Railway steam cranes and shipped to Decatur, Illinois. The No. 401 was unloaded from the flat car in the Norfolk & Western's former Wabash Ry Decatur Shops and set back on its own wheels, then it was stored in the Decatur Yards.

SPUR purchased grounds from the Illinois Terminal Railroad near Monticello, Illinois for its museum and demonstration railroad in February 1970. The name of the organization was changed to Monticello & Sangamon Valley Railway Historical Society (M&SV) to reflect its location near Monticello and the Sangamon River Valley. M&SV had its Monticello site developed enough to receive the No. 401 and other stored railroad equipment in October 1971 and the No. 401 was moved on its own wheels to the museum. It was cosmetically restored and placed on display at the museum from 1971 to 1995. M&SV changed its name again to the Monticello Railway Museum (MRYM) in November 1984.

In 1995, a donor stepped forward with plans to return an operating steam locomotive to service at the museum, after considering several alternative steam locomotive candidates for restoration, it was decided to return No. 401 to operating condition. No. 401's restoration officially began in 1995 by museum volunteers, with work taking fifteen years to complete, included replacing the boiler and tender, the engine would also be converted to burn oil instead of coal. On September 10, 2010, No. 401 moved under steam for the first time in forty-six years, it would later operate its first excursion run for the annual Railroad Days event eight days later.

In 2020, No. 401 would be taken out of service for its Federal Railroad Administration (FRA) 1,472-day inspection and overhaul. It returned service for the 2022 operating season.
