= Richmond Locomotive Works =

US railroad manufacture (1887–1901)

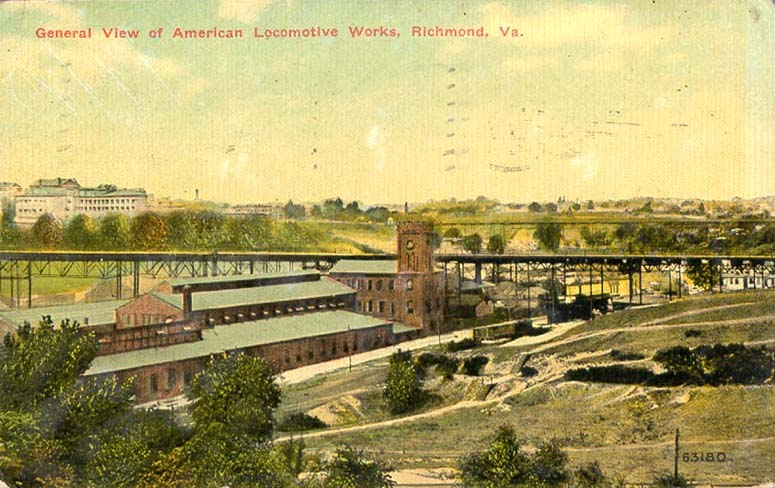
- Richmond Locomotive Works in 1911, after merger with ALCO
- Industry: Rail transport
- Founded: 1887
- Founders: William E. Tanner
- Defunct: 1901
- Fate: Merged
- Successor: American Locomotive Company
- Headquarters: Richmond, Virginia, United States
- Products: Steam locomotives

Richmond Locomotive Works was a steam locomotive manufacturing firm located in Richmond, Virginia.

It began operation in 1887, and produced upward of 4,500 engines during its 40 years of operation. The Richmond Locomotive Works was the largest and most significant manufacturer of locomotives in Virginia during its years of production. Its only contemporary in Virginia was the Roanoke Shops, which produced locomotives exclusively for Norfolk & Western. In 1901 the works merged with several others to form the American Locomotive Company, which continued production at the Richmond works until 1927.

Among the locomotives Richmond produced was locomotive H2 293 for the Finnish State Railways, the locomotive that pulled Lenin's train into Petrograd on the last leg of his return from exile during the Russian Revolution of 1917, and Southern Railway 1401, which pulled President Franklin D. Roosevelt's Funeral Train.

== History ==
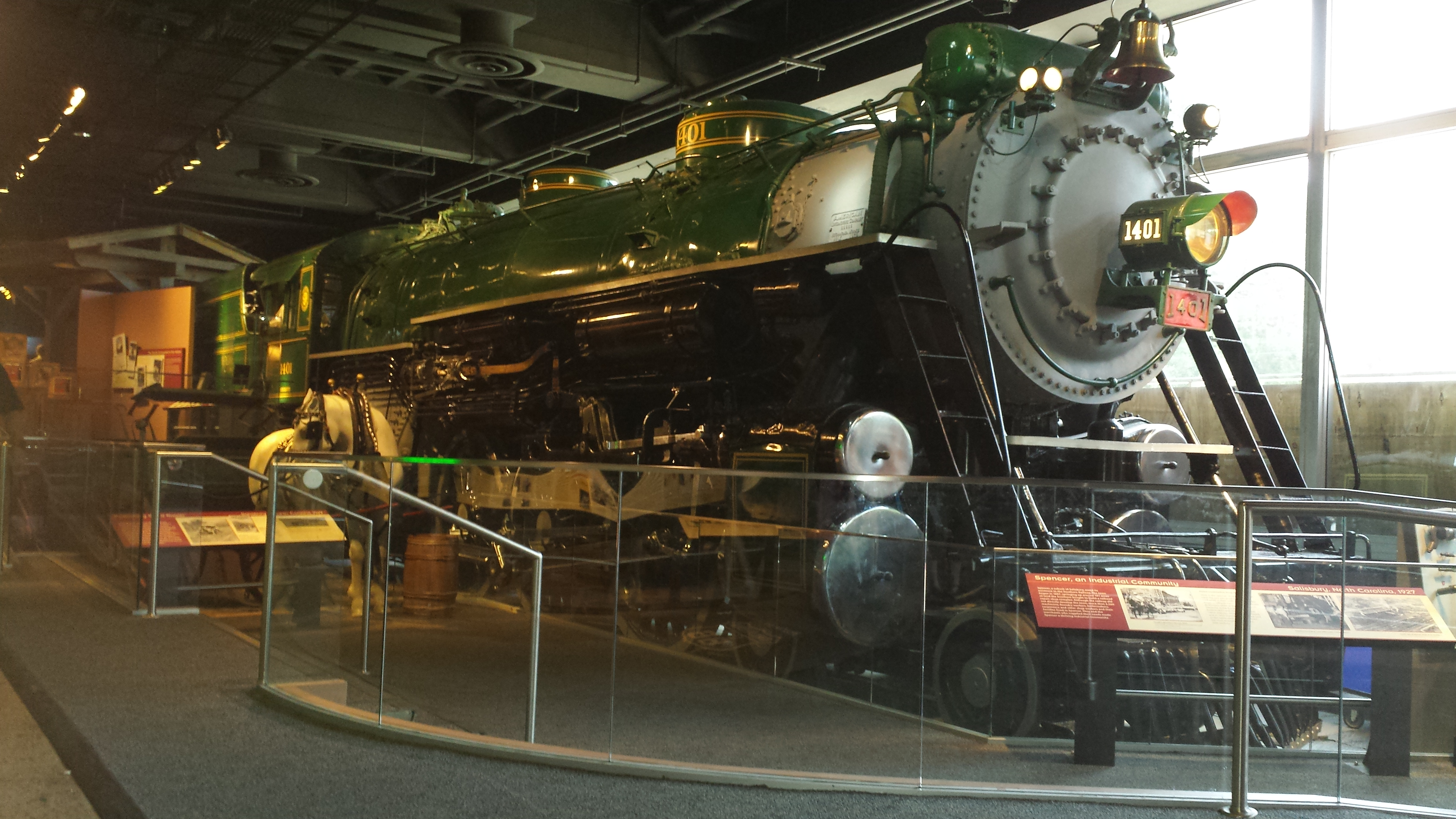
Built at American Locomotive Company's Richmond works in 1926, Southern Railway 1401 seen in the National Museum of American History in Washington, D.C.

The Richmond Locomotive Works grew out of Tredegar Iron Works to become a nationally known manufacturer of steam locomotive engines and an integral part of the industrial landscape of the city of Richmond. The engines it produced were shipped across America, as well as several countries in Europe, Asia and the South Pacific. It was owned by Joseph Bryan, whose son Jonathan Bryan was also involved in its operations. At its height, the firm had more than 3,000 employees and made 200 locomotives a year.

Most Richmond Locomotive engines were sold to Southern carriers. Many were sold to Virginia lines, including Richmond City Railway, as well as the Richmond, Fredericksburg and Potomac Railroad, the Richmond and Danville Railroad and the Seaboard Air Line. Other buyers included the Louisville and Nashville Railroad; the Louisville Southern Railway; the Wilmington, Onslow and East Carolina Railroad; the Raleigh and Cape Fear Railway; the Nashville and Tellico Railroad; the Atlanta and Florida Railroad; the Georgia Pacific Railway; the Florida Central and Peninsular Railroad; the Savannah, Americus and Montgomery Railway; the Southern Railroad; the New Orleans and Northeastern Railroad; the Mississippi River and Bonne Terre Railway; the Vicksburg, Shreveport and Pacific Railroad; and the Little Rock and Hot Spring Western Railroad. Richmond locomotives were delivered as far away as the Southwestern Arkansas and Indian Territory Railroad and the Alameda and San Joaquin Railroad, Atchison, Topeka & Santa Fe; the Seattle, Lake Shore and Eastern Railway; the Rio Grande and Western Railroad; the San Francisco and North Pacific Railroad; and the California and Northeastern Railway.

Richmond locomotives also had a significant market in the Midwest as well. Midwestern purchasers included the Cleveland, Cincinnati, Chicago and St. Louis Railway; the Cincinnati, Richmond and Muncie Railroad; the Baltimore and Ohio Railroad; the Wabash Railroad; the Chicago Great Western Railway; the Brainerd and Northern Minnesota Railway; the Elgin, Joliet and Eastern Railway; and the Chicago and Western Indiana Railroad. The Chesapeake and Ohio Railway purchased several engines, including two specifically constructed for carrying passengers to the 1893 Chicago World's Fair.

One 4-6-0 locomotive was shipped to New Zealand in 1901 as a sample for the New Zealand Railways to try. It was classed in the 'Ub' family (along with a fellow ALCO product - a Brooks 4-6-0) and given the road number of #371. It was considered too light for mainline running, steaming poorly on New Zealand's ungraded coals but found a home on a local Canterbury Plains branchline serving it for 30 years. It was dumped in 1933 but has been rediscovered for possible restoration.

=== Sale and merger ===
In 1901, the Richmond Locomotive Works was purchased by Joseph Leiter for $3 million. At the time, the company employed about 1,600 workers and was producing two locomotives a day.

Later that year, Richmond and seven other manufacturing companies merged to form American Locomotive Company (ALCO). Locomotive production at Richmond Locomotive Works ceased in September 1927.

== Preserved Richmond locomotives ==
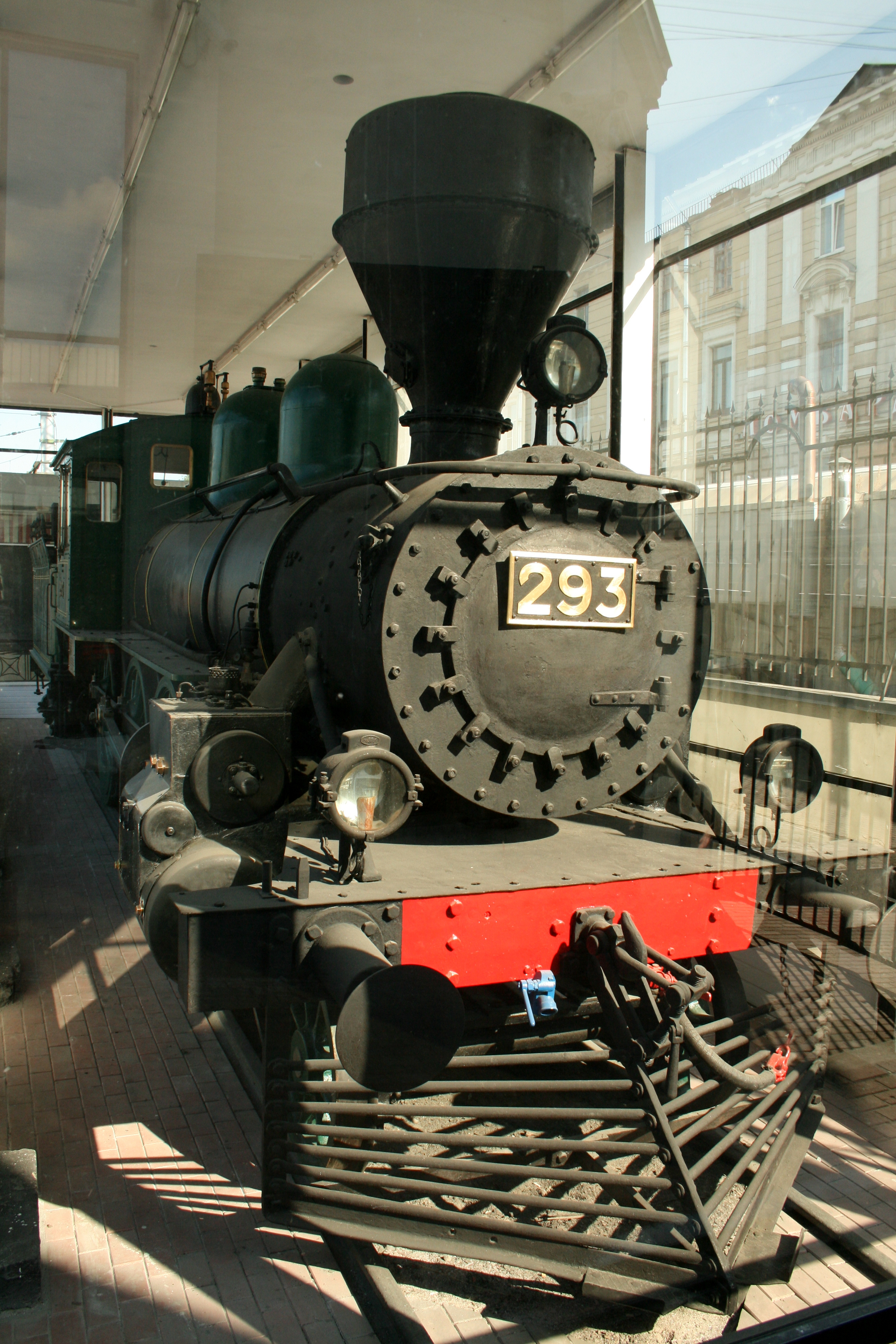
Finnish class Hk1 No 293 locomotive built by Richmond Locomotive Works preserved at the Finland Station, St.Petersburg, Russia. This was the locomotive that carried Lenin to Petrograd on the last leg of his return from exile, accelerating the Russian Revolution of 1917.

The following locomotives (in serial number order) built by Richmond before the ALCO merger have been preserved. All locations are in the United States unless otherwise noted.

Serial number	Wheel arrangement (Whyte notation)	Build date	Operational owner(s)	Disposition
2957	2-8-0	1900	Santa Fe 769	Old Coal Mine Museum, Madrid, New Mexico
2991	4-6-0	1900	Finnish Railways 293	Finland Station, St-Petersburg, Russia

The following preserved Richmond locomotives were built post-merger:

Serial number	Wheel arrangement (Whyte notation)	Build date	Operational owner(s)	Disposition
28446	2-8-0	1904	Southern Railway 630	Tennessee Valley Railroad Museum, Chattanooga, Tennessee
N/A	2-6-4T	1907	China Railway DB1-28	Shenyang Railway Museum, Shenyang, China
46831	4-6-2	1910	Norfolk and Western 578	Ohio Railway Museum, Worthington, Ohio
59314	4-6-2	1919	Atlantic Coast Line 1504	U.S. Sugar, Clewiston, Florida
61769	4-6-2	1920	Florida East Coast Railway 148	U.S. Sugar, Clewiston, Florida
63262	4-6-2	1922	Florida East Coast Railway 153	Gold Coast Railroad Museum, Miami, Florida
64070	2-8-8-2	1923	Norfolk and Western 2050	Illinois Railway Museum, Union, Illinois
66555	4-6-4	1926	Chesapeake and Ohio 490	B&O Railroad Museum, Baltimore, Maryland
66888	4-6-2	1926	Southern Railway 1401	Smithsonian Institution, Washington, D.C.

== Notes ==
1. Sunshine Software, Steam Locomotive Information. Retrieved October 4, 2005.
