= Joseph Bryan (disambiguation) =

Joseph Bryan (1773–1812) was a United States representative from Georgia.

Joseph Bryan may also refer to:

- Joseph Bryan (publisher), American publisher and industrialist from Richmond, Virginia
- Joseph Hunter Bryan (1782–1839), United States representative from North Carolina
- Joseph M. Bryan (1896–1995), American businessman and philanthropist
- Joe Bryan (born 1993), English professional footballer
