= Chicago and North Western J class =

Class of American 2-8-2 locomotives

C&NW class J Omaha Road class J
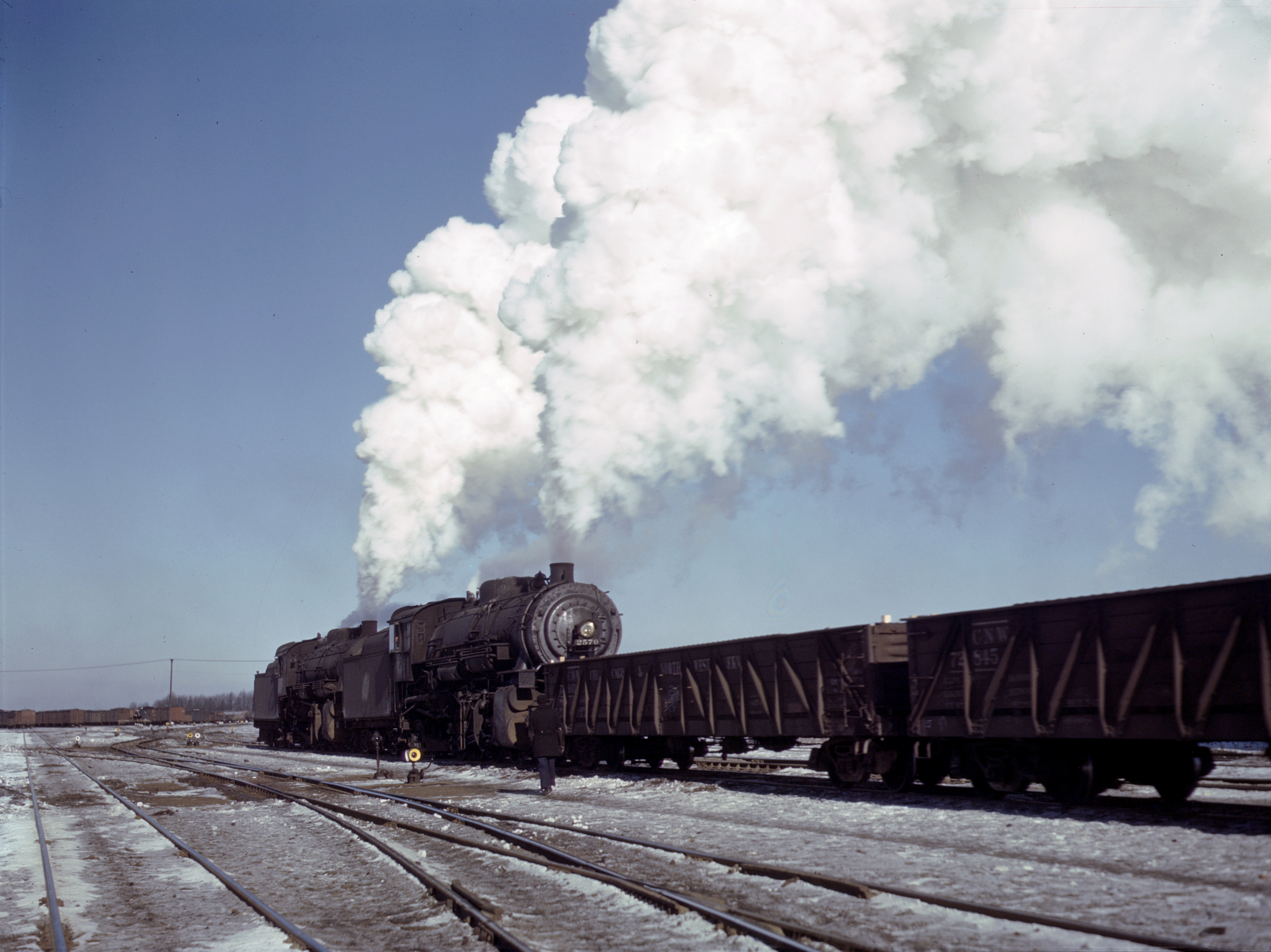
- No. 2570 and another locomotive in a rail yard in the early 1940s
Type and origin
- Power type: Steam
- Builder: American Locomotive Company
- Serial number: see table
- Build date: 1913–1923
- Total produced: CNW: 310; CMO: 32
Specifications
- Configuration
  - Whyte: 2-8-2
  - UIC: 1′D1′ h2
- Gauge: 1,435 mm (4 ft 8 1/2 in)
- Driver dia.: J: 61 in (1.549 m); J-A: 64 in (1.626 m)
- Loco weight: 309,500–314,000 lb (140,400–142,400 kg)
- Total weight: 467,500 lb (212,100 kg)
- Boiler pressure: J: 185 lbf/in^{2} (1.28 MPa); J-A: 200 lbf/in^{2} (1.4 MPa)
- Cylinders: Two
- Cylinder size: 27 in × 32 in (690 mm × 810 mm)
- Valve gear: Baker or Young
- Valve type: Piston
Career
- Operators: Chicago and North Western Railway; Omaha Road
- Number in class: CNW: 310 (-2); CMO 32 (+2)
- Numbers: CNW: 2301–2600, 2701–2710; CMO: 390–423, 440–441
- Disposition: All scrapped

The Chicago and North Western Railway class J was a class of 310 American 2-8-2 locomotives. They were built between 1913 and 1923 by the American Locomotive Company. In addition, the Chicago, St. Paul, Minneapolis and Omaha Railway (the Omaha Road) acquired 32, and also classified them as class J.

== Design ==
The locomotives had boiler pressed to 185 pounds per square inch (1.28 MPa) feeding steam to two cylinders that had a 27-inch (690 mm) bore and a 32-inch (810 mm) stroke. These were connected to 61-inch (1,500 mm) driving wheels. The locomotives weighed 467,500 pounds (212,100 kg).

The first 224 locomotives, built 1913 to 1919 had Baker valve gear, the last 118, built 1921 to 1923 had Young valve gear.

== Construction ==
The locomotives were built by the American Locomotive Company at their Schenectady, Richmond, and Dunkirk, plants.

Table of orders and numbers
| Year | Quantity | Manufacturer | Serial numbers | C&NW numbers | Notes |
|---|---|---|---|---|---|
| 1913 | 10 | Schenectady | 52697–52706 | 390–399 | Omaha Road |
| 1913 | 15 | Schenectady | 53094–53108 | 2301–2315 | |
| 1914 | 20 | Schenectady | 54429–54448 | 2316–2335 | |
| 1914 | 6 | Schenectady | 54520–54525 | 400–405 | Omaha Road |
| 1914 | 25 | Schenectady | 54862–54886 | 2336–2360 | |
| 1916 | 12 | Schenectady | 55606–55617 | 2361–2372 | |
| 1916 | 6 | Schenectady | 55562–55567 | 406–411 | Omaha Road |
| 1916 | 25 | Schenectady | 56259–56283 | 2373–2379 | |
| 1916 | 10 | Schenectady | 56284–56293 | 412–421 | Omaha Road |
| 1917 | 25 | Schenectady | 57292–57316 | 2398–2422 | |
| 1918 | 20 | Richmond | 58144–58163 | 2423–2442 | |
| 1918 | 42 | Richmond | 58377–58418 | 2443–2484 | |
| 1919 | 8 | Richmond | 58419–58426 | 2485–2492 | |
| 1921 | 30 | Richmond | 62664–62693 | 2493–2522 | |
| 1921 | 10 | Richmond | 62785–62794 | 2523–2532 | |
| 1922 | 20 | Dunkirk | 63507–63526 | 2533–2552 | |
| 1923 | 40 | Dunkirk | 63843–63882 | 2553–2592 | |
| 1923 | 8 | Dunkirk | 64445–64452 | 2593–2600 | |
| 1923 | 10 | Dunkirk | 64453–64462 | 2701–2710 | |

== Service ==
They were used system-wide on freight trains, and became the principle freight-hauling locomotive on the railway.

The last seven locomotives built were equipped for oil firing from new; at least 18 more were retro-fitted in the 1930s and 1940s. These locomotives were used in Nebraska and Wyoming.

When new, the locomotives were hand-fired; in the mid to late 1930s many were rebuilt: driver diameter was increased by 3 inches (76 mm), boiler pressure was increased to 200 pounds per square inch (1,400 kPa) to compensate, and a BK stoker was fitted. These locomotives were reclassified as J-A. With the onset of World War II, rebuildings ceased, but the fitting of stokers continued; these stoker-fitted locomotives were re-classed as J-S.

Also during the war, several locomotives were leased to the Seaboard Air Line Railroad.

In 1944 the Chicago and North Western Railway traded two of its class J locomotives for the Omaha Road's two J-1 2-10-2 locomotives.

Retirements started in 1942, and continued until the end of steam in 1956.

Table of Chicago and North Western pre-1948 scrappings
| Year | Quantity in service at start of year | Quantity scrapped | Numbers | Notes |
|---|---|---|---|---|
| 1942 | 310 | 12 | 2303/12/14/19/26/35/58/66/77, 2401/05/70 | |
| 1943 | 298 | 2 | 2302, 2564 | 2302 wrecked on Seaboard Air Line |
| 1944 | 296 | [2] | 2363, 2372 | to Omaha Road 440, 441 |
| 1946 | 294 | 2 | 2325, 2436 | |
| 1947 | 292 | 25 | 2328/31/33/39/41/53/62/74/78/82/85/96, 2410/13/18/33/39–41/44/69/83/84/86/88 | |

Table of Omaha Road retirements
| Year | Quantity in service at start of year | Quantity scrapped | Numbers | Notes |
|---|---|---|---|---|
| 1950 | 34 | 4 | 395, 397, 403, 405 | All class J |
| 1951 | 30 | 1 | 415 | class J-A |
| 1952 | 29 | 9 | 390–394, 401, 410, 412, 441 | 410, 412, 441 class J-A; remainder class J |
| 1953 | 20 | 2 | 409, 420 | All class J-A |
| 1954 | 18 | 2 | 396, 402 | All class J-A |
| 1955 | 16 | 2 | 399, 400 | All class J-A |
| 1956 | 14 | 14 | 398, 404, 406–408, 411, 413, 414, 416–419, 421, 440 | All class J-A |

No locomotives of this class have been preserved.

== Gallery ==
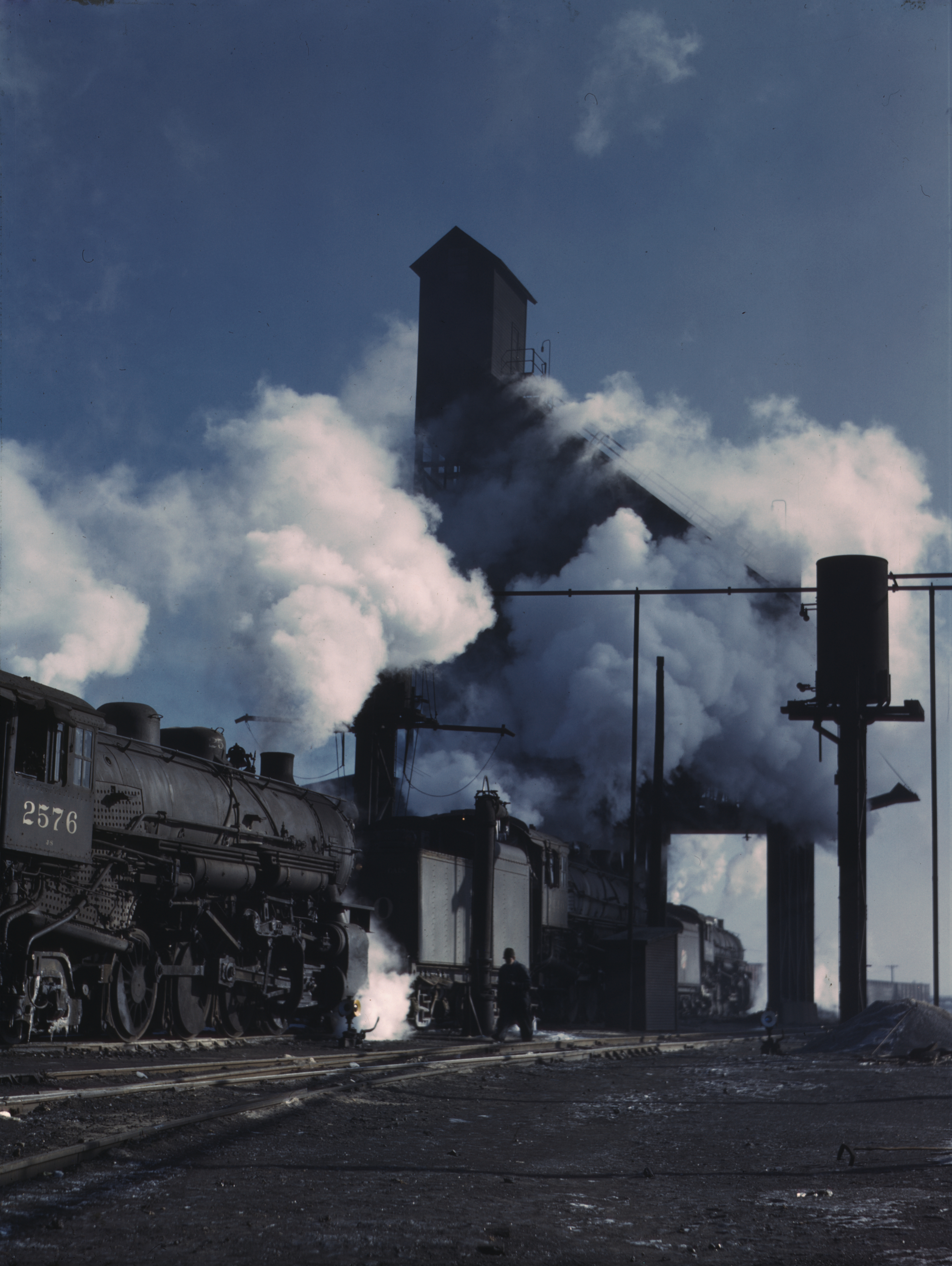
No. 2576 at a coaling station in December 1942.

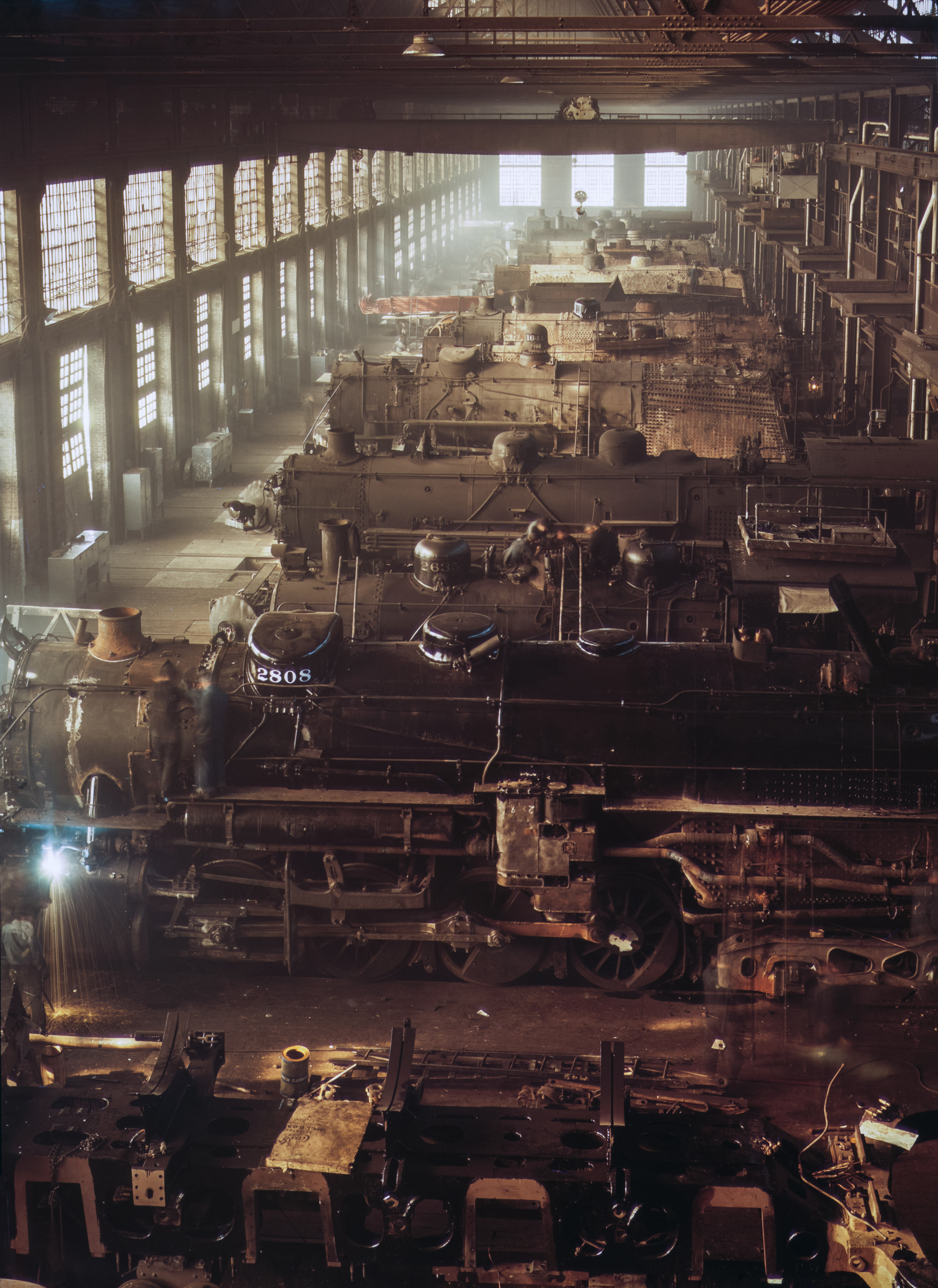
2514 and other locomotives at the workshop of the C&NW; 2514 is the third locomotive.
