= Youngstown and Ohio River Railroad =

The Youngstown and Ohio River Railroad, or Y&OR, was one of the smaller interurban railways in the state of Ohio. Along with the Youngstown and Southern Railway, the Y&OR formed a traction link between Youngstown, Ohio and the Ohio River at East Liverpool. It served several coal mines in the area and it was distinguished by the unusual feat of electrifying a section of a steam railroad, the Pittsburgh, Lisbon and Western Railroad, as part of a trackage rights agreement. The Y&OR operated for 24 years.

== History ==
In 1906, a group of promoters formed the Y&OR for the purpose of completing an electric railway link between Youngstown and the Ohio River. Initially they leased the tracks of the Pittsburgh, Lisbon and Western (PL&W) between Washingtonville and Salem and strung trolley wire over the seven-mile (11 km) stretch of tracks. Construction began from Washingtonville and by 1907 service had been extended south to Lisbon. By 1909, the entire route from Salem to East Liverpool.

Passenger operations were conducted using a group of five interurban coaches and three combines ordered from Niles Car and Manufacturing Company in 1907. Freight trains were initially hauled by steam locomotives but in 1913 the Y&OR ordered electric locomotives to replace them. These "steeplecabs" were responsible for hauling the significant number of coal trains which traversed the Y&OR.

The decline of the Y&OR began in 1921 when the Youngstown and Southern Railway ceased purchasing its electric power from the Y&OR's West Point power station. During the ensuing years of the 1920s the coal mines which provided much of the Y&OR's freight traffic began to play out and increasing use of automobiles eroded the line's passenger ridership. The company entered receivership in 1930 and all service was abandoned on March 9, 1931.

== Operations ==
The Y&OR connected with three other interurban railways. It connected with the Youngstown and Southern Railway at Columbiana, which provided a through route between Youngstown and East Liverpool, it connected with the Erie Railroad's Lisbon Branch at Leetonia, and it connected with the Stark Electric Railroad at Salem, on which passengers could ride west to Canton and a connection with the rest of the Indiana-Ohio interurban network. A third connecting line was the Steubenville, East Liverpool and Beaver Valley Traction Company, which ran through East Liverpool along the Ohio River to Steubenville in the west and Beaver, Pennsylvania.

== Rolling stock ==
The passenger equipment of the Y&OR was unusually homogeneous, with all eight cars having been built by the nearby Niles company in 1907. Cars 1-9 (odd numbers only) were 49 ft (14,935 mm) coaches with seating for 50, while cars 11, 13 and 15 were passenger-baggage combines of the same general design. Some former New York City elevated trailers were also owned for a time. All passenger rolling stock was scrapped following abandonment of the railroad.

Freight power consisted of three "steeplecab" electric locomotives built by Baldwin-Westinghouse, two dating to 1917 and the third to 1922. The three locomotives were sold, two to the Union Electric Railway of Kansas and one to the Omaha, Lincoln and Beatrice Railway. One locomotive is now preserved at the Ohio Railway Museum while another is still in use on the Iowa Traction Railroad.

== Sources ==
- Central Electric Railfans Association (1965). Electric Railways of Northeastern Ohio. Chicago, Illinois: Central Electric Railfans Association. pp. 204–209.
- Hilton, George W. & Due, John Fitzgerald (1960). The Electric Interurban Railways in America. Stanford, California: Stanford University Press. pp. 270–271. OCLC 237973.
