= Norfolk and Western 578 =

Preserved N&W Class E2a 4-6-2 locomotive

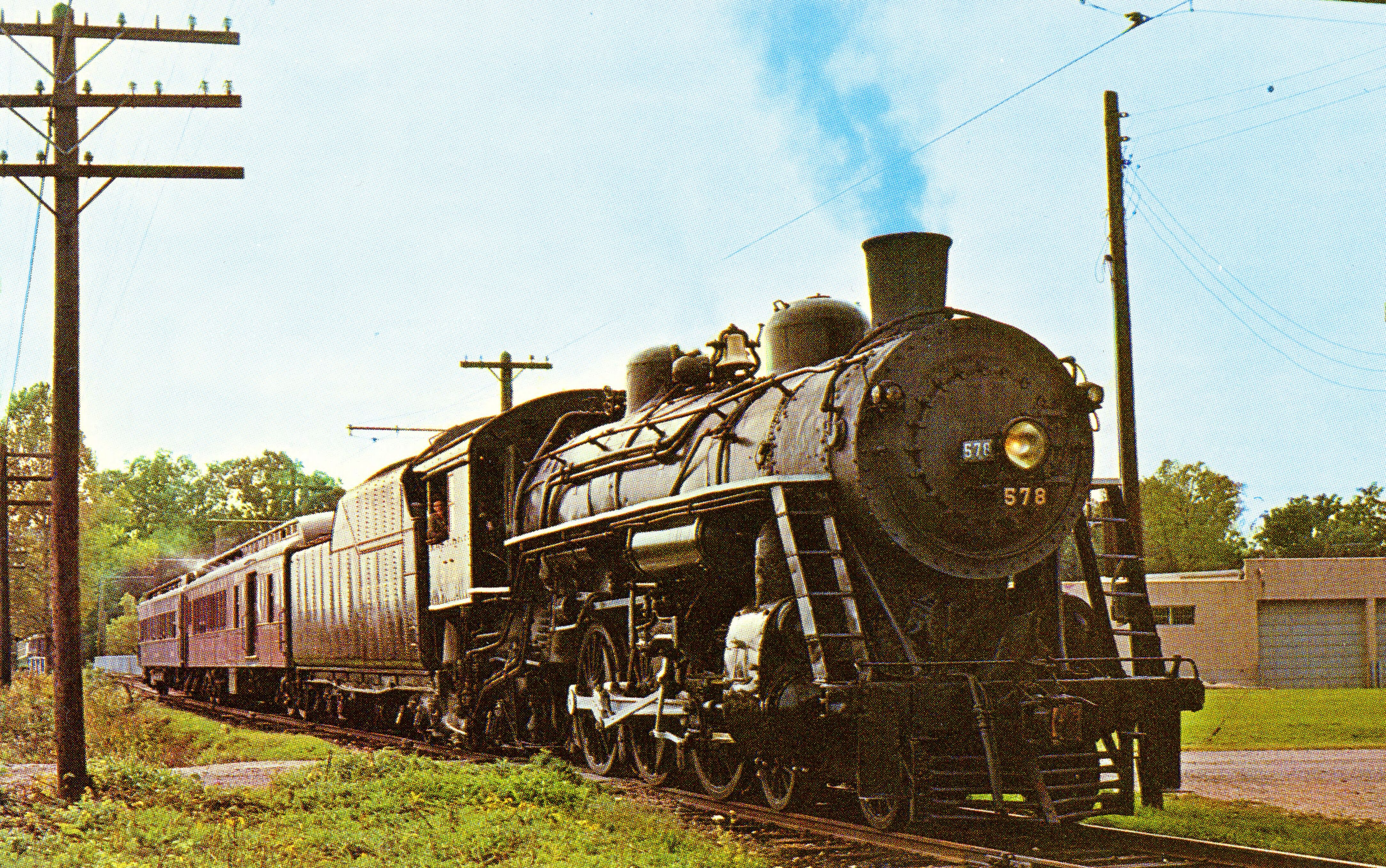
- No. 578 hauling an excursion train on the Ohio Railway Museum
Type and origin
- Power type: Steam
- Builder: American Locomotive Company (Richmond Works)
- Serial number: 46831
- Build date: March 1910
Specifications
- Configuration
  - Whyte: 4-6-2
  - UIC: 2'C1
- Gauge: 1,435 mm (4 ft 8 1/2 in)
- Driver dia.: 70 in (1,800 mm)
- Wheelbase: 72.19 ft (22.00 m)
  - Engine: 32.87 ft (10.02 m)
  - Drivers: 12.50 ft (3.81 m)
- Axle load: 56,000 lb (25,000 kg)
- Adhesive weight: 166,000 lb (75,000 kg)
- Loco weight: 247,000 lb (112,000 kg)
- Tender weight: 167,500 lb (76,000 kg)
- Total weight: 414,500 lb (188,000 kg)
- Fuel type: Coal
- Fuel capacity: New: 14 t (14 long tons; 15 short tons); Now: 26 t (26 long tons; 29 short tons)
- Water cap.: New: 9,000 US gal (34,000 L; 7,500 imp gal); Now: 18,000 US gal (68,000 L; 15,000 imp gal)
- Firebox
  - Grate area: 45.50 sq ft (4.227 m^{2})
- Boiler pressure: 200 psi (1,400 kPa)
- Heating surface
  - Firebox: 180 sq ft (17 m^{2})
- Cylinders: Two, outside
- Cylinder size: 22.5 in × 28 in (570 mm × 710 mm)
- Valve gear: Baker
Performance figures
- Tractive effort: 34,425 lb (15,615 kg)
- Factor of adh.: 4.82
Career
- Operators: Norfolk and Western Railway; Ohio Railway Museum
- Class: E2a
- Number in class: 15th out of 16
- Numbers: N&W 578
- Retired: December 1958 (revenue service); 1978 (excursion service)
- Restored: 1960
- Current owner: Ohio Railway Museum
- Disposition: On static display

Norfolk and Western 578 is a preserved 4-6-2 "Pacific" type steam locomotive. Built by American Locomotive Company's (ALCO) Richmond Works in March 1910, No. 578 was assigned to pull premiere passenger trains for the Norfolk and Western Railway (N&W) before it was downgraded to secondary passenger service. It was retired from revenue service altogether in 1958, and it was subsequently donated to the Ohio Railway Museum (ORMX) in Worthington, Ohio. The Ohio Railway Museum used No. 578 to pull some tourist trains on their trackage, until it was sidelined as a result of mechanical problems in the early 1970s. As of 2026, No. 578 remains on static display next to the Ohio Railway Museum's depot.

== History ==
=== Revenue service ===
In the early 1910s, the Norfolk and Western Railway (N&W) ordered a fleet of 4-6-2 "Pacific" type locomotives from the American Locomotive Company (ALCO) in order to expand their passenger locomotive fleet. Sixteen E2 class 4-6-2s were built at ALCO's former Richmond Locomotive Works plant in Richmond, Virginia in March 1910, being numbered 564–579, and No. 578 was the second-final member of the class. Two years later, in 1912, No. 578, along with the rest of the E2 class locomotives, was modified with superheated flues, and it was reclassified as an E2a.

The N&W initially assigned their fleet of 4-6-2's to pull the railroad's high-priority passenger trains on their mainline throughout Virginia, West Virginia, and Ohio. Some 4-6-2s were also used on passenger services into North Carolina, including the Durham route. Between 1917 and 1944, No. 578 was primarily used to pull passenger trains throughout the Scioto Division out of Columbus, Ohio. As time progressed, No. 578 and the rest of the N&W's 4-6-2s were reassigned to pull short-distance passenger trains, as well as commuter trains on branchlines, when the K class 4-8-2 "Mountain" types and J class 4-8-4 "Northerns" were built and assigned to pull the high-priority trains. Towards the end of the 1940s, No. 578's original tender was replaced with a larger tender with the same coal and water capacity as a K1 class 4-8-2.

The locomotive subsequently spent the remainder of its revenue career pulling local passenger trains on the N&W's Norton Branch between Norton, Virginia and Bluefield, West Virginia alongside some of its remaining classmates. The locomotive completed its final revenue passenger run in December 1958 before it was removed from the N&W's active list.

=== Preservation ===
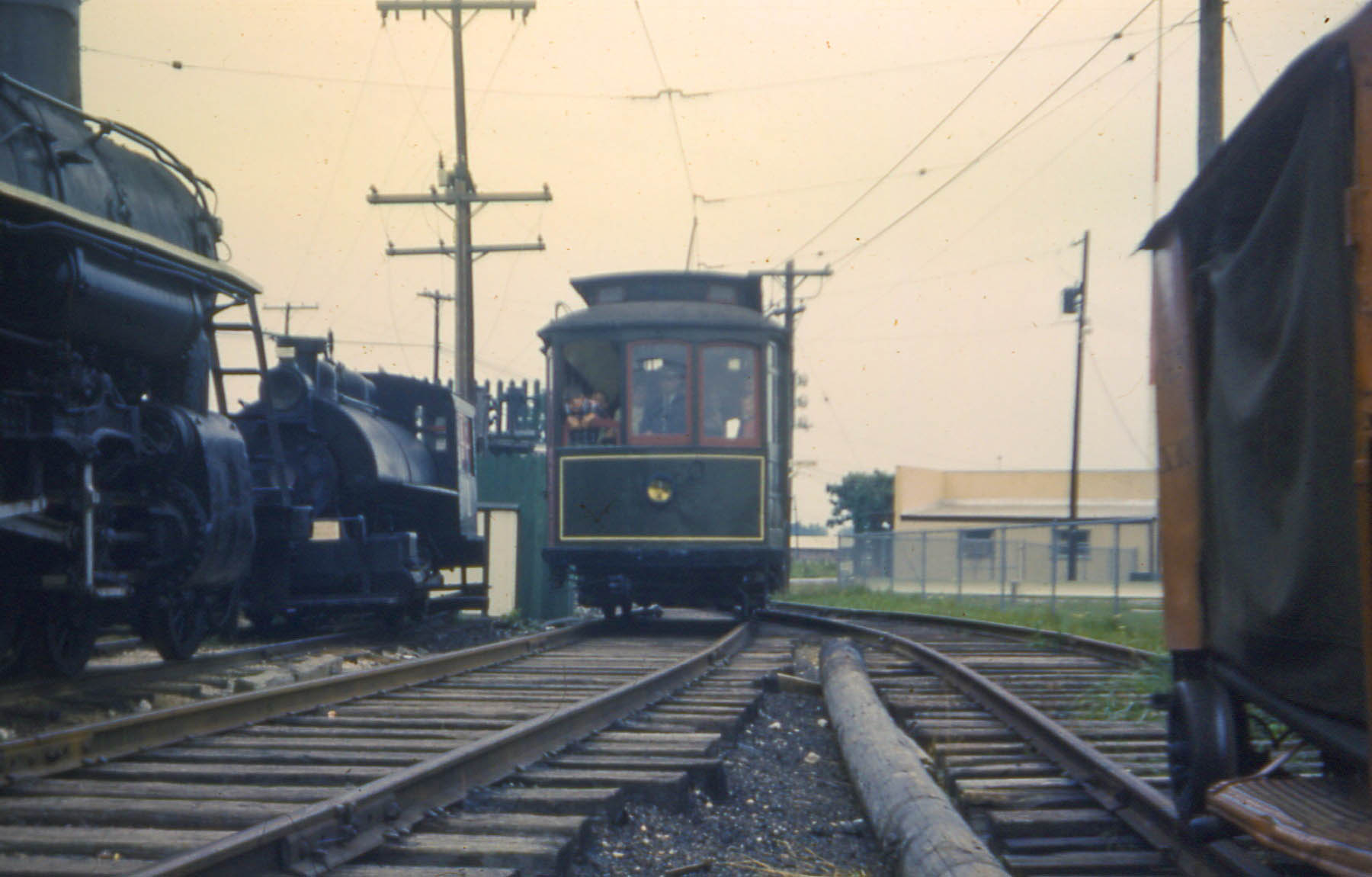
No. 578 (left) on static display with Marble Quarry 0-4-0T No. 1

While the rest of the N&W's fleet of 4-6-2's were sold for scrap, No. 578 was donated to the Central Ohio Railfan Association of Worthington, Ohio in 1959. Upon arrival in Worthington, No. 578 was still in operational condition. Beginning on July 10, 1960, No. 578 pulled the association's short-distance tourist trains, and the locomotive carried over 3,000 passengers during that year's operating season. In 1966, No. 578's flue time expired, and it had to be removed from service. Volunteers subsequently spent the next four years repairing No. 578's boiler in order to return the locomotive to service. Restoration work was completed in 1970, and No. 578 pulled some more tourist trains on the now-slightly extended line for the Association, which changed its name to the Ohio Railway Museum (ORM).

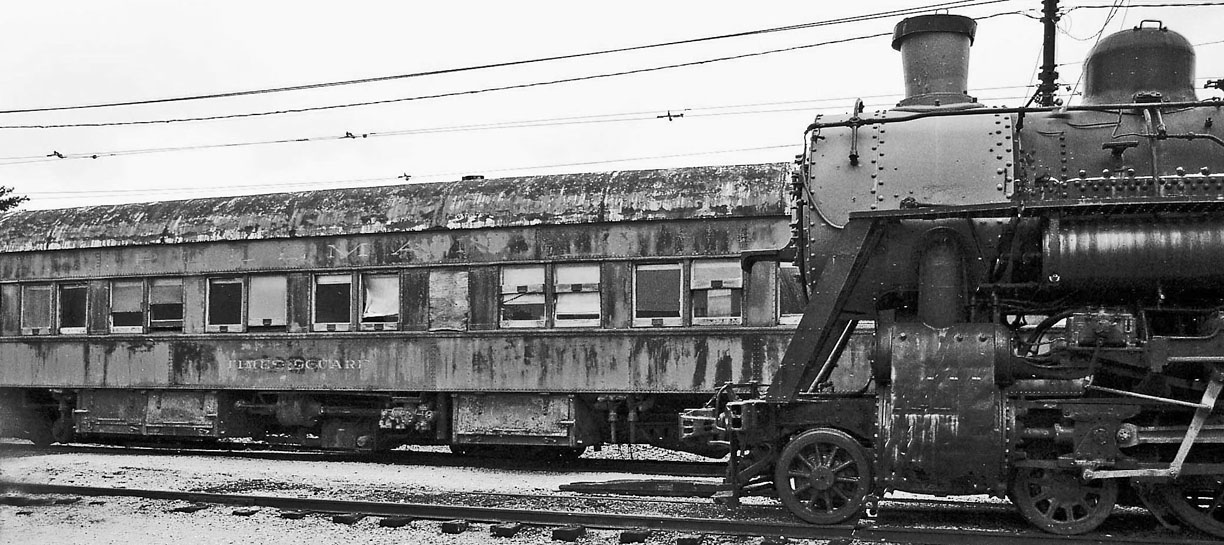
No. 578 on static display at the Ohio Railway Museum without its headlight.

By the end of the 1970s, it was discovered that No. 578 had a broken spring hanger, which was deemed too expensive to repair or replace. A decision was subsequently made to further remove No. 578 from service and keep it as a permanent static display piece. In the late 2000s, The Ohio Central Railroad System founder Jerry Jacobson offered to purchase No. 578 from the museum and use it for their excursions, but the museum declined the offer. As of 2026, No. 578 remains on static display on ORM's property and There are currently no plans to restore the locomotive back to operation.

== See also ==
- Norfolk and Western 433
- Norfolk and Western 475
- Norfolk and Western 611
