= Ohio Railway Museum =

Railway museum in Worthington, Ohio

Coordinates: 40.09308°N 83.00325°W

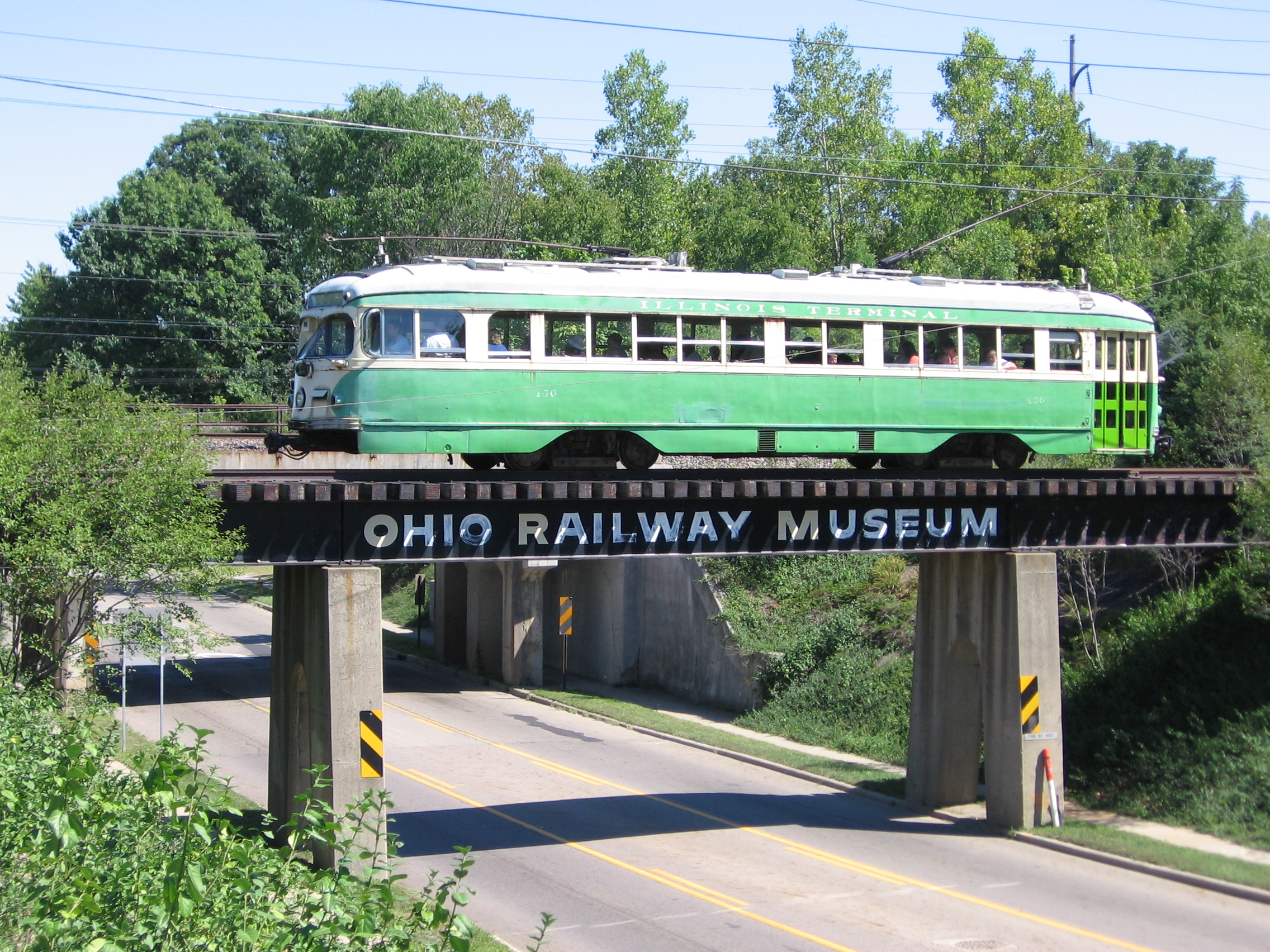
PCC streetcar 450 operating on the museum line

The Ohio Railway Museum (reporting mark ORMX) is a railway museum that was founded in 1948. It is located in Worthington, Ohio, near Columbus, Ohio.

== History ==
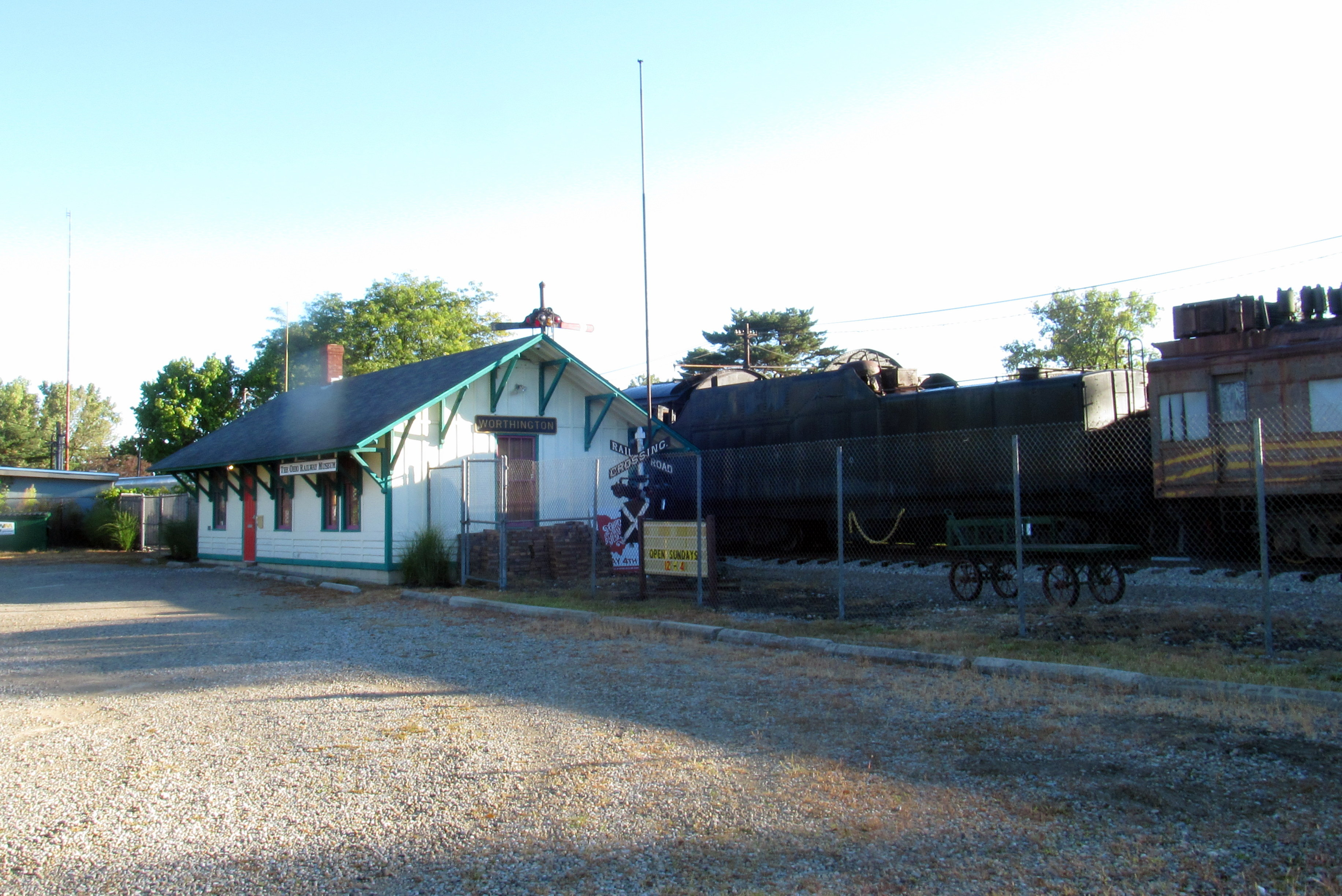
The Worthington station, a replica of typical stations of the late 1800s, and part of the collection

Established in 1948 and incorporated August 22, 1950, the museum is one of the oldest organizations involved with the preservation of railroad equipment and railroad history in North America that includes an operating railroad line. The museum was started on the grounds of the former Columbus, Delaware and Marion Railway with the name of "The Central Ohio Railfans Association" and officially changed its name to The Ohio Railway Museum February 17, 1993.

== Mission ==
The Ohio Railway Museum (ORM) is an educational organization dedicated to the preservation and operation of historic railway equipment. A special focus is its collection of historic Ohio Railway equipment and artifacts. The museum educates the public through operations of historic equipment; special events; publications; and community involvement.

== Collection highlights ==
- Ohio Public Service #21
- Norfolk & Western #578
- Marble Cliff Quarry Co. #1
- Kansas City Public Service #472
- Columbus Street Railway (Columbus & Southern Electric) #703
- Illinois Terminal Railroad #450
- Columbus & Southern Ohio Electric #2
- Youngstown and Ohio River Railroad #7
- Cincinnati and Lake Erie Railroad #119
- Greater Cleveland Regional Transit Authority (RTA) #163
- Columbus, Delaware and Marion Railway #501
- Ohio Public Service #64 (Built As #41)
- United States Army Transportation Corps #7178

== Collection description ==
=== Ohio Public Service #21 ===
Car #21 was the first piece acquired by the museum in 1947. It was moved to the museum grounds in 1948. The car is a fine example of wooden interurban car construction as of the 1900-1910 period. It was built by the Niles Car and Manufacturing Company of Niles, Ohio in 1905. It is considered a combination passenger-baggage type interurban. The car is 50 feet 6 inches (15.39 m) long and weighs 60,500 pounds. It is equipped with four General Electric number 263A 65 hp (48 kW) motors, one General Electric type K-34D2 controller and one Westinghouse 3817 air compressor. Car #21 and its sister #20 both had a baggage compartment at the front, a smoker section seating 12, and a main passenger section seating 34. The car is single-ended and is operated from the baggage compartment. Also inside the baggage compartment is an early telephone that could be used for communications with the dispatcher by hooking the leads over a phone line strung along the track. The interior of the car is finished in quartered oak, originally with leather seats in the smoking compartment and plush seats in the passenger section. The car is listed on the National Register of Historic Places.

=== Norfolk & Western #578 ===
Norfolk and Western 578 is a 4-6-2 "Pacific" E2a steam locomotive built in March 1910 by the American Locomotive Company's Richmond Works. The full length including the tender is 90 feet 9 inches (27.66 m). The weight fully loaded is 285 tons (259 t). The 6 sets of wheels from front to back are two sets of 33-inch (840 mm) wheels for the pilot truck, 3 sets of 70-inch (1.8 m) wheels for the drivers, and one set of 42-inch (1,100 mm) wheels for the trailing truck. The tender has 2 Buckeye steel built 6 wheel trucks each wheel at 33 inches. The full height of the locomotive is 15 feet 9 inches (4.80 m) The fuel capacity is 26 tons of coal and 18,000 U.S. gallons (68,000 L) of water. This locomotive was donated to the Ohio Railway Museum on February 12, 1959, from the Norfolk and Western Railway Company.

Norfolk & Western #578 is the last surviving one of 26 E2a locomotives built for the Norfolk and Western Railway Company. Numbers 553-558 were built by the Baldwin Locomotive Works while numbers 559-563 were built by the Norfolk & Western shops at Roanoke and numbers 564-579 were built by Alco's Richmond Works.

The 4-6-2 designation indicates that there are four wheels in the pilot truck, six driving wheels, and two wheels in the trailing truck. The term "Pacific" was given to this wheel arrangement because it was first used on the Missouri Pacific Railroad. The E2a locomotives were first used for mainline passenger service and later for branch line service when replaced by larger equipment. The E2a's could pull up to 8 heavy Pullman passenger cars at 70 miles per hour. Through the years, these locomotives were equipped with various types of tenders. The current tender on #578 is the largest used with any E2a and is originally from a larger 4-8-2 "Mountain" type locomotive. It is equipped with a stoker and can be operated with an auxiliary tender for greater range. #578 was assigned to the Scioto division operating into Columbus from 1917 to 1944, and was transferred to the Norton branch from Bluefield, West Virginia to Norton, Virginia, and was retired from service in December 1958 after a 48-year career.

=== Marble Cliff Quarries #1 ===
This 0-4-0 saddle tank steam locomotive was built in 1924 by the Vulcan Iron Works. It is 20 feet (6.1 m) long (6 m) and weighs 40,000 pounds (18,000 kg) and has 4 drivers, each measuring 33 inches (840 mm) in length. It was donated to the museum in 1954 in operating condition after service with the Marble Cliff Quarries Company. It was used by the museum to pull N&W #578 onto the museum property.

In 2006, the engine was cosmetically restored and Loaned to The Depot Rail Museum. In 2018 #1 was moved back to the museum property and is on display again.

=== Kansas City Public Service #472 ===
472 is a 4-wheel DuPont Type C single-truck streetcar built in 1900 by the Brownell Car Company. It is 30 feet (9.1 m) long and seats 24 passengers with a crew of 2. It was donated to the museum in 1956.

=== Columbus Railway Power and Light #703 ===
703 is a Columbus streetcar built in 1925 by the G. C. Kuhlman Car Company. It weighs 36,620 pounds (16,610 kg) and is 45 feet 3.3 inches (13.800 m) long. It seats 48 passengers and 2 crew members. It currently has Canadian Car & Foundry 3550 type trucks with 26 inch diameter wheels. It was donated to the museum in 1962. Street Car 703 is currently under restoration to working order.

=== Illinois Terminal Railroad #450 ===
450 is a Presidents' Conference Committee (PCC) car. Built in 1949 by the St. Louis Car Company, it is 50 feet 5 inches (15.37 m) long and weighs 42,680 pounds (19,360 kg). It was donated to the museum in 1964. It runs trips taking visitors up and down the line on the museum's operating days.
