= Niles Car and Manufacturing Company =

- Company type: Subsidiary
- Industry: Rail transport
- Founded: 1901; 125 years ago
- Defunct: 1917; 109 years ago
- Successor: Engel Aircraft Company
- Headquarters: Niles, Ohio, USA
- Area served: Worldwide
- Products: Streetcars and interurbans

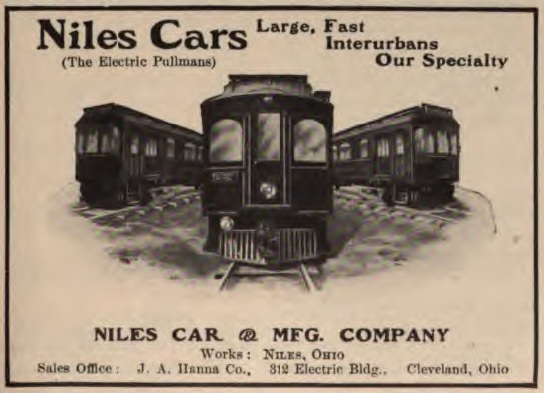
1908 Niles advertisement

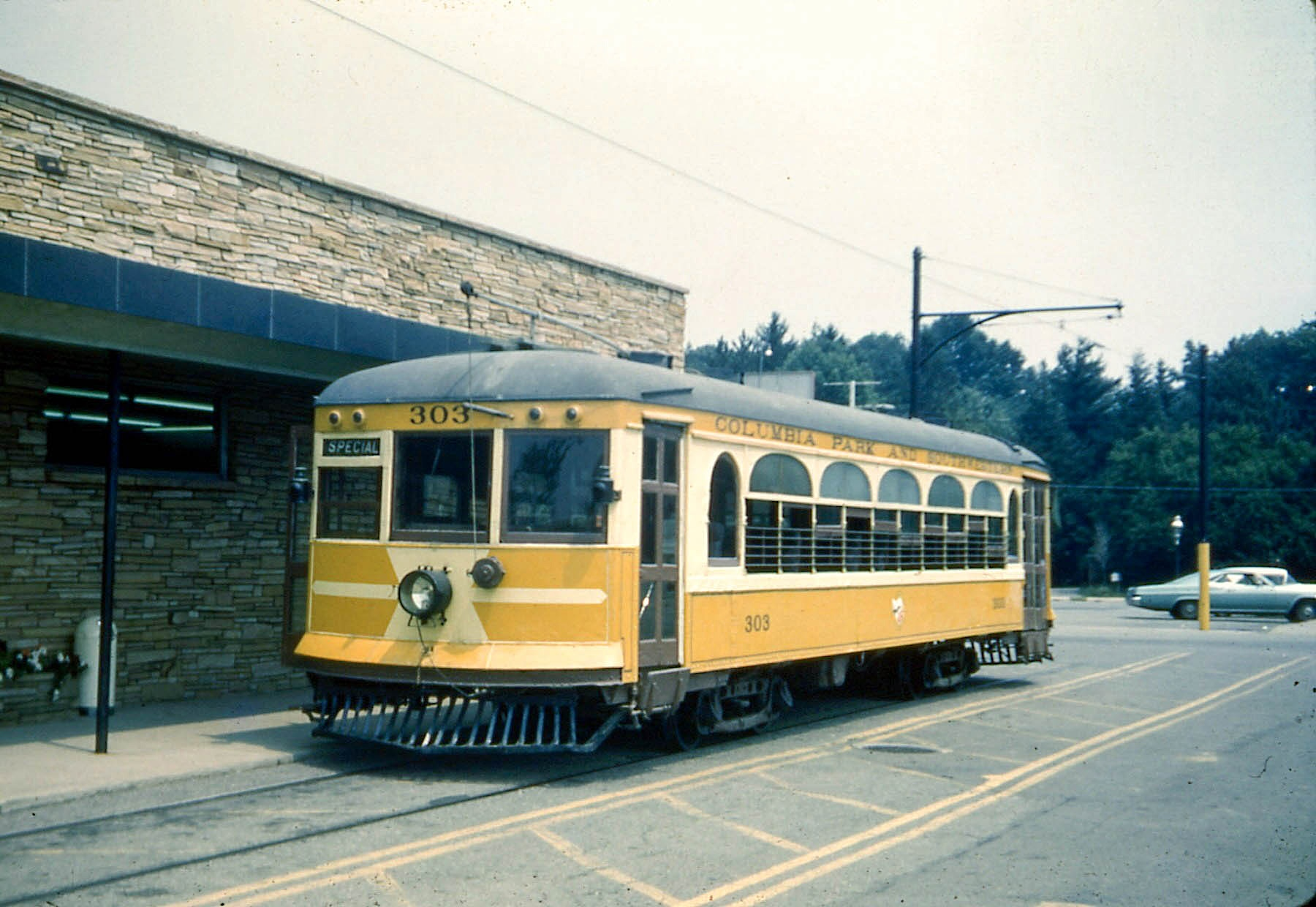
A Niles interurban car built in 1906, at a now-closed museum in 1966. This car is now preserved at the Connecticut Trolley Museum.

The Niles Car and Manufacturing Company was an American manufacturer of railroad equipment, including many streetcar and interurban cars. It was founded in 1901 in Niles, Ohio and published catalogs showcasing their various cars.

Niles specialized in building wooden-bodied cars in the heyday of interurban building. Its cars had a reputation of being well-built and stylish; Niles advertising called them "The Electric Pullmans."

The company also produced equipment for the trucking industry, an industry reference citing 2 models of 1 and 2 tons respectively, costing $1500 to $2400, utilizing a worm drive and custom bodies to suit.

The company ceased producing railroad cars in 1917. The plant and equipment were purchased by the Engel Aircraft Company to produce aircraft parts for the United States Army Signal Corps.

== Customers ==
Niles' clients included the:

- Aurora Elgin and Chicago Railroad (later the Chicago Aurora and Elgin Railroad); including the oldest operating interurban in the US (#20)
- Bamberger Electric Railroad
- Fort Dodge, Des Moines and Southern Railway
- Northern Electric Railway (later part of the Sacramento Northern Railway)
- The Milwaukee Electric Railway and Light Company
- Northern Ohio Traction & Light
- Pacific Northwest Traction Company
- Rochester, Lockport and Buffalo Railroad
- Rock Island Southern Railway
- San Francisco, Napa and Calistoga Railway
- St. Paul Southern Electric Railway
- The Chicago Lake Shore and South Bend Railway
- Toledo, Port Clinton and Lakeside Railway
- Toronto Civic Railways (DE DT M - late TTC Class H, H1 and H3 cars).
- Washington, Baltimore and Annapolis Electric Railway
- Yakima Valley Transportation Company
- Youngstown and Ohio River Railroad
