= Santa Fe 769 =

Preserved Santa Fe 769 class 2-8-0 locomotive

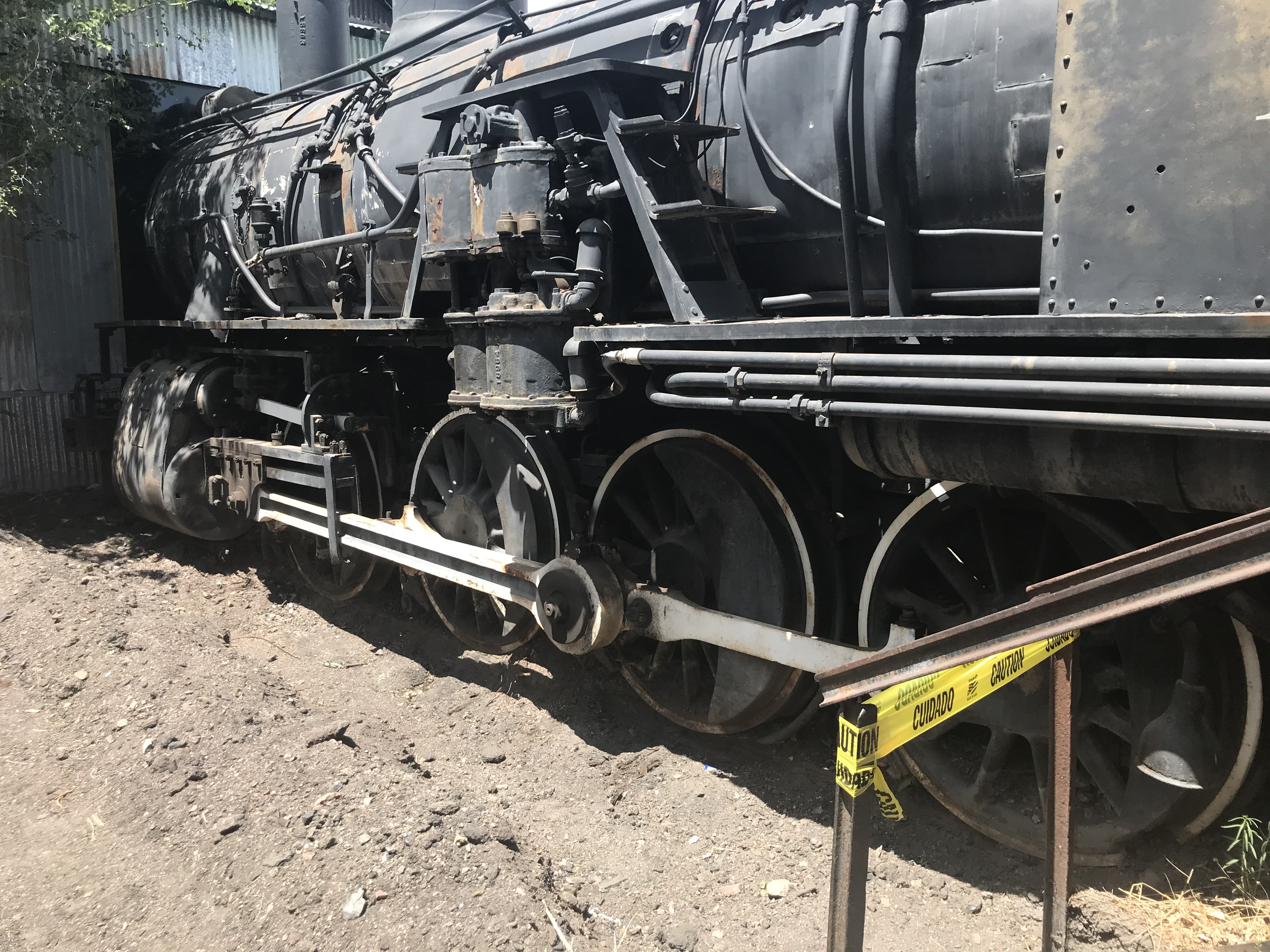
- No. 769 on static display in Madrid, New Mexico, slowly awaiting to be removed from the dirt, 2021
Type and origin
- Power type: Steam
- Builder: Richmond Locomotive Works
- Serial number: 2957
- Build date: June 1900
Specifications
- Configuration
  - Whyte: 2-8-0
  - UIC: 1'D
- Gauge: 4 ft 8 1/2 in (1,435 mm)
- Driver dia.: 57 in (1,400 mm)
- Wheelbase
  - Engine: 23 in (580 mm)
  - Drivers: 15 in (380 mm)
- Adhesive weight: 161,650 lbf (719,100 N)
- Loco weight: 179,300 lbf (798,000 N)
- Tender weight: 105,000 lb (48,000 kg)
- Total weight: 284.300 lb (128.956 kg)
- Fuel type: Coal
- Fuel capacity: 12 t (12 long tons; 13 short tons)
- Water cap.: 9,000 US gal (34,000 L; 7,500 imp gal)
- Firebox
  - Grate area: 30 sq ft (2.8 m^{2})
- Boiler pressure: 195 psi (1,340 kPa)
- Heating surface
  - Firebox: 183 sq ft (17.0 m^{2})
  - Total surface: 2,190 sq ft (203 m^{2})
- Cylinders: Two, outside
- Cylinder size: 21 in × 30 in (530 mm × 760 mm)
- Valve gear: Stephenson
- Valve type: Piston valves
- Loco brake: Air
- Train brakes: Air
- Couplers: Knuckle
Performance figures
- Tractive effort: 39,458 lbf (175,520 N)
Career
- Operators: Santa Fe Pacific Railroad; Atchison, Topeka and Santa Fe Railway; Albuquerque and Cerrillos Coal Company
- Class: 769
- Numbers: SFP 266; ATSF 3045; ATSF 769
- Retired: 1954
- Current owner: Old Coal Mine Museum
- Disposition: Awaiting for restoration to operating condition

Atchison, Topeka and Santa Fe No. 769 is a preserved 769 class 2-8-0 "consolidation" type steam locomotive originally built by the Richmond Locomotive Works in 1900 as one of the Santa Fe Pacific Railroad's final locomotives. It was originally numbered 266 before the SFP had completely merged into its parent company, the Atchison, Topeka and Santa Fe Railway, and the locomotive was renumbered 3045, and it was eventually renumbered again to 769. The locomotive was put into use for short-distance freight trains and for yard switching before being sold again in 1950 to the Albuquerque and Cerrillos Coal Company in Madrid, New Mexico for more yard switching and short distance coal trains. As the 1950s progressed, however, the company shut down due to bankruptcy, and No. 769 was abandoned along with the rest of the locomotive yard and the rest of Madrid. In the late 1970s the town was recovered and converted into a heritage town, and No. 769 was then put on static display just behind the shed it was stored in, which was converted to the Engine House Theatre. In early 2020, No. 769 was selected for a future project to restore it to operating condition to eventually run on reconstructed trackage between Madrid and a nearby BNSF interchange near Los Cerrillos.

== History ==
=== Original service life ===
After becoming a subsidiary of the Atchison, Topeka and Santa Fe Railway in 1897, the Atlantic and Pacific Railroad decided to upgrade their steam locomotive fleet with a series of 2-8-0 "consolidation" types. The first order came with eighteen locomotives from the Baldwin Locomotive Works in Philadelphia, Pennsylvania and Dickson Locomotive Works in Scranton, Pennsylvania in 1899, initially numbered 1–18 right before being renumbered 246–265. A second batch of twenty locomotives from the Richmond Locomotive Works of Richmond, Virginia came along the following year, numbered 266–285. No. 769 was numbered 266 at the time and was the very first of the Richmond batch that came in 1900, one year before the Richmond works would merge into the American Locomotive Company. These little locomotives were commonly used for freight service on the mainline, as 2-8-0s were the most common wheel arrangement to show up at the time. In 1902, the SFP became completely absorbed into the Santa Fe, and a renumbering system was in order for the 2-8-0s; Nos 246–265 were renumbered 3030–3044 and 3100–3102. Nos 266–285 were also renumbered 3045–3064. Only a few years later, the 2-8-0s were renumbered again; the 1899 group of locomotives renumbered Nos 699–706 and 719–728, and the 1900 group of locomotives renumbered 769–788.

These little locomotives were primarily used for mainline freight trains throughout the Santa Fe system in Arizona, New Mexico, Texas, and Kansas until the mid-late 1910s, when larger locomotives, including the 2-10-2 "Santa Fe" type and the 2-8-2 "Mikado", were becoming more frequently built in favor of the growing freight traffic, and the 2-8-0s, including No. 769, were relegated to yard switching and pulling shorter freight trains on branch lines. As the 1930s and 1940s progressed, the Santa Fe retired their aging 2-8-0s and sold them for scrap, but No. 769 was one of the exceptions. At one point, the locomotive swapped tenders with 4-6-2 No. 1227. In April 1950, No. 769 was sold off to the Albuquerque and Cerrillos Coal Company in the mountain-based town of Madrid, New Mexico, which was located at the end of a branch extending south from the Santa Fe main at Waldo. There, No. 769 was only accompanied by 2-8-0s No. 772, 870, and 874. It was regularly used by the A&CCCO to haul coal and water between Madrid and Santa Fe to provide warmth for the citizens who lived in Madrid. However, No. 769's time at the A&CCCO was cut short in 1954, when the company decided to cease all train operations after a catastrophic fire burned down the building that stored most of their coal, and coal marketing was declining in favor of oil marketing. No. 772 and 874 would be sold for scrap as an attempt for the company to recoup some of their financial losses, but to no avail. By the end of the decade, the entire town itself was abandoned, and Nos 769 and 870 would sit idle there for the next twenty years. While No. 870 was left outside, exposed to the elements, No. 769 was stored underneath one of very few engine sheds that were left there.

=== Preservation ===
In the late 1970s, the ghost town of Madrid was rediscovered by a group of explorers, and the town was soon re-populated as an artist community and tourist attraction. While No. 870 was sold off to Santa Fe Springs, California, No. 769 remained in Madrid, and was sold in 1982 to Joe Huber. Huber cosmetically restored the locomotive, and moved No. 769 outside its previous storage shed, which was converted to a theatre as part of Madrid's Old Coal Mine Museum. No. 769 was facing forward toward the stage as a dramatic backdrop. However, No. 769 is in an active flood zone. When the town of Madrid experienced floods, No. 769's wheels were buried in deposits of sand and silt, which required the locomotive to be regularly dug out. Local road enhancement projects completed in 2010 now prevent severe flooding in Madrid, but 769's wheels remained buried in about one foot of dirt, with the tracks intact underneath.

Since March 2020, the Old Coal Mine Museum’s new owner, Lori Lindsey, has invited volunteers from the New Mexico Steam Locomotive and Railroad Historical Society (NMS&RHS) and the Cumbres and Toltec Scenic Railroad to help clean and inspect No. 769, with most of the components deemed to be in good condition as a result of the dry climate in the Southwestern US. This work is part of the early process of restoring No. 769 to operating condition. Some features of No. 769 remain in disrepair, including the smokebox, which is corroded and filled with sawdust due to the locomotive's uncovered smokestack, and the tender, which has begun to develop cracks. Volunteers are currently preparing the locomotive to be moved, either to a temporary shop in Madrid or a roundhouse in Albuquerque, to perform a necessary rebuild on the locomotive, estimated to cost over $1.2 million. The Old Coal Mine Museum had originally considered leasing No. 769 to the Santa Fe Southern Railway, in order to operate it there, but it was later discovered that the locomotive is too heavy for the Santa Fe Southern’s trackage and bridges. As of 2024, the museum is raising additional funds to reconstruct the old Madrid line to eventually begin their own tourist operation with No. 769.

== Historical significance ==
Although there are seven other surviving Santa Fe 2-8-0s, No. 769 is the sole survivor of its particular class, and it was the first locomotive of said class.

No. 769 is the last locomotive built by the Richmond Locomotive Works before their 1901 merging into the American Locomotive Company that’s preserved in the United States. The only other pre-1901 Richmond survivor is 4-6-0 No. 293 in Saint Petersburg, Russia.

== See also ==
- Richmond Locomotive Works
- Atchison, Topeka and Santa Fe Railway
- Madrid, New Mexico
- Santa Fe 5
- Santa Fe 1010
- Santa Fe 2926
- Santa Fe Southern Railway
