= Jonathan Bryan (businessman) =

American businessman (1874–1933)

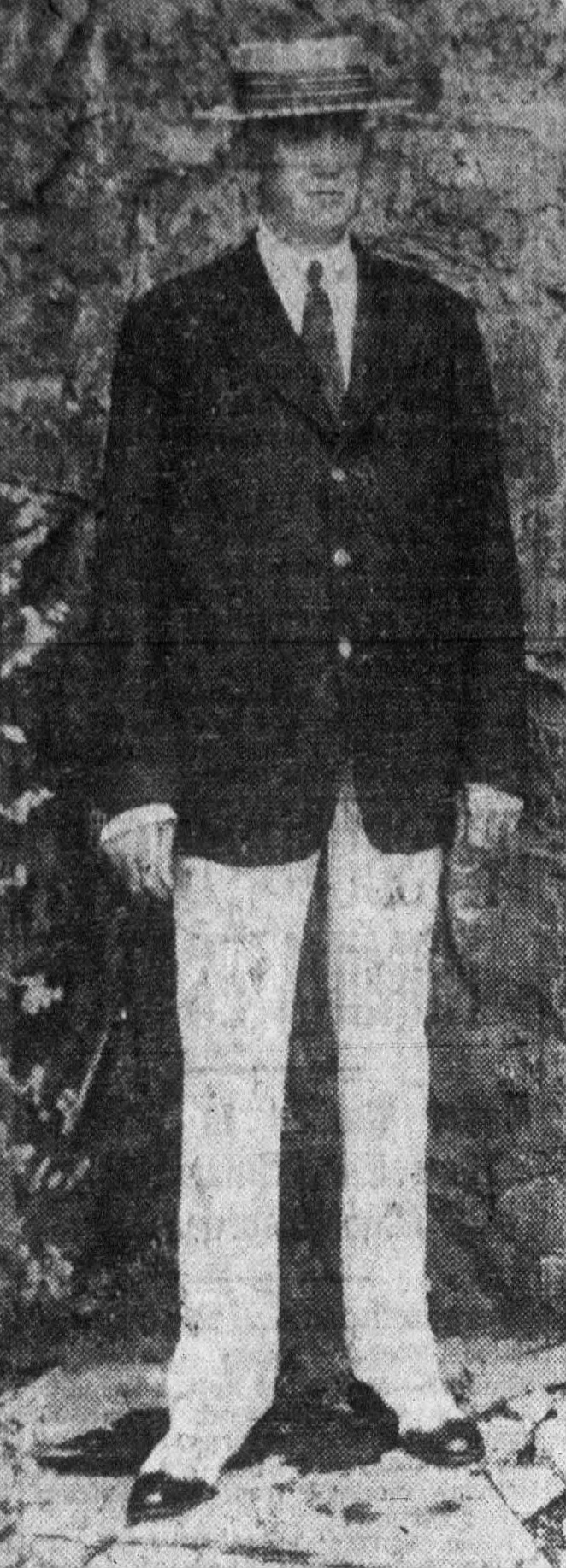
- Jonathan Bryan, 1929
- Born: December 6, 1874; Henrico County, Virginia, US
- Died: January 15, 1933 (aged 58); Richmond, Virginia, US
- Burial place: Hollywood Cemetery (Richmond, Virginia)
- Education: University of Virginia
- Occupations: Broker, businessman
- Employer(s): Richmond Locomotive Works Richmond-Ashland Railway Company Bryan, Kemp & Co.

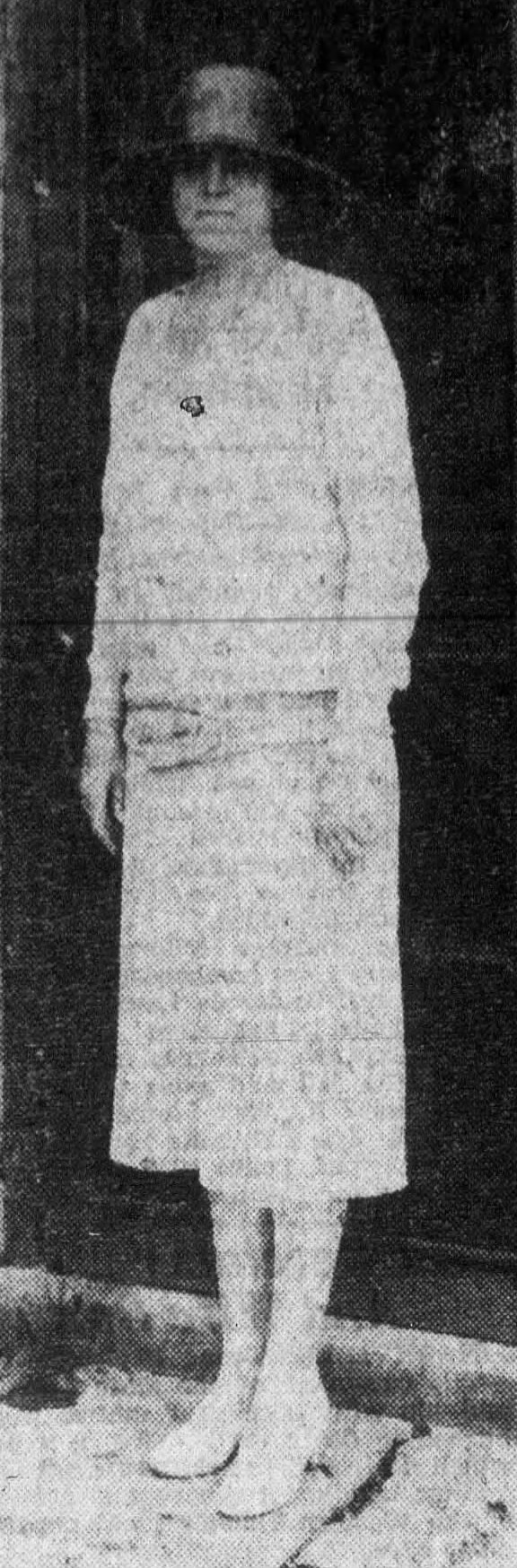
Winifred "Duffy" Bryan, 1929

Jonathan Bryan (December 6, 1874 – January 15, 1933) was an American capitalist, broker, and businessman. Bryan was the president of the Richmond-Ashland Railway Company and president of Bryan, Kemp & Co. brokerage firm. He also worked for the Richmond Locomotive Works. He was the son of newspaperman Joseph Bryan and brother of John Stewart Bryan.

== Personal life ==
Bryan was born on December 6, 1874, at Brook Hill, his maternal grandparent's home in Henrico County, Virginia. He was the third son of Isobel Lamond (née Stewart) and Joseph Bryan, publisher of the Richmond Times-Dispatch. He grew up at his family's home Laburnum. His early education was in private schools operated by Thomas H. Norwood and John P. McGuire Sr.

Bryan attended the University of Virginia from 1893 to 1896. While there, he was captain of the baseball and football teams. He was also a member of Eli Banana secret society and the fraternity of Delta Psi (St. Anthony Hall).

== Career ==
Bryan left college to work for the Richmond Locomotive Works, a company his father owned and operated. In late 1898, Bryan was tasked with going to Europe to deliver seventeen locomotives for the Finland State Railway. When that job was completed in April 1899, he remained in Europe to receive delivery of twenty engines being built for the Swedish government. He also took the time to learn the Finnish language. He cabled from Europe in October 1899, stating that he had received an order for 22 locomotives for the Finland State Railway. When he returned home in November 1899, The Richmond Dispatch called his business trip a "most phenomenal success". Noting the sales he made with both the Finnish and Swedish governments, The Richmond Times said his trip "exceeded expectations".

Bryan returned to Europe in May 1900, where he oversaw Richmond Locomotive Works' exhibit at the 1900 Paris Expedition. In addition to the world's fair, Bryan made calls to clients in Finland, France, Spain, and Sweden. In December 1900, Bryan purchased a 47-acre property called Poplar Hill, a mile northeast of Richmond. In March 1902, he sold the Poplar Hill property to the Richmond Locomotive Works, at cost. Bryan was connected to the firm until he was sold to the American Locomotive Company in 1901.

In December 1917, Bryan and Oliver Jackson Sands Jr., president of the American National Bank, purchased the defunct Richmond & Chesapeake Bay Railway Co for $135,000. The renamed Richmond-Ashland Railway Company, which was chartered in Virginia on April 15, 1919, and opened on July 5, 1919. Despite recasting the railroad from a luxury line to a commuter line, the railroad ceased operations on March 22, 1938. Bryan was the railroad's president from 1919 to 1932, and was then its vice-president.

During World War I, President Woodrow Wilson asked Bryan to serve as the United States Assistant Secretary of War, but Bryan declined the appointment due to his various business concerns. Bryan was president of the Richmond Forgings Corporation, Richmond Tractor Company, and the real estate development companies Laburnam Realty Corporation, Rothesay Realty Corporation, Westover Hills Corporation, and Westview Land and Improvement Corporation. He was also a member of the firm Bryan Brothers with his brothers, J. St. George Bryan, John Stewart Bryan, and Dr. Robert C. Bryan.

Bryan was president of Bryan, Kemp & Co. brokerage firm, established in Richmond in 1920 with partner George S. Kemp. Bryan's brother, J. St. George Bryan, was an associate partner. The firm had offices in Richmond, Petersburg, and Norfolk. It had seats at the Chicago Board of Trade, the New York Cotton Exchange, the New York Curb Market Agency, the New York Stock Exchange, and the Richmond Stock Exchange. The firm operated until Bryan died in 1933. At that time, Bryan's seat on the New York Stock Exchange was transferred to Kemp.

Bryan was the wealthiest member of his family, which was prominent in Virginia. In 1928, the commissioner of the Internal Revenue Service stated that Bryan had an income of $1,049,309. ($19,674,544 in 2023 money). During a United States Board of Tax Appeals hearing, Bryan's attorney maintained his income was $613, 094.

Bryan was the vice president of the Capitol Savings Bank in Richmond and was a director of Southern Railway, the Bank of Commerce and Trust in Richmond, and the Virginia Trust Company.

== Personal life ==
On June 1, 1911, Bryan married Winifred "Duffy" Bryan Hayden of St. Louis, Missouri in New York City. The two met shipboard on a trip to Europe. Their home in Richmond was called Rothesay.

Bryan was a member and vice-president of The Commonwealth Club in Richmond. He was member of the Richmond Association of Alumni of the University of Virginia.

Bryan died at his home from a heart attack on January 15, 1933, at the age of 59. He was buried in the Hollywood Cemetery in Richmond.
