= Columbus, Delaware and Marion Railway =

Interurban railroad in Ohio, US

Columbus, Delaware and Marion Electric Company
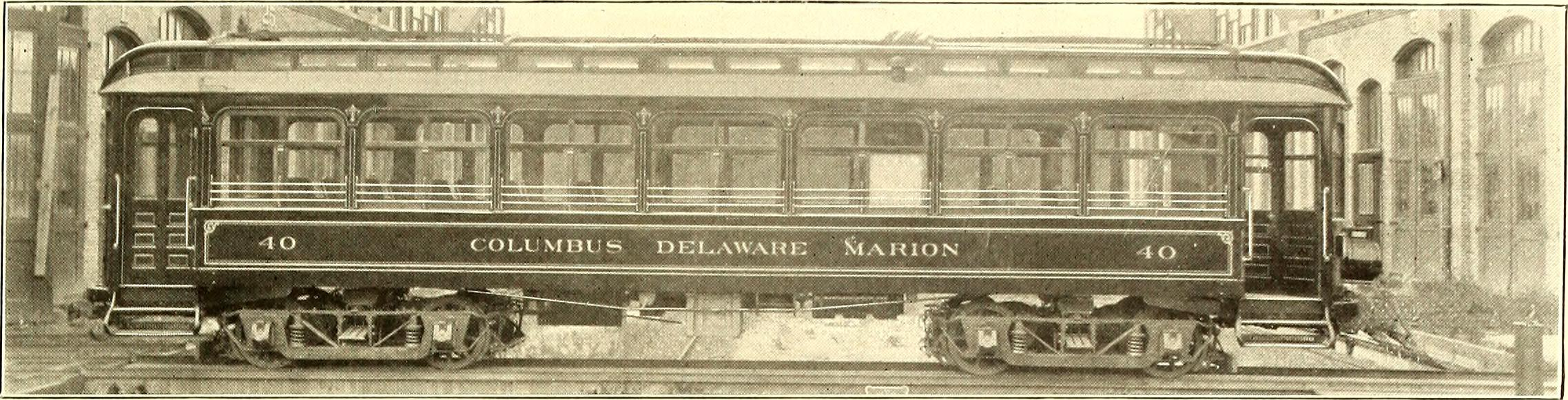
- CD&M car in 1902

Overview
- Headquarters: Marion, Ohio
- Locale: Columbus, Ohio and northern suburbs
- Dates of operation: 1903–1933
- Predecessor: Columbus, Clintonviile and Worthington Street Railway; Columbus, Delaware and Northern Railroad; Delaware Street Railway Company

Technical
- Track gauge: 4 ft 8 1/2 in (1,435 mm) standard gauge
- Length: 80 miles (130 km)

The Columbus, Delaware and Marion Electric Company (originally Columbus, Delaware and Marion Railway Company) or CD&M was an interurban electric railroad that operated passenger and freight service in northern Ohio from 1903 to 1933.

== Railroad and service ==
The Columbus, Delaware and Marion Railway, or CD&M, provided interurban service connecting Columbus, Delaware, Marion, Worthington, and Bucyrus, Ohio. It also provided local street car service in Marion and Delaware.

The CD&M provided local and interurban service on 60 miles (97 km) of track as The Columbus, Delaware and Marion Electric Railway Company. It operated service to Bucyrus through the Delaware, Marion and Bucyrus Railroad on an additional 20 miles (32 km) of track. At Bucyrus the railway met the Cleveland, Southwestern and Columbus Railway for connecting service to Cleveland.

The CD&M also generated electricity for Marion and sold power to the Middle West Utilities System. As a means of increasing off hours riders, the company developed Glenmary Park north of Worthington to attract interurban passengers with playing fields and picnic areas, and provided partial funding for Crystal Lake Amusement Park north of Marion, Ohio.

== History ==
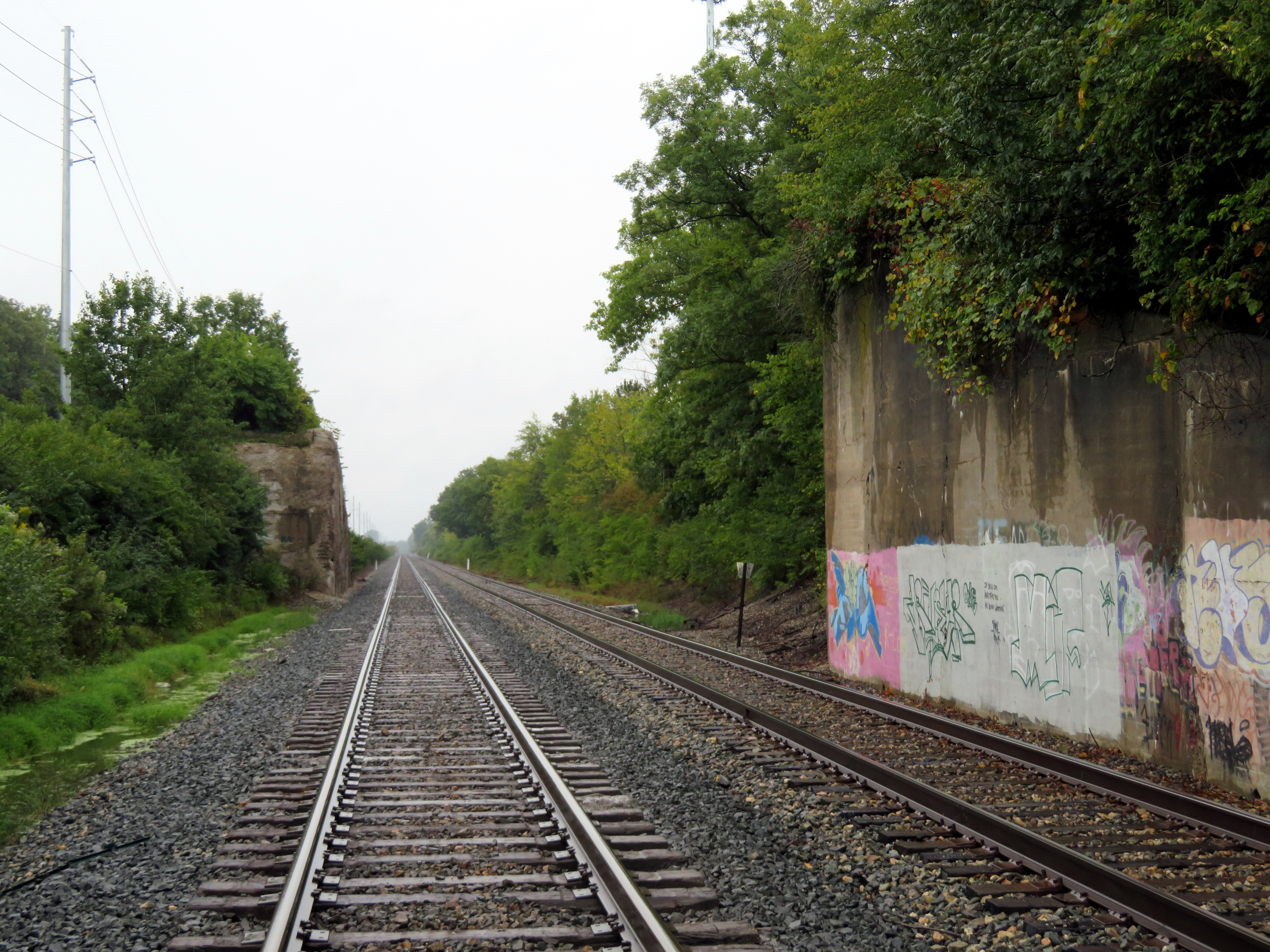
Abutments of a former flyover over what is now the CSX Columbus Subdivision outside Delaware

The Columbus, Delaware, and Marion Railway was formed in 1901 to establish interurban service north of Columbus, Ohio. The CD&M Railway purchased the Columbus, Clinton and Worthington Street Railway. At the same time, a rival company, the Columbus, Delaware and Northern Railroad, acquired a right-of-way between Columbus and Marion. The CD&M Railway bought its rival and the railroad began interurban service in 1903. In October 1904, the CD&M incorporated as a holding company operating through its subsidiary the Columbus, Delaware, and Marion Electric Railroad.

In 1908, the company built the Columbus, Marion, and Bucyrus Railway to connect Columbus to the Cleveland, Southwestern and Columbus Railway at Bucyrus with plans for service to Cleveland, Sandusky, and Toledo. The Columbus Marion and Bucyrus operated passenger service from Columbus to Bucyrus and nightly through freight service between Columbus and Cleveland.

In 1909, both the CD&M Railway Company and its Bucyrus subsidiary went bankrupt. The Columbus, Marion and Bucyrus emerged from bankruptcy in 1914, and in 1917, the CD&M was reorganized as the Columbus, Delaware and Marion Electric Company.

=== Decline and abandonment ===
The Columbus, Marion and Bucyrus Railway lost money during the late 1920s. The railway went bankrupt in 1930 and was absorbed into Columbus, Delaware, and Marion in 1931. In 1931, the Cleveland, Southwestern and Columbus Railway abandoned its rail lines, causing the CD&M to lose revenue from its Cleveland freight service in 1933 The company filed for bankruptcy in March 1933 and abandoned rail passenger service in August 1933. Passenger rail was replaced by bus service. The CD&M Electric Company was merged with the Reserve Power Company to form Marion-Reserve Power Company in 1937.

The Ohio Railway Museum in Worthington operates on about one mile of former Columbus, Delaware and Marion right-of-way. The museum's collection includes a preserved CD&M parlor car numbered 501. Until 1969, another 5.2-mile (8.4 km) segment of CD&M track, leading to a power plant, was used in Marion.

Beginning in 2006, the Marion County Park District was working to establish a trail along the abandoned right of way.
