= Gold Coast Railroad Museum =

Railroad museum in Miami, Florida, United States

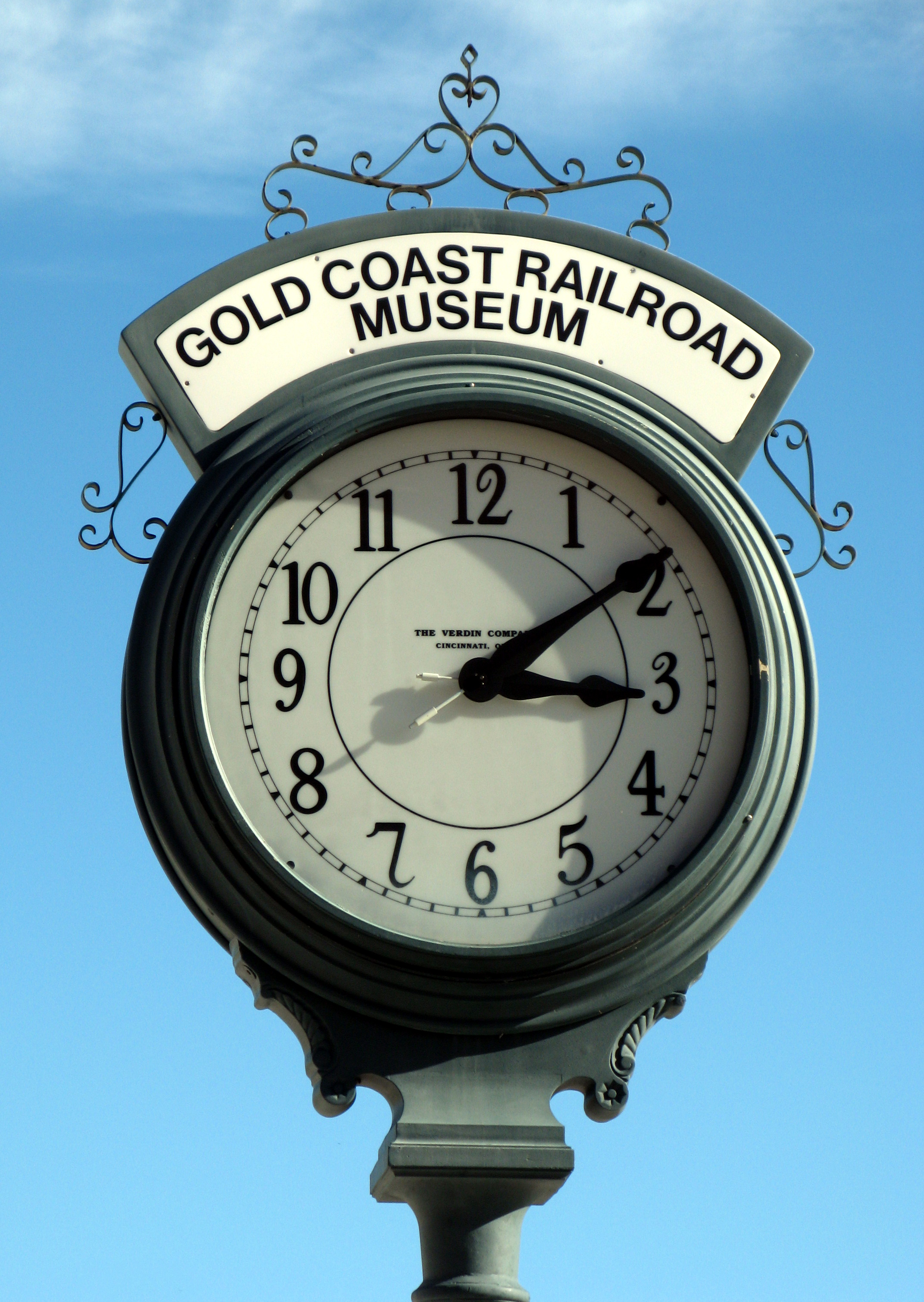

- Location within Florida Location within the United States
- Established: 1957
- Location: Miami, Florida, U.S.
- Coordinates: 25.6172°N 80.4007°W
- Website: www.goldcoastrailroadmuseum.org

The Gold Coast Railroad Museum (reporting mark GCOX) is a railroad museum located in Miami, Florida, adjacent to Zoo Miami.

== Description ==
The Gold Coast Railroad Museum was founded in 1957. The museum was built on the former Naval Air Station Richmond. With over three miles of tracks, the old base was an ideal place to build a railroad museum.

The Gold Coast Railroad Museum is one of three Official State Railroad Museums in Florida. It became a Florida state railroad museum in 1984 when it received statutory recognition by the Florida Legislature as meeting the four statutory criteria, including: its purpose is to preserve railroad history, it is devoted primarily to the history of railroading, it is open to the public, and it operates as a non-profit organization.

The Gold Coast Railroad Museum promotes historical trains and railroads. It houses over 30 historic trains, including historic railroad cars like the Presidential Pullman "Ferdinand Magellan” and engines like the Florida East Coast "153.” The museum strives to teach railroad history using artifacts, movies, and railroading materials. The museum includes many interactive displays.

The museum's train rides allow guests to board vintage trains and get a taste of the past. On most Saturdays, guests can ride in standard gauge railway cars and can also ride in the cab of the train's locomotive. The separate 2 ft (610 mm) narrow gauge Edwin Link Children's Railroad also offers rides.

Located at a latitude of ~25.62 degrees north, the Gold Coast Railroad Museum possesses the southernmost active railroad trackage in the continental United States.

== Equipment ==
The Gold Coast Railroad Museum has over 50 pieces of railroad rolling stock and equipment. Some of the equipment are in the process of being sold to continue to operate a financially stable museum. Some of the equipment on location include the following:

=== Locomotives ===
Locomotive details
Number	Image	Type	Class	Builder	Built	Former owner	Status
1		Diesel	S-2	American Locomotive Company		NASA Railroad	Out of service
2		Diesel	SW1500	Electro-Motive Diesel	1970	NASA Railroad	Operational
48		Steam	0-4-0	American Locomotive Company	1922	Winston Co.	Static display
71		Diesel	S-2 (slug)	American Locomotive Company	1948	Richmond, Fredericksburg and Potomac Railroad	Out of service
106		Diesel	RS-1	American Locomotive Company	1951	Savannah River Site	Out of service
113		Steam	4-6-2	American Locomotive Company	1913	Florida East Coast Railway	Static display
153		Steam	4-6-2	American Locomotive Company	1922	Florida East Coast Railway	Static display
1594		Diesel	E8A	Electro-Motive Diesel		Florida East Coast Railway	Out of service
1804		Diesel	GP7	Electro-Motive Diesel	1951	Atlantic Coast Line Railroad	Out of service
4033		Diesel	FP10	Electro-Motive Diesel		Seaboard Air Line Railroad	Out of service; on display
9913		Diesel	E9A	Electro-Motive Diesel	1956	Chicago, Burlington and Quincy Railroad	Out of service

=== Other locomotives ===
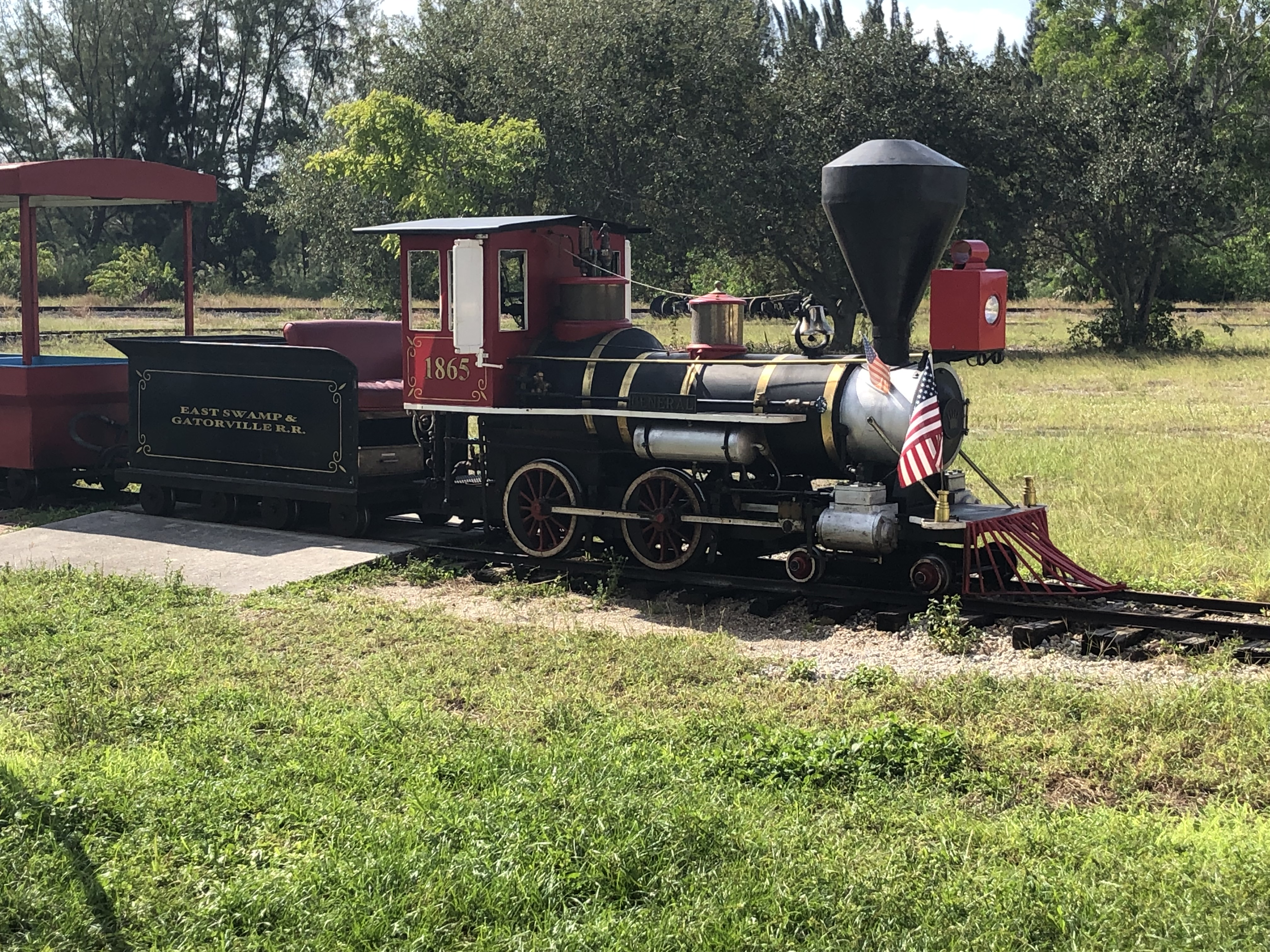
East Swamp and Gatorville Railroad 4-4-0 #1865, December 2022

East Swamp & Gatorville Railroad 2 ft (610 mm) narrow gauge 4-4-0 Locomotive #3. Built by Crown Metal Products; donated by Edwin Albert Link. Originally coal-powered, but now runs on compressed air.

=== Freight and passenger cars ===
The Freight Cars, Passenger Cars & other cars on display include:

- Port Everglades Stake Car No. 1103
- SCL Fruit Boxcar No. 593188
- FEC Heavyweight Passenger No. 136
- ACL Wood M-3 Caboose No. 0322
- SAL Heavyweight Combine No. 259
- US No. 1 "Ferdinand Magellan"
- Southern Railway Express Agency Baggage No. 359
- US Army Hospital Car No. 89436
- FEC Anniversary Smooth-Side Car No. 1996
- ACL Observation-Tavern-Bar No. 254
- SAL Tavern-Lounge No. 6300
- WP "Silver Crescent" CZ-10/WP 881
- CB&Q Sleeper "Silver Vale" No.490
- SAL Diner/Kitchen No. 6112
- CB&Q Sleeper "Silver Slumber" No.4901
- WP Baggage "Silver Stag" No.802
- FEC Lightweight Chair Car "Belle Glade"
- SAL Sleeper/Lounge "Silver Palm" No.54 (Privately Owned)
- CB&Q Baggage "Silver Treasure" No.908 (Privately Owned)
- SCL Waffle-Sided Boxcar No.126307
- Belcher Oil Tank No. 105
- Belcher Oil Tank No. 121
- FRISCO Drop-End Gondola No. 60053
- SCL Self-Driven Steam Crane No.765157
- USAX Flat Car No. 35703
- USAX Air-Dump Car D.66
- Burro Crane No.15
- MHAX Helium Car No.1202
- NASA KSC Railroad Skirt Car No. 171
- Illinois Central Gulf Caboose No.199477
- Metra Gallery Car No.7680
- Metra Gallery Car No.7667
- Metra Gallery Car No.7670
- Metra Gallery Car (Cab Control) No.8723
- Metra Gallery Car (Cab Control) No.8726
- Long Island Rail Road P-72 Commuter Car No.2916
- Illinois Central Gulf Caboose No.199479
- Chessie Steam Special PC-100
- Chesapeake & Ohio Power Car 914101 (Privately Owned)
- ACL Cafe Car "Swarthmore College"
- SCL "Vassar College" No. 765348
- SCL "Cameron Pass" # 765310

== Model railroading ==
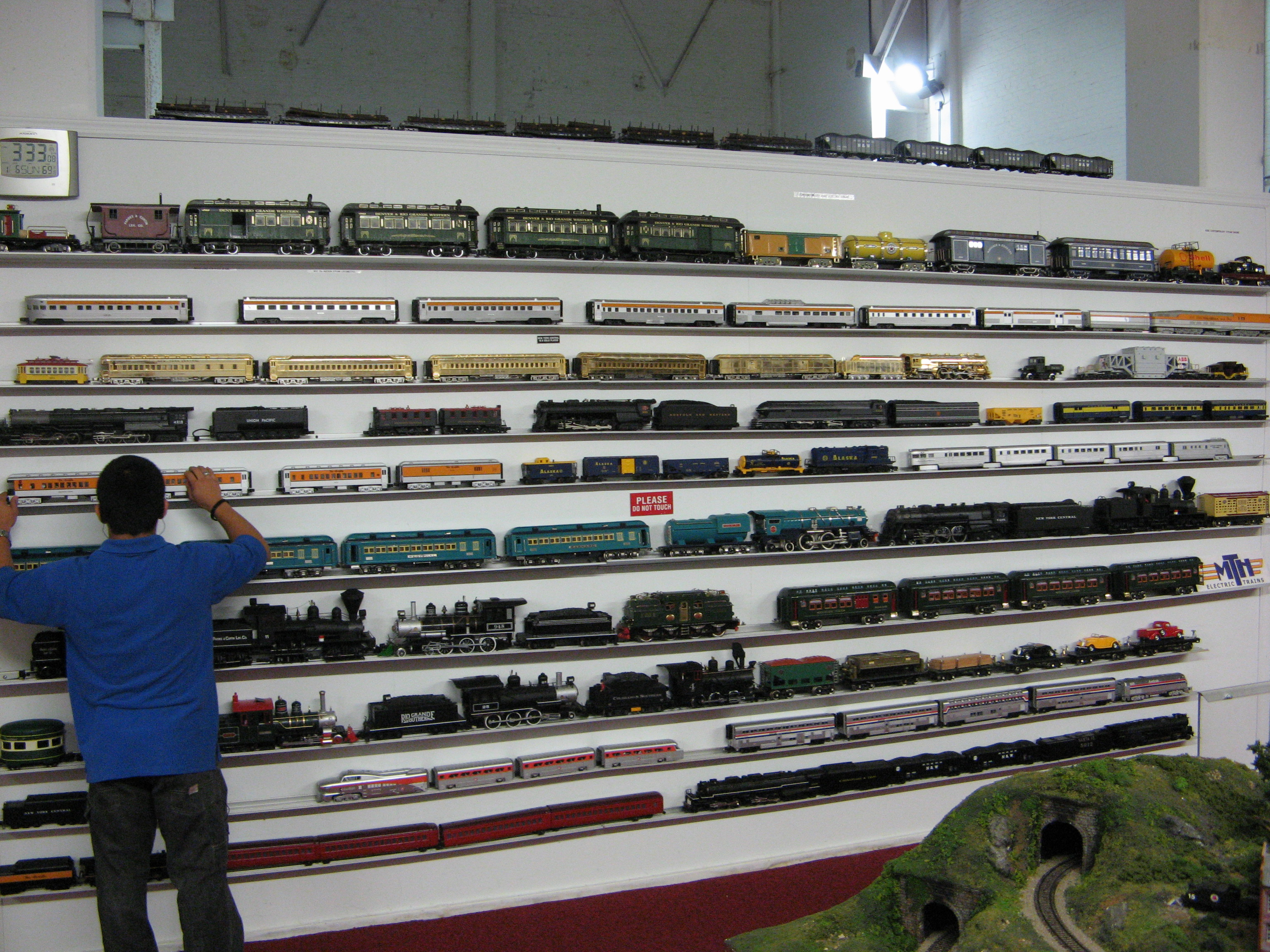
Collection of classic model trains & prototypical scale models

The Gold Coast Railroad Museum exhibits include a number of model railroads in many scales, including N, HO, O27, and G scale. The collections and equipment on display have been donated or loaned to the Museum for the public's enjoyment.

== Hangar 2 Tower ==
Hangar 2 Tower is a cellphone transmission tower on the site of Gold Coast Railroad Museum at 25.617039 N 80.400006 W. It consists of a former 39 metres tall door support of former Hangar 2 of former Richmond Naval Air Station, which burnt down on September 15th, 1945, with a 36 metres tall lattice tower on its top. This lattice tower, which was installed in 2011, carries antennas for police and fire brigade radio service , .

== Publications ==
- Steam N' Steel Newsletter - published monthly
- Model Railroad Magazine - published online

== See also ==
- Florida Railroad Museum
- Royal Palm Railway Experience
