= Toledo, Port Clinton and Lakeside Railway =

The Toledo, Port Clinton and Lakeside Railway was an interurban electrified railway system serving northwestern Ohio's Marblehead Peninsula.

It was incorporated in 1902, began operating in 1905 and only ceased operations in 1958, much later than most other interurbans. It originally linked Genoa with the resort town of Port Clinton, a distance of 23 miles (37 km), and was then extended to Marblehead from Port Clinton, a further 12 miles (19 km). Originally, the railway's cars entered Toledo over the Lake Shore Electric Railway's tracks from an interchange at Genoa, but in 1906 the TPC&L constructed its own line into Toledo, connecting with the city's streetcar system at Starr Avenue. The TPC&L ran over streetcar tracks to Toledo's business district. A further three-mile (4.8 km) extension to the pier at Bay Point in 1911 gave a ferry connection to Sandusky.

== Financing and construction ==
The company was founded and initially financed by a group of successful Toledo, Ohio businessmen led by Theodore Schmitt, who became the firm's first president and invested a substantial proportion of his own money into the venture. Additional funds were acquired through the sale of $1.5 million in bonds at 5% interest. The cost of constructing the line was reported as $1,542,586 in 1909, or $30,425 per mile, which was a high cost for an interurban; this reflected high quality construction especially of the bridges on the line. Despite this, upon delivery of the company's initial batch of rolling stock, tests revealed that they exceeded the loading gauge allowed for passing one another on the dual tracked Toronto streetcar line. Trips were carefully timetabled to avoid two cars passing in that section. While the line had no problems producing an operating profit, the interest payments made for an overall loss at first.

== Supplying electricity ==
Power was provided by the railway's own power-house constructed at Port Clinton, which had a capacity well in excess of that needed for the line. Like many interurban companies, the TPC&L began providing electric power to the on-line communities; the sale of power had become almost a quarter of the company's income by 1912. It was that power business, rather than the railway, which made the company a desirable acquisition target, and in 1912 the company was purchased by W.S. Barstow of New York, who purchased the company and all outstanding bonds, the latter at a rate of 65 cents on the dollar. The new operating company under Barstow's ownership was the Northwestern Ohio Railway and Power Company, a subsidiary of his General Gas and Electric Company.

The new ownership invested to improve the railway's freight business, in new cars, and in building new shops and headquarters in Oak Harbor. The cars were repainted from the TPC&L's plain Pullman green to a livery of bright green and scarlet with gold lettering.

== Traction operation ==
Without the heavy debt load of the original company, the railway turned a regular if small profit in most years. Ridership reached a peak in 1915 and fell steadily thereafter; cost savings through four new lightweight cars and cheaper power kept the company profitable even as the automobile ate into the company's resort traffic. By 1924, ridership was half the 1915 level.

In that year, the company was sold again, to the Cities Service Corporation, mainly once more for its associated power generating business. The line operated as part of the Ohio Public Service Company, the name the cars would bear for a further 21 years. The new company painted the cars in high-visibility "traction orange". The extension to Bay Point was abandoned in 1926. Service levels were cut to only six departures from Toledo a day from a high of fourteen as the Great Depression hit; only three of these traveled the whole line. Single-man operation was adopted to cut costs in 1932. Ridership continued to fall, until in 1938 only 48,900 passengers rode the line, down from 934,055 in the peak year of 1915.

The Toledo streetcar line decided in 1939 to abandon the Starr Avenue route through which the now OPS's cars entered the city. Rather than cut back service to the edge of town, the company decided that ridership levels were insufficient to continue passenger operation. The last run was on July 11, 1939.

Operation continued as a purely freight carrier. Less-than-carload (LCL) freight had ceased in 1935, but carload traffic interchanged with the railroads continued. The line interchanged with the Toledo Terminal Railroad, the Wheeling and Lake Erie Railway, the New York Central Railroad, and the Lakeside and Marblehead Railroad, and did not parallel any of these lines. The majority of traffic was dolomite from a quarry in the area, and coal for a Toledo Edison power plant.

== Separating the power and traction businesses ==
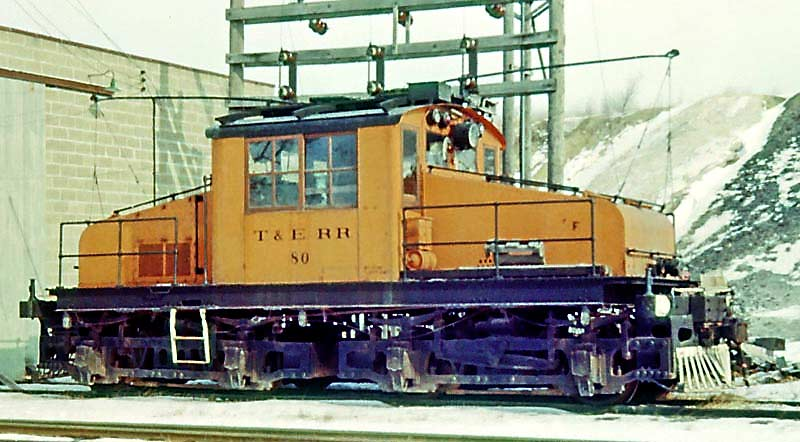
Toledo and Eastern steeplecab No. 80.

In 1944, the Ohio Public Service Company was forced to divest itself of its railway operations under the 1935 Public Utility Holding Company Act. Local scrap dealer L.P. Kulka purchased the line and began to operate it as the Toledo and Eastern Railroad. He sold it in 1951 to the Standard Slag Company, who in turn sold it in 1953 to Lloyd B. Lyon. The line was highly profitable in these years, but in 1957 the power company began to receive most of its coal by boat and the quarry began shipping via the New York Central. This was 95 percent of the company's traffic.

The company filed for abandonment on January 10, 1958, which was approved on March 13; operations ceased on July 16.

Niles-built passenger car #21 was the first piece of equipment obtained in 1948 by the fledgling Ohio Railway Museum, and is a rare example of a wooden-bodied interurban car still in operating condition. Car #64, a Kuhlman lightweight, is also at that museum.
