= Florida East Coast 153 =

Preserved American 4-6-2 locomotive

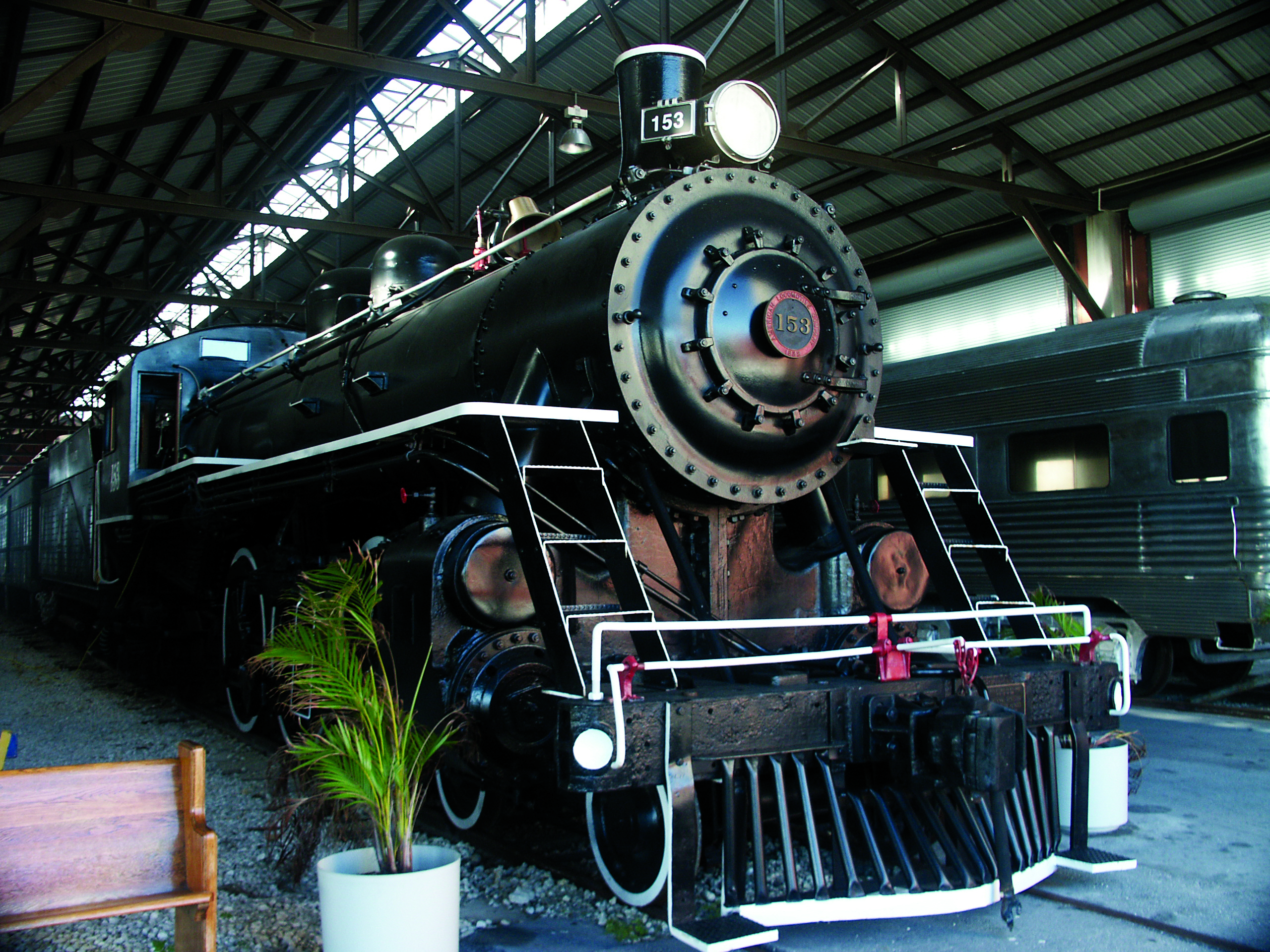
- FEC 153 on display at the Gold Coast Railroad Museum in 2003
Type and origin
- Power type: Steam
- Builder: American Locomotive Company
- Serial number: 63262
- Build date: 1922
Specifications
- Configuration
  - Whyte: 4-6-2
  - UIC: 2′C1′ h
- Gauge: 4 ft 8 1/2 in (1,435 mm)
- Driver dia.: 68 in (1.727 m)
- Adhesive weight: 126,500 lb (57.4 t)
- Loco weight: 204,000 lb (92.5 t)
- Tender weight: 162,000 lb (73.5 t)
- Fuel type: Oil
- Fuel capacity: 3,500 US gallons (13,000 L; 2,900 imp gal)
- Water cap.: 7,300 US gallons (28,000 L; 6,100 imp gal)
- Firebox
  - Grate area: 47.1 sq ft (4.4 m^{2})
- Boiler pressure: 180 lbf/in^{2} (1.24 MPa)
- Heating surface
  - Firebox: 160 sq ft (14.9 m^{2})
- Superheater
  - Heating area: 440 sq ft (40.9 m^{2})
- Cylinders: Two
- Cylinder size: 22 in × 26 in (559 mm × 660 mm)
- Valve gear: Walschaerts
- Valve type: 11-inch (279 mm) piston valves
Performance figures
- Tractive effort: 28,314 lbf (125.9 kN)
- Factor of adh.: 4.47
Career
- Operators: Florida East Coast Railway (1922-1938); U.S. Sugar (1940-1956); University of Miami (1956-1966)
- Class: 151
- Power class: 77
- Numbers: 153
- Retired: 1956 (revenue service); 1992 (excursion service)
- Restored: 1957
- Current owner: Gold Coast Railroad Museum
- Disposition: On static display, based in Miami, Florida

Florida East Coast 153 is a Florida East Coast Railway 4-6-2 ALCO steam locomotive located in Miami, Florida, US.

== History ==
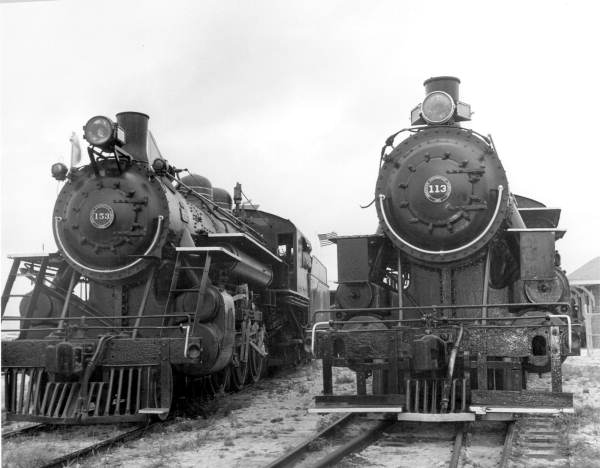
FEC #153 (left), alongside FEC #113 (right), at Fort Lauderdale, around the 1970s

The locomotive served on the Florida East Coast Railway from 1922 to 1938 and pulled a train carrying President Calvin Coolidge to Miami in 1928. In 1935, when it was in use on the run between Miami and Key West, No. 153 was one of the last locomotives to reach Miami before the hurricane that year destroyed the bridges to the Florida Keys.

After 1938, No. 153 was used as an industrial switcher by the United States Sugar Corporation of Clewiston, Florida. In 1956, it was donated to the University of Miami.

From March 1957 until November 1966, it operated a train called Gold Coast Special in Miami every Sunday. In 1966, it received a major overhaul, after which it was inspected and subsequently certified by the Interstate Commerce Commission.

For pulling the "rescue train" out of Marathon before the Labor Day Hurricane, #153 was added to the U.S. National Register of Historic Places on February 21, 1985. Due to age and damage by Hurricane Andrew in 1992, it's been out of service since. It is located at the Gold Coast Railroad Museum, 12400 Southwest 152nd Street, Miami, FL.

== See also ==
- U.S. Sugar 148
- Florida East Coast 80
