= Joseph Bryan (publisher) =

American publisher and industrialist (1845–1908)

- Born: August 13, 1845; Eagle Point, Gloucester County, Virginia, U.S.
- Died: November 20, 1908 (aged 63); Richmond, Virginia, U.S.
- Occupations: Publisher, industrialist
- Known for: Ownership of the Richmond Times-Dispatch
- Spouse: Isabel Maury
- Children: 6, including John Stewart Bryan

Joseph Bryan (August 13, 1845 – November 20, 1908) was an American publisher and industrialist from Richmond, Virginia. He was associated with the development of Richmond’s newspaper industry and later business ventures in manufacturing. Bryan owned the Richmond Daily Times, which was later consolidated into the Richmond Times-Dispatch. His family remained involved in journalism and education in Virginia during the twentieth century.

== Early life and education ==
Bryan was born at Eagle Point in Gloucester County, Virginia, on August 13, 1845, to John Randolph Bryan and Elizabeth Tucker Coalter Bryan. He attended the Episcopal High School in Alexandria and later studied at the University of Virginia where he was a brother of the Phi Kappa Psi Fraternity. During the American Civil War, he served in the Confederate partisan unit known as Mosby’s Rangers.

== Career ==
After the war, Bryan practiced law and invested in industrial businesses in Richmond. In 1887, he purchased the Richmond Daily Times from businessman Lewis Ginter. Under his ownership, the paper expanded its circulation and influence in the Richmond area. It later merged with other publications to form the Richmond Times-Dispatch.

Bryan also held interests in several manufacturing and transportation firms in the city, contributing to Richmond’s economic recovery after the Civil War. He owned the Richmond Locomotive Works, which had more than 3,000 employees and made as many 200 locomotives a year. He sold the business in 1900, but remained its CEO.

== Civic involvement ==
Bryan participated in various civic and charitable efforts in Richmond. His widow, Isabel Maury Bryan, donated a tract of family land to the city after his death, which became Joseph Bryan Park. The park was dedicated in his memory in 1910. Bryan also supported local educational and religious organizations during his lifetime.

== Personal life ==
Bryan married Isabel Maury of Fredericksburg, Virginia. They had six children, including John Stewart Bryan, who succeeded his father as publisher of the Times-Dispatch and later served as president of the University of Richmond, and Jonathan Bryan who was president of the Richmond-Ashland Railway Company and the Bryan, Kemp & Co. brokerage firm.

Joseph Bryan died in Richmond on November 20, 1908. He was buried in Hollywood Cemetery.

== Legacy ==
Bryan is remembered primarily for his role in Richmond’s newspaper consolidation and his family’s ongoing involvement in Virginia media and education. His business and civic activities have been documented in several local histories and archives, including the Library of Virginia’s Bryan Family Papers.
