= List of Virginia state symbols =

Location of the Commonwealth of Virginia in the United States of America

This is a list of symbols of the United States Commonwealth of Virginia. Most of the items in the list are officially recognized symbols created by an act of the Virginia General Assembly and signed into law by the governor. The state nickname, The Old Dominion, is the oldest symbol. However, it, as well as Virginia's other nicknames, are not official. The nickname "Mother of Presidents" is also historic, as eight Virginians have served as President of the United States, including four of the first five: George Washington, Thomas Jefferson, James Madison, James Monroe, William Henry Harrison, John Tyler, Zachary Taylor, and Woodrow Wilson. Additionally, the nickname "Mother of States" comes from being the first state settled in the United States. As well, Sam Houston, president of the Republic of Texas, Fulwar Skipwith, the president of the Republic of West Florida, and Joseph Jenkins Roberts, the first president of Liberia were from Virginia.

The state motto and seal have been official since Virginia declared its independence from the Kingdom of Great Britain. Virginia is one of only two states (the other being Mississippi with the Magnolia) to have the same plant for state flower and state tree, the Flowering Dogwood. Most of the symbols were made official in the late 20th century.

== Insignia ==
Type	Symbol	Description	Year	Image	Source
Flag	Flag of Virginia	Defined as: The flag of the Commonwealth shall hereafter be made of bunting or merino. It shall be a deep blue field, with a circular white centre of the same material. Upon this circle shall be painted or embroidered, to show on both sides alike, the coat of arms of the Commonwealth, as described in § 7.1-26 for the obverse of the great seal of the Commonwealth; and there shall be a white silk fringe on the outer edge, furthest from the flagstaff. This shall be known and respected as the flag of Virginia. (Code 1950, § 7-32; 1966, c. 102.) First made in 1833, it was not adopted until 1861. The flag was last updated in 1950.	1950	The Virginian flag, which features a complex seal with a woman standing on the body of a man she has killed, in a blue field background	
Motto	Sic semper tyrannis (Thus always to tyrants)	Proposed by George Mason to be included in the State Seal in 1776. Translated from Latin as "Thus Always to Tyrants", meaning that tyrants will eventually be overthrown. A joke dating back to the Civil War states that the motto means "Get your foot off my neck", referencing the seal. The motto is included in the legislature for the state seal.	1776	An oval with a drawing of a woman standing on the body of a man she has killed	
Nicknames	Old Dominion	A popular legend states that Charles II referred to Virginia as the Old Dominion for their loyalty to the English crown. The Colony of Virginia's motto, En dat Virginia quintam (Behold, Virginia gives the fifth) refers to the claim of Virginia as England's 5th Dominion, after England, France, Scotland, and Ireland. Virginia has a public university called Old Dominion University.	Traditional	Seal of Arms of the Colony of Virginia. En dat Virginia Quintam is written on the bottom.	
Nicknames	Mother of Presidents	8 United States presidents have been born in Virginia: George Washington, Thomas Jefferson, James Madison, James Monroe, William Henry Harrison, John Tyler, Zachary Taylor, and Woodrow Wilson.	Traditional		
Nicknames	Mother of States	Since its settlement in 1606, Virginia has been carved into eight more states: Illinois, Indiana, Kentucky, Michigan, Minnesota, Ohio, West Virginia, and Wisconsin.	Traditional		
Seal	Seal of Virginia	Defined as: The great seal of the Commonwealth of Virginia shall consist of two metallic discs, two and one-fourth inches in diameter, with an ornamental border one fourth of an inch wide, with such words and figures engraved thereon as will, when used, produce impressions to be described as follows: On the obverse, Virtus, the genius of the Commonwealth, dressed as an Amazon, resting on a spear in her right hand, point downward, touching the earth; and holding in her left hand, a sheathed sword, or parazonium, pointing upward; her head erect and face upturned; her left foot on the form of Tyranny represented by the prostrate body of a man, with his head to her left, his fallen crown nearby, a broken chain in his left hand, and a scourge in his right. Above the group and within the border conforming therewith, shall be the word "Virginia", and, in the space below, on a curved line, shall be the motto, "Sic Semper Tyrannis." On the reverse, shall be placed a group consisting of Libertas, holding a wand and pileus in her right hand; on her right, Aeternitas, with a globe and phoenix in her right hand; on the left of Libertas, Ceres, with a cornucopia in her left hand, and an ear of wheat in her right; over this device, in a curved line, the word "Perseverando." (Code 1950, § 7-26; 1966, c. 102.) The seal was called for during the convention of 1776, and designed by George Wythe. The seal is prominently featured on the state flag.	1776 (Standardized in 1950)	A complex seal with a woman standing on the body of a man she has killed	
Slogan	Virginia Is for Lovers	Stylized in all caps as "Virginia is for Lo❤ers". The slogan was designed by the Martin Agency in 1969, who had initially used the slogan separately as "Virginia is for History lovers", "Virginia is for Beach lovers", and "Virginia is for Mountain lovers". After the ads were found to be too limiting, they were merged into the current slogan. The slogan is popular within both United States and Virginia culture, used in Virginia's license plates and welcome signs, and as a slogan for the Virginia Department of Elections and Hillary Clinton's 2016 presidential campaign. The slogan was added into the Madison Avenue Advertising Walk of Fame in 2009, and was named as one of the top ten advertising campaigns of all time by Forbes.	1969	A wordmark reading "VIRGINIA IS FOR LO❤️ERS", where the heart sign resembles a "V"	

== Flora ==
Type	Symbol	Description	Year	Image	Source
Flower	American Dogwood (Cornus florida)	Thomas Jefferson grew American Dogwood on his Monticello estate. Legislators chose the plant as the official flower in 1918 to "Stimulate an interest in the history and traditions of the Commonwealth". American Dogwood are common in the East Coast.	1918	American Dogwood	
Tree	American Dogwood (Cornus florida)	The American Dogwood was chosen as the state tree 38 years after it was adopted as the state flower.	1956	American Dogwood	

== Fauna ==
Type	Symbol	Description	Year	Image
Bat	Virginia Big-Eared Bat (Corynorhinos townsendii virginianus)	The Virginia Big-Eared Bat is only found in Virginia, West Virginia, Kentucky, and North Carolina. They are labelled as endangered, with about 20,000 left in the wild. Legislators chose the bat for its name and endangered status. Governor Mark Warner stated that the state bat "is no more absurd" than the state beverage.	2005	Virginia Big-Eared Bat
Bird	Northern Cardinal (Cardinalis cardinalis)	The Northern Cardinal is common from the East Coast to the Central United States. The bird was chosen "because of its bright plumage and cheerful song” said Virginia State Senator Adam Ebbin. The Northern Cardinal is also the state bird of Indiana, Kentucky, North Carolina, Ohio, and West Virginia.	1950	Northern Cardinal
Dog	American Foxhound (Canis lupus familiaris)		1966	American Foxhound
Fresh Water Fish	Brook trout (Salvelinus fontinalis)		1993	Brook trout
Insect	Tiger Swallowtail Butterfly (Papilio glaucus)		1991	Tiger Swallowtail Butterfly
Pollinator	European honey bee (Apis mellifera)		2024	A bee standing on a flower, covered in pollen
Pony	Chincoteague Pony (Equus caballus)		2023	Chincoteague Pony
Salamander	Red Salamander (Pseudotriton ruber)		2018	Red Salamander
Salt Water Fish	Striped Bass (Morone saxatilis)		2011	Striped Bass
Shell	Eastern oyster (Crassostrea virginica)		1974	Eastern oyster
Snake	Eastern garter snake (Thamnophis sirtalis sirtalis)		2016	Eastern garter snake

== Geology ==
Type	Symbol	Year	Image
Fossil	Chesapecten jeffersonius	1993	Chesapecten jeffersonius
Rock	Nelsonite	2016	A speckled rock with black and white grains

== Culture ==
Type	Symbol	Year	Image
Boat	Chesapeake Bay deadrise	1988	A number of boats in a harbor
Drink	Milk	1982	Milk
Folk dance	Square dance	1991	Square dancers
Gold Mining Interpretive Center	Monroe Park	2001	
Maple Festival	Highland County Maple Festival	2014	
Motor Sports Museum	Wood Brothers Racing Museum and Virginia Motor Sports Hall of Fame	1995	
Opry	Virginia Opry	2020	
Outdoor Drama	The Trail of the Lonesome Pine Outdoor Drama	1994	
Outdoor Drama	The Long Way Home (Historical)	1994	
Shakespeare Festival	Virginia Shakespeare Festival	2013	
Songs	Carry Me Back to Old Virginny (Emeritus)	1997	
Songs	Sweet Virginia Breeze (Popular)	2015	
Songs	Our Great Virginia (Traditional)	2015	
Spirit	George Washington's Rye Whiskey	2017	Milk
Sports hall of fame	Virginia Sports Hall of Fame	1996	
Steam locomotive	Norfolk and Western 611	2017	Norfolk and Western 611
Television Series	"Song of the Mountains"	2017	
War Memorial Museum	Virginia War Museum	1997	Norfolk and Western 611

== Notes ==
^{C} The Virginia Colony was nicknamed "The Old Dominion" by King Charles II for its perceived loyalty to the English monarchy during the English Civil War.

^{D} Pictures of Virginia license plates throughout the years can be found here.

^{E} In 1940, Virginia made "Carry Me Back to Old Virginny" the state song, but it was retired in 1997 and reclassified as the state song emeritus.

== See also ==
- List of Virginia-related topics
