= Draketail =

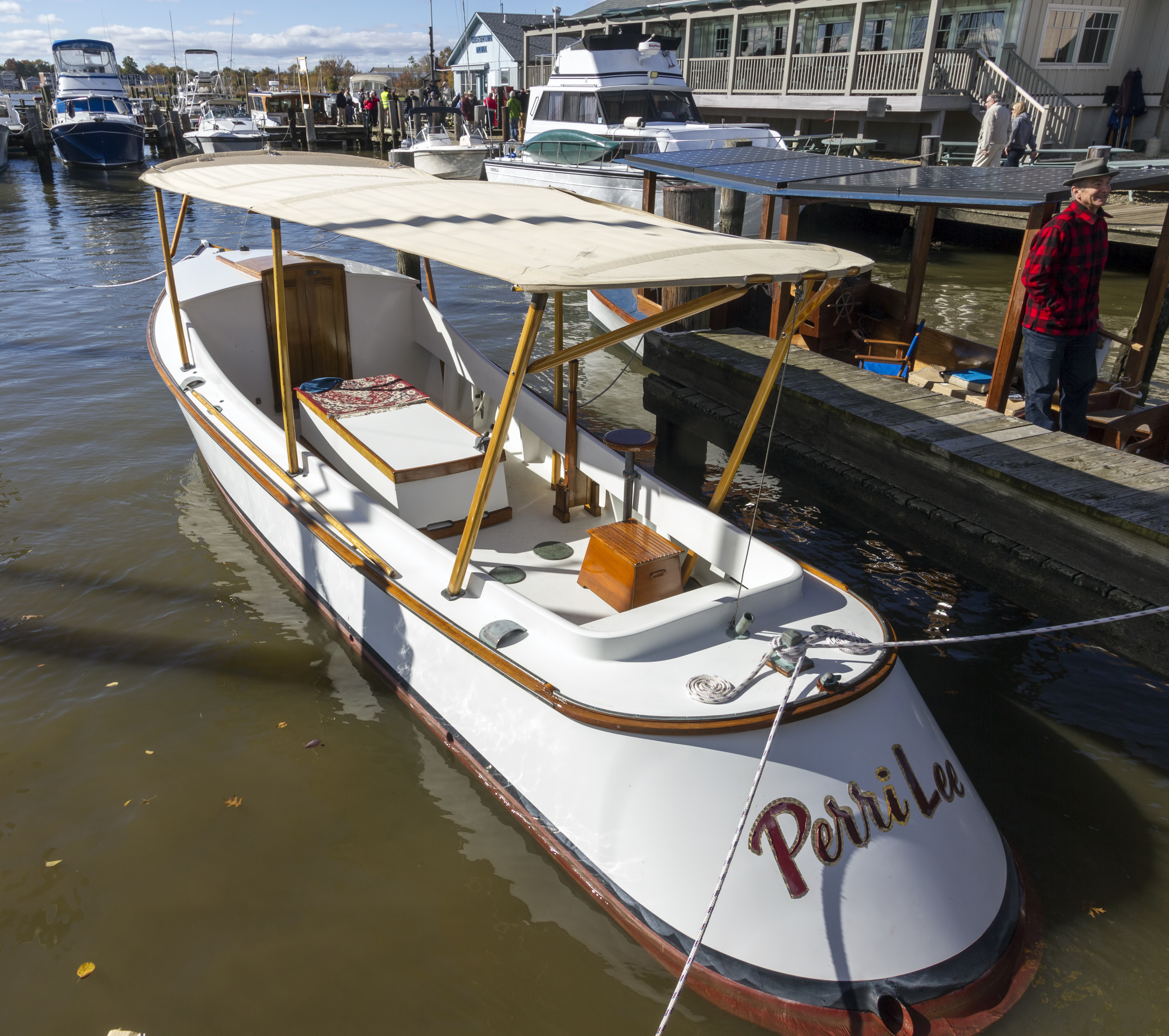
Replica draketail skiff

A draketail is a Chesapeake Bay boat that features a sloping transom that meets the waterline at a sharp angle, usually rounded in plan. The feature could be found in 1920s workboats such as the Chesapeake Bay deadrise and in smaller skiffs. The configuration was inspired by World War I destroyer designs.
