= List of U.S. state ships =

This is a list of official U.S. state ships as designated by each state's legislature.

== Table ==
State	Ship	Image	Year designated
California	Californian (state tall ship)		2003
Connecticut	USS Nautilus (SSN-571)		1983
Connecticut	Freedom Schooner Amistad (state flagship and tall ship ambassador)		2003
Delaware	Kalmar Nyckel (state tall ship)		2016
Florida	SS American Victory (state flagship)		2026
Massachusetts	Schooner Ernestina (vessel of the commonwealth)		1994
Maryland	Skipjack (state boat)		1985
Maine	Bowdoin (state sailing vessel)		1987
New Jersey	A. J. Meerwald (state tall ship)		1998
North Carolina	Shad boat (state historical boat)		1987
Ohio	USS Ohio (SSGN-726)		1981
Pennsylvania	U.S. Brig Niagara (flagship of the commonwealth)		1988
Rhode Island	SSV Oliver Hazard Perry (flagship and tall ship ambassador)		2018
Rhode Island	12-meter Yacht Courageous (winner of 1974 & 1977 America's Cup)		2000
Texas	USS Texas (BB-35)		1995
Texas	Elissa (state tall ship)		2005
Utah	USS Utah (BB-31)		
Virginia	Chesapeake Bay deadrise (state boat)		
Washington	MV President Washington (became the MV Mahimahi)		1983
Washington	Lady Washington		2007

== See also ==
- List of U.S. state, district, and territorial insignia
