= Norfolk and Western 611 =

Preserved American 4-8-4 steam locomotive based in Virginia

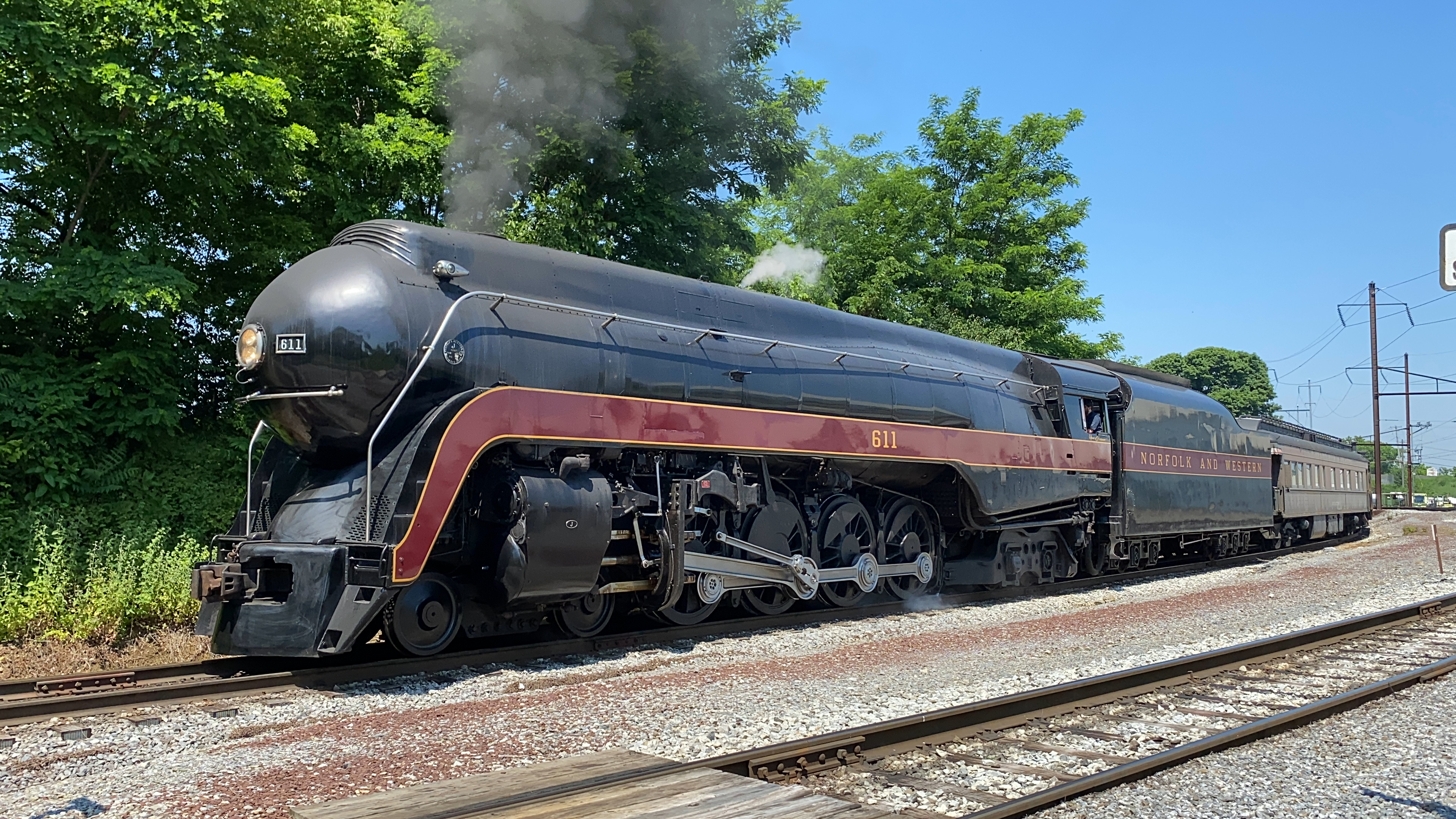
- Norfolk and Western No. 611 pulling a Strasburg Rail Road excursion train back to Strasburg, Pennsylvania, June 6, 2021.
Type and origin
- Power type: Steam
- Designer: H.W. Reynolds; G.P. McGavock; C.H. Faris; Franklin C. Noel
- Builder: Roanoke Shops (East End Shops)
- Serial number: 388
- Build date: May 29, 1950
Specifications
- Configuration
  - Whyte: 4-8-4
  - UIC: 2′D2′ h2
- Gauge: 4 ft 8 1/2 in (1,435 mm) standard gauge
- Leading dia.: 36 in (914 mm)
- Driver dia.: 70 in (1,778 mm)
- Trailing dia.: 42 in (1,067 mm)
- Tender wheels: 33 in (838 mm)
- Length: 109 ft 2 in (33.27 m)
- Width: 11 ft 2 in (3.40 m)
- Height: 16 ft (4.88 m)
- Axle load: 72,000 lb (32.7 tonnes) for drivers
- Adhesive weight: 288,000 lb (130.6 tonnes)
- Loco weight: 494,000 lb (224.1 tonnes)
- Tender weight: 378,600 lb (171.7 tonnes)
- Total weight: 872,600 lb (395.8 tonnes)
- Tender type: 22D
- Fuel type: Coal
- Fuel capacity: 35 short tons (70,000 lb)
- Water cap.: 20,000 US gallons (76,000 L)
- Fuel consumption: 6.5 short tons (5.9 t) of coal per hour 11,880 US gallons (45,000 L) of water per hour
- Firebox
  - Grate area: 107.7 sq ft (10.01 m^{2})
- Boiler: 92 in (2,337 mm) (front); 102 in (2,591 mm) (back)
- Boiler pressure: 300 psi (2.07 MPa)
- Feedwater heater: Worthington 6-SA
- Heating surface
  - Firebox: 578 sq ft (53.7 m^{2})
  - Tubes: 2.25 in (57 mm)
  - Flues: 3.5 in (89 mm)
  - Tubes and flues: 4,693 sq ft (436.0 m^{2})
  - Total surface: 5,271 sq ft (489.7 m^{2})
- Superheater
  - Type: Elesco Type E
  - Heating area: 2,177 sq ft (202.2 m^{2})
- Cylinders: Two, outside
- Cylinder size: 27 in × 32 in (686 mm × 813 mm)
- Valve gear: Baker
- Valve type: 14-inch (356 mm) Piston valves, 8.5-inch (216 mm) travel
- Loco brake: Air
- Train brakes: Air
- Couplers: Knuckle
Performance figures
- Power output: 5,100 hp (3,800 kW) @ tender drawbar @ 40 mph (64 km/h)
- Tractive effort: 80,000 lbf (355.86 kN)
- Factor of adh.: 3.6
Career
- Operators: Norfolk and Western Railway; Norfolk Southern Railway; Virginia Museum of Transportation (Fire Up 611! Committee)
- Class: J
- Number in class: 12th of 14
- Numbers: N&W 611
- Nicknames: The Spirit of Roanoke; The Queen of Steam
- Locale: Mid-Atlantic
- Retired: October 27, 1959 (revenue service); December 7, 1994 (1st excursion service)
- Preserved: May 1962
- Restored: August 14, 1982 (1st excursion service); May 9, 2015 (2nd excursion service)
- Current owner: Virginia Museum of Transportation
- Disposition: Operational
- Norfolk & Western Class J No. 611 Locomotive
- U.S. National Register of Historic Places
- Location within Virginia Location within the United States
- Location: 303 Norfolk Avenue SW, Roanoke, Virginia
- Coordinates: 37.272943°N 79.947231°W
- Built: 1950
- Built by: Roanoke Shops
- NRHP reference No.: 100009961
- Added to NRHP: February 8, 2024

Norfolk and Western 611, also known as the "Spirit of Roanoke" and the "Queen of Steam", is the only surviving example of Norfolk and Western's (N&W) class J 4-8-4 type "Northern" streamlined steam locomotives. Built in May 1950 at N&W's Roanoke (East End) Shops in Roanoke, Virginia, it was the twelfth member of its class and was also one of the last mainline passenger steam locomotives built in the United States, representing a pinnacle of American steam locomotive technology.

No. 611 hauled N&W's premier passenger trains between Norfolk, Virginia, and Cincinnati, Ohio; and ferried Southern Railway's (SOU) passenger trains through the Blue Ridge Mountains between Monroe and Bristol, Virginia. Retired from revenue service in 1959, No. 611 was donated to the Roanoke City Council and put on display at the Virginia Museum of Transportation (VMT), where it became the sole survivor of the 14 class J locomotives.

In 1982, No. 611 was restored to operation by N&W successor Norfolk Southern (NS). It became the mainline star of the railroad's steam program, pulling excursion trains as far south as Florida, as far north as New York, and as far west as Illinois and Missouri. In late 1994, when liability insurance costs led NS to end its steam program, the locomotive was again retired and moved back to the VMT. In 2012, No. 611 was officially donated to the VMT.

In 2015, after a year of restoration at the North Carolina Transportation Museum (NCTM) in Spencer, North Carolina, No. 611 returned to mainline excursion service as part of the NS 21st Century Steam program until that program ended in 2017. No. 611 has since been operated by the VMT in excursion service and as a traveling exhibit, spending time at the NCTM and Strasburg Rail Road (SRC) in Strasburg, Pennsylvania, and since 2023, pulling Virginia Scenic Railway excursions on the Buckingham Branch Railroad, out of Staunton, Virginia.

Frequently invoked as an icon of Roanoke and its railroading history, No. 611 was declared a National Historic Mechanical Engineering Landmark by the American Society of Mechanical Engineers (ASME) in 1984 and was designated the official state steam locomotive of Virginia by the Virginia General Assembly in 2017. It was added to the Virginia Landmarks Register by the Virginia Department of Historic Resources (DHR) in 2023. No. 611 was listed on the National Register of Historic Places in 2024 and rededicated as an ASME landmark in 2025.

== History ==
=== Background ===
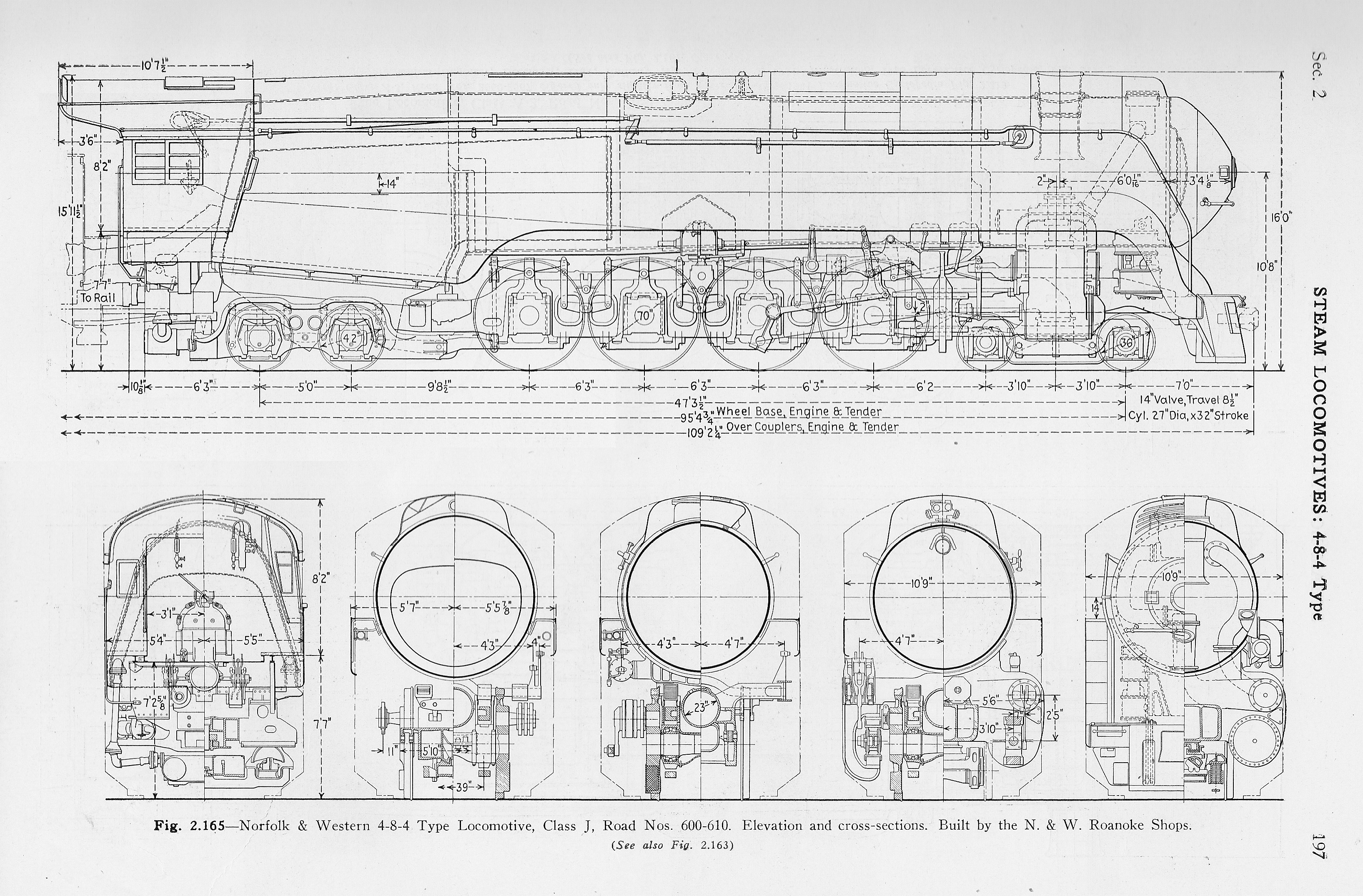
A drawing design of the N&W class J locomotive.

Before the U.S. entered World War II, the Norfolk and Western Railway's mechanical engineering team developed a new locomotive, the streamlined class J 4-8-4 Northern, to handle rising mainline passenger traffic over the Blue Ridge Mountains, especially on steep grades in Virginia and West Virginia. The N&W built five locomotives, Nos. 600-604, at the Roanoke (East End) Shops in Roanoke, Virginia, in 1941 and 1942. They were painted black with a Tuscan red stripe wrapped with dulux gold linings and letterings. The next batch, Nos. 605-610, were built in 1943 without streamlined casings due to wartime restrictions; these were classified as J1s. A year later, the J1s were refitted with the casings and reclassified as Js.

The class Js were the most powerful 4-8-4 passenger steam locomotives ever built, with 70 in (1,778 mm) driving wheels, 80,000 lbf (355.86 kN) of tractive effort, and an operating boiler pressure of 300 psi (2.07 MPa). (Note: The first 11 class J locomotives initially produced 275 psi (1.90 MPa), which provided 733,000 lbf (3,260.55 kN) of tractive effort. Their boiler pressure was raised to 300 psi (2.07 MPa) in late 1945 to operate more efficiently.) They had Timken roller bearings on all axles, including the tender axles, which enabled a smooth run and quicker acceleration and allowed them to be moved by four people with a rope. Their 22D-type tenders hold 35 short tons (70,000 lb) of coal and 20,000 US gallons (76,000 L) of water. (Note: The first 11 class J locomotives' tenders originally hold 26 short tons (52,000 lb) of coal and 22,000 US gallons (83,000 L) of water. In the mid-1940s, they were later changed to 35 short tons (70,000 lb) and 20,000 US gallons (76,000 L), respectively due to multiple water stops on the N&W mainline.) They consumed 6.5 short tons (13,000 lb) of coal and 11,860 US gallons (44,900 L) of water per hour. The locomotives were equipped with a Hancock long-bell 3-chime "steamboat" whistle.

The class Js were among the N&W's most reliable steam locomotives; they ran evenly on its mountainous and relatively short route at an average speed of 40 mph (64 km/h), producing 5,100 hp (3,800 kW) at the tender drawbar. On flat terrain, the class J locomotives could haul a 1,025 short tons (2,050,000 lb) passenger train of 15 cars at 110 mph (177 km/h). Theoretically, they could go up to 140 mph (225 km/h) without wheel slippage. They generally operated about 500 miles (800 km) per day and 15,000 miles (24,000 km) per month.

The railroad built the last three locomotives, Nos. 611-613, in the summer of 1950, bringing the total to 14 class Js. They were the last passenger steam locomotives built by the N&W and the last mainline passenger steam locomotives built in the United States. (Note: Their bells were mounted behind the pilot on the fireman's side, while the bells on Nos. 600-610 were initially mounted on top of their boilers. In 1953, Nos. 600-610's bells were moved behind the pilot on the fireman's side.) Around 1955, all of the class J locomotives were given a pair of access holes in their streamlined front end, underneath the bullet nose, to ventilate the cross-compound air pumps from behind.

=== Revenue service ===
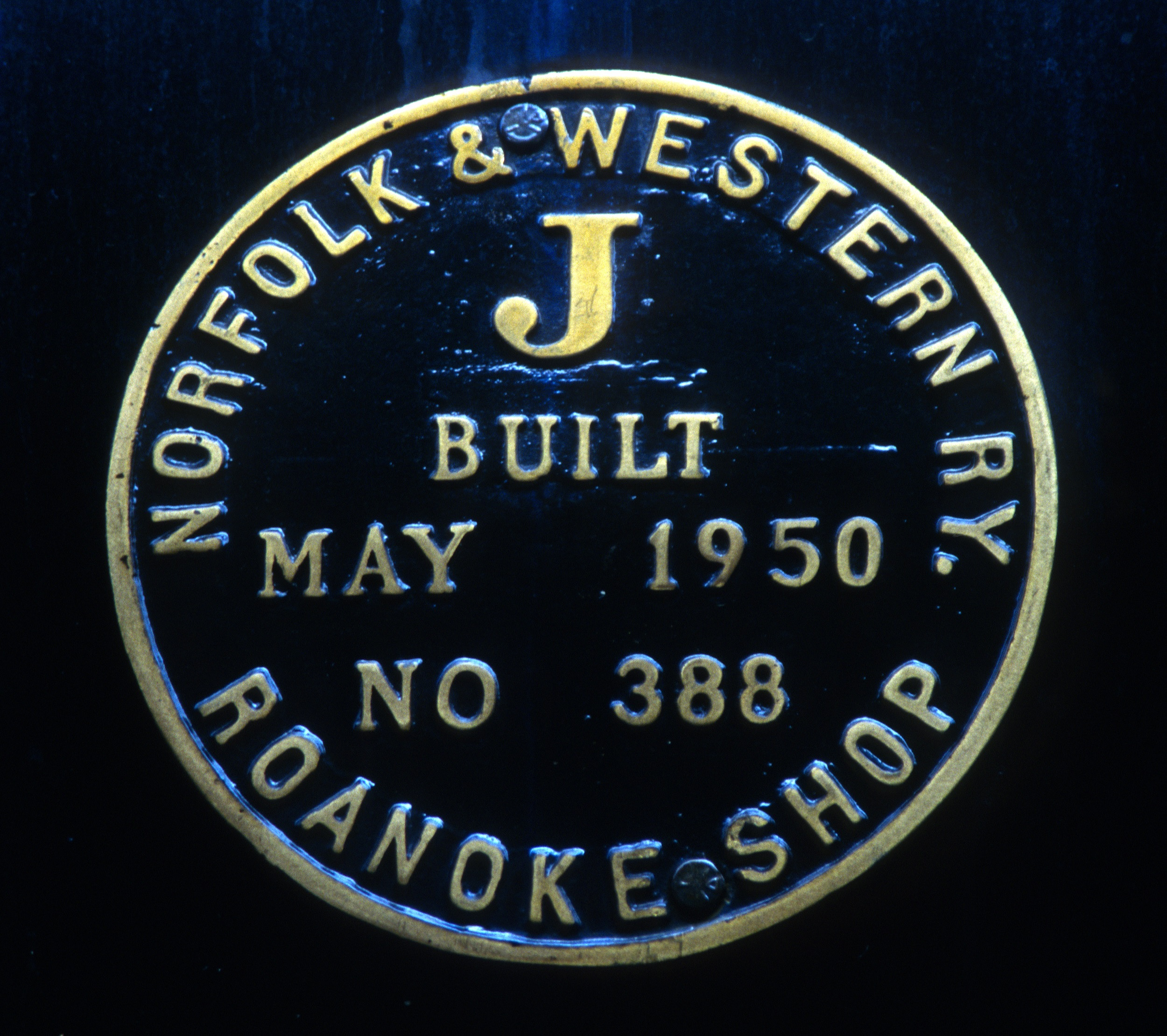
No. 611's builder's plate.

No. 611, the twelfth class J locomotive, was the first of the final batch of three. Completed at a cost of $251,544, it was put into revenue service on May 29, 1950. After some promotional photographs at Roanoke passenger station, No. 611 joined its fellow sister locomotives at work. They hauled N&W's Powhatan Arrow, Pocahontas, and Cavalier passenger trains, running 676.6 miles (1,088.9 km) between Norfolk, Virginia, and Cincinnati, Ohio; via Roanoke. They ferried the Southern Railway's (SOU) Birmingham Special, Pelican, and Tennessean, running 209.8 miles (337.6 km) between Monroe and Bristol, Virginia. They also hauled mail trains and secondary local passenger trains. On June 29, No. 611 went to the Shaffers Crossing engine terminal in Roanoke for its first monthly maintenance and an inspection of its right-side cylinder head.

On September 24, 1952, No. 611 double-headed behind No. 613 with the Eisenhower Special presidential campaign train from Columbus, Ohio, to Kenova, West Virginia, with brief whistle stops in Ohio at Chillicothe, Portsmouth, and Ironton. (Note: At Kenova, a Baltimore and Ohio (B&O) locomotive would take the train onward to Baltimore, Maryland. On September 25, the train arrived at Washington, D.C., then traverse over to Charlotte, North Carolina, via SOU. The next day, the train arrived at Winston-Salem, North Carolina, returning to N&W rails, where class J Nos. 600 and 604 would bring the train up to Roanoke for Nos. 612 and 613 to pull it to Petersburg, Virginia.) Aboard was Dwight D. Eisenhower, the former U.S. General of the Army who would win election as president of the United States seven weeks later.

In November 1955, after No. 611 had run a total of 30,628 miles (49,291 km), it was given a scheduled repair at the Roanoke Shops. Each time No. 611 received major repair work, the Roanoke Shops crew replaced some missing or worn parts with similar parts from out-of-service N&W locomotives, particularly class Js—but not from Nos. 600 and 613. No. 611 eventually held most of No. 605's running gear parts as evidence by the number stamped on. It also contain parts from various N&W class A 2-6-6-4 locomotives.

On January 23, 1956, the locomotive derailed near Cedar, West Virginia, with the late westbound Pocahontas. The engineer was killed and 60 passengers and crew were injured. Most railroads scrapped steam locomotives involved in such accidents, but N&W president Robert H. Smith ordered No. 611 to be extensively repaired and returned to service the following month. The accident was the country's last major steam-powered revenue passenger train wreck. (Note: The Norfolk & Western Steam in the 1950s: Volume 1 DVD includes the only known footage of No. 611's 1956 wreck.)

Around February and early March 1958, the class Js' tenders were outfitted with a cupola for the head-end brakeman to sit in, along with pipes to connect auxiliary water tenders and thereby eliminate stops to replenish water. On March 31, Smith retired and Stuart T. Saunders succeeded him a day later. Unlike his predecessor, Saunders had no interest in running steam locomotive operations and began to dieselize the N&W by ordering 268 new GP9 locomotives from the Electro-Motive Diesel (EMD) company. However, he had not yet received the passenger GP9s needed to take over the class J locomotives' passenger duties and instead leased some EMD E-units from the Atlantic Coast Line (ACL) and Richmond, Fredericksburg and Potomac (RF&P) railroads during July of that year. The class Js were reassigned to local freight service on the Norfolk Division, running between Norfolk and Crewe, Virginia, along with occasional trips to Lynchburg, Virginia. They also hauled timed freight trains on the Scioto Division, between Williamson, West Virginia, and Columbus, Ohio. Also around that time, the tandem rods between the second and third drivers of Nos. 600, 605, 610 and 611, were replaced with single coupling rods to reduce maintenance and the stress of longer crankpins on the fourth driver.

=== First retirement ===
"I am writing this again to urge that you give really serious consideration to keeping one operational class J steam locomotive on your roster permanently."

— W. Graham Claytor Jr. urging Stuart T. Saunders to preserve a single J class locomotive

The class J locomotives began to retire on October 24, 1958, when the N&W sent No. 604 to the scrap yard. Less than two months later, the ACL recalled its E-units to handle heavy passenger traffic in Florida, which led the N&W to return some of the class Js, including No. 611, to mail and passenger service for the rush Christmas season. Even after the arrival of N&W's new passenger motive power, the EMD GP9s, some of the class Js continued to haul local freight trains on the Norfolk Division until their boiler flue time certificate expired around 1959. Ultimately, the class Js ran about 30,450,000 miles (49,000,000 km) in revenue service.

In late December 1958, No. 611 was taken out of revenue service and stored in front of the deadline of its sister locomotives (Nos. 606, 608, and 609) at Bluefield, West Virginia, waiting to be sent to the scrap yard. But W. Graham Claytor Jr.—a Roanoke native turned Washington, D.C., lawyer—began trying to convince Saunders to keep one of the class J locomotives in working order; N&W chose No. 611 because it was in good condition with a rebuilt boiler, thanks to the extensive overhaul that followed its 1956 wreck. As vice chairman of the Roanoke Chapter of the National Railway Historical Society (NRHS), Claytor requested that No. 611 be moved under its own power back to Roanoke. This was done on May 22, 1959, and it was stored at the Shaffers Crossing roundhouse to await its opportunity to pull an excursion train. (Note: No. 611 was slated to pull a Farewell To Steam excursion from Roanoke to Hagerstown, Maryland, in the Shenandoah Division on July 11. But this was cancelled because the locomotive lacked the automatic train control (ATC) and cab signaling system required by Interstate Commerce Commission (ICC) regulations to run on the Shenandoah Division.) On August 21, Nos. 610 and 612 were the last Js to be retired for scrap, leaving No. 611 the only one of its class.

On August 30, Claytor Jr.'s father—Appalachian Power Company (APCO) vice president W. Graham Claytor—borrowed No. 611 to haul a special excursion train for APCO employees and their families from Roanoke to Norfolk; some passengers traveled on to Virginia Beach, Virginia, before returning to Roanoke on September 2. On October 18, No. 611 traveled to Petersburg, Virginia, where it hitched up to an excursion train organized by Washington, D.C.'s NRHS chapter from Washington Union Station to Norfolk. (Note: It puffed out a plume of black smoke, which was uncommon for the class J locomotives.)

On October 24, No. 611 pulled the Rail Museum Safari excursion from Roanoke to Williamson and back with stops at Bluefield and Iaeger, West Virginia. It pulled 12 cars, including two open-air gondolas at the rear of its consist with 450 railway enthusiasts from 25 U.S. states onboard. This is also the N&W's final steam-powered revenue passenger train. Upon returning to Roanoke, the locomotive went to the Shaffers Crossing roundhouse, where it was officially retired from N&W's operating locomotive roster on October 27 and stored alongside M class 4-8-0 No. 475. On November 3, because of Claytor's letter writing campaign, Saunders announced that No. 611, which still had some serviceable flues in its boiler, would not be scrapped, but used as a standby stationary boiler at the Roanoke Shops.

In May 1960, the N&W ceased to operate steam locomotives in revenue service, becoming one of the last major Class I railroads to do so. In April 1961, an unknown buyer offered to purchase No. 611 for $5,000 ($41,200 today); the N&W replied that it was not for sale. A year later, the locomotive's boiler flue time certificate expired and it returned to storage at the Shaffers Crossing roundhouse. In late May of that year, Saunders abruptly donated No. 611 to the Roanoke City Council; Claytor donated $500 for its upkeep. In spring 1963, No. 611 was cosmetically restored and put on static display at the new Roanoke Transportation Museum in Wasena Park, which opened on Memorial Day that year. In late 1966, at Claytor's request, SOU president D. W. Brosnan launched the railroad's steam excursion program with Ms class 2-8-2 No. 4501 running excursion trips, including additional N&W trackage.

=== First mainline excursion service ===
==== 1980s ====
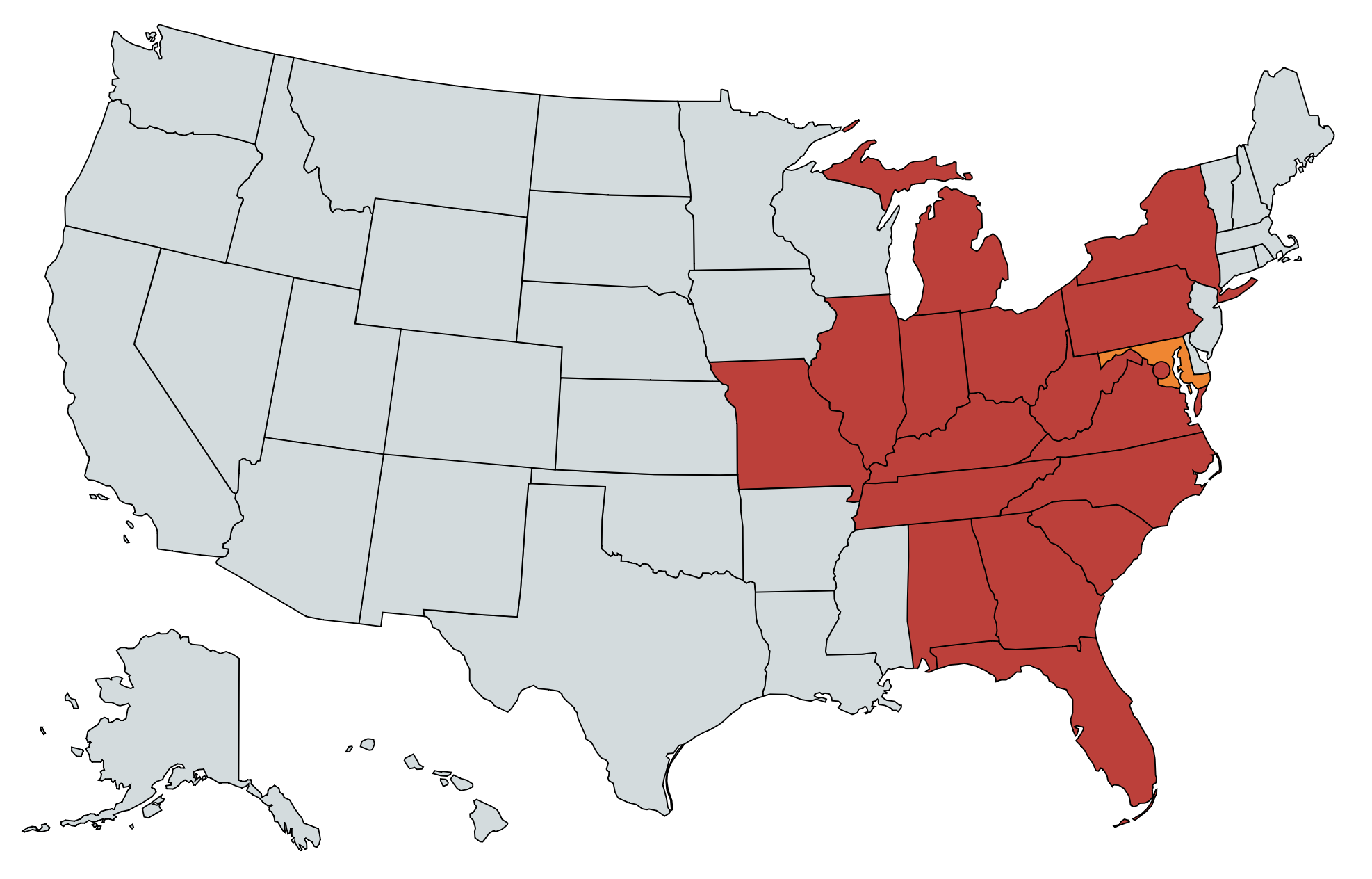
The U.S. states visited by No. 611 in excursion service. (Note: No. 611 was towed in Maryland)

During the 1970s, the Roanoke Chapter of the NRHS forged a potential plan to return No. 611 to operation. (Note: On May 1, 1971, No. 611's whistle was used on Nickel Plate Road (NKP) No. 759, which pulled the final run of the N&W's Pocahontas passenger train from Roanoke to Norfolk.) With the support of Graham Claytor Jr. and his brother Robert, a senior N&W executive, the Chapter officials arranged a meeting with N&W president John Fishwick to seek approval to perform a hydrostatic test on the locomotive. Fishwick agreed, but he refused to let No. 611 run on N&W trackage. Two weeks after Fishwick retired on September 30, 1981, his successor—Robert Claytor—leased the locomotive from the Roanoke City Council for $5,000 per year. He made plans to restore No. 611 as a gift for the city of Roanoke's centennial anniversary. On October 16, the locomotive was removed from display on temporarily laid panel tracks and moved to the Roanoke Shops, where it was inspected and prepared for its trip to the restoration site. It was discovered that No. 611's bearings were already greased up, thanks to some N&W crew workers who had secretly entered the Roanoke Transportation Museum during its closing days in January 1981. On October 22, the locomotive left Roanoke; three days later, it arrived at SOU's Norris Yard Steam Shop in Irondale, Alabama. Additionally, No. 611 was coupled to two hopper cars at both ends to give it extra braking power.

The restoration work, performed by SOU master mechanic Bill Purdie and his team, began with supervision from retired Roanoke Shops foreman Paul Housman and ex-N&W draftsmen Mark W. Faville, who provided copies of the original N&W class J design drawings. No. 611's injectors, dynamo, and other mechanical appliances were rebuilt. The firebox sheets, and flues were replaced. It was discovered that the water in the locomotive's feedwater heater was frozen and it causes the feedwater pump to crack, so the latter had to be replaced with a new one taken from class A No. 1218. (Note: No. 1218 presently received a replacement pump from one of the B&O Railroad Museum's steam locomotives.) Some new parts were fabricated, including the crosshead guides and boiler staybolts. Two of the locomotive's left-side rod bearings were refurbished by Timken. The locomotive's original Westinghouse 8-ET type brake system was replaced with a new 26-L type brake stand to accommodate easier repairs and replacement parts. The cab interior was sheathed with varnished hardwood. A radio speaker system was added inside the cab to enable the locomotive crew to communicate with the train dispatcher. The locomotive's original Sunbeam single-beam headlight was replaced with a vertical Pyle-National dual-beam headlight for the crew having better visibility at night. The restoration work, which cost around $600,000, would be Purdie's last contribution before he retired at the end of 1982.

"I'm going to introduce to you... an old citizen of Roanoke. Roanoke born, Roanoke bred, and Roanoke proud! Ladies and gentlemen: I give N&W's class J No. 611!"

— Robert B. Claytor reintroducing No. 611 to the public in Roanoke, on August 22, 1982

On July 5, 1982, No. 611 was steamed up in a stationary test fire. It was then reassembled, repainted, and on August 14, it moved under its own power for the first time in nearly 23 years. It took over excursion service from Southern No. 2716, which was retired due to firebox problems. (Note: In excursion service, No. 611 required an auxiliary water tender for longer trips and a tool car to carry maintenance equipment for the locomotive. The auxiliary tender No. 220166 was originally from an ex-Louisville & Nashville (L&N) 2-8-4 Big Emma M-1 No. 1958. Additionally, the tool car No. 1407 was a former N&W storage mail car.) During that time, the N&W and SOU railroads merged to form the Norfolk Southern Railway (NS), which retained the steam excursion program and doubled the trackage available for No. 611 to run on. Robert Claytor served as the first chairman and chief executive officer of NS. After a test run from Irondale to Chattanooga, Tennessee, on August 15 and returned to Irondale with a 38-car freight train the next day, No. 611 departed for Roanoke on August 20 with Claytor as the engineer and his son Preston as the fireman. After some whistle stops in Anniston, Alabama; Atlanta, Georgia; and Salisbury, North Carolina, the locomotive arrived in Roanoke on August 22 for the city's centennial anniversary. In a public speech, Claytor called No. 611 "Roanoke born, Roanoke bred, and Roanoke proud", introducing the locomotive as an icon of the city's railroading history.

On Labor Day weekend in 1982, No. 611 began its inaugural excursion run, pulling the NRHS Roanoke Chapter's Centennial Limited train from Roanoke to Norfolk. The locomotive was to be turned on the Lambert's Point Yard turntable for the return trip, but it derailed on the sharply curved approach track, which had been modified after the N&W steam era. A pair of GE C30-7 diesel locomotives were called in to haul the return trip, while No. 611 was rerailed and towed to Roanoke to be repaired. On September 6, Graham Claytor ran No. 611 on a one-way excursion trip from Roanoke to Alexandria, Virginia. On October 19, No. 611 went to Bluefield and Iaeger, where it was tested to be turned on the wyes in preparation for the round-trip excursions from Roanoke to Bluefield and Iaeger on October 23, 24, and 30. On Thanksgiving weekend, No. 611 hauled its last 1982 excursion, which was called the Oyster Bowl Special and ran from Roanoke to Norfolk and back. During that time, ex-N&W road foreman Frank W. Collins served as No. 611's regular engineer.

1983 saw No. 611's first full excursion season for the NS steam program. It began with the centennial Pocahontas Coalfields excursion, a round trip from Bluefield to Norfolk on March 16-17. On April 30, the locomotive pulled a Peach Blossom Special excursion out of Roanoke to Salisbury and arrived in Atlanta the next day. On July 17, it double-headed with Savannah and Atlanta 750 to pull an Old Dominion Chapter NRHS excursion on RF&P trackage from Alexandria to Richmond, Virginia. During its time in Richmond, No. 611 pulled round-trip excursions: to Balcony Falls, Virginia, on the 21st, and to Norfolk on the 24th. On July 25, the locomotive left Richmond hauling the longest one-way NRHS Independence Limited excursion trip, with nighttime stops at Bluefield, West Virginia, on that day; Portsmouth, Ohio on the 26th; and Fort Wayne, Indiana, on the 27th; before arriving in Chicago, Illinois, on the 28th. Before that, on the night of the 26th after arriving at Portsmouth, No. 611 developed cracks in its firebox and a number of broken staybolts. The crew dropped the fire, while crew member Charlie Schlotthober welded the firebox's cracks and the broken staybolts. On July 31 to August 28, No. 611 ran excursion trips out of Chicago and St. Louis, Missouri, on Chicago and North Western (C&NW) tracks and ex-Nickel Plate Road (NKP) and Wabash (WAB) rails that N&W acquired in 1964. After the 1983 excursion season ended, the cracks in the locomotive's firebox worsen and No. 611 headed back to the Norris Yard Steam Shop to have it fully repaired and the staybolts replaced.

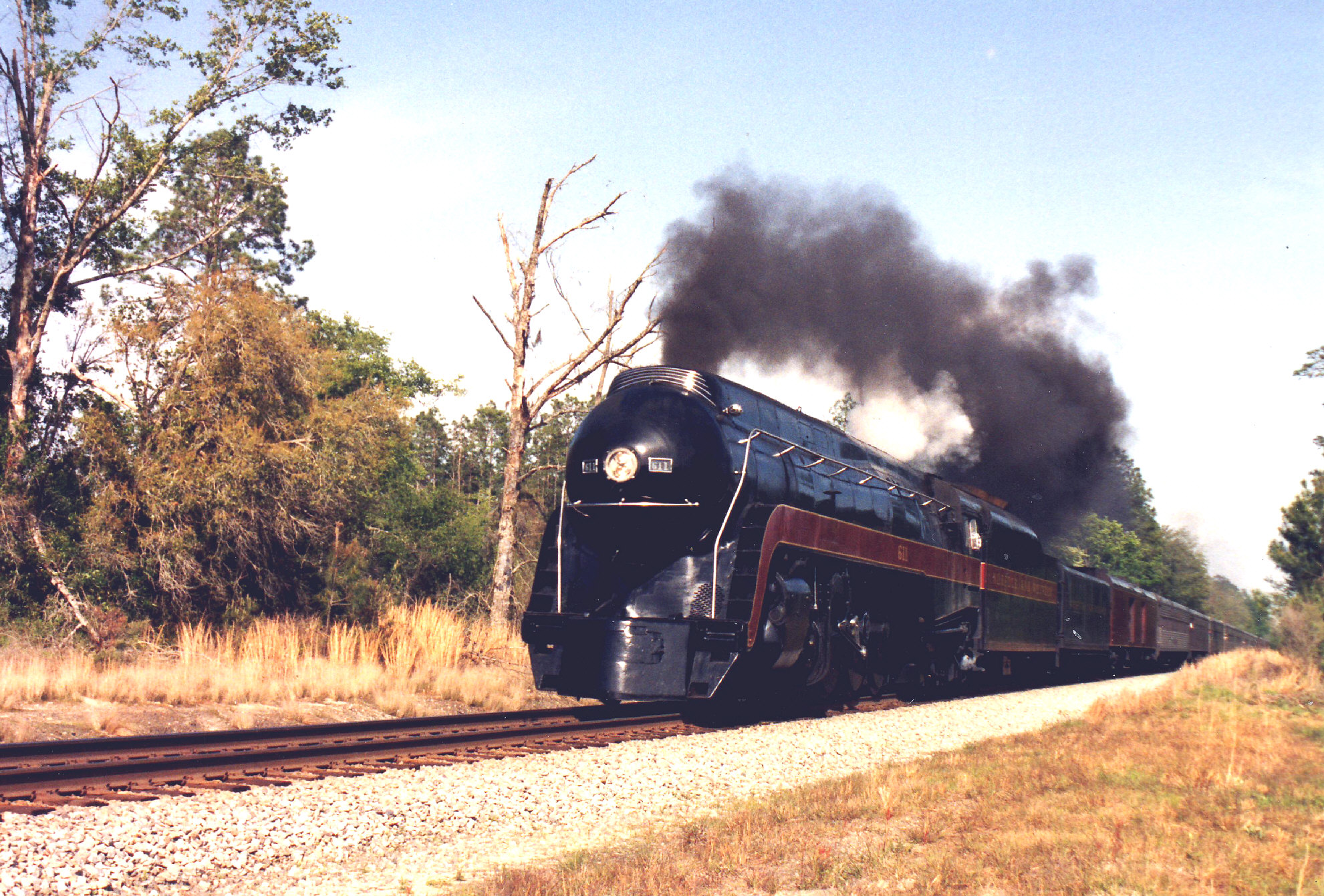
No. 611 approaches Valdosta, Georgia, with the Suwanee Steam Special excursion in April 1992.

The locomotive resumed excursion service on April 29, 1984, with a round-trip excursion from Atlanta to Macon, Georgia. Another round-trip, to Chattanooga, followed the next day. On May 19, the American Society of Mechanical Engineers (ASME) named No. 611 a National Historic Mechanical Engineering Landmark and presented a plaque to the Roanoke Transportation Museum. On August 11 and 12, the locomotive pulled more excursions on ex-NKP rails, including between Erie, Pennsylvania, and Buffalo, New York, for the Lake Shore Railway Historical Society. On August 19 and 20, it double-headed with Nickel Plate Road 765 from Erie to Ludlow, Kentucky. On November 10 and 11, No. 611 visited Jacksonville, Florida, to haul the Suwanee Steam Special round-trip excursion between there and Valdosta, Georgia on the former Atlantic, Valdosta and Western line, for the North Florida Chapter NRHS. (Note: No. 611 hauled this excursion trip numerous times between 1985 and 1994, excluding 1987 and 1993.)

In June 1985, No. 611 ran another long one-way NRHS Independence Limited excursion trip from Roanoke to Kansas City, Missouri. Two months later, the locomotive hauled a special Ohio State Fair excursion from Kenova to Columbus; in the cab was Walter T. Carter, a long-retired N&W engineer who had run one of the class J locomotives on the Powhatan Arrow 28 years earlier. (Note: Carter would later die in 1988.)

In early 1986, the locomotive was given a thorough overhaul that included repairs to its running gear and receiving a new ashpan. (Note: During the planning stages of the 1986 World Exposition, No. 611 was invited to travel to the Steam Expo event in Vancouver, British Columbia, where multiple other steam locomotives were planned to participate, including Southern Pacific 4449 and Union Pacific 844. NS declined to send No. 611, since a long-distance journey to Vancouver was deemed too costly, and NS preferred to invest in restoring No. 1218. The railroad was instead represented in the event by a replica of Best Friend of Charleston.) On that same year of May 18, No. 611 was pulling an NS employee excursion train from Norfolk to Petersburg, Virginia, through the Great Dismal Swamp in Suffolk, Virginia, but the consist struck a faulty switch on the mainline, damaging 14 cars, and injuring 177 passengers. After the wreck, NS decided to limit its steam locomotives, including No. 611, to 40 mph (64 km/h) while pulling excursions on their rails. Despite the accident, NS continued the steam program per Bob Claytor's request. Additionally, this would mark the retirement of NS steam program general manager Jim Bistline, who appointed Carl Jensen to take his position. Jensen was also an ex-N&W employee and was one of the passengers that rode on No. 611's Rail Museum Safari excursion back in October 1959. Claytor also retired but remained on the NS Board of Directors. His position was taken over by Arnold B. McKinnon, who was not interested in the NS steam program, but did not try to end it as long as it was not costing the railroad too much money.

During the NRHS convention in August 1987, No. 611 pulled a round-trip 24-car excursion train from Roanoke to Radford, Virginia, where it ran side by side with the recently restored No. 1218, which was pulling an empty 50-hopper car train; the locomotives later double-headed back to Roanoke. After 1987, Collins retired; his assistant Bob Saxton would serve as No. 611's regular engineer until late 1994. (Note: Collins would die in 1990.) A maintenance period saw No. 611's flues replaced; it returned to service in September 1988. (Note: NS retired and donated No. 611's original auxiliary tender No. 221066 to the Indiana Transportation Museum, where it was used behind Nickel Plate Road 587. No. 611 was given another ex-L&N Big Emma auxiliary tender No. 250002.) In June 1989, No. 611 joined Nickel Plate Road 587 to haul the Roanoke NRHS Chapter Independence Limited excursion trip from Cleveland, Ohio, to Roanoke. In July, No. 611 participated in that year's NRHS convention held in Asheville, North Carolina. On the 16th, it joined Nos. 587 and 1218 on a triple-header pulling 15 empty passenger cars from Roanoke to Lynchburg. On the 18th, No. 611 hauled the 14-car Asheville Special excursion from Alexandria to Salisbury, with No. 1218 added in Lynchburg for a doubleheader. The locomotive did not join Nos. 1218 and 587 in Asheville and remained in Salisbury, due to concerns over its wheelbase accommodating the Old Fort Loops' curves at the time. On the 24th, No. 611 hauled the excursion from Lynchburg to Alexandria. On September 16, No. 611 ran two round-trip excursions from Roanoke to Radford and Lynchburg, Virginia, pulling a matching set of 10 Tuscan red passenger cars, commemorating the 40th anniversary of the Powhatan Arrow re-equipment.

==== 1990s ====
Throughout 1991, the Norris Yard maintainers replaced No. 611's crown sheet and tires and overhauled its trailing truck. (Note: The J was advertised to haul two excursions in August for that year's NRHS convention in Huntington, West Virginia, but its prolonged overhaul delayed its return to service, and No. 1218 filled in.) Upon its return to service on October 23, No. 611 joined No. 4501 and No. 1218 on a triple-header, hauling a 28-car passenger excursion train from Chattanooga to Ooltewah, Tennessee, on November 3, to celebrate the NS steam program's 25th anniversary. While No. 4501 took the first eight coaches to Cleveland, Tennessee, and then back to Chattanooga, the N&W steamers hauled the rest of the 20 cars to complete the one-way trip to Atlanta. After the 1991 season ended, No. 611's tender was fitted with coal boards to increase its capacity, which enabled the locomotive to run more than 300 miles (480 km) without stopping for coal. No. 1218 also went out of service for an extensive overhaul, leaving No. 611 to run the steam program alone.

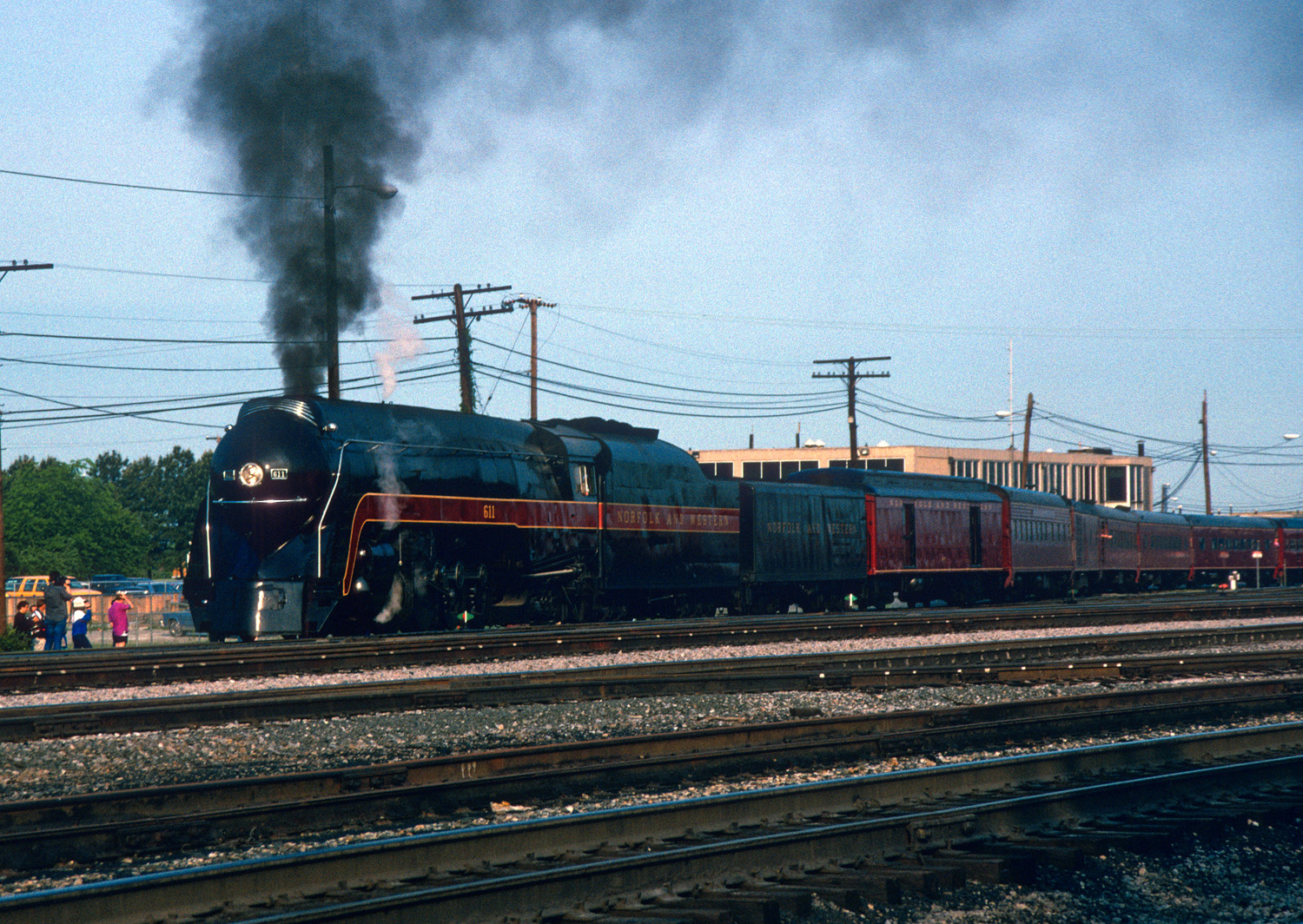
No. 611 pulling an excursion out of Norfolk, Virginia, in 1993.

On May 2, 1992, No. 611 ran its first excursion on the Bristol Line—from Radford to Bristol, Virginia, and back—sponsored by the Watauga Valley Chapter NRHS. In October 1992, No. 611 ran two round-trip excursions from Charlotte to Asheville, North Carolina. The first, on October 24, ran via the Old Fort Loops. The second, on the following day, brought 20 passenger cars over the Saluda Grade, the steepest standard-gauge mainline railway grade in the United States. It was the first time a steam locomotive had gone over the grade since No. 4501 in 1972. On the advice of NS Piedmont Division superintendent Eugene Greene, the consist was split at the bottom of Saluda Grade to prevent the couplers on the passenger cars from breaking on the steepest part. Three assisting EMD SD40-2 diesel locomotives pulled the first 15 cars. Pulling the last five, No. 611 saw its wheels slip and then stalled for a few minutes near downtown Saluda, then reached the top of the grade. The locomotives and cars were reassembled in the Saluda siding to continue to Asheville and return to Charlotte. That year, McKinnon retired; his successor as chairman and CEO of NS, David R. Goode, would continue the railroad's effort to make a profit by running freight trains, with annual evaluations of the steam program.

On May 30, 1993, No. 611 conquered Saluda Grade again when pulling an excursion from Asheville to Spartanburg, South Carolina, and back. In July that year, it then pulled the NRHS Roanoke Chapter's 19th annual Independence Limited excursion, which arrived from Knoxville, Tennessee, by SOU No. 4501 at Richlands, Virginia, bound for Fort Wayne, Indiana. Upon arrival in Fort Wayne, the excursion was transferred to NKP Nos. 587 and 765, which took the train to Chicago for that year's NRHS convention. Sometime after 1993, No. 611 was added to the National Park Service's Historic American Engineering Record. With No. 1218 still being overhauled, No. 611 have handled the steam program alone with no problems.

On June 21, 1994, at Birmingham, No. 611 joined ex-Frisco (SLSF) 4-8-2 No. 1522, which had come all the way from St. Louis with the Peach Blossom Special excursion via Burlington Northern (BN) trackage for the trip to Atlanta, where the Atlanta Chapter NRHS convention's Steam'n Thru Georgia event occurred. On June 23, No. 1522 pulled the convention's Nancy Hanks Special excursion on former Central of Georgia (CG) rails from Atlanta to Macon, where No. 611 joined in for the return trip with the excursion renamed the Ponce de Leon Route Special since the train is switching onto ex-SOU rails, which is where the Ponce de Leon passenger train used to run. On June 25, No. 611—helped by two NS diesels, Nos. 4610 and 7140—hauled the convention's Airline Belle Route Special excursion from Atlanta to Lula, Georgia. The diesels pulled the excursion onward to the former Northeastern Railroad branch line leading to Athens, Georgia, because No. 611 was too heavy, then returned the excursion to Lula; No. 611 pulled it back to Atlanta. The next day, Nos. 611 and 1522 worked with the diesels to pull the Royal Palm Route Special excursion from Atlanta to Chattanooga. At Rome, Georgia, the excursion consist was split: the two steam locomotives pulled 11 one-way excursion cars to Chattanooga, while two diesels pulled 11 round-trip excursion cars back to Atlanta. (Note: Originally, No. 4501 was going to pull both the Atlanta-Lula-Athens and Atlanta-Rome excursions, but was sidelined by maintenance woes at TVRM.) After the Atlanta NRHS event, No. 611 returned to the Midwest to haul excursions out of Illinois, Indiana, Michigan, and Ohio from July to September.

=== Second retirement ===
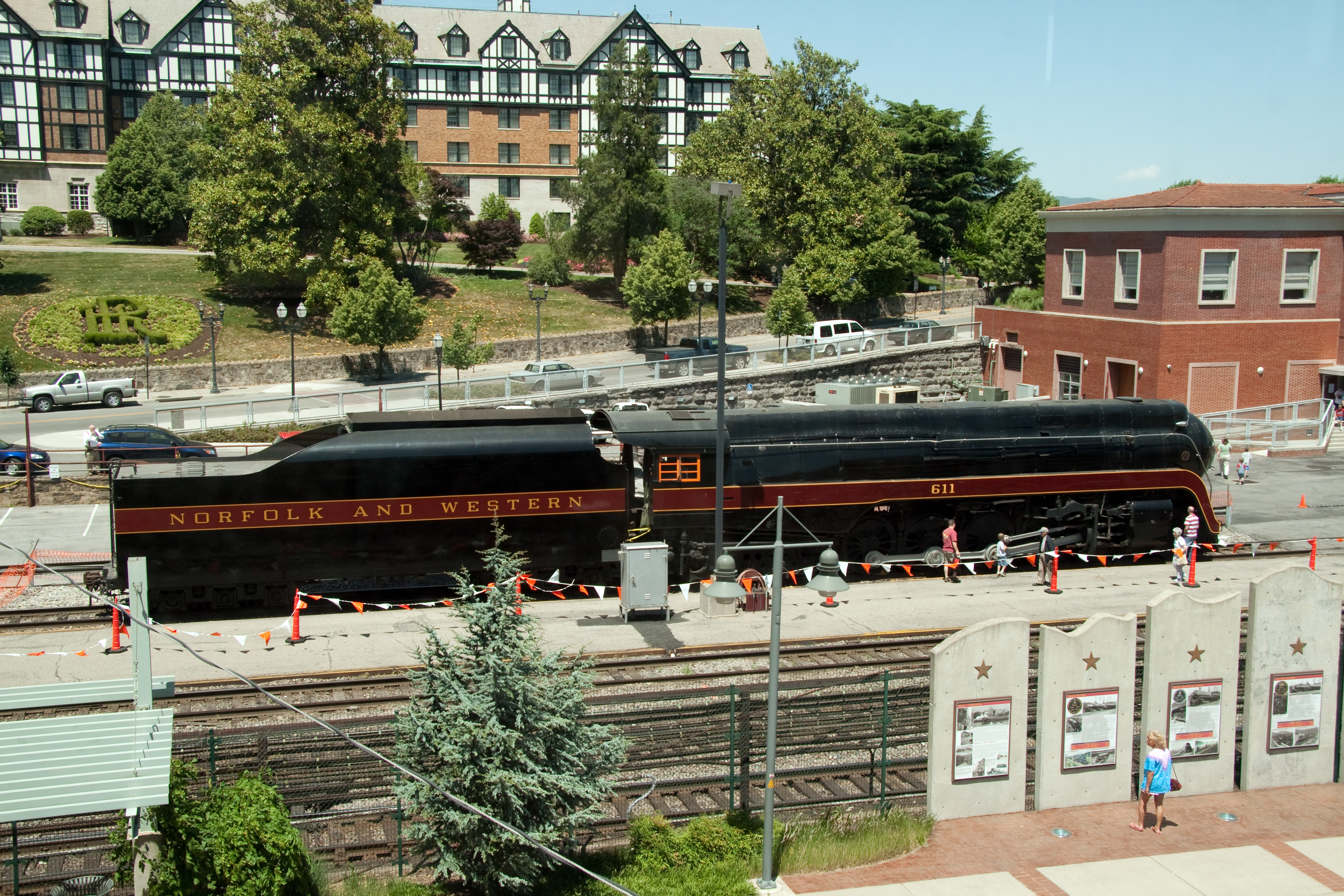
No. 611 on display in front of the Hotel Roanoke and O. Winston Link Museum buildings during National Train Day in 2010.

On September 28, 1994, a consist of 16 cars was parked at the Kinney Yard in Lynchburg for a planned NRHS excursion to Richmond, which was to have been led by No. 611 in early October. At 12:10 a.m., an NS piggyback freight train was switched to the wrong track, derailing two freight cars and nine passenger cars. Two of the passenger cars were undamaged, while the other two were deemed unrepairable. The other five damaged cars were rerailed and towed by No. 611 to the East End Shops in Roanoke for repairs. The accident led NS to raise its liability insurance from $10 million to $25 million. The two damaged cars were released from repairs, but the other three were still being repaired. Because of that, NS needed more passenger cars to complete No. 611's planned excursions by leasing four passenger cars from the North Carolina Department of Transportation's (NCDOT) Piedmont Service train. They also leased two coaches from the Atlanta Railcar Company and one from the Watauga Valley Chapter NRHS. On October 29, the same day that No. 611 pulled a round-trip excursion between Bristol and Roanoke, Goode announced that the railroad would end the steam program due to rising insurance, maintenance costs, low spare system capacity, and delayed freight traffic. (Note: In 2015, Goode said that this was a mistake.)

On November 12, No. 611 pulled a Greenville Chapter NRHS round-trip excursion from Greenville, South Carolina to Toccoa, Georgia. The next day, it pulled another one to Asheville, via Saluda Grade. On December 3, No. 611 hauled the last NS steam-powered excursion trip from Birmingham, Alabama, to Chattanooga, where the locomotive was photographed with the Tennessee Valley Railroad Museum's (TVRM) ex-U.S. Army 2-8-0 No. 610 in the sidings adjacent to the Chattanooga Choo-Choo Hotel. Afterwards, it returned to Birmingham with the excursion. It set out for Roanoke, making brief stops in Atlanta on December 5 and Salisbury the following day. (Note: On the final leg of the journey, a local church chimed as No. 611 whistled through Gretna, Virginia, just 25 miles (40 km) south of Lynchburg, reminding some of O. Winston Link's famous recording of N&W No. 603 arriving at Rural Retreat, Virginia with the northbound Pelican passenger train on the night of December 27, 1957.) After No. 611 arrived in Roanoke on December 7, it entered the Shaffers Crossing engine terminal, where its fire was extinguished for the final time in the 20th century after 12 years of excursion service with NS. (Note: On December 10 and 11, 1994, NS hosted their final public excursion train with diesel locomotives pulling it between Asheville and Chattanooga.) The locomotive's boiler flue time certificate expired in early 1995. (Note: Preston Claytor removed No. 611's whistle for safekeeping.) It was then sent to storage at the East End Shops.

On October 7, 1995, No. 611 was returned to the Roanoke City Council, which put it back on display at the city's transportation museum. The Roanoke Transportation Museum's original location at Wasena Park had been destroyed in the 1985 Election Day floods caused by Hurricane Juan, and the museum reopened the following year as the Virginia Museum of Transportation Museum (VMT) in the former N&W Roanoke freight station. No. 611 was installed under the Robert B. Claytor and W. Graham Claytor Jr. Pavilion, whose namesakes had died in 1993 and 1994, respectively. (Note: The locomotive's second original auxiliary tender, No. 250002, was donated to the Friends of the 261 for use behind Milwaukee Road 261. The No. 1407 tool car was purchased by the Roanoke Chapter NRHS, but would eventually be donated to the VMT in 2025.)

In June 2003, No. 611 was reunited with No. 1218, which was partially reassembled and cosmetically restored from its cancelled 1992-96 overhaul. In 2007, Nos. 611 and 1218 were put on temporary display at the Roanoke Shops to commemorate its 125th anniversary. (Note: At that time, No. 611's whistle was on loan to the Steam Railroading Institute in Owosso, Michigan, which installed it on Pere Marquette No. 1225.) On May 8, 2010, No. 611 was put on temporary display in front of the former Roanoke passenger station, now known as the O. Winston Link Museum, for National Train Day. In 2011, the Roanoke City Council nicknamed No. 611 The Spirit of Roanoke in which the VMT inscribed underneath both sides of the cab windows. On April 2, 2012, the Roanoke City Council donated their ownership of Nos. 611 and 1218 to the VMT.

=== Second mainline excursion service ===
In 2011, NS CEO Wick Moorman brought back the steam program under the name 21st Century Steam, leading to speculation that No. 611, nicknamed the Queen of Steam, might again be restored to operating condition. On February 22, 2013, VMT executive director Bev Fitzpatrick and the officials formed the Fire Up 611! committee to study the feasibility of returning the locomotive to active service. Three of its members had worked with No. 611 since the 1980s and 1990s: chairman Preston Claytor, volunteer firewoman Cheri George, and Steam Operations Corporation president Scott Lindsay. On June 2, the VMT and NS tested No. 611's bearings and found that the locomotive was in excellent condition to be restored. On June 28, VMT officials launched the Fire Up 611! capital campaign. The group aimed to raise $3.5 million by the end of October to acquire a maintenance facility for the restoration. After they fell $1 million short, NS donated $1.5 million to the committee, drawing on the proceeds from the auction of a Mark Rothko painting.

In March 2014, after raising money from nearly 3,000 donors in 18 countries, the Fire Up 611! committee struck a deal with the North Carolina Transportation Museum (NCTM) in Spencer, North Carolina, to use the ex-SOU Bob Julian roundhouse to restore No. 611. The committee also made several key appointments to the locomotive's mechanical team, including three people who had previously worked with No. 611: ex-SOU general foreman of steam Douglas S. Karhan, ex-NS steam department foreman Robert Yuill, and then NS senior general foreman Bob Saxton.

On May 24, No. 611 was towed out of the VMT; it was moved to the NCTM the next day. (Note: It was moved to Spencer, North Carolina, by NS No. 8103, an SD70ACe heritage unit diesel locomotive painted in Norfolk and Western colors.) Moorman removed the first bolt from No. 611 at the Streamliners at Spencer event the following weekend, ceremonially beginning the restoration work. On June 2, the actual work was begun by the Steam Operations Corporation with the help of 75 volunteers, including several from the Age of Steam Roundhouse in Sugarcreek, Ohio. By July 1, the locomotive had been stripped down. The restoration work included installing new flues and rear flue sheet; boiler work; and repairs to the locomotive's trucks, tender, superheaters, boiler staybolts, cross-compound air pumps, safety valves, running gear, and air brakes. It met the Federal Railroad Administration's (FRA) safety guidelines and certification requirements. On July 25, the Fire Up 611! committee and the NCTM offered behind-the-scenes tours of No. 611's restoration progress.

On February 23, 2015, No. 611's boiler passed a hydrostatic test; it was test-fired on March 31. Around April, the VMT filed with the United States Patent and Trademark Office (USPTO) to secure trademark rights related to No. 611 for the products, services, and media. The locomotive was also reassembled and repainted with paint donated from Axalta. On May 9, No. 611 moved under its own power for the first time in nearly 21 years. On May 15, Claytor resigned his position to protest the VMT board's decision to engrave No. 611 with the words The Spirit of Roanoke; he was replaced by executive search consultant Jim Stump. On May 21, the locomotive completed a round-trip mainline test run between Spencer and Greensboro, North Carolina. But upon returning to Spencer, the wye at nearby Salisbury was too tight for the train to be turned around, as the locomotive's cab came in contact with its tender. The crew returned the train to the NCTM running backward. (Note: In preparation for its second excursion career, No. 611 received another ex-L&N Big Emma auxiliary tender VMTX No. 250001.)

On May 23, during the Send Off Celebration event, 10 guests paid $611 each to drive the locomotive. On May 28, the NCTM and Trains magazine held the Fired Up! photo charter runbys with the locomotive pulling replicated 1950s freight and passenger train consists, alongside ACL E6 No. 501, which was temporarily re-lettered "NORFOLK AND WESTERN" to replicate one of the leased ACL diesel locomotives that N&W used to replace No. 611 and its fellow class J locomotives on their passenger trains. On May 30, No. 611 began its homecoming trip back to Roanoke, pulling 17 excursion cars loaded with 200 contributors, supporters, and volunteers, including Moorman on the NS theater car Buena Vista, which was at the rear of the excursion. The next day, the locomotive was reunited with the inoperable No. 1218 and class Y6a No. 2156, which was on loan from the National Museum of Transportation in St. Louis for display at the VMT until 2020.

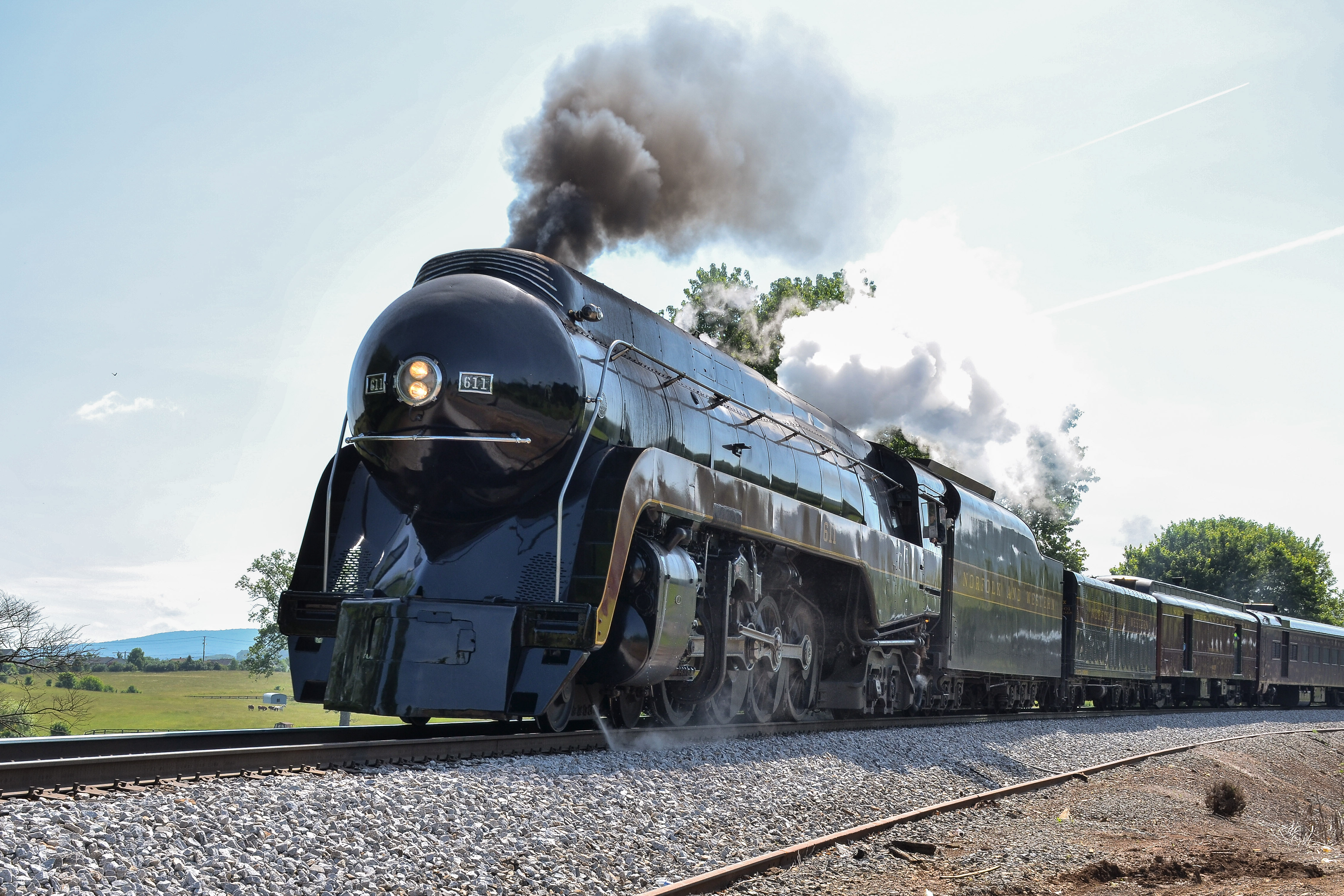
No. 611 pulling The American excursion on June 7, 2015.

On June 6 and 7, 2015, No. 611 hauled its first 21st Century Steam public excursion in Virginia, running The American between Manassas and Front Royal on NS' B-Line. The locomotive then returned to ex-N&W rails, hauling the Cavalier round-trip excursion between Lynchburg and Petersburg on June 13 and 14. On June 15, it hauled a short freight train bound for Spencer, where it began its monthly boiler inspection at the NCTM. On July 1, No. 611 pulled a short revenue freight train back to Roanoke, where it ran two sold-out round-trip excursions: the Powhatan Arrow to Lynchburg through the Blue Ridge grade in the morning and the Pelican to Radford over the Christiansburg grade in the afternoon during the Independence Day weekend. The locomotive sometimes slipped on the grades due to rain. Coupled behind the auxiliary tender in its consist was NS research car No. 32, used to test the locomotive's power. This was the first time a mainline steam locomotive had been tested in action since 1977, when SOU tested Texas and Pacific No. 610. Then NS ended its 21st Century Steam program, although No. 611 continued to pull various excursion trips over NS trackage.

In February 2016, No. 611 received new front leading wheels and axles made by Brenco Product Engineering. In April, the locomotive ran two NCTM-sponsored round-trip excursions: The Virginian from Spencer to Lynchburg on April 9 and the sold-out Blue Ridge Special from Spencer to Asheville the next day, where it ran via the Old Fort Loops for the first time since 1994. This would also be the first time No. 611 ran excursions, sponsored by the NCTM, since May 7 and 8, 1994. On April 11, No. 611 partook in another NCTM photo charter runby, this one with ex-Lehigh Valley Coal Company 0-6-0ST No. 126. On April 23 and 24, the locomotive ran The Roanoker round-trip excursion from Greensboro to Roanoke via Altavista, Virginia, on ex-Virginian Railway (VGN) mainline. From mid-May to early June, it reran the previous year's Powhatan Arrow, Pelican, and American round-trip excursions. Afterwards, it returned to the NCTM for the summer events of cab rides, caboose rides, in-cab experiences, visitors sounding the locomotive's whistle, and short passenger train rides around the museum. On August 8, No. 611 returned to Roanoke under its own power for display at the VMT. On Labor Day weekend, it was steamed up again for the VMT events of cab tours and photo sessions with N&W GP9 No. 521. On September 7, No. 611 returned to the NCTM again for more events of cab rides, caboose rides, and in-cab experiences before returning to Roanoke on October 24.

On January 6, 2017, the locomotive returned to the NCTM for its annual FRA inspection. On April 8, it ran The Virginian round-trip excursion and the next day's Charlotte Special round-trip excursion from Spencer to Charlotte in the morning and a second round-trip excursion, the Piedmont Limited from Spencer to Greensboro in the afternoon for the NCTM. On April 20, No. 611 went back to Greensboro to pull The Roanoker round-trip excursion between there and Roanoke on April 22 and 23. Afterwards, on April 28-30, No. 611 took part in NCTM's 100 Years of American Steam event in Spencer, which marked the unveiling of the restored 4-4-0 Texas steam locomotive. After the event, No. 611 reran the Cavalier round-trip excursion between Lynchburg and Petersburg on May 6 and 7. On May 23, the Virginia General Assembly officially named No. 611 as the state's official steam locomotive. On Memorial Day weekend, No. 611 ran its final mainline round-trip excursions out of Roanoke; the Powhatan Arrow to Lynchburg and the Pocahontas to Radford. The locomotive's excursion economic impact was estimated by a regional tourism bureau to be at least $4 million per year. (Note: These were the last contributions of VMT executive director Bev Fitzpatrick before he retired at the end of 2017.)

=== Post-NS excursion service ===
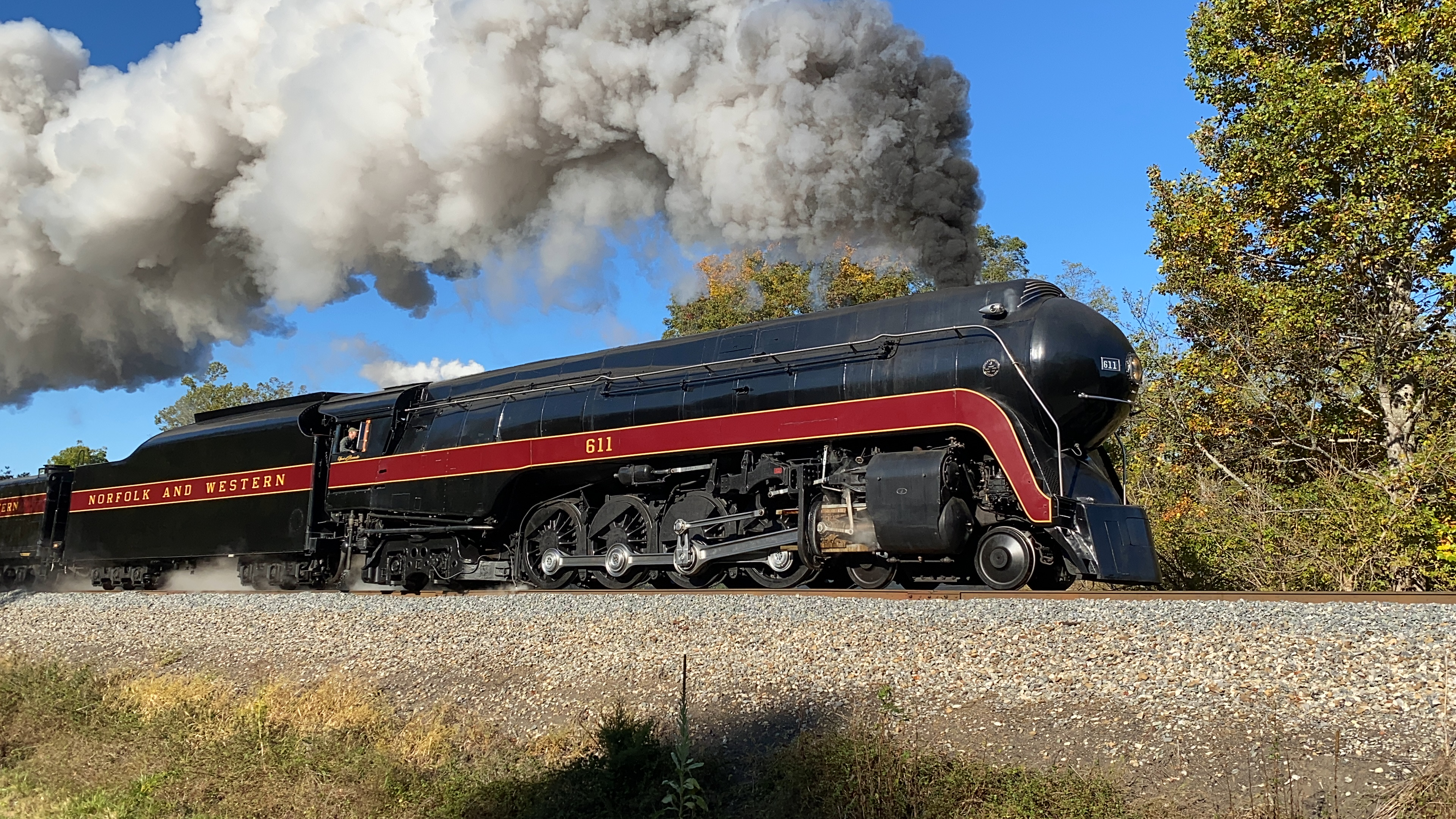
No. 611 passing through Craigsville, Virginia, pulling the Shenandoah Valley Limited excursion in October 2023.

In 2018, No. 611 was prevented from hauling mainline excursions by new restrictions on private charter trips imposed by then Amtrak CEO Richard Anderson. So the VMT operated the locomotive as a traveling exhibit; it visited the NCTM for its annual FRA routine maintenance and smaller events. On September 26, No. 611 returned to the VMT under its own power, but was thereafter forbidden to run on the NS mainline under its own power because it lacked a positive train control (PTC) system. The VMT sought donations to equip No. 611 with PTC.

In 2019, the VMT sent No. 611 to the Strasburg Rail Road (SRC) in Strasburg, Pennsylvania, for the five-weekend N&W Reunion of Steam events from September 27 to October 27. Lacking the PTC and cab signaling systems, No. 611 was paired behind an NS diesel locomotive for the trip. Upon arrival, No. 611 was reunited and ran with No. 475 for the first time since 1959. The first weekend of November found No. 611 back at the NCTM for in-cab experiences and caboose rides.

In early 2020, the COVID-19 pandemic restricted No. 611 to static display at the NCTM, but it was steamed up during the autumn season for in-cab experiences, cab rides, and caboose rides. In late April and early May 2021, No. 611 participated in more in-cab experiences, cab rides, and caboose rides, including a May 3 photo charter where it pulled NCTM's stainless steel passenger cars to recreate the time it used to pull the Tennessean passenger train in revenue service.

In late May 2021, the locomotive returned to SRC for weekends of excursions, in-cab experiences, cab tours, hostling tours, and whistle-blowing. (Note: The 611's first 2021 Strasburg excursion trips, scheduled for May 21–23, were cancelled by problems with the locomotive's mechanical stoker. These were fixed in time for the May 29–31 trips.) On July 2, No. 611 was sidelined by a broken leaf spring in its trailing truck, which was repaired in time for the next weekend excursions. In early October, the locomotive went into the SRC workshops for its annual FRA inspection and maintenance to its boiler staybolts. In 2022, No. 611 participated in more SRC events: in-cab experiences on September 30–October 2, cab tours on October 7–9, photo charters on November 9–10, and excursion rides on November 11–13.

On January 31, 2023, No. 611 was put on temporary outdoor display at the Railroad Museum of Pennsylvania, near the SRC. From May 21 to 29, it participated in The Farewell Tour weekend events of in-cab experiences and excursion rides at the SRC. It left the SRC on May 31 and returned to the VMT for display on June 2. On June 24–25 and July 22–23, the VMT offered behind-the-scenes tours around the locomotive and its history.

On September 14, 2023, No. 611 traveled from the VMT to the Virginia Scenic Railway's (VSR) Victoria Station in Goshen, Virginia. On September 30, the VMT and VSR offered in-cab experiences for guests to operate or fire the locomotive along the Goshen industrial track. On October 6, the locomotive hauled VSR's weekend Shenandoah Valley Limited round-trip excursions through the George Washington and Jefferson National Forests and the North Mountain grade between Goshen and Staunton, Virginia. Running on the Buckingham Branch Railroad (BB) tracks, these were the locomotive's first fall foliage excursions through Virginia since 1994. As there was no turntable or wye for No. 611 to turn around at Staunton, a pair of BB diesel locomotives were placed on the rear of the excursion train for the run back to Goshen. On the night of October 27, No. 611 was sidelined by a broken boiler staybolt; the BB diesel locomotives filled in for the next day's excursions. On October 29, No. 611 was repaired; it hauled some of the last Shenandoah Valley Limited weekend excursions on that day and from November 3 to 5. On November 7, the locomotive returned to Roanoke, where it idled at the VMT.

On December 14, 2023, No. 611 was added to the Virginia Landmarks Register by the Virginia Department of Historic Resources (DHR). It was also added to the National Park Service's National Register of Historic Places around February 2024. During that time, the locomotive was offline for maintenance and essential firebox repairs. On the last weekend of May 2025, No. 611, still under maintenance, participated in a 75th-anniversary celebration that noted its designation, along with No. 1218, as State and National Historic Landmarks. On September 18, 2025, No. 611 returned to the VSR to perform the Shenandoah Valley Limited weekend excursions again for the 2025 fall season from September 26 to October 26. Additionally, it pulled 10 leased passenger cars from the Steam Railroading Institute in Owosso, Michigan and two other cars owned by the BB. (Note: Originally, Pere Marquette No. 1225 was meant to pull the 2025 Shenandoah Valley Limited excursions, but major repairs sidelined it.) The VMT partnered with Rail & Road Auctions to auction four cab rides for guests to ride No. 611 on October 11, 18, 25, and 26. Also, on September 25, No. 611 was rededicated with a new ASME plaque on the fireman's side of its tender, replacing the original 1984 plaque, which was on display at the VMT.

On May 30, 2026, No. 611 was unveiled with the temporary American patriotic red, white, and blue vinyl striping, applied by SoVa Pro Vinyl of Danville, Virginia, to commemorate the U.S. Semiquincentennial celebration. The project is sponsored by Sunset Models 3rd Rail and inspired by the original concept artwork for the mid-1970s American Freedom Train (AFT) project where No. 611 was one of the locomotive candidates. The ten stars on the locomotive were referencing Virginia being the tenth state to ratify the U.S. Constitution and join the Union. On June 1, No. 611 returned to the VSR for the Summer of Steam excursion season from June 12 to July 5. It initially hauled the weekend round-trip excursions between Staunton and Afton Mountain, through the Blue Ridge Tunnel on June 12-21. Afterwards, on June 22, No. 611 lead a rare-mileage excursion out of Staunton to Gordonsville, Virginia, via Charlottesville. At Gordonsville, the locomotive was turned around on the nearby wye in preparation for the Louisa, Virginia-based excursions and the diesels took over for the return trip back to Staunton. No. 611 then haul other weekend round-trip excursions on the former Virginia Central Railroad (VC) line between Louisa and Gordonsville on June 26-July 4. It finished off the Summer of Steam event on July 5 with another rare-mileage excursion from Louisa to Staunton and the diesels would take over for the return trip.

== Accidents and incidents ==
- On December 2, 1950, No. 611 collided with a Ford automobile at a railroad crossing near Franklin Furnace, Ohio, while hauling the Pocahontas train No. 4.
- On May 14, 1952, No. 611 crashed into a tractor-trailer truck at a railroad crossing in South Point, Ohio, while hauling the Pocahontas train No. 3. The truck, belonging to the Telling Ice Cream Company of Columbus, Ohio, was making its way south to Huntington, West Virginia. The truck driver, who had dozed off and awakened by the wig-wag railroad crossing signals, narrowly escaped death before the train ploughed through the truck's trailer. No. 611's front end was covered with ice cream but was undamaged; it continued its trip to Cincinnati.
- On June 20, 1953, No. 611 was pulling The Cavalier when it struck a bakery truck at a railroad crossing in Chattaroy, West Virginia, injuring the truck driver.
- Four days later on June 24, 1953, No. 611 was pulling the Powhatan Arrow train No. 26 when it ran into the end of a tractor-trailer truck at a crossing near Ironton, Ohio, denting its bullet nose and crushing its front footstep on the fireman's side. It was repaired shortly afterwards.
- On the evening of December 7, 1954, No. 611 was pulling the Powhatan Arrow train No. 25 when it collided with a 1941 Ford sedan at McDermott, Ohio.
- On July 26, 1955, after No. 611 departed Cincinnati with the Cavalier train No. 16, it ran into a 1952 International truck at the city's Canal Ridge Road.
- On a cold winter night of January 23, 1956, at 12:51 a.m., No. 611 derailed with the late Pocahontas train No. 3, pulling 11 cars at more than 50 mph (80 km/h) around a 30 mph (48 km/h) curved track along the Tug River near Cedar, West Virginia. The locomotive slid down the embankment of the river and toppled onto its left side along with its tender and the first six cars while the last five cars remained on the rails, undamaged. (Note: The damaged cars were express baggage No. 123, railway post office No. 94, P3 class coach No. 539, three Pm class coaches Nos. 1727, 1729, and 1734. The undamaged cars were Pm class tavern-lounge No. 1722, De class diner No. 1022, and Pullman sleepers; Scioto County, Mingo County, and Ohio State University.) The engineer was killed, while the fireman, eight other crew members, and 51 passengers were injured. The accident gave No. 611 cosmetic damage to its left side, where its skirting panels, running boards, valve gear parts, and other appliance parts were completely torn off. The damage to the locomotive and its tender was estimated at $75,000. The locomotive and the six damaged cars were all repaired and put back into service. The tender received seam line dents, which was later removed during the locomotive's 2014-2015 restoration. However, its sand dome retained a large dent.
- On November 18, 1956, No. 611 struck a 1952 Buick automobile at Lincoln Street, while running light engine from Roanoke, Virginia, to Portsmouth, Ohio.
- On May 18, 1986, No. 611 was at the head of a NS employee excursion train from Norfolk to Petersburg, Virginia, pulling 23 cars through the Great Dismal Swamp in Suffolk, Virginia. Some were heavyweight and open-air passenger cars that lacked tightlock couplers. The train was running at 58 mph (93 km/h) with Robert Claytor at the throttle when two of the passenger cars struck a faulty switch on the mainline. They derailed, taking 12 other passenger cars with them. The locomotive, the first six cars, and last two cars stayed on the rails undamaged. Of the thousand or so employees and family members aboard, 177 were injured; 18 of the most seriously injured were airlifted to hospitals in nearby Norfolk for treatment. Eleven of the derailed passenger cars were repaired. The two damaged open-air cars, the Missionary Ridge and Queen and Crescent Club, were scrapped and another, the W. Graham Claytor, Jr., was donated to the VMT. After the wreck, the heavyweight passenger cars and open-air cars were retired from mainline excursion service since it was too difficult and expensive for them to be retrofitted with tight-lock couplers. The Great Dismal Swamp wreck was the worst accident in the history of the NS steam program.

== In popular culture ==
- Some of O. Winston Link's N&W steam-era nighttime photographs and audio recordings show No. 611 during its revenue service, including:
  - Link's Christmas Time at Seven-Mile Ford, Virginia photo shows No. 611 pulling the Pelican across the Holston River bridge near Seven-Mile Ford, Virginia, on the night of December 28, 1957.
  - On June 1, 1958, Link sat with his audio tape recorder in the mail car behind the locomotive's tender as it pulled the Cavalier train No. 15 from Roanoke to Williamson, recording for his album The Fading Giant: Sounds of Steam Railroading Vol. 2.
- Norfolk Southern's 1983 promotional documentary video Going Home showed the locomotive's first restoration and homecoming trip to Roanoke in 1982. The Ballad of 611, a song by the David Niblock Band, can be heard in the documentary.
- The 1984 WBRA-TV documentary Steppin' Out With Steam starred No. 611.
- The 1984 National Geographic documentary Love Those Trains showed No. 611 hauling a private legislative excursion to White Sulphur Springs, West Virginia, in September 1982. During filming, a really large mirror was used for the run-over shot.
- In the early 2000s, No. 611 was depicted on the Virginia Department of Motor Vehicles' Railway Heritage license plate.
- The Great 611 Steak Company restaurant in Roanoke is named for the locomotive.
- No. 611 was depicted in the 2015 children's book Dash Dupree and the Queen of Steam.
- No. 611 was the subject of the 2016 documentary 611: American Icon, which chronicles the history of the locomotive.

== See also ==
- Atlantic Coast Line 1504
- Baltimore and Ohio 4500
- Milwaukee Road 261
- Nashville, Chattanooga and St. Louis 576
- Reading and Northern 2102
- Santa Fe 2926
- Southern Pacific 4449
- Union Pacific 844

== Bibliography ==
- Boyd, Jim (2000). The Steam Locomotive: A Century of North American Classics (1st ed.). Barnes & Noble Books. ISBN 0-7607-1627-7.
- Bixby, Sr., Arthur M. (1992). "Resurrection of an Iron Horse". National Railway Bulletin. Vol. 57, no. 5. National Railway Historical Society. pp. 4–13.
- Coleman, Alan (2018). North Carolina Transportation Museum. Images of America (1st ed.). Arcadia Publishing. ISBN 978-1-4671-2775-2.
- Dixon, Jr., Thomas W. (2009). Norfolk & Western's Powhatan Arrow (1st ed.). TLC Publishing. ISBN 978-0-939487-91-2.
- Drury, George H. (2015). Guide to North American Steam Locomotives (2nd ed.). Kalmbach Media. ISBN 978-1-62700-259-2.
- Hensley, Timothy B. (1987). Steam Steel and Stars: America's Last Steam Railroad (1st ed.). Harry N. Abrams, Inc. ISBN 0-8109-1645-2.
- Hensley, Timothy B.; Miller, Kenneth L. (2021). Norfolk and Western Six-Eleven - 3 Times A Lady, Revised Edition (2nd ed.). Norfolk & Western Historical Society, Inc. ISBN 978-0-9899837-2-3. Archived from the original on September 14, 2023.
- Jeffries, Lewis (2005). N&W: Giant of Steam, Revised Edition (2nd ed.). Norfolk and Western Historical Society, Inc. ISBN 0-9704794-5-X.
- King, Ed (1998). Norfolk & Western in the Appalachians: From the Blue Ridge to the Big Sandy. The Golden Year of Railroading (1st ed.). Kalmbach Publishing. ISBN 0-89024-316-6.
- Loy, Sallie; Hillman, Dick; Cates, C. Pat (2005). The Southern Railway: Further Recollections. Images of Rail (1st ed.). Arcadia Publishing. ISBN 978-0-7385-1831-2.
- McClure, III, William G.; Plant, Jeremy F. (2007). Norfolk & Western Steam in Color (1st ed.). Morning Sun Books. ISBN 978-1-58248-216-3. Archived from the original on August 2, 2023.
- McKinney, Wayne (2014). Roanoke Locomotive Shops and the Norfolk & Western Railroad. Images of Rail (1st ed.). Arcadia Publishing. ISBN 978-1-4671-2111-8.
- Miller, Kenneth L. (2000). Norfolk and Western Class J: The Finest Steam Passenger Locomotive (1st ed.). Roanoke Chapter, National Railway Historical Society, Inc. ISBN 0-615-11664-7.
- Morgan, David P. (January 1983). "The finest steam passenger engine ever built, anywhere, anytime". Trains. Vol. 43, no. 3. Kalmbach Media. pp. 44–50.
- Nichols, Jim (1997). Norfolk & Western in Color Volume 1: 1954-1964 (1st ed.). Morning Sun Books. ISBN 1-878887-72-6. Archived from the original on August 2, 2023.
- Prince, Richard E. (1980). Norfolk & Western Railway: Pocahontas Coal Carrier (1st ed.). KP Graphics-Utah Division. SBN 9600088-9-6.
- Schramm, Jeff (2010). Out of Steam: Dieselization and American Railroads, 1920-1960 (1st ed.). Lehigh University Press. ISBN 978-0-9821313-7-4.
- Springirth, Kenneth C. (2010). Northwestern Pennsylvania Railroads. Images of Rails (1st ed.). Arcadia Publishing. ISBN 978-0-7385-7347-2.
- Tillotson Jr., Curt (2000). Classic Steam Trains of the South (1st ed.). TLC Publishing. ISBN 1-883089-55-7.
- Warden, William E. (1987). Norfolk and Western Railway A and J Class Locomotives (1st ed.). Andover Junction Publications. ISBN 0-944119-02-6.
- Wrinn, Jim (2000). Steam's Camelot: Southern and Norfolk Southern Excursions in Color (1st ed.). TLC Publishing. ISBN 1-883089-56-5.
- Wrinn, Jim (2015b). "Born to run in Tuscan Red, Black, and Gold". Trains. No. 2. Kalmbach Media. pp. 12–21.
