= Shad boat =

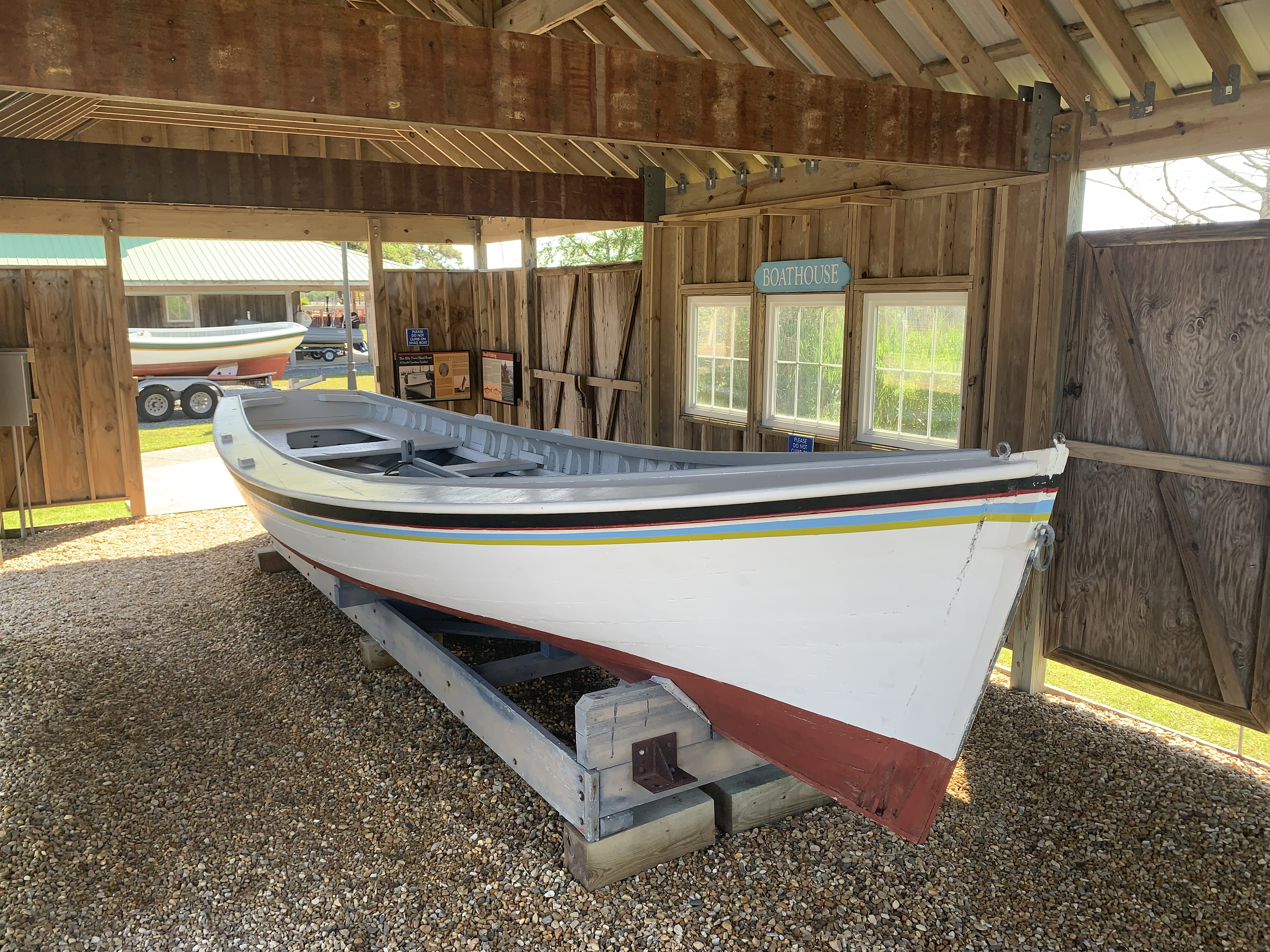
A shad boat

The shad boat is a traditional fishing boat which was proclaimed the Official State Historic Boat of North Carolina by the North Carolina General Assembly in 1987. One hundred years earlier, George Washington Creef of Roanoke Island built the first shad boat in North Carolina in the early 1880s. Creef shaped his boat hull from the root ball of Atlantic white cedar, also known as juniper, trees that grew along the shoreline of the pocosin wetland region of southeast Virginia and northeast North Carolina. The boat type is named after the shad which was the type of fish caught from the boats.

The Ella View was built in 1883 by George Washington Creef.

Shad boat built by Alvirah Wright in 1904. Located in the Museum of the Albemarle.

Initially, the shad boat had a round-bottomed hull and single mast rigged with a sprit sail. Oddly, the sprit rigged mainsail was often accompanied by a jib and a topsail. Later, in the early 1900s, the hull shape was altered into a hard chine "v" bottom to support an engine block. Once the "pickup truck" of the waters of eastern North Carolina, there are only a handful of relic shad boats left on Roanoke Island. One is on view at the George Washington Creef Boathouse in Manteo, where the curator, Scott Whitesides and volunteers replicated the Creef shad boat in 2002. Another shad boat, originally built by Alvira Wright in 1904, is undergoing restoration for eventual display at the Museum of the Albemarle in Elizabeth City. A shad boat is also on display at the Roanoke River Maritime Museum across the street from the replica Roanoke River Light in Plymouth.

== See also ==
- List of U.S. state ships The shad boat became North Carolina's state historic boat in 1987
- Shad fishing
