= Mike Greenly =

- Born: October 2, 1944 (age 81)
- Education: Duke University, NYU Stern School of Business
- Occupations: Speechwriting/coaching, Lyrics, Consulting
- Website: www.mikegreenly.com

Michael S. Greenly (born October 2, 1944) is an American writer, entrepreneur, and lyricist – and a former vice president of Avon Products—who helped to popularize interactive online journalism in the mid-1980s as a kind of forerunner to blogging. On March 26, 2015, Gov. Terry McAuliffe signed Senate Bill # 1362 making “Our Great Virginia” – lyrics by Mike Greenly, arranged by Jim Papoulis – as the official traditional state song of Virginia.

== Early online journalist ==
In 1983, Greenly left his position as a marketing vice president of Avon Products to become a freelance marketing consultant and writer. In an article for The Futurist magazine (March–April, 1987), Greenly credited the Alvin Toffler book, The Third Wave, as being a catalyst in his decision to change his life and become an active part of the Information Age.

Greenly has been called "probably the most widely read writer on "The Source", one of the first online services oriented to the general public and attracting 60,000 subscribers at the time.

Sometimes called "planet earth's first interactive journalist" Greenly and the two friends he met online – Sherwin Levinson and Diane Worthington – became the first journalists ever allowed to cover the Democratic and Republican political conventions via computer (in 1984). Greenly wrote a cover story for Portable 100/200 magazine (April, 1985) about using an early laptop computer to create this interactive, online journalism from the convention sites (Houston and San Francisco) and to answer reader questions and comments during the process.

Greenly went on to become the first journalist ever allowed to cover the Academy Awards ceremony by computer, again sending online reports of his interviews and experiences to readers around the world via laptop, and responding to them from on the road.

In 1986, a series of first-hand interviews Mike conducted about AIDS and placed online was published as Chronicle: The Human Side of AIDS (Irvington Publishers, Inc.). In 1987, Greenly received an award from the Computer Press Association in the category of "Best On-Line Publication" for his interactive electronic coverage of Appleworld, Macworld Conference & Expo, and Comdex '87.

== Corporate assignments ==
As his website notes, Greenly works today as a speech and presentation writer and speech coach for business executives. His client list includes Johnson & Johnson, Novartis, the Patrón Spirits Company, ExxonMobil, IBM and many other organizations.

== Songwriter/lyricist ==
Year	Title	Genre	Artist	Details
2008	“How Many Christmases”	Choral	Rosanne Cash & The Young People's Chorus of NYC (YPC)	Benefits YPC & Foundation For Small Voices
2010	“Get Up”	Dance	Kimberly Davis	#12 Billboard Dance Club chart
2011	“We Can Plant a Forest”	Choral	YPC	Benefits Trees for the Future Foundation (over 50,000 trees planted as a result)
2012	"I Know"	Choral	YPC	In memory of Stephanie Papoulis Benefits CJD Foundation
2013	“I Will Carry You" & "Not Gonna Miss You“	Pop	Shara Strand	”Born Tonight” EP
2013	“I Will Carry You“	Dance Remixes	Shara Strand	#23 Billboard Dance Club Chart, Benefits American Humane Association
2014	“With You”	Gospel-House + Remixes	Kimberly Davis	#4 Billboard Dance Club Chart, Benefits Alzheimer's Foundation of America
2014	“RSVP”	Pop/Dance + Remixes	Shara Strand	#32 Billboard Dance Club Chart, Benefits American Humane Association
2015	“Our Great Virginia”	Official Virginia State Song (Traditional)	Multiple	Signed into law by Gov. Terry McAuliffe
2016	"Say Yes"	Pop/Dance	Jason Walker	Billboard Dance Club chart
2017	"My Fire"	Pop/Dance	Nile Rodgers & Tony Moran ft Kimberly Davis	Billboard Dance Club chart
