= Sweet Virginia Breeze =

Musical composition and state song

"Sweet Virginia Breeze" is the official state song of Virginia. While collaborating in 1978, Richmond artists Steve Bassett and Robbin Thompson wrote "Sweet Virginia Breeze" during a rehearsal for their concert at Virginia Commonwealth University. The first studio recording of the song was on their album Together in 1978. Other versions of the song have been released by both Bassett and Thompson on some of their solo albums throughout their careers such as Thompson's 1980 album Two B's Please and Bassett's 2006 album “Blowin Dust Off.” In 2015, by a vote of 39–0, Sweet Virginia Breeze was designated the official popular state song of Virginia along with Our Great Virginia as the official traditional state song.
