= Our Great Virginia =

Virginia state song

- Regional anthem of Virginia
- Lyrics: Mike Greenly
- Music: Unknown, arranged by Jim Papoulis
- Adopted: July 1, 2015; 11 years ago
- Preceded by: "Carry Me Back to Old Virginny"

Audio sample
- Our Great Virginia: file; help

Our Great Virginia is the traditional state song of the U.S. state of Virginia. Adopted by the Virginia General Assembly in 2015, the song marked the end of an 18‑year period during which the Commonwealth had no active state song following the retirement of "Carry Me Back to Old Virginny" as "state song emeritus" in 1997.

Set to the melody of the traditional American folk tune "Oh Shenandoah", Our Great Virginia features lyrics by Mike Greenly and an arrangement by composer Jim Papoulis. The General Assembly designated it as the official traditional state song through HB 1472 and SB 1362, which also established Sweet Virginia Breeze as the state's popular song.

The adoption of the two songs received coverage from Virginia news outlets, which noted that the selections reflected an effort to modernize the state's symbols while avoiding the racial controversies associated with the former state song. Media reports highlighted the bipartisan support for the legislation and the emphasis on themes of unity, landscape, and Virginia’s historical identity.

== History ==
From 1940 to 1997, Virginia’s official state song was "Carry Me Back to Old Virginny". In 1997, the Virginia General Assembly reclassified it as the "state song emeritus" due to concerns about racially insensitive language, leaving Virginia without an official state song for nearly two decades.

In 2015, the General Assembly passed two bills—HB 1472 and SB 1362—designating two official state songs: Our Great Virginia as the traditional state song, and Sweet Virginia Breeze as the popular state song. Governor Terry McAuliffe signed the legislation on March 26, 2015, with the law taking effect July 1, 2015.

== Composition and authorship ==
Our Great Virginia is sung to the traditional American folk tune "Oh Shenandoah". The musical arrangement was created by composer Jim Papoulis, and the lyrics were written by Mike Greenly. The song’s text emphasizes Virginia’s role in early United States history and highlights the state’s geographic diversity, from the Shenandoah Valley to the Atlantic coast.

Mike Greenly is a New York–based writer and lyricist known for his work in corporate communications and for contributing lyrics to choral and inspirational music projects. Greenly became involved in the creation of Our Great Virginia after being approached by Virginia historian James I. “Bud” Robertson, who sought a new state song that would reflect the Commonwealth’s history and geography without the racial controversies associated with the former state anthem. Greenly has written lyrics for various musical collaborations and is active in community and charity‑focused music initiatives. .

Jim Papoulis is an American composer, arranger, and producer whose work often blends traditional melodies with contemporary choral and orchestral styles. Papoulis is widely known for composing and arranging music for youth choirs and international music education programs, and his works have been performed by ensembles around the world. His arrangement of Our Great Virginia adapts the familiar tune of “Oh Shenandoah” into a modern choral setting intended for broad public performance.

== Legislative process ==
The designation of Our Great Virginia followed committee consideration and bipartisan support in both chambers of the General Assembly. HB 1472 and SB 1362 were introduced to establish separate categories for a traditional and a popular state song, with Our Great Virginia selected as the traditional song and Sweet Virginia Breeze as the popular song. News coverage at the time noted that the new songs resolved the long‑standing absence of an official state song following the retirement of Carry Me Back to Old Virginny.

== Reception ==
Media reports described the adoption of Our Great Virginia and Sweet Virginia Breeze as part of a broader effort to modernize Virginia’s state symbols while acknowledging the state’s historical legacy. Coverage emphasized that the new songs avoided the racial controversies associated with the former state song and instead focused on themes of unity, landscape, and shared identity.

== Lyrics ==
The lyrics of Our Great Virginia are:

You'll always be our great Virginia.
You're the birthplace of the nation:
Where history was changed forever.
Today, your glory stays, as we build tomorrow.

I fill with pride at all you give us—
Rolling hills, majestic mountains,
From Shenandoah to the Atlantic,
Rivers wide and forests tall, all in one Virginia.

For each of us here in Virginia,
From farm to city dweller,
All of us, we stand together.
We're yours, we all are yours—
Across our great Virginia.
You'll always be our great Virginia.

== See also ==
- Sweet Virginia Breeze
- Carry Me Back to Old Virginny
- List of U.S. state songs
