= Carry Me Back to Old Virginny =

Song by James A. Bland

- Regional anthem of Virginia
- Also known as: Carry Me Back to Old Virginia
- Lyrics: James A. Bland
- Music: James A. Bland
- Published: 1878 by J.F. Perry & Co.
- Adopted: 1940
- Relinquished: 1 July 1997
- Succeeded by: Our Great Virginia

"Carry Me Back to Old Virginny" is a song written circa 1878 by James A. Bland (1854–1911), an African-American composer and minstrel performer. It was Virginia's state song from 1940 until 1997.

There is some evidence suggesting that it is an adaptation of "Carry Me Back to Ole Virginny" ("De Floating Scow of Ole Virginia") which had been popular since the 1840s and was sung by Confederate soldiers during the American Civil War.

== As Virginia's state song ==
A third reworded version was Virginia's state song from 1940 until 1997, using the word "Virginia" instead of "Virginny." In 1997, it was retired as the state song, largely due to controversy over the lyrics' racial content (such as the narrator being a slave, and referring to himself as a "darkey"). In 1997, Virginia passed a law to designate "Carry Me Back to Old Virginia" as state song emeritus, but a resolution to initiate a study committee and a contest for writing a new state song did not advance as it was agreed to by the Virginia Senate but not the Virginia House of Delegates. In 2026 the Virginia General Assembly voted to remove it as state song emeritus, and Governor Abigail Spanberger signed it into law on April 13.

The song was representative of the commonwealth in many ways. "When Clifton A. Woodrum was in Congress, the House of Representatives couldn't adjourn until the honorable Democrat from Roanoke, Virginia with a rich and varied baritone voice led the body in a rendition of "Carry Me Back to Old Virginny".

In January 2006, a state Senate panel voted to designate "Shenandoah" as the "interim official state song." On March 1, 2006, the House Rules Committee of the General Assembly voted down bill SB682, which would have made "Shenandoah" the official state song. In 2015, "Our Great Virginia" was made the new state song of Virginia.

== Recordings ==
- Haydn Quartet (1901), recorded under the title "Carry me back to ole Virginie".
- Alma Gluck, whose 1916 version often is cited, without confirmation, as the first celebrity recording by a classical musician to sell one million copies.
- Rosa Ponselle recorded a version commercially on June 2, 1925. Broadcast recordings exist of her singing it in a General Motors Hour program of May 24, 1936 (Erno Rapee conducting) and an RCA Magic Key program of May 2, 1937 (Frank Black conducting).
- Nelson Eddy and Jeanette MacDonald in Robert Z. Leonard's 1937 film Maytime.
- Louis Armstrong and The Mills Brothers, recorded the song together in 1937.
- Frankie Laine released a version of the song as the other side of the "Mule Train" single.
- Virginia O'Brien recorded this song in her trademark deadpan style in a dream sequence for Martin Block's Musical Merry-Go-Round.
- Bing Crosby included the song in a medley on his album 101 Gang Songs (1961).
- Jerry Lee Lewis also recorded this song in 1963 for Sun Records.
- Ray Charles released a version of the song on his album The Genius Hits the Road; it also served as the B-side of his famed 1960 recording of "Georgia on My Mind."
- The Marching Virginians, Virginia Tech's marching band, regularly plays an instrumental rendition of the song, during its field shows and concerts.

=== Other languages ===
- The melody is a popular tune in Iceland, the lyrics by Páll Ólafsson are an ode to the plover as a sign of the arrival of spring.
- In Sweden, the melody is set to Christian lyrics with the title "Striden på jorden evig ej skall vara". Bo Andersson and Per-Göran Ekeroos, duet, with ensemble recorded it on 1966.

== Lyrics (Bland's 1878 version) ==
Carry me back to old Virginny.
There's where the cotton and corn and taters grow.
There's where the birds warble sweet in the spring-time.
There's where this old darkey's heart am long'd to go.

There's where I labored so hard for old Massa,
Day after day in the field of yellow corn;
No place on earth do I love more sincerely
Than old Virginny, the state where I was born.

[CHORUS]
Carry me back to old Virginny.
There's where the cotton and the corn and taters grow;
There's where the birds warble sweet in the spring-time.
There's where this old darkey's heart am long'd to go.

Carry me back to old Virginny,
There let me live till I wither and decay.
Long by the old Dismal Swamp have I wandered,
There's where this old darkey's life will pass away.

Massa and Missis have long gone before me,
Soon we will meet on that bright and golden shore.
There we'll be happy and free from all sorrow,
There's where we'll meet and we'll never part no more.

[CHORUS]

== Lyrics (Edward Christy's original) ==
On de floating scow ob ole Virginny,
I've worked from day to day,
Raking among de oyster beds,
To me it was but play;
But now I'm old and feeble,
An' my bones are getting sore,
Den carry me back to ole Virginny
To ole Virginny shore.

[CHORUS]
Den carry me back to ole Virginny
To ole Virginny shore,
Oh, carry me back to ole Virginny,
To ole Virginny shore.

Oh, I wish dat I was young again,
Den I'd lead a different life,
I'd save my money and buy a farm,
And take Dinah for my wife;
But now old age, he holds me tight,
And I cannot love any more,
Oh, carry me back to ole Virginny,
To ole Virginny shore.

When I am dead and gone to roost,
Lay de old tambo by my side,
Let de possum and coon to my funeral go,
For dey are my only pride;
Den in soft repose, I'll take my sleep,
An' I'll dream for ever more,
Dat you're carrying me back to ole Virginny,
To ole Virginny shore.

== Old Crow Medicine Show: Carry Me Back (2012) ==
Americana string band Old Crow Medicine Show's 2012 album, Carry Me Back, derives its name from 'Carry Me Back to Old Virginny'. The song with "such a pleasurable melody and such discomfiting politics that it has fascinated bandleader Ketch Secor since he was a kid in Virginia" led him to write "Carry Me Back to Virginia," for the group's album. As Secor reveals:

That song came from a story I was told as a kid. The Confederates ran out of men, so they got 16-year-old boys from VMI, just kids, to march up to New Market, Virginia. I imagine their pride and valor as they marched up that hill and their shock as they heard the screams of the horses in the smoke. I wanted to surprise the listener the same way, so I started off by extolling the virtue of war, then drawing off all that glory till the truth was revealed.
