= Chesapeake Bay deadrise =

Type of traditional fishing boat

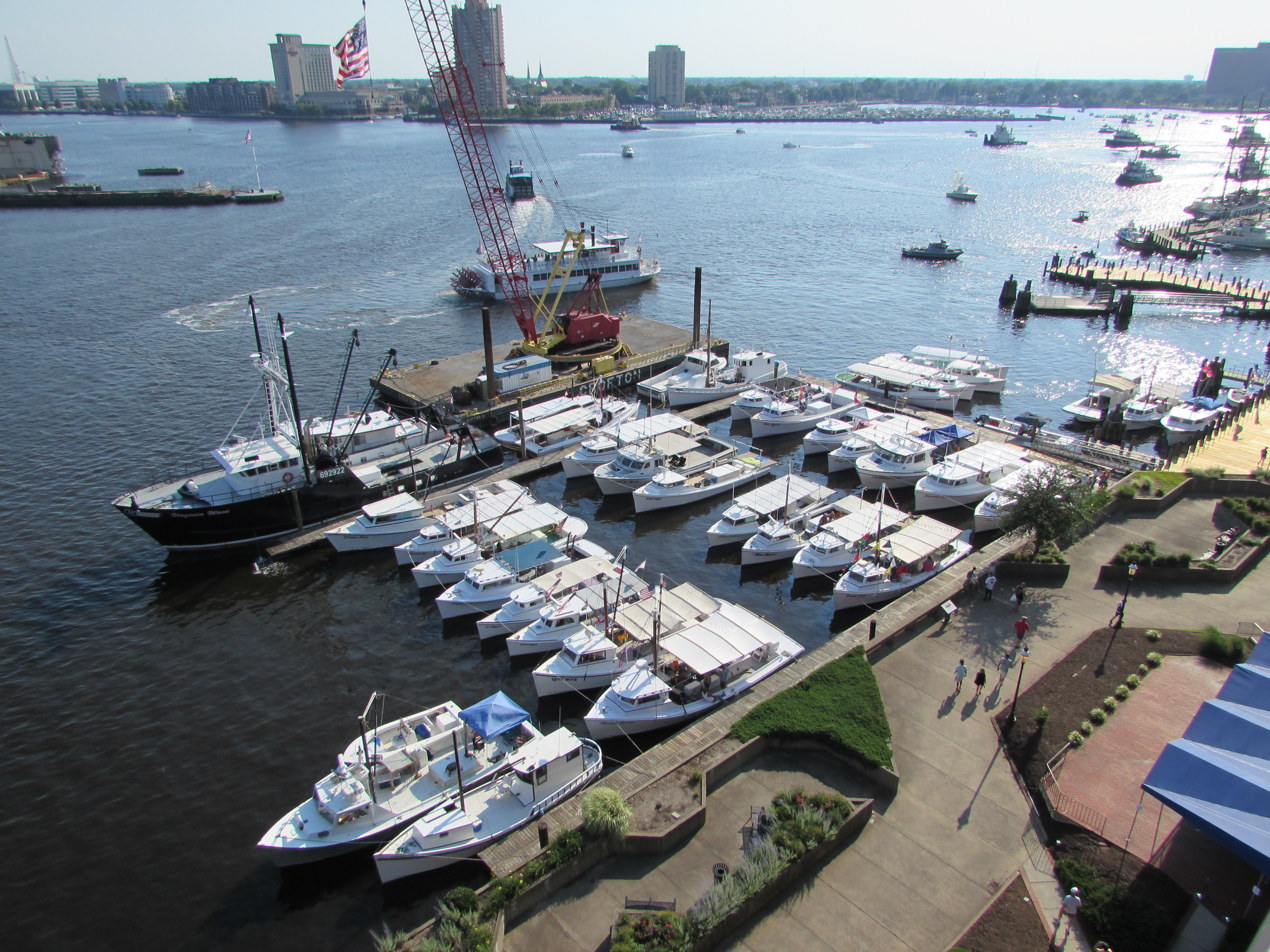
Workboats built in the traditional deadrise design on the Elizabeth River.

The Chesapeake Bay deadrise or deadrise workboat is a type of traditional fishing boat used in the Chesapeake Bay. Watermen use these boats year round for everything from crabbing and oystering to catching fish or eels.

Traditionally wooden hulled, the deadrise is characterised by a sharp bow that quickly becomes a flat V shape moving aft along the bottom of the hull. A small cabin structure lies forward and a large open cockpit and work area aft.

The deadrise workboat is the official boat of the Commonwealth of Virginia.

== Characteristics ==
Deadrise is the angle of the bottom of the hull in a cross-section view.

"Deadrise" refers to the line rising upward horizontally from the keel rabbet (the point where the top of the keel connects to the hull) to the chine (or sideboards). It rises on each side of the keel in a straight line, or "dead rise," creating the flat V shape of the bottom of the hull. The bottom of the hull is planked in a herring bone pattern with planks running diagonally from keel to chine. The sides are planked longitudinally. As a result, it is both useful in shallows and very forgiving when the Bay turns rough.

Though earlier types such as skipjacks shared a similar hull form, the term "deadrise workboat" is generally understood to refer to more recent engine-powered vessels.

== History ==
The design and construction of deadrise workboats evolved from the sailing skipjacks. One of the first types of purpose-built small powered fishing boats to appear on the Chesapeake Bay were the Hooper Island draketails of the 1920s and 1930s. The Hooper Island draketails featured construction similar to the sailing skipjacks, but were narrower as stability was not needed to carry a sail and a narrow hull made best use of the limited power from the available gasoline engines. As higher power engines became available, hulls became wider. Higher powered engines permitted higher speeds, which required sterns that were wider and flatter under the waterline to prevent the stern from squatting down in the water at higher speeds.

== Gallery ==
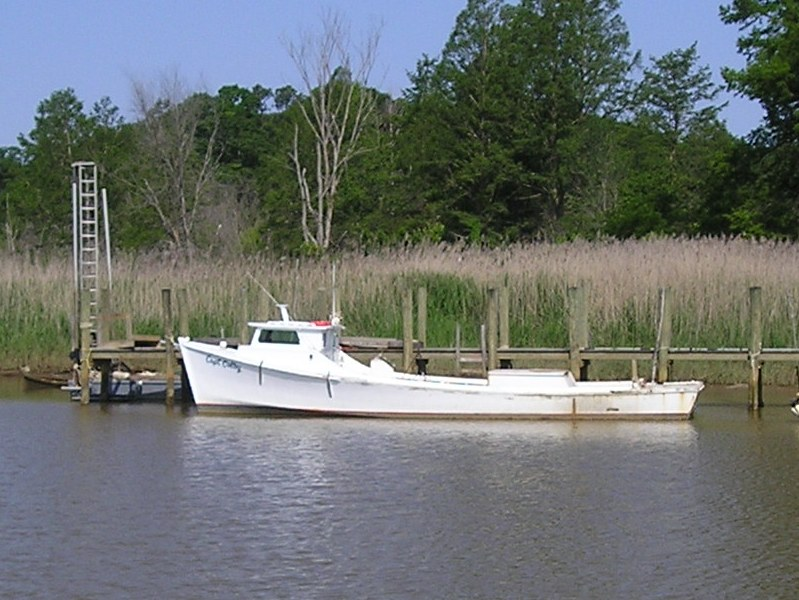
Deadrise workboat Capt. Colby at Tyler's Beach near Smithfield, VA.

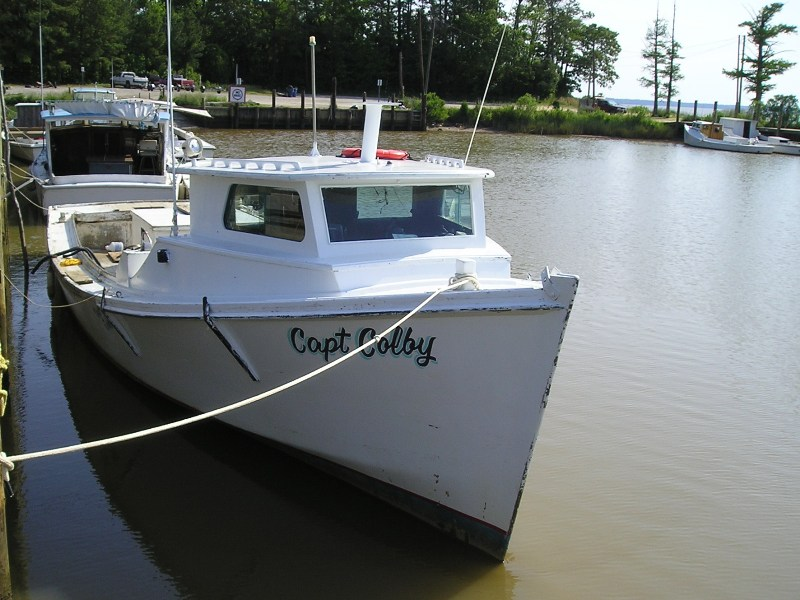
Deadrise workboat Capt. Colby at Tyler's Beach near Smithfield, VA.

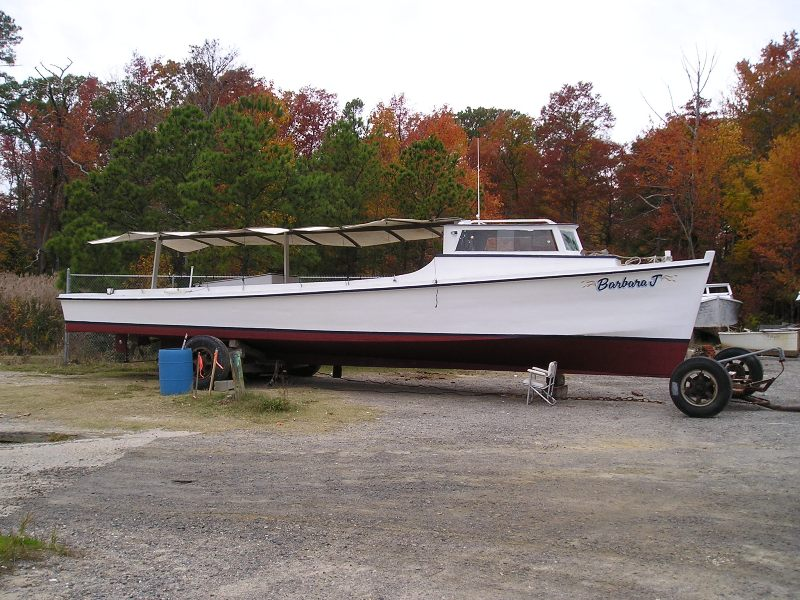
Deadrise workboat Barbara J at Tyler's Beach near Smithfield, VA.

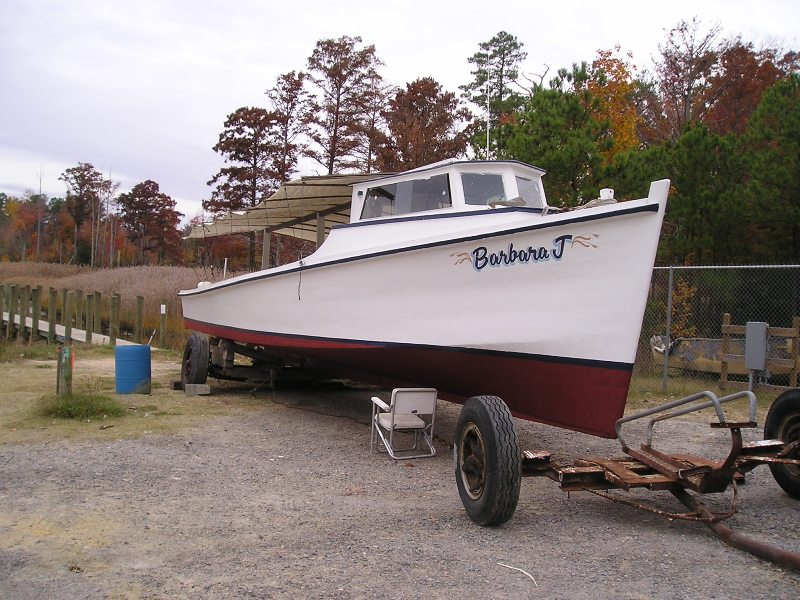
Deadrise workboat Barbara J at Tyler's Beach near Smithfield, VA.

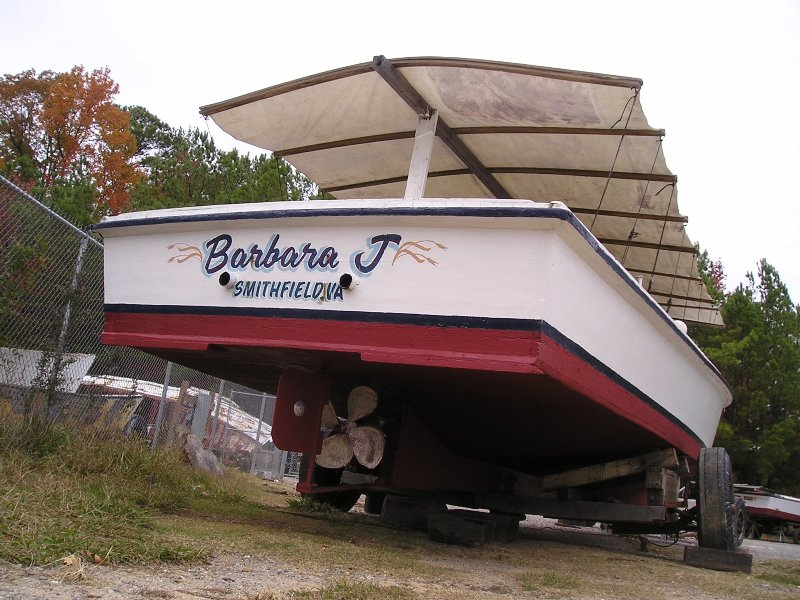
Deadrise workboat Barbara J at Tyler's Beach near Smithfield, VA.

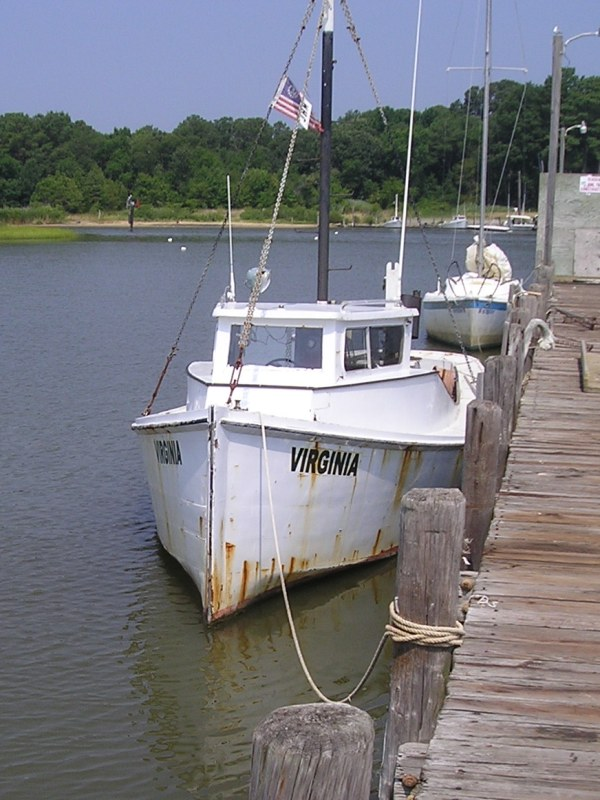
Round-stern deadrise workboat Virginia at Deep Creek in Newport News, VA.

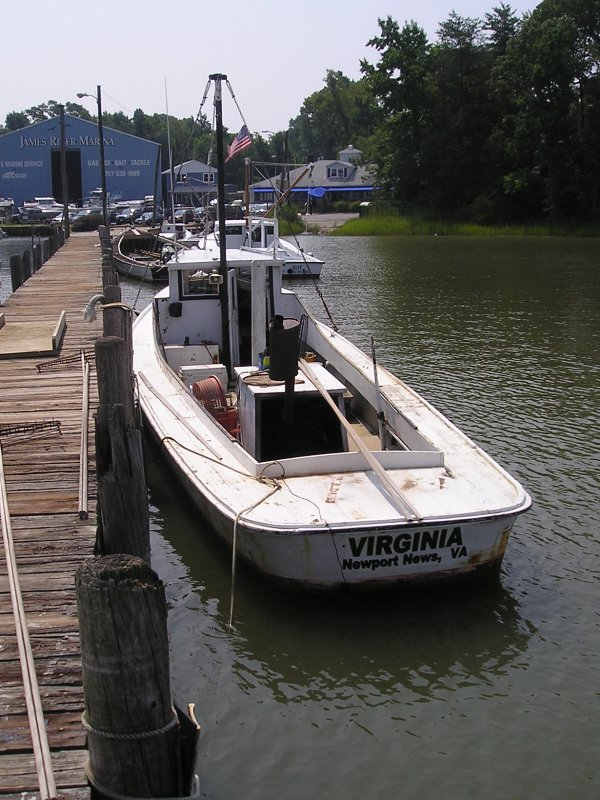
Round-stern deadrise workboat Virginia at Deep Creek in Newport News, VA.

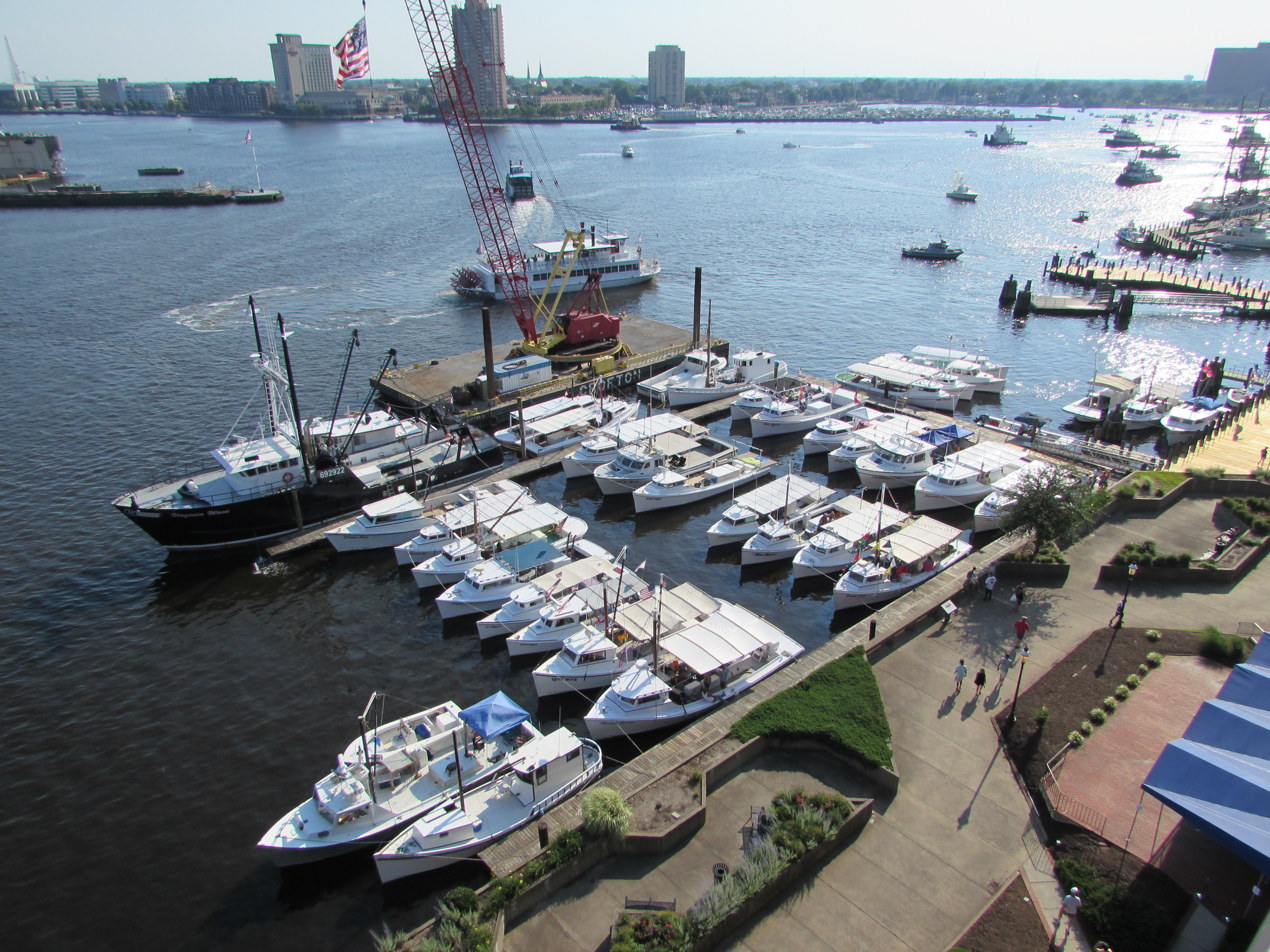
Chesapeake Bay Deadrises at 2016 Norfolk Harborfest

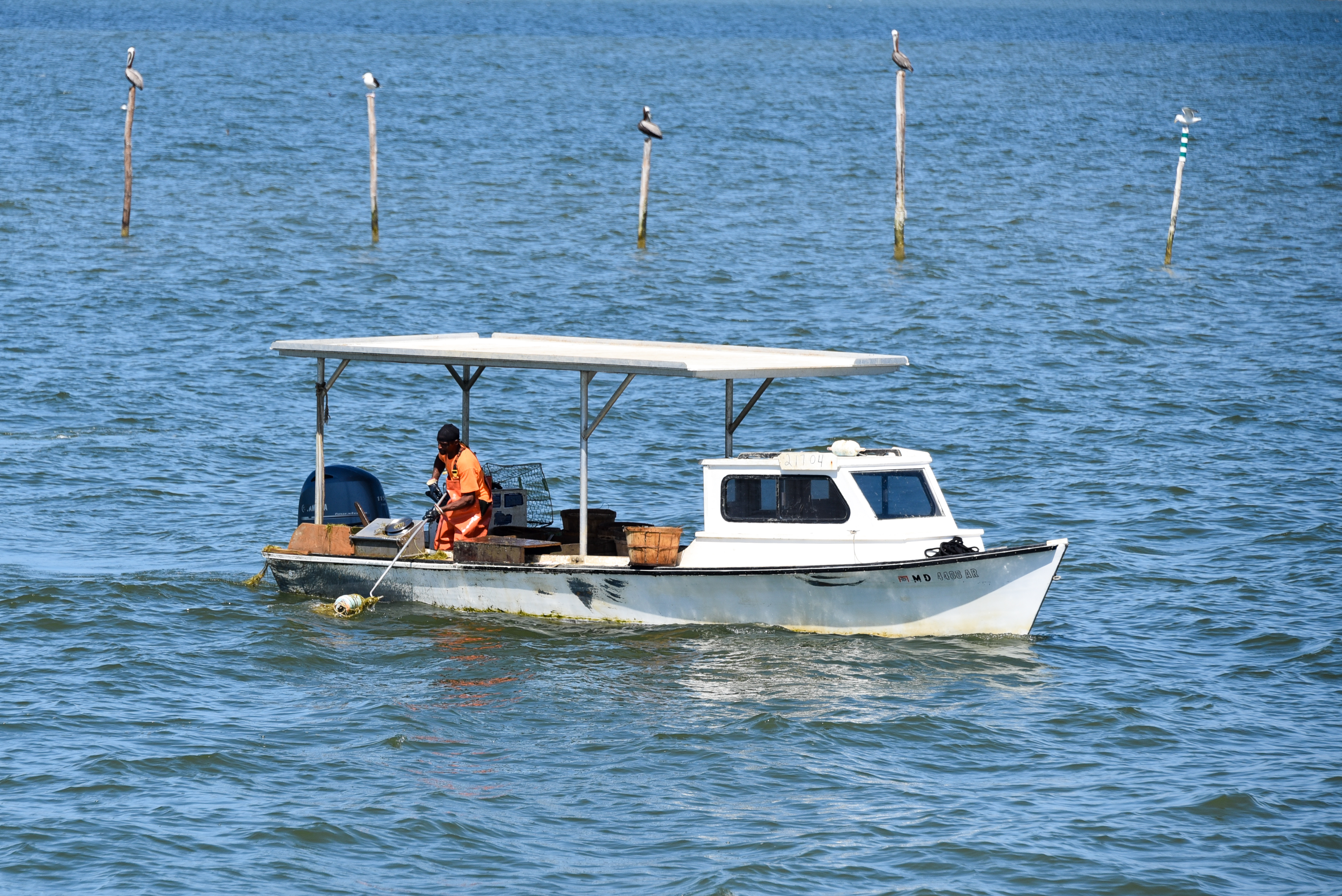
Chesapeake Bay deadrise workboat being used to catch blue crabs
