= List of U.S. state songs =

Official songs of U.S. states

Forty-eight of the fifty states in the United States have one or more state songs, a type of regional anthem, which are selected by each state legislature as a symbol (or emblem) of that particular state. Well-known state songs include "Yankee Doodle", "You Are My Sunshine", "Rocky Top", and "Home on the Range". A number of others are popular standards, including "Oklahoma" (from the Rodgers and Hammerstein musical of the same name), Hoagy Carmichael's "Georgia on My Mind", "Tennessee Waltz", "Missouri Waltz", and "On the Banks of the Wabash, Far Away". Many of the others are much less well-known, especially outside the state.

Some U.S. states have more than one official state song, and may refer to some of their official songs by other names; for example, Arkansas officially has two state songs, plus a state anthem and a state historical song. Tennessee has the most official state songs, with 14 (including an official bicentennial rap).

Two individuals, Stephen Foster and John Denver, have written or co-written state songs for two different states. Foster wrote the music and lyrics for "My Old Kentucky Home", adopted by Kentucky in 1928, and "Old Folks at Home" (better known as "Swanee Ribber" or "Suwannee River"), adopted by Florida in 1935. John Denver wrote the lyrics and co-wrote the music for "Rocky Mountain High", adopted by Colorado in 2007 as one of the state's two official state songs, and co-wrote both lyrics and music for "Take Me Home, Country Roads", adopted by West Virginia in 2014 as one of four official state songs. Additionally, Woody Guthrie wrote or co-wrote two state folk songs – "Roll On, Columbia, Roll On" (Washington) and "Oklahoma Hills" (Oklahoma) – but they have separate status from the official state songs of both states.

New Mexico has two state songs in Spanish: "Así Es Nuevo México" is the official Spanish state song, while "New Mexico – Mi Lindo Nuevo México" is the state bilingual song.

Iowa's "The Song of Iowa" uses the tune from the song "O Tannenbaum" as its melody. The same tune is used for "Maryland, My Maryland" which was Maryland's state song from 1939 to 2021.

Arizona has a song that was written specifically as a state anthem in 1915, as well as the 1981 country hit "Arizona", which it adopted as the alternate state anthem in 1982.

In October 2026, governor Ron DeSantis added the song "Seminole Wind" by John Anderson to the list of Florida's official songs.

== Absences and removals ==
New Jersey has never adopted a state song. A resolution to declare the song "Born to Run" by Bruce Springsteen as the state song passed the Assembly, but failed in the state Senate as the song's lyrics depict a desire to leave New Jersey.

Oklahoma's state "rock song" from 2009 to 2011 was "Do You Realize??" by The Flaming Lips, but the state legislature vote was not ratified. The move was purportedly due to offensive lyrics and a band member wearing of communist symbols on a shirt.

Maryland had a state song until 2021. "Maryland, My Maryland" was removed due to pro-Confederate language, but no replacement was established.

Virginia's previous state song, "Carry Me Back to Old Virginny", adopted in 1940, was relegated to "state song emeritus" in 1997 and repealed entirely in 2026 due to language deemed racist by the Virginia General Assembly. In 2015, "Our Great Virginia" was made the new state song of Virginia.

In 2021, Louisiana made "You Are My Sunshine" their only official state song by removing the less-popular "Give Me Louisiana". "You Are My Sunshine" was so popular that many Louisiana residents, including state legislators, were unaware that a second official song existed prior to the proposed removal. "Southern Nights" was added at the same time as the removal, but given a new designation as a state cultural song.

== State songs ==
State	State song	Composer(s)	Lyricist(s)	Year adopted
Alabama	"Alabama"	Edna Gockel Gussen	Julia S. Tutwiler	1931
Alaska	"Alaska's Flag"	Elinor Dusenbury	Marie Drake	1955
Arizona	State song: "Arizona"	Rex Allen and Rex Allen, Jr.	Rex Allen and Rex Allen, Jr.	1981
Arizona	State anthem: "Arizona March Song"	Maurice Blumenthal	Margaret Rowe Clifford	1919
Arkansas	State anthem: "Arkansas"	Eva Ware Barnett	Eva Ware Barnett	1917/1987
Arkansas	"Arkansas (You Run Deep in Me)"	Wayland Holyfield	Wayland Holyfield	1987
Arkansas	"Oh, Arkansas"	Terry Rose and Gary Klaff	Terry Rose and Gary Klaff	1987
Arkansas	State historic song: "Arkansas Traveler"	Sandford C. Faulkner	State Song Selection Committee	1949/1987
California	"I Love You, California"	Abraham F. Frankenstein	F. B. Silverwood	1951
Colorado	"Where the Columbines Grow"	A.J. Fynn		1915
Colorado	"Rocky Mountain High"	John Denver and Mike Taylor	John Denver	2007
Connecticut	State song: "Yankee Doodle"			1978
Connecticut	Second state song: "Beautiful Connecticut Waltz"	Joseph Leggo		2013
Connecticut	State cantata: "The Nutmeg"	Stanley L. Ralph		2003
Connecticut	State polka: "Ballroom Polka"	Ray Henry		2013
Delaware	"Our Delaware"	Will M. S. Brown	George Beswick Hynson	1925
Florida	Official song: "Old Folks at Home (Swanee River)" (with revised lyrics)	Stephen Foster	Original: Stephen Foster; Adapted: Stephen Foster Memorial at the University of Pittsburgh	1935 (original lyrics); 2008 (revised lyrics)
Florida	Official poem: "I Am Florida"	Walter "Clyde" Orange	Allen Autry Sr.	2013
Florida	State anthem: "Florida (Where the Sawgrass Meets the Sky)"	Jan Hinton		2008
Florida	State anthem: "Seminole Wind"	John Anderson		2026
Georgia	"Georgia on My Mind", sung by Ray Charles	Hoagy Carmichael	Stuart Gorrell	1979
Hawaii	State anthem: "Hawaiʻi Ponoʻī"	Henri Berger	King David Kalākaua	1967
Idaho	"Here We Have Idaho"	Sallie Hume Douglas	McKinley Helm and Albert J. Tompkins	1931
Illinois	"Illinois"	Archibald Johnston	Charles H. Chamberlain	1925
Indiana	"On the Banks of the Wabash, Far Away"	Paul Dresser		1913
Iowa	"The Song of Iowa"	Lauriger Horatius	S. H. M. Byers	1911
Iowa	Official Companion State Song: "Make Me a World in Iowa"	Effie Burt		2006
Kansas	"Home on the Range"	Daniel E. Kelley	Brewster M. Higley	1947
Kansas	Official state march: "The Kansas March"			1935
Kansas	Official march: "Here's Kansas"			1992
Kentucky	State song: "My Old Kentucky Home"	Stephen Foster		1928
Kentucky	Bluegrass song: "Blue Moon of Kentucky"	Bill Monroe		1988
Louisiana	"You Are My Sunshine"	Jimmie Davis and Charles Mitchell		1977
Louisiana	State march: "Louisiana My Home Sweet Home"	Castro Carazo	Sammie McKenzie and Lou Levoy	1952
Louisiana	State environmental song: "The Gifts of Earth"	Frances LeBeau		1990
Louisiana	State cultural song: "Southern Nights"	Allen Toussaint		2021
Maine	State song: State of Maine	Roger Vinton Snow	Roger Vinton Snow	1937
Maine	State ballad: Ballad of the 20th Maine	The Ghost of Paul Revere	Griffin Sherry	2019
Maryland	None	N/A	N/A	N/A
Massachusetts	State anthem: "All Hail to Massachusetts"	Arthur J. Marsh		1981
Massachusetts	State folk song: "Massachusetts"	Arlo Guthrie		1981
Massachusetts	State ceremonial march: "The Road to Boston"	Unknown		1985
Massachusetts	State patriotic song: "Massachusetts (Because of You Our Land is Free)"	Bernard Davidson		1989
Massachusetts	State glee club song: "The Great State of Massachusetts"	J. Earl Bley	George A. Wells	1997
Massachusetts	State polka: "Say Hello to Someone in Massachusetts"	Lenny Gomulka		1998
Massachusetts	State ode: "Ode to Massachusetts"	Joseph Falzone		2000
Michigan	An official state song: "My Michigan"	H. O'Reilly Clint	Giles Kavanaugh	1937
Minnesota	"Hail! Minnesota"	Truman Rickard	Cyrus Northrop	1945
Mississippi	"Mississippi"	Bonita Crowe		1916
Mississippi	"Go, Mississippi"	William Houston Davis		1962
Mississippi	"One Mississippi"	Steve Azar		2022
Missouri	"Missouri Waltz"	melody: John V. Eppel arranged: Frederic K. Logan	J.R. Shannon	1949
Montana	"Montana"	Joseph E. Howard	Charles Cohan	1945
Montana	State ballad: "Montana Melody"			1983
Montana	State lullaby: "Montana Lullaby"			2007
Nebraska	Official: "Beautiful Nebraska"	Jim Fras	Jim Fras and Guy Miller	1967
Nevada	"Home Means Nevada"		Bertha Rafetto	1933
New Hampshire	Official: "Old New Hampshire"	Maurice Hoffman	John F. Holmes	1949; 1977
New Hampshire	Official: "Live Free or Die"	Barry Palmer		2007
New Hampshire	Honorary: "New Hampshire, My New Hampshire"			1963
New Hampshire	Honorary: "New Hampshire Hills"			1973
New Hampshire	Honorary: "Autumn in New Hampshire"			1977
New Hampshire	Honorary: "New Hampshire's Granite State"			1977
New Hampshire	Honorary: "Oh, New Hampshire"			1977
New Hampshire	Honorary: "The Old Man of the Mountain"			1977
New Hampshire	Honorary: "The New Hampshire State March"			1977
New Hampshire	Honorary: "New Hampshire Naturally"			1983
New Jersey	None	N/A	N/A	N/A
New Mexico	State song: "O Fair New Mexico"	Elizabeth Garrett		1917
New Mexico	Spanish state song: "Así Es Nuevo México"	Amadeo Lucero		1971
New Mexico	State ballad: "Land of Enchantment"	Michael Martin Murphey, Don Cook, and Chick Rains		1989
New Mexico	Bilingual song: "New Mexico – Mi Lindo Nuevo México"	Pablo Mares		1995
New Mexico	State cowboy song: "Under New Mexico Skies"	Syd Masters		2009
New York	State song: "I Love New York"	Steve Karmen		1980
New York	State hymn of remembrance: "Here Rests in Honored Glory"	Donald B. Miller		2018
North Carolina	"The Old North State"	E.E. Randolph	William Gaston	1927
North Dakota	"North Dakota Hymn"	C. S. Putnam	James Folely	1947
North Dakota	State Waltz: "Dancing Dakota"	Chuck Suchy		2025
Ohio	"Beautiful Ohio"	Mary Earl	Ballard MacDonald (1918); Wilbert McBride (1989)	1969
Ohio	Rock song: "Hang On Sloopy"	Wes Farrell and Bert Berns		1985
Oklahoma	Official state song: "Oklahoma"	Richard Rodgers	Oscar Hammerstein II	1953
Oklahoma	Official state waltz: "Oklahoma Wind"			1982
Oklahoma	State Folk Song: "Oklahoma Hills"	Woody Guthrie and Jack Guthrie		2001
Oklahoma	Official state children's song: "Oklahoma, My Native Land"	Martha Kemm Barrett		1996
Oklahoma	Official state gospel song: "Swing Low, Sweet Chariot"	Wallis Willis		2011
Oregon	"Oregon, My Oregon"	Henry Bernard Murtagh	John Andrew Buchanan	1927
Pennsylvania	"Pennsylvania"	Eddie Khoury and Ronnie Bonner		1990
Pennsylvania	“Pennsylvania”	Gertrude Rohrer	Gertrude Rohrer	1960
Rhode Island	State march: "Rhode Island"			1996
Rhode Island	State song: "Rhode Island, It's for Me"	Maria Day and Kathryn Chester	Charlie Hall	1996
South Carolina	"Carolina"	Anne Curtis Burgess	Henry Timrod; G.R. Goodwin (editor)	1911
South Carolina	"South Carolina on My Mind"	Hank Martin and Buzz Arledge		1984
South Carolina	"Carolina When I Die"	Patrick Davis		2026
South Carolina	"Richardson Waltz"	unknown		2000
South Dakota	"Hail, South Dakota!"	DeeCort Hammitt		1943
Tennessee	"My Homeland, Tennessee"	Roy Lamont Smith	Nell Grayson Taylor	1925
Tennessee	"When It's Iris Time in Tennessee"	Willa Waid Newman		1935
Tennessee	"My Tennessee"	Frances Hannah Tranum		1955
Tennessee	"Tennessee Waltz"	Pee Wee King	Redd Stewart	1965
Tennessee	"Rocky Top"	Felice and Boudleaux Bryant		1982
Tennessee	"The Volunteer State"	Nicholas Giallombardo	Franklin Nicks	2025
Tennessee	Official Bicentennial Rap: "A Tennessee Bicentennial Rap: 1796-1996"	Joan Hill Hanks		1996
Tennessee	"The Pride of Tennessee"	Fred Congdon, Thomas Vaughn, and Carol Elliot		1996
Tennessee	"Smoky Mountain Rain" (Never added to state code)	Kye Fleming, Dennis Morgan		2010
Tennessee	"Tennessee"	John R. Bean		2011
Tennessee	"Amazing Grace"		John Newton	2021
Tennessee	"I'll Leave My Heart in Tennessee"	Dailey & Vincent		2022
Tennessee	"My Tennessee Mountain Home"	Dolly Parton		2022
Tennessee	"Copperhead Road"	Steve Earle		2023
Tennessee	"The Tennessee in Me"	Debbie Matthas		2023
Tennessee	"Tennessee, Tennessee"	Wayne Jerrolds		2024
Tennessee	"Under a Tennessee Moon"	Kelly Lang		2024
Tennessee	"Tennessee, In My Dreams"	Makky Kaylor		2024
Tennessee	Official Holiday Song: "Rockin' Around the Christmas Tree"	Brenda Lee		2024
Tennessee	"Tennessee"	Drew Holcomb		2026
Texas	"Texas, Our Texas"	William J. Marsh	William J. Marsh and Gladys Yoakum Wright	1929
Utah	State song: "Utah...This Is the Place"	Sam and Gary Francis		2003
Utah	State hymn: "Utah, We Love Thee" (state song from 1937 to 2003)	Evan Stephens		2003
Vermont	"These Green Mountains"	Diane Martin (composer); Rita Buglass Gluck (arranger)	Diane Martin	1999
Virginia	Traditional state song: "Our Great Virginia"	Jim Papoulis (arranger), based on "Oh Shenandoah"	Mike Greenly	2015
Virginia	Popular state song: "Sweet Virginia Breeze"	Steve Bassett and Robbin Thompson		2015
Washington	State song: "Washington, My Home"	Stuart Churchill (arranger)	Helen Gordon Davis	1959
Washington	State folk song: "Roll On, Columbia, Roll On"	based on "Goodnight, Irene"	Woody Guthrie	1987
Washington	Unofficial state rock song: "Louie Louie"	Richard Berry	Richard Berry	unofficial
West Virginia	Official state song: "The West Virginia Hills"	Henry Everett Engle	Ellen Ruddell King	1963
West Virginia	Official state song: "This Is My West Virginia"	Iris Bell	Iris Bell	1963
West Virginia	Official state song: "West Virginia, My Home Sweet Home"	Julian G. Hearne, Jr.	Julian G. Hearne, Jr.	1963
West Virginia	Official state song: "Take Me Home, Country Roads"	John Denver, Bill Danoff, and Taffy Nivert		2014
Wisconsin	State song: "On, Wisconsin!"	William T. Purdy	Charles D. Rosa and J. S. Hubbard	1959
Wisconsin	State ballad: "Oh Wisconsin, Land of My Dreams"	Shari A. Sarazin	Erma Barrett	2001
Wisconsin	State waltz: "The Wisconsin Waltz"	Eddie Hansen	Eddie Hansen	2001
Wyoming	State song: "Wyoming"	George Edwin Knapp	Charles E. Winter	1955
Wyoming	State song: "Wyoming Where I Belong"	Annie & Amy Smith	Annie & Amy Smith	2018

== Federal district songs ==
Federal district	Song	Composer(s)	Lyricist(s)	Year adopted
Washington, D.C.	Song: "Washington"	Jimmie Dodd		1951
Washington, D.C.	March: "Our Nation's Capital"	Anthony A. Mitchell		1961

== Territory songs ==
Territory	Song	Composer(s)	Lyricist(s)	Year adopted
American Samoa	"Amerika Samoa"	Napoleon Andrew Tuiteleleapaga	Mariota Tiumalu Tuiasosopo	1950
Guam	"Stand Ye Guamanians"	Ramon Manalisay Sablan	Ramon Manalisay Sablan; Lagrimas Untalan (translation)	1919
Northern Mariana Islands	"Gi Talo Gi Halom Tasi"	Wilhelm Ganzhorn	David Kapileo Taulamwaar Peter; Jose and Joaqin Pangelinan	1996
Puerto Rico	"La Borinqueña"	Félix Astol Artés	Manuel Fernández Juncos	1977
United States Virgin Islands	"Virgin Islands March"	Sam Williams and Alton Adams		1963

== See also ==
- List of U.S. state, district, and territorial insignia
- Lists of United States state symbols
- List of regional anthems
