= The Palmetto State Song =

Song
- Published: 1860
- Songwriter: George O. Robinson

"The Palmetto State Song" is a song, composed by George O. Robinson and published in 1860, that became the first of several major Confederate anthems of the American Civil War. It was the first published Confederate sheet music. Robinson dedicated the song to the signers of South Carolina's act of secession. The text of "The Palmetto State Song" accuses the Northern states of attempting to impose their will upon the Southern people.

"The Palmetto State Song" is not the state song of South Carolina, known as "The Palmetto State". South Carolina has two official state songs: "Carolina" and "South Carolina on My Mind".
