= New Mexico state song =

There are two state songs for New Mexico, as the state has two official languages:

- The English-language "O Fair New Mexico"
- The Spanish-language "Así Es Nuevo Méjico"
