= Go, Mississippi =

Anthem of Mississippi

- Regional anthem of Mississippi
- Lyrics: William Houston Davis, 1962
- Music: William Houston Davis, 1962
- Published: 1962
- Adopted: May 17, 1962; 64 years ago
- Relinquished: July 1, 2022
- Succeeded by: One Mississippi

"Go, Mississippi" (copyrighted as "Go, Mis-sis-sip-pi") is the former regional anthem of Mississippi, and served as the official state song from May 17, 1962 until July 1, 2022 when it was replaced by “One Mississippi” by Steve Azar.

== History ==
=== Adoption ===
"Go, Mississippi" was written and composed by William Houston Davis (1914–1987) and copyrighted in 1962. (Note: Vol. 16, Part 5, No. 2, July–December 1962 (1963), p. 1199, "MIS-SIS-SIP-PI," Houston Davis (w&m); © 17 September 1962, Jackson Board of Realtors; EP167366) The copyright was assigned in 1962 to the Jackson Board of Realtors, who recommended it to the Legislature.

It was adopted as the official state song by House Concurrent Resolution 67 on May 16, 1962, during the Regular Session as General Laws of Mississippi of 1962, Chapter 654. The Mississippi Legislature had selected it from two compositions, the other being "Mississippi, U.S.A." (© 1960), (Note: Vol. 14, Part 5, No. 1, January–June 1960 (1960), p. 289, "Mississippi U.S.A.," Houston Davis (w&m); © 7 March 1960, Houston Davis; EU615600) also composed by Houston Davis. The House members met with the Senate in a joint session to listen to both compositions performed by a professional dance orchestra with the composer on drums and the Hinds Junior College Hi-Steppers dancing. The band then swung into a chorus of "Dixie" and, according to the UPI, everyone rose.

The song was enthusiastically received in front of 41,000 fans at a formal dedication September 29, 1962, by Governor Barnett in Oxford, as performed by the Ole Miss Marching Band during a halftime of an Ole Miss–Kentucky football game.

=== Background ===
"Go Mississippi" is the same melody as "Roll with Ross," which Houston Davis (Note: Vol. 13, Part 5, No. 1, January–June 1959 (1960), p. 453, "Roll With Ross; He's His Own Boss," Houston Davis (w&m); © 27 February 1959, Ross R. Barnett; EU564630) composed under a commission by Ross Barnett (1898–1987) for use as a 1959 campaign theme song for governor. The lyrics of "Roll with Ross" include the words:

Roll with Ross, roll with Ross, he's his own boss
For segregation, one hundred percent
He's not a moderate like some of the gents
He'll fight integration with forceful intent.

— Lyrics to "Roll with Ross" (© 1959)
The same melody as "Go, Mississippi" (© 1962)

The halftime was promoted, (Note: On September 28, 1962 – a day before the football game – the Jackson Daily News published the words and music to the song "Never, No, Never," by Tom Spengler, an advertising account executive, and Houston Davis. The sheet music ran in place of the usual cartoon on the editorial page and an editorial stated that the song expertly put the state's attitude to music and suggested that readers clip it for a possible mass rendition at the next day's football game. The song, an ode to segregation, declared that, at Ole Miss, "Never, never, never, shall our emblem go from Colonel Reb to Ole Black Joe." (Catsam 2009)) and is chronicled, as having been an anti-integration rally, led by Barnett, the day before the Ole Miss riot over the admission of an African American, James Meredith. The riot was not directly connected to the revised song, but its commission by the Governor – who was leading an official resistance to Federally mandated integration for Ole Miss – clouded the song's heritage. Governor Barnett had prevailed as an enthusiastic advocate for adopting his own campaign song as the official Mississippi State Anthem.

== Proposals to change ==
=== Introduction ===
There have been proposals to adopt other songs for various reasons, namely because of the current song's direct connection to a staunch segregationist holdout.

=== 1976 attempt ===
In 1976, Bill Alexander (née William Brooks Alexander, Jr.; 1921–2006), State Senator from 1960 to 1983, introduced a Senate Resolution to set-up a special committee of experts to receive compositions for consideration as a new official state song, including one titled "Mississippi" by William Shirley Haynie (1918–2003). In 1994, Charlie Pride, whose identity as a performing artist is linked closely with Mississippi culture, publicly expressed support of a group wanting to change it.

=== Attempts after 2000 ===
In 2000, State Senator William Gardner Hewes introduced Senate Bill 2960 to replace the state song with "Mississippi" by Edward Owen Miller. However, the bill died in committee. (Note: Senate Bill 2960 (2000): "An Act To Designate New Official State Song 'Mississippi,' And To Repeal Chapter 654, General Laws, 1962, Which Designated The Song 'Go, Mississippi,' As The Official State Song," sponsored by State Senator William Gardner Hewes, Mississippi State Senate) In 2003, State Senator Delma Furniss introduced Senate Bill 2217 to adopt "My Home Mississippi," by Delma Furniss, as the official state song. The bill died in committee. (Note: Senate Bill 2217 (2003): "An Act To Adopt New Official State Song; 'My Home Mississippi,'" sponsored by State Senator Delma Furniss, Mississippi State Senate) In 2011, songwriters Carolyn Sue Woods of Amory and John Riggs of Nashville led a concerted campaign promoting "I Miss Mississippi" as a new state song for Mississippi. In 2015, State Senator Robert L. Jackson, introduced 2 Senate Bills:

- SB2177 to authorize two official state songs, keeping the existing song, "Go, Mississippi," and adding "My Home Mississippi" (Note: Senate Bill 2177 (2015): "An Act To Authorize Two Official State Songs, Keeping The Existing Song, 'Go, Mississippi,' And Adding 'My Home Mississippi,'" sponsored by State Senator Robert L. Jackson, Mississippi State Senate)
- SB2178 to adopt "My Home Mississippi" as the official state song (Note: Senate Bill 2178 (2015): "An Act to adopt 'My Home Mississippi' As The Official State Song," sponsored by State Senator Robert L. Jackson, Mississippi State Senate)

Both bills died in committee February 3, 2015.

In April 2022, The song was officially changed to "One Mississippi" by Steve Azar. The bill was signed by Tate Reeves and went into effect on July 1, 2022.

== Lyrics ==
(Verse)
States may sing their songs of praise
With waving flags and hip-hoo-rays,
Let cymbals crash and let bells ring
'Cause here's one song I'm proud to sing.

(1st chorus)
GO, MIS-SIS-SIP-PI, keep rolling along,
GO, MIS-SIS-SIP-PI, you cannot go wrong,
GO, MIS-SIS-SIP-PI, we're singing your song,
M-I-S, S-I-S, S-I-P-P-I.

(2nd chorus)
GO, MIS-SIS-SIP-PI, you're on the right track,
GO, MIS-SIS-SIP-PI, and this is a fact,
GO, MIS-SIS-SIP-PI, you'll never look back,
M-I-S, S-I-S, S-I-P-P-I.

(3rd chorus)
GO, MIS-SIS-SIP-PI, straight down the line,
GO, MIS-SIS-SIP-PI, ev'rything's fine,
GO, MIS-SIS-SIP-PI, it's your state and mine,
M-I-S, S-I-S, S-I-P-P-I.

(4th chorus)
GO, MIS-SIS-SIP-PI, continue to roll,
GO, MIS-SIS-SIP-PI, the top is the goal,
GO, MIS-SIS-SIP-PI, you'll have and you'll hold,
M-I-S, S-I-S, S-I-P-P-I.

(5th chorus)
GO, MIS-SIS-SIP-PI, get up and go,
GO, MIS-SIS-SIP-PI, let the world know,
That our Mississippi is leading the show,
M-I-S, S-I-S, S-I-P-P-I.

== Sheet music ==
- "Go, Mississippi" (© 1962)

In E♭ major
Jackson, Mississippi: Jackson Board of Realtors (publisher) (© 1962)
OCLC 20005003

- "Go, Mississippi" (© 1961)

(manuscript)
OCLC 656249381

== Selected discography ==
Delta Recording Corp. recorded the original version of "Go, Mississippi" at its studio in Jackson, Mississippi, at 1653 Raymond Road. The label, which had an office in New York City in the early 1950s at 236 West 55th Street (Midtown Manhattan), was founded by Jim Bulleit (né James Albert Bulleit; 1908–1988) and Jimmie Ammons (né James Douglas Ammons; 1919–2001). Ammons's main occupation was that of a machinist in Jackson, Mississippi. Delta was noted for its custom recording work, which included recording weddings, church choirs, and college choirs. Delta also produced recordings for the foreign language department of Ole Miss. Moreover, Delta produced a multitude of jingles for numerous radio stations. Delta recorded radio stations all over Mississippi for ASCAP. When Mississippi was searching for a state song, the Delta Recording Studio reportedly recorded all the state university bands in search of the song that would truly be representative of the state.

Original recording

- Delta Records 133 (45 rpm) (released 1962)

Governor Ross R. Barnett Campaign Souvenir: 1959 Campaign Songs
Jerry Lane Orchestra, Maurice Thompson Singers ₳
Houston Davis Productions, Inc.
OCLC 874137334
133-657: Side 1

1. "Go, Mississippi" (© 1962)
  Jerry Lane Orchestra
  Houston Davis (w&m)
  OCLC 30057690

133-656: Side 2

2. "Roll With Ross" (© 1959)
  (audio on YouTube)
  Houston Davis (w&m)
  Maurice Thompson Singers ₳
  Orchestra conducted by Jerry Lane ‡
  OCLC 874142886
3. "Little Carrol's Last Stand" (© 1959) (Note: Vol. 13, Part 5, No. 2, July–December 1959 (1960), p. 1397, "Little Carrol's Last Stand," Houston Davis (w&m); © 12 August 1959, W.H. Davis; EU589029) †
  (audio on YouTube)
  Houston Davis (w&m)
  Maurice Thompson Singers ₳
  Orchestra conducted by Jerry Lane

† The copyright for "Little Carrol's Last Stand" was previously registered as "The Battle of New Orleans." "Little Carrol's Last Stand" was a political campaign attack song commissioned in 1959 by Ross Barnett, the prevailing 1960 gubernatorial candidate against Lieutenant Governor Carroll Gartin.

‡ Jerry Lane was a dance band leader and trombonist from Jackson, Mississippi. Former band members include Tom "Bone" Malone.

₳ The Maurice Thompson Singers were a small vocal ensemble from Jackson, Mississippi, founded and conducted by S. Maurice Thompson (1903–1973). Thompson, a radio broadcast pioneer, had moved to Jackson in 1935 to be an announcer at WJDX. In the 1960s, he was the station manager for WLBT.

== Notes ==
Original copyrights

Catalog of Copyright Entries, Third Series, Music, Library of Congress, Copyright Office
