= Hispanics and Latinos in New Mexico =

Hispanic and Latino New Mexicans are residents of the state of New Mexico who are of Hispanic or Latino ancestry. As of the 2020 U.S. Census, Hispanics and Latinos of any race were 49.3% of the state's population.

New Mexico's Hispanic population is largely native-born. Out of these, known as Hispanos, many are descended from early Spanish-speaking colonists, and form a distinct cultural group.

== History ==
The Spanish settlement began on July 11, 1598, when the explorer Don Juan de Oñate came north from Mexico City to New Mexico with 500 Spanish settlers and soldiers and a livestock of 7,000 animals. They founded San Juan de los Caballeros, the first Spanish settlement in what was called the Kingdom of New Mexico, after the Valley of Mexico. The colony grew steadily, although it was diminished by the Pueblo Revolt in 1680, which led to the murder of many Spaniards and Nuevomexicanos. Comanches frequently attacked Spanish and other Native American settlements. The only colonial governor of New Mexico to achieve peace with the Comanches was Tomás Vélez Cachupín, who administered the province from 1749 to 1754 and 1762 to 1767. On the other hand, under several colonial governments of New Mexico, including Cachupin's, the appropriation of Amerindian lands by Spaniards or Nuevomexicanos was prohibited under penalty of imprisonment or fine.

The mainland part of New Spain won independence from Spain in 1821 and New Mexico became part of the new nation of Mexico. The new 'Mexican' elite attempted to create a common identity out of all the classes and different ethnicities. Nationalists attempted to establish equality, if only legally, between these different groups. The Spanish settlers of New Mexico and their descendants adapted to Mexican citizenship somewhat even though there was a great deal of tension during this period—as was the case in many places in early Mexico. In 1836, after the Republic of Texas gained independence, Texas claimed part of the province of New Mexico, which was disputed by Mexico. In 1841, the Texans sent an expedition to occupy the area, but the expedition was captured by Mexican troops. Despite this, western Spanish New Mexico was eventually annexed by Texas.

The U.S. won the Mexican–American War (1846–1848) and in the Treaty of Guadalupe Hidalgo (1848), Mexico ceded to the U.S. the northwestern Mexico (present-day southwestern USA), including most of present-day New Mexico. On June 8, 1854, the United States bought 29,670-square-mile of land from Mexico. This purchase, called Gadsden Purchase, consisted of the present-day southern Arizona and southwestern New Mexico. Since its incorporation into the US, many Hispanics, mostly Mexicans, have migrated to New Mexico to improve their social conditions and provide better education for their children.

In January 1912, after decades of colonial status, New Mexico became an American state, and Anglophones eventually became the majority population but census documents indicate that Spanish and English remained about equal in usage through the 1960s. The state today still has the highest percentage of Spanish-speakers of any state.

The Nuevomexicanos became an economically disadvantaged population in the state, becoming virtual second-class citizens compared with the Anglos. The Nuevomexicanos suffered discrimination from Anglophone Americans, who also questioned the loyalty of these new American citizens. The cultures of Nuevomexicanos and immigrant Anglophones eventually mixed to some degree, as was the case with immigrants in other parts of the United States.

== Demographics ==
Among U.S. states, New Mexico has the highest percentage of Hispanic ancestry, at 47 percent (as of July 1, 2012), including descendants of Spanish colonists and recent immigrants from Hispanic America.

Women make up approximately 51% of the population. 83% of New Mexico's Hispanics were native-born and 17% foreign-born. Many Hispanics in New Mexico claim a Spanish ancestry, especially in the northern part of the state. These people are the descendants of Spanish-speaking colonists who arrived during the 16th, 17th, and 18th centuries, often referred to as Hispanos.

According to the 2000 U.S. census, 28.76% of the population aged 5 and older speak Spanish at home. Speakers of Traditional New Mexican Spanish dialect are mainly descendants of Spanish-speaking colonists who arrived in New Mexico in the 16th, 17th and 18th centuries.

=== Ancestries ===
According to the 2000 United States census, two of the top five most commonly claimed ancestry groups in New Mexico were:,

- (Mexico) Mexican (16.3%)
- (Spain) Spanish (9.3%)

(self-identified ethnicity, not by birthplace)
| Ancestry by origin (2019 surveys) | Population | % |
|---|---|---|
| Argentine | 1,318 | 0.13% |
| Bolivian | 199 | 0.02% |
| Chilean | 625 | 0.06% |
| Colombian | 3,239 | 0.31% |
| Costa Rican | 995 | 0.10% |
| Cuban | 7,317 | 0.71% |
| Dominican | 939 | 0.09% |
| Ecuadorian | 599 | 0.06% |
| Guatemalan | 2,302 | 0.22% |
| Honduran | 1,210 | 0.12% |
| Mexican | 672,106 | 65.07% |
| Nicaraguan | 637 | 0.06% |
| Panamanian | 1,034 | 0.10% |
| Paraguayan | 0 | 0.00% |
| Peruvian | 1,846 | 0.18% |
| Puerto Rican | 8,907 | 0.86% |
| Salvadoran | 2,644 | 0.26% |
| "Spanish" | 69,947 | 6.77% |
| "Spaniard" | 74,788 | 7.24% |
| "Spanish American" | 4,903 | 0.47% |
| Uruguayan | 54 | 0.01% |
| Venezuelan | 1,416 | 0.14% |
| All other | 325,540 | 31.52% |
| Total | 1,032,950 | 100.00% |

| Ancestry by region (2010 census) | Number | % |
|---|---|---|
| Mexican | 590,890 | 28.70% |
| Caribbean | 12,754 | 0.60% |
| Central American | 6,621 | 0.30% |
| South American | 4,841 | 0.20% |
| Other Hispanic | 338,297 | 16.40% |
| Total | 953,403 | 46.20% |

== New Mexican Spanish ==
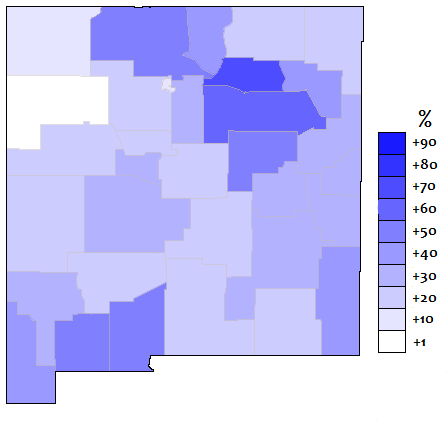
Spanish language in New Mexico by county.

The original state constitution of 1912 provided for a bilingual government with laws being published in both English and Spanish; this requirement was renewed twice, in 1931 and 1943. Nonetheless, the constitution does not declare any language as "official." While Spanish was permitted in the legislature until 1935, all state officials are required to have a good knowledge of English. Cobarrubias and Fishman therefore argue that New Mexico cannot be considered a bilingual state as not all laws are published in both languages. Others, such as Juan Perea, claim that the state was officially bilingual until 1953.

With regard to the judiciary, witnesses have the right to testify in either of the two languages, and monolingual speakers of Spanish have the same right to be considered for jury-duty as do speakers of English. In public education, the state has the constitutional obligation to provide for bilingual education and Spanish-speaking instructors in school districts where the majority of students are hispanophone.

In 1995, the state adopted a State Bilingual Song, New Mexico – Mi Lindo Nuevo México.

New Mexico is commonly thought to have Spanish as an official language alongside English because of its wide usage and legal promotion of Spanish in the state; however, the state has no official language. New Mexico's laws are promulgated bilingually in Spanish and English.

Because of its relative isolation from other Spanish speaking areas over most of its 400-year existence, New Mexico Spanish, and in particular the Spanish of northern New Mexico and Colorado has retained many elements of 16th- and 17th-century Spanish and has developed its own vocabulary. In addition, it contains many words from Nahuatl. New Mexican Spanish also contains loan words from the Pueblo languages of the upper Rio Grande Valley, Mexican-Spanish words (mexicanismos), and borrowings from English. Grammatical changes include changes in verb endings, particularly in the preterite, and partial merging of the second and third conjugations.

== Historic Hispanic/Latino population ==
=== Colonial and Mexican era ===
Population Statistics of Santa Fe de Nuevo México
| Year | Pop Spaniards/Mexican/Criollo/Mestizo | % pop |
|---|---|---|
| 1598 (foundation of San Juan de los Caballeros) | 500 (Spaniards) | % |
| 1610 | 600 (Spaniards) | |
| 1638 | 800 (Spaniards) | |
| 1680 | 2,500 - 3,000 (Spaniards) | |
| 1690 | 2,900 (Spaniards) (Note: 421 Spanish were killed by Pueblo Amerindians during the Pueblo Revolt. After a ceasefire was established with the Puebloans a decade later, Diego de Vargas took 800 settlers to New Mexico — soldiers, their families and servants.) | % |
| 1700 | 3,000 (Spaniards and Mestizos) | % |
| 1749 | 4,353 (Spaniards) | % |
| 1776 | 5,065 (Spaniards) | % |
| 1790 (Revillagigedo census) | 23,628 (mestizos) | |
| 1800 | 25,000 | N/A |
| 1810 | N/A | N/A |
| 1820 | 28,436 | N/A |
| 1830 | N/A | N/A |
| 1842 | 46,988 | N/A |

=== New Mexico as part of the United States ===
| New Mexico | Number of people of Mexican Origin (1900–1930) and of Hispanic/Latino Origin (1940–2020) in New Mexico^{[a]} | +% of Population of Mexican Origin (1900–1930) and of Hispanic/Latino Origin (1940–2020) in New Mexico |
| 1850 | Variable estimates: 47,000 - 52,930 - 60,000 (Spanish-speaking) | 86% |
| 1860 | 84,164 | 90% |
| 1870 | N/A | N/A |
| 1880 | N/A | N/A |
| 1890 | N/A | N/A |
| 1900 | 117,186 | 60% |
| 1910 | 225,837 | 6.9% |
| 1920 | 353,014 | 9.8% |
| 1930 | 643,044 | 15.2% |
| 1940 | 221 881 | 41.7% |
| 1950 | 248,633 | 36.5% |
| 1960 | 269,139 | 28.3% |
| 1970 | 379,723 (15% sample) | 37.4% |
| 1980 | 477 222 | 36.6% |
| 1990 | 579 224 | 38.2% |
| 2000 | 765,386 | 42.1% |
| 2010 | 953,403 | 46.3% |
| 2020 | 1,010,811 | 47.7% |

== See also ==
- Hispanos of New Mexico
