= Carolina On My Mind =

Carolina On My Mind may refer to:

- "South Carolina on My Mind", a song about the U.S. state of South Carolina
- "Carolina in My Mind", a song by James Taylor about his North Carolina childhood
- "Carolina in My Mind", an episode from the television series What Would You Do?
