= Maude Cosho =

American politician from Idaho

Maude Largent Cosho
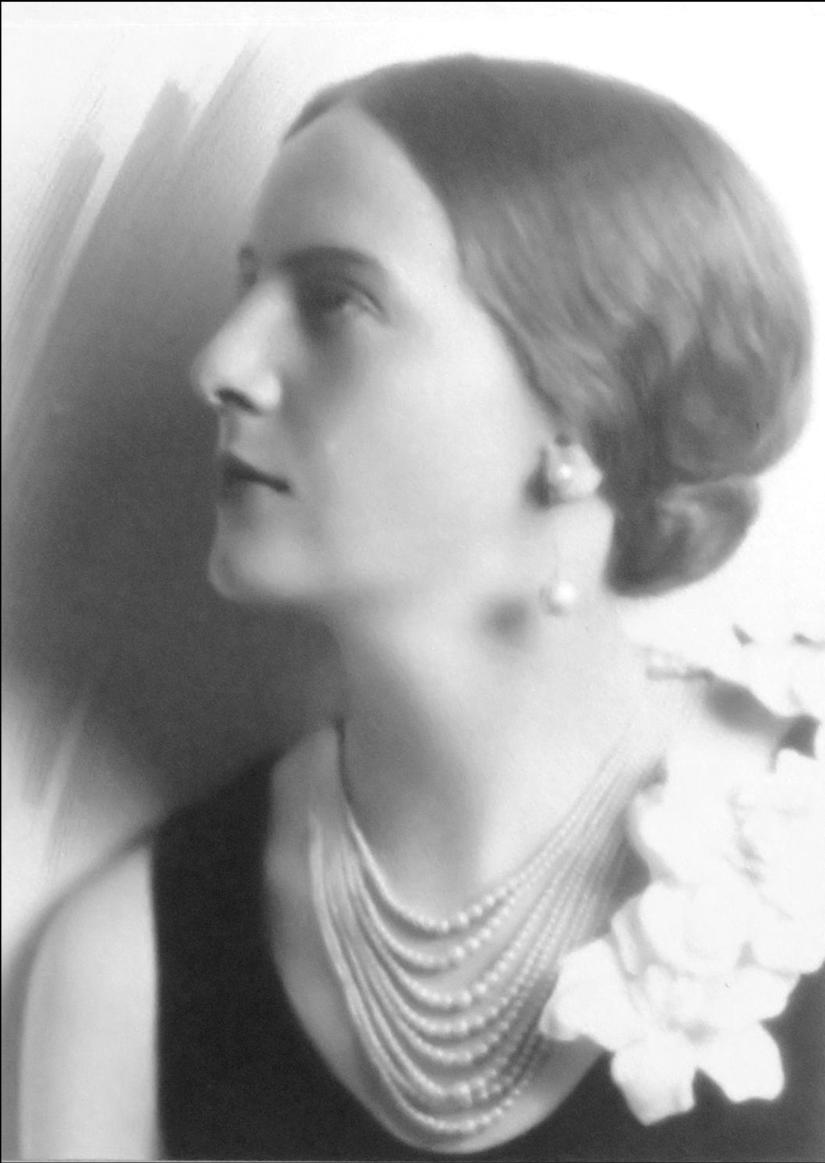

Member of the Idaho House of Representatives from the 1-15B district

Personal details
- Born: September 13, 1896 Belt, Montana, U.S.
- Died: August 29, 1981 (aged 84) Boise, Idaho, U.S.
- Party: Democratic
- Profession: Politician

Maude Largent Cosho (September 13, 1896 – August 29, 1981) was an American politician who served three terms in the Idaho State House of Representatives: 1931-1934 and 1937-1938.

Cosho was "the first Idaho woman to attain a position of real power in the state legislature". She served as Boise City Treasurer, Purchasing Agent, and Budget Officer from 1933 to 1935. In 1938, Cosho became the first woman in the United States to run for lieutenant governor. Cosho also worked as a hotel owner, teacher and realtor. In 1972, the Idaho Statesman honored Cosho with the Distinguished Citizen Award

Maude Largent was born in 1896 in a 3-room cabin near Belt, Montana. In 1907, the Largent family moved to Idaho, then relocated to Oregon in 1913, where Maude attended high school and university. She met her future husband, Harry Cosho, in Nyssa, Oregon. They married on June 22, 1921, two days after her graduation from the University of Oregon. Maude moved to Boise, where Harry had managed the Bristol Hotel since June 1919. They bought the hotel and had three children, John, Mary and Louis. After Harry’s accidental death in 1932, Maude Largent Cosho continued to run the hotel and raise the children while serving out the remainder of her first term in Idaho’s House of Representatives.

Known as “The Lady from Ada” during the 1930s, Cosho was an ardent supporter of women’s rights. She also had a droll sense of humor, as illustrated in press coverage of the passage of a bill establishing "Here We Have Idaho" as the state song: "Various representatives asked that the entire library committee, composed of the four women members of the house, stand at the desk and sing the Idaho song with [visiting soprano] Mrs. Russell. But to this suggestion Maude Cosho of Ada retorted, 'No. We want to pass the bill, not to kill it.'"

Although her bill allowing women to serve on juries did not pass during her tenure, Cosho repeatedly introduced it, stating, "I don’t know any reasons why women shouldn’t serve on juries. Since we’ve accepted all the privileges of citizenship, I’m sure we’d be glad to accept all the duties and responsibilities."

During World War II, Cosho joined the Women’s Army Corps as one of its oldest recruits. In December 1945, she sold the Bristol Hotel. After the war, Cosho was appointed to the State Board of Education. Between 1946 and 1951, Cosho also served as regent to University of Idaho. She was married to (and divorced) Thomas Roper Houston twice: from February 10, 1946, to October 6, 1951, and from August 9, 1952, to October 7, 1954. In 1963, nearly a decade after Cosho ended her relationship with Houston, the president of the University of Idaho wrote to Cosho to inform her that the University Board of Regents had approved the renaming of two floors of the Wallace Residence Center in her honor—as “Houston Hall.”

In 1951, Cosho earned a Master's degree in history. Two years later, at the age of 57, she began a 14-year career teaching Tohono O’odham Indian children in Arizona. In 1967, Cosho moved back to Boise, and in 1973, wrote her autobiography, As the Years Roll By, for family and friends. During the last two years of her life Cosho wrote An Idaho Hodgepodge, a history of the state she called home.
