= Ganzhorn =

Ganzhorn is a surname. Notable people with the surname include:

- Jack Ganzhorn (1881–1956), American silent film actor and screenwriter
- Wilhelm Ganzhorn (1818–1880), German judge and lyricist
