= John Andrew Buchanan =

American politician

John Andrew Buchanan (October 2, 1863 – December 22, 1935) was a judge and politician in Astoria in the U.S. state of Oregon, and an amateur poet who wrote the lyrics to the Oregon state song.

In 1920 he composed the lyrics to "Oregon, My Oregon"; he and Henry Murtagh, who composed the music, entered the song in a contest sponsored by the Society of Oregon Composers. They won the contest; the song was published and endorsed by the state superintendent of public instruction. The Oregon Legislative Assembly made it the state song in 1927.

Buchanan was a school teacher and an attorney. He served two terms in the Oregon House of Representatives, for the 25th and 26th sessions (1909–1912). He wrote poetry throughout his life and published several books of poetry.

A new headstone was installed at his grave in Warrenton, Oregon in 2017, paid for by a crowdfunding campaign.
