= All Hail to Massachusetts =

Official state song of Massachusetts as of September 3, 1966

- Regional anthem of Massachusetts
- Music: Arthur J. Marsh, 1954
- Adopted: 3 September 1966

"All Hail to Massachusetts", with words and music by Arthur James Marsh, was made the official state song of Massachusetts on September 3, 1966, and codified by an act of the General Court in 1966. The song, written originally in the Spring of 1954 by Marsh, a Wellesley music teacher who intended to make it an official anthem, was first performed on August 15, 1954, at the bandstand of Paragon Park, Nantasket Beach in Hull. Following three previous attempts by the legislature to designate a state song in 1958, 1961, and 1964, this song was selected as the state song in June 1966. The final commission which picked the tune was chaired by Arthur Fiedler, conductor of the Boston Pops, along with Erich Leinsdorf, with the support of fellow Boston Pops musicians Harry Ellis Dickson and Leo Litwin, and Peter Siragusa, then-director of music for Boston Public Schools. The commission's legislators were state senator James A. Kelly Jr., as well as representatives David M. Bartley and John M. Melia. With its enactment as the state song, it entered the public domain, with the act including a "properly executed transfer of the copyright to said song to the commonwealth."

Marsh's song beat out other contenders, including a submission by Dedham's Charlotte Parson Noyes entitled "Massachusetts! Behold Her!" In 1981 the General Court amended the act to include the song "Massachusetts," words and music by Arlo Guthrie, as the state's official "Folk" song, however this amending act did not transfer the rights to Guthrie's song to the Secretary of the Commonwealth.
