= Ben Cosgrove =

American composer and musician (born 1988)

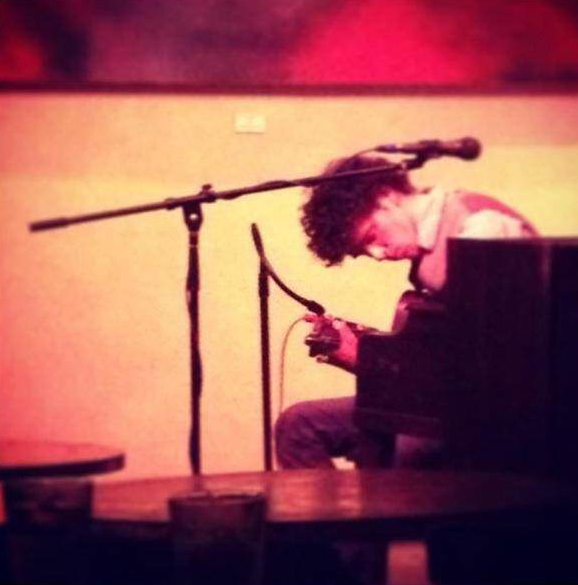
- Cosgrove playing live in Boulder, Colorado in 2013

Background information
- Born: January 30, 1988 (age 38)
- Genre: Instrumental
- Occupations: Composer, Multi-instrumentalist, Producer
- Instruments: piano, keyboards, organ, accordion, upright bass, guitar, percussion, trumpet, trombone, euphonium, violin, field recordings
- Years active: 2010–present
- Formerly of: The Ghost of Paul Revere
- Website: bencosgrove.com
- Education: Harvard University

Ben Cosgrove (born 30 January 1988) is an American composer and multi-instrumentalist from Methuen, Massachusetts, whose work explores the intersection of sound and place.

== Releases and recognition ==
His 2011 album, Yankee Division, is based on landscapes around New England, taking its name from the Yankee Division Highway. In 2014, he released Field Studies, an album exploring the wider American landscape, from the Sierra Nevada to the Everglades. In 2015, Cosgrove released a live album, Solo Piano, which features recordings collected from performances in thirteen different states. His 2017 studio album, Salt, is a concept record comparing landscapes of flux and ambiguity to personal tumult and emotional unrest. In 2021, he released the album The Trouble With Wilderness, titled after the William Cronon essay of the same name, about places that exist in between the binary of being exclusively either natural or man-made. In 2023, Cosgrove released Bearings, an album of songs improvised in the studio with the aim of drawing parallels to the process of trying to orient oneself in an unfamiliar place. His 2026 release, Topograph, is an album of songs about landscapes in states of active change, being moved and eroded by water and air.

In addition to his solo work, he often tours and records with other artists, including The Ghost of Paul Revere and Darlingside.

Cosgrove's landscape compositions are discussed in Conor Knighton's Leave Only Footprints (2020) and Matthew Doucet's You've Never Heard Your Favorite Song: 100 Deep Cuts to Make Your World Sound Better (2020). He has served as an artist-in-residence with the Schmidt Ocean Institute, the New England National Scenic Trail, the Signet Society, NASA, Isle Royale National Park, Acadia National Park, and White Mountain National Forest.

== Literature ==
Cosgrove also writes nonfiction essays that touch upon place, sound, and art. His writing has appeared in Orion, Northern Woodlands, and other outlets.
