= Beautiful Nebraska =

Nebraska state anthem

- Regional anthem of Nebraska
- Lyrics: Jim Fras and Guy G. Miller
- Music: Jim Fras, 1960
- Adopted: 1967; 58 years ago

Audio sample
- "Beautiful Nebraska" (instrumental): file; help

"Beautiful Nebraska" is the regional anthem of the U.S. state of Nebraska. The music was composed by Jim Fras in 1960 and the lyrics were written by Jim Fras and Guy G. Miller, prior to adoption as Nebraska's state song in 1967.

== Lyrics ==
Beautiful Nebraska,
Peaceful prairie land.
Laced with many rivers,
And the hills of sand.
Dark green valleys
Cradled in the earth.
Rain and sunshine
Bring abundant birth.

Beautiful Nebraska,
As you look around,
you will find a rainbow
Reaching to the ground.
All these wonders
By the Master's hand,
Beautiful Nebraska land.

We are so proud of this state where we live.
There is no place that has so much to give.

Beautiful Nebraska,
As you look around,
You will find a rainbow
Reaching to the ground.
All these wonders
By the Master's hand,
Beautiful Nebraska land.
