= State songs of Arizona =

The U.S. state of Arizona has two official state songs, although neither is named as such. The official state anthem is "The Arizona March Song" and the alternate state anthem titled "Arizona".

== State anthem ==
=== History ===
The lyrics of "The Arizona March Song" were written by Margaret Rowe Clifford in 1915. The music was composed by Maurice Blumenthal.

=== Lyrics ===
First Stanza
Come to this land of sunshine,
To this land where life is young.
Where the wide, wide world is waiting,
The songs that will now be sung.
Where the golden sun is flaming
Into warm, white shining day.
And the sons of men are blazing
Their priceless right of way.

Chorus
Sing the song that's in your hearts,
Sing of the great Southwest.
Thank God, for Arizona,
In splendid sunshine dressed.
For thy beauty and thy grandeur,
For thy regal robes so sheen,
We hail thee Arizona
Our Goddess and our queen.

Second Stanza
Come stand beside the rivers
Within our valleys broad.
Stand here with heads uncovered,
In the presence of our God!
While all around, about us
The brave, unconquered band,
As guardians and landmarks
The giant mountains stand.

Third Stanza
Not alone for gold and silver
Is Arizona great.
But with graves of heroes sleeping,
All the land is consecrate!
O come and live beside us
However far ye roam
Come help us build up temples
And name those temples “home.”

== Alternate state anthem ==
=== History ===
The alternate anthem, "Arizona," is a country-and-western song written and performed by Rex Allen and Rex Allen Jr. It was adopted in 1981.

=== Lyrics ===
I love you, Arizona
Your mountains, deserts, and streams
The rise of Dos Cabezas
And the outlaws I see in my dreams;

I love you Arizona,
Superstitions (Note: "Superstitions" is a reference to the Superstition Mountains in Maricopa and Pinal counties, and "Dos Cabezas," or "Two Heads" in Spanish, refers to a pair of twin mountain peaks in Cochise County.) and all;
The warmth you give at sunrise;
Your sunsets put music in us all.

Oo, Arizona;
You're the magic in me;
Oo, Arizona,
You're the life-blood of me;

I love you Arizona;
Desert dust on the wind;
The sage and cactus are blooming,
And the smell of the rain on your skin.

Oo, Arizona;
You're the magic in me;
Oo, Arizona,
You're the life-blood of me.
