= Give Me Louisiana =

"Give Me Louisiana" (French: Donnez-moi la Louisiane; Louisiana Creole: Don mò Lwizyàn) was the state song of Louisiana. It was written in 1970 by Doralice Fontane and arranged by John Croom. It was the only official state song of Louisiana from 1970 to 1976. In 1977, You Are My Sunshine was added as a second official state song. "Give Me Louisiana" was removed as an official state song in 2021, the same bill where "Southern Nights" by Allen Toussaint was added as the state cultural song.

== See also ==
- List of U.S. state songs
