= Oregon, My Oregon =

Anthem of the U.S. state of Oregon

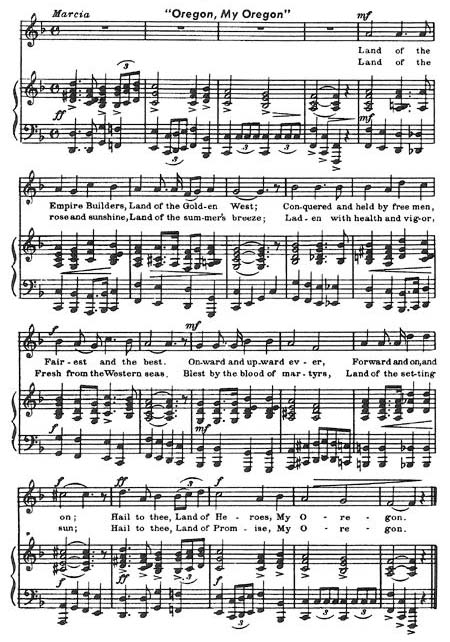
- Sheet music with original lyrics
- Regional anthem of Oregon
- Lyrics: John Andrew Buchanan, 1920
- Music: Henry Bernard Murtagh, 1920 (modified 2021)
- Adopted: 1927

"Oregon, My Oregon" is the regional anthem of the U.S. state of Oregon. Written for a song contest in 1920, the 16-line, 2-verse song became the state's official state song in 1927.

The lyrics, widely considered to convey racist sentiments, were updated by an act of the Oregon Legislature in 2021.

== History ==
In 1920, the Society of Oregon Composers held a competition to select a state song for Oregon. The winning entry, "Oregon, My Oregon," was a collaboration between John Andrew Buchanan, who wrote the lyrics, and Henry Bernard Murtagh, who composed the music. Buchanan was an amateur lyricist who was an Astoria city judge, while Murtagh was a professional musician with a Broadway credit, but who was best known as a professionally trained theatre organist on the West Coast during the silent movie era.

Following the song's selection, the Society promoted the song by conducting performances at public gathering spaces around the state and at schools and universities (the state Superintendent of Public Instruction had endorsed the song).

On February 12, 1927, the song was officially adopted as the state song by a joint resolution of the Oregon State Legislature.

In 2009, legislator Gene Whisnant proposed choosing a new official state song. In 2017, a bill proposed in the Oregon Legislative Assembly sought to update the song's lyrics, "to reflect cultural, historical, economic and societal evolution" of the state.

== Description ==
Buchanan's lyrics contain two main themes: honoring the early settlers and pioneers of Oregon, and praise for the natural beauty of the state. Murtagh composed the song as a march in F major. Unlike two other similarly named state songs—"Maryland, My Maryland" and "Michigan, My Michigan"—"Oregon, My Oregon" is not set to the tune of "O Tannenbaum."

On June 6, 2021, the Oregon Legislature approved changes to the lyrics of Oregon's state song. Amy Donna Shapiro, an Oregonian, replaced "Land of the Empire Builders, Land of the Golden West; Conquered and held by free men, Fairest and the Best" in the first verse with "Land of Majestic Mountains, Land of the Great Northwest; Forests and rolling rivers, Grandest and the best", and "Blest by the blood of martyrs" in the second verse with "Blessed by the love of freedom".

=== Lyrics ===
Original	New (2021 – present)
Land of the Empire Builders, Land of the Golden West; Conquered and held by free men, Fairest and the Best Onward and upward ever, Forward and on, and on; 𝄆 Hail to thee, Land of Heroes, My Oregon. 𝄇 Land of the rose and sunshine Land of the summer's breeze; Laden with health and vigor, Fresh from the Western seas. Blessed by the blood of martyrs, Land of the setting sun; 𝄆 Hail to thee, Land of Promise, My Oregon. 𝄇	Land of Majestic Mountains, Land of the Great Northwest; Forests and rolling rivers, Grandest and the best Onward and upward ever, Forward and on, and on; 𝄆 Hail to thee, Land of Heroes, My Oregon. 𝄇 Land of the rose and sunshine Land of the summer's breeze; Laden with health and vigor, Fresh from the Western seas. Blessed by the love of freedom, Land of the setting sun; 𝄆 Hail to thee, Land of Promise, My Oregon. 𝄇
