= Bertha Raffetto =

American songwriter (1885–1952)

Bertha Eaton Raffetto (March 15, 1885 – September 6, 1952) was an American teacher and civic worker, best known composing the song "Home Means Nevada", which was adopted as the official state song for Nevada in 1932.

== Biography ==
Bertha Eaton was born in Bloomfield, Iowa, March 15, 1885. She was the eldest daughter of Enoch Henry and Susan Frances Walker Eaton. She settled in Reno, Nevada after she became sick while on a train bound for California.

In the 1910s, Raffetto was married to Henry Clyde Hough, brother to writer Emerson Hough, as well as John William Frederick Myers from Utah, both of whom she later divorced. She married her third husband, Reno divorce attorney, Fiore Raffetto in 1922.

During the 1930s, Raffetto had a poetry column in the Nevada State Journal that was a popular feature. During the summer of 1932, the Nevada Native Daughters invited her, as a soprano, to sing a Nevada song of her choice at their annual picnic in August of that year. She recalled that years earlier she had attempted to write a song about Nevada, but had set it aside. Raffetto assembled her earlier notes and reworked the song the day before she was to give her performance. The following afternoon she sang her song "Home Means Nevada" from her hand written script. In the audience was former Nevada governor Roswell K. Colcord who told her afterwards, "Honey, that's the prettiest Nevada song that I have ever heard. It should be made the State Song of Nevada!". She was a 25-year-member of the Reno branch of the National League of American Pen Women and was the poet laureate of the Nevada Federation of Women's Club. She died in Reno, aged 77.
