= Michigan, My Michigan =

Popular unofficial anthem

"Michigan, My Michigan" is a popular anthem in the State of Michigan. The actual state song, "My Michigan", was formally adopted in 1937 but remains relatively obscure, partially because of the misconception that the official song is "Michigan, My Michigan". A 2003 bill to make the song an official state song failed to pass.

== History ==
Winifred Lee Brent Lyster of Detroit wrote the original 1862 lyrics of "Michigan, My Michigan" to the tune of "O Tannenbaum" (known in English as "O Christmas Tree"), and which was also the melody of "Maryland, My Maryland", a former state song of the state of Maryland. Her husband, Henry, was a physician who rose to be Medical Inspector and Acting Medical Director of III Corps in the Union Army. He served from the First Battle of Bull Run to the Battle of Appomattox Court House. Mrs. Lyster was inspired to write the song after the Battle of Fredericksburg.

Major James W. Long of Grand Rapids wrote new lyrics in 1886 but kept the original tune and original Civil War sentiment. In 1902, Douglas Malloch wrote the current lyrics for a convention of the Michigan State Federation of Woman's Clubs in Muskegon. He deemed them more suitable for a peacetime anthem. A new tune was also composed for the song by composer W. Otto Miessner of Detroit.

== 1862 lyrics ==
Home of my heart, I sing of thee!
Michigan, My Michigan,
Thy lake-bound shores I long to see,
Michigan, my Michigan.
From Saginaw’s tall whispering pines
To Lake Superior’s farthest mines,
Fair in the light of memory shines
Michigan, my Michigan.

Thou gav’st thy sons without a sigh,
Michigan, my Michigan,
And sent thy bravest forth to die,
Michigan, my Michigan.
Beneath a hostile southern sky
They bore thy banner proud and high,
Ready to fight but never fly,
Michigan, my Michigan.

From Yorktown on to Richmond’s wall,
Michigan, my Michigan,
They bravely fight, as bravely fall,
Michigan, my Michigan.
To Williamsburgh we point with pride—
Our Fifth and Second, side by side,
There stemmed and stayed the battle’s tide,
Michigan, my Michigan.

When worn with watching traitor foes,
Michigan, my Michigan,
The welcome night brought sweet repose,
Michigan, my Michigan.
The soldier, weary from the fight,
Sleeps sound, nor fears the rebels’ might,
For "Michigan’s on guard tonight!"
Michigan, my Michigan.

Afar on Shiloh’s fatal plain,
Michigan, my Michigan,
Again behold thy heroes slain,
Michigan, my Michigan.
"Their strong arms crumble in the dust,
And their bright swords have gathered rust;
Their memory is our sacred trust,"
Michigan, my Michigan.

And often in the coming years,
Michigan, my Michigan,
Some widowed mother ‘ll dry her tears,
Michigan, my Michigan,
And turning with a thrill of pride,
Say to the children at her side,
At Antietam your father died,
For Michigan, our Michigan.

With General Grant’s victorious name,
Michigan, my Michigan,
Thy sons still onward march to fame,
Michigan, my Michigan.
And foremost in the fight we see,
Where e’er the bravest dare to be,
The sabres of thy cavalry,
Michigan, my Michigan.

Dark rolled the Rappahannock’s flood,
Michigan, my Michigan,
The tide was crimsoned with thy blood,
Michigan, my Michigan.
Although for us the clay was lost,
Still it shall be our broadest boast:
At Fredericksburg our Seventh crossed!
Michigan, my Michigan.

And when the happy time shall come,
Michigan, my Michigan,
That brings thy war-worn heroes home,
Michigan, my Michigan,
What welcome from their own proud shore,
What honors at their feet we’ll pour,
What tears for those who’ll come no more,
Michigan, my Michigan.

A grateful country claims them now,
Michigan, my Michigan,
And deathless laurel binds each brow,
Michigan, my Michigan;
And history the tale will tell,
Of how they fought and how they fell,
For that dear land they loved so well,
Michigan, my Michigan.

== 1886 lyrics ==
Land of my love, I sing of thee,
Michigan, my Michigan;
With lake-bound shore, I'm proud of thee,
Michigan, my Michigan.
The sweet winds whisper through thy pines,
The jewels glitter in thy mines,
And glory on thy chaplet shines—
Michigan, my Michigan.

I've traveled all thy confines o'er,
Michigan, my Michigan;
From lake to lake, and shore to shore,
Michigan, my Michigan.
I've seen thy maimed, thy halt, thy blind,
I’ve seen the ones bereft of mind,
To all of them thou art so kind—
Michigan, my Michigan.

Thou art so pure, but modest, too,
Michigan, my Michigan;
Thou art so brave and still so true,
Michigan, my Michigan.
No promise unfulfilled;—on trust
Thy noble sons have bit the dust,
Remembered are they. For thou art just—
Michigan, my Michigan.

The axe resounds 'mid woodland trees,
Michigan, my Michigan;
The sails of commerce court thy breeze,
Michigan, my Michigan.
And templed cities rise in sight,
And happy eyes catch heaven's light,
Our God protects thee through the night,
Michigan, my Michigan.

Oh! Alma Mater, at thy shrine,
Michigan, my Michigan;
I worship thee as most divine,
Michigan, my Michigan,
"Tuebor" "I’ll protect," 'tis true—
Oh, fair peninsula! and you—
Shine out a gem in starry blue,
Michigan, my Michigan,

Thy diadem—thy hero sons,
Michigan, my Michigan;
Thy choicest love—their helpless ones,
Michigan, my Michigan.
And just as long as song shall ring
From those who bring an offering,
To thee, my love, this song shall sing—
Michigan, my Michigan.

== 1902 lyrics ==
A song to you, fair State of mine,
Michigan, my Michigan.
But greater song than this is thine,
Michigan, my Michigan.
The whisper of the forest tree,
The thunder of the inland sea,
Unite in one grand symphony
Of Michigan, my Michigan.

I sing a State of all the best—
Michigan, my Michigan.
I sing a State with riches blessed—
Michigan, my Michigan.
Thy mines unmask a hidden store,
But richer thy historic lore,
More great the love thy builders bore,
Oh, Michigan, my Michigan.

How fair the bosom of thy lakes,
Michigan, my Michigan.
What melody each river makes,
Michigan, my Michigan.
As to thy lakes, the rivers tend,
Thine exiled children to thee send
Devotion that shall never end,
Oh, Michigan, my Michigan.

Rich in the wealth that makes a State,
Michigan, my Michigan.
Great in the things that make men great,
Michigan, my Michigan.
Our loyal voices sound thy claim
Upon the golden roll of fame;
Our loyal hands shall write the name
Oh Michigan, my Michigan,Michigan,Michigan
,Michigan,Michigan.
