= Douglas Malloch =

American poet

- Born: May 5, 1877
- Died: July 2, 1938 (aged 61)

Douglas Malloch (May 5, 1877 – July 2, 1938) was an American poet, short-story writer and Associate Editor of American Lumberman, a trade paper in Chicago. He was known as a "Lumberman's poet" both locally and nationally. He is noted for writing Round River Drive and "Be the Best of Whatever You Are" in addition to many other creations. He was commissioned to write new lyrics for the Michigan State Song, Michigan, My Michigan in 1902.

== Life and work ==
Brother Malloch, as he was called, was born in Muskegon, Michigan which was known as a center of the lumbering industry. He grew up amidst the forest, logging camps, sawmills and lumber yards. He became famous among the people of twentieth century involved in the lumbering industry. He married Helen Miller, a day trader who was founder of the National Federation of Press Women.

Poems

- "A Man"
- "Ain't It Fine Today?"
- "Always A Mason"
- "Be the Best of Whatever You Are" (also cited as "If")
- "Building"
- "Chaudière"
- "Christmas"
- "Connecticut Drive"
- "Echoes"
- "Father's Lodge"
- "Good Timber"
- "The Little Lodge Of Long Ago"
- "The Love of a Botanist"
- "Make Me Mellow"
- "The Masonry Of Spring"
- "Undergrowth"
- "Members Or Masons"
- " Michigan my Michigan"
- "Old Town Road"
- "The Road of Masonry"
- "To-day" (also cited as
- "You have to believe in happiness"
- "The Love of a Man for a Man"
- "In forest land"
- "The Woods"
- "Tote-Road and Trail: Ballads of the Lumberjack"
- "Someone to care"
- "The heart content"
- "The Round River Drive"
- "Live life today"
- "Be the best"
- "Oh Weep No Weeps"
- "Christmas in Heaven"
- "Come On Home"
- "Come Home"
- "The Wood Cutter"
- "Constancy"
- "The Chickamauga Oak"
