= Home Means Nevada =

Song

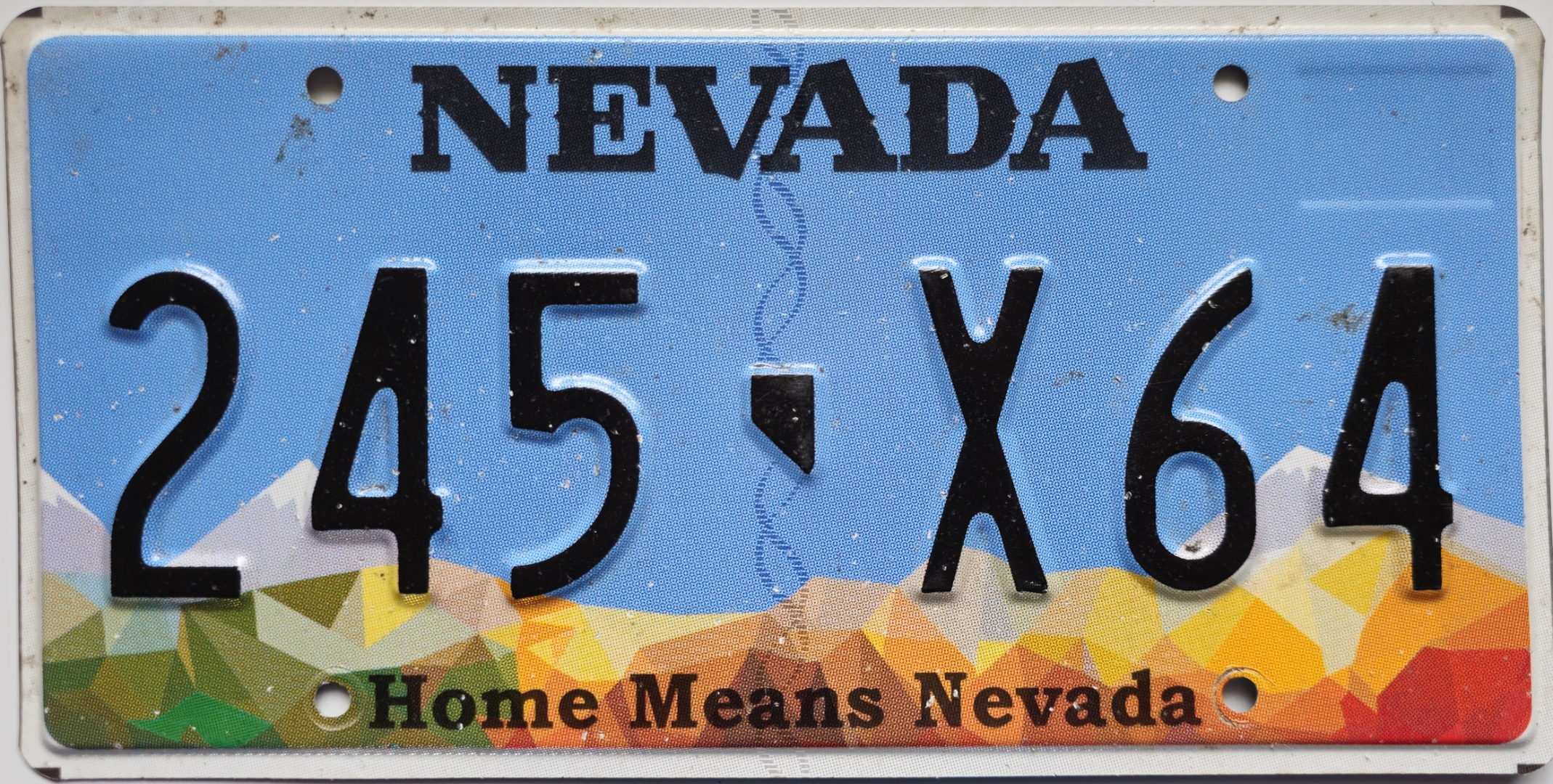
- A "Home Means Nevada" license plate, the standard since 2016.
- State anthem of Nevada
- Lyrics: Bertha Raffetto, 1932; 94 years ago
- Adopted: 1933

"Home Means Nevada" is the state anthem of the U.S. state of Nevada. It was written by Bertha Raffetto in 1932 and officially adopted by the Nevada Legislature in 1933 as the official state song.

It has been Nevada's license plate slogan since 2016.

== Lyrics ==
Way out in the land of the setting sun,
Where the wind blows wild and free,
There's a lovely spot, just the only one
That means home sweet home to me.
If you follow the old Kit Carson trail,
Until desert meets the hills,
Oh you certainly will agree with me,
It's the land of a thousand thrills.

Chorus:
Home means Nevada,
Home means the hills,
Home means the sage and the pines.
Out by the Truckee's silvery rills,
Out where the sun always shines,
There is the land that I love the best,
Fairer than all I can see.
Right in the heart of the golden west
Home, means Nevada to me.

Whenever the sun at the close of day,
Colors all the western sky,
Oh my heart returns to the desert grey
And the mountains tow'ring high.
Where the moon beams play in shadowed glen,
With the spotted fawn and doe,
All the live long night until morning light,
Is the loveliest place I know.

Chorus

Right in the heart of the golden west
Home, means Nevada to me.

== Notable performances ==
- Former Governor of Nevada Brian Sandoval and his staff performed the song twice, in 2011 and 2012.
- April Meservy released this song as a single in 2016 and later in 2017.
- Rick Pickren released this song as a part of his 2012 album The State Songs Volume Three.
- The Killers performed a cover of the song for a rally for Senator Harry Reid, the recording of which is used in the KXTE syndicated show Dave and Mahoney, to end every episode, and as well as the final sign off of KDWN in 2023.
