= Gi Talo Gi Halom Tasi =

Regional anthem of the Northern Mariana Islands

English: In the Middle of the Sea
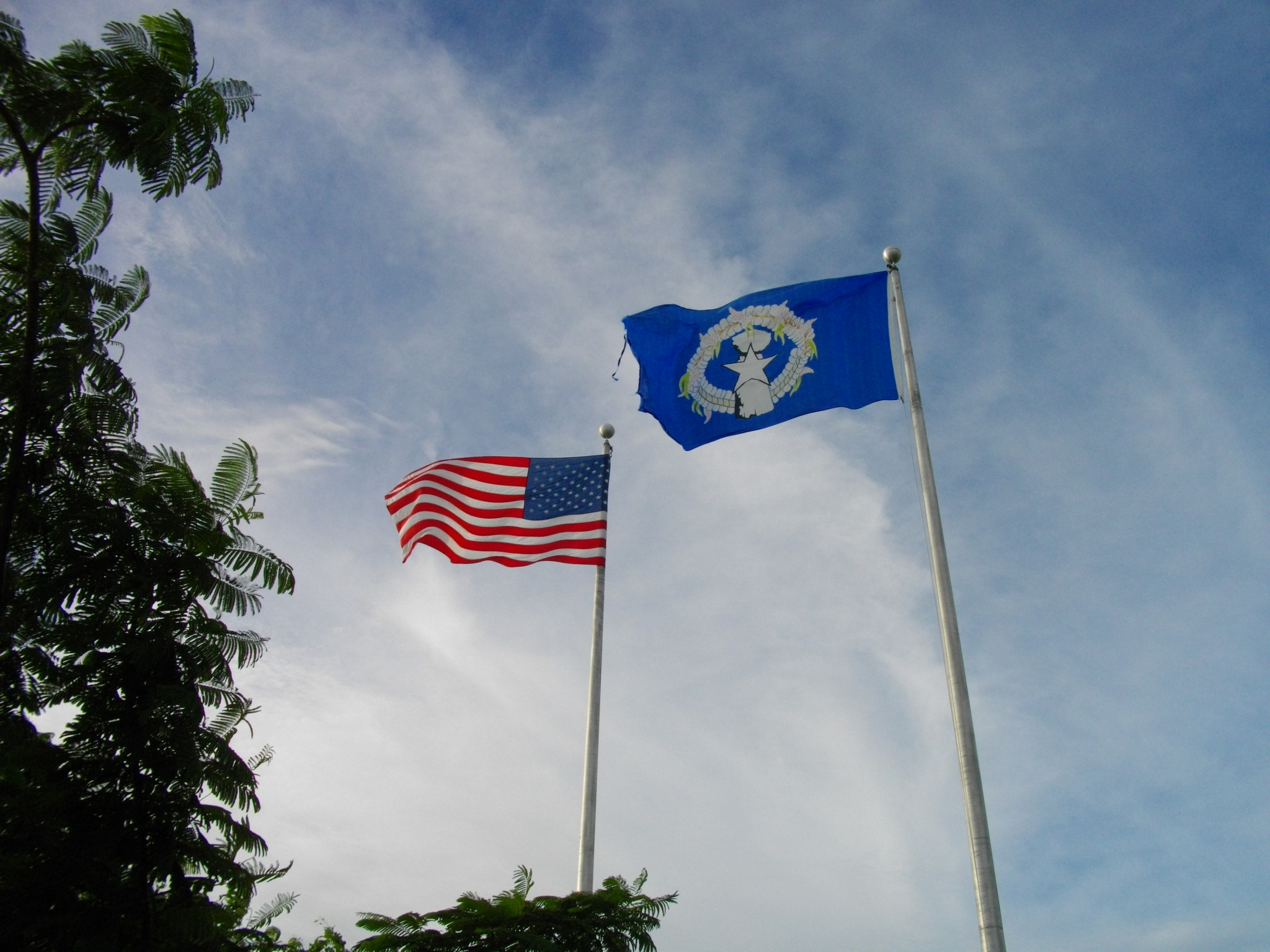
- Regional anthem of the Northern Mariana Islands
- Also known as: Satil matawal Pacifico
- Lyrics: David Kapileo Taulamwaar Peter, 1976 (Chamorro lyrics: Jose and Joaqin Pangelinan, 1940s)
- Music: German folk tune
- Adopted: 1996; 30 years ago

Audio sample
- U.S. Navy Band instrumental version (one verse and chorus): file; help

"Gi Talo Gi Halom Tasi" (Chamorro pronunciation: [gi tæloʔ gi hɑlum tɑsi]; English: "In the Middle of the Sea"), also known as "Satil matawal Pacifico" (Carolinian pronunciation: [sætil mɐtɐwɐl pɐsifiku]), is the regional anthem of the Northern Mariana Islands, a commonwealth of the United States.

== History ==
The Chamorro lyrics for the official commonwealth anthem of the Commonwealth of the Northern Mariana Islands (CNMI) were jointly written by brothers Jose and Joaquin Pangelinan, presumably around the time after the Second World War had ended. The Carolinian lyrics for the CNMI's commonwealth anthem were written by David Kapileo Peter "Taulamwaar" the day before the signing of the Covenant in 1976. David Marciano assisted with parts of the Carolinian version of the lyrics, and his contributions were incorporated before being sang for the first time on the day that the Covenant with the United States of America was signed. Vicente "Kilili" Sablan Sr., former mayor of the Northern Mariana Islands capital, Saipan, assisted by translating the lyrics into English and Japanese. The Rematau band was the first group to sing and record the "Commonwealth National Anthem".

During the First Constitutional Convention, a resolution was introduced to compel the new government to proclaim the song as the official anthem of the soon-to-be-created Commonwealth of the Northern Mariana Islands. In 1996, it became the official commonwealth anthem by virtue of Public Law 10-28, authored in the Tenth CNMI Legislature and signed by then Governor Froilan Cruz Tenorio into law. Both versions of the commonwealth anthem are taught to students as well as displayed prominently in official programs and posters, as both versions make up the one commonwealth anthem – not one or the other. The melody of the song is taken from the 19th-century German tune "Im schönsten Wiesengrunde" (with lyrics written by Wilhelm Ganzhorn in 1851), which in turn is based on the older folk tune "Drei Lilien, drei Lilien". Coincidentally, the national anthem of the neighboring Federated States of Micronesia is derived from a 19th-century German song.

Since the islands are a U.S. dependency, the national anthem is still the U.S. one, "The Star-Spangled Banner", and the anthem is played after "The Star-Spangled Banner" in the raising of the commonwealth flag.

== Lyrics ==
Chamorro lyrics	Chamorro IPA transcription as sung (Note: See Help:IPA, Chamorro language § Phonology and Chamorro language § Orthography.)
I Gi talo' gi halom tåsi (Note: Talo' gi has sometimes been written without a space or apostrophe.); Nai gaigi tano' hu (Note: Usually written Nai gaigi tano' ho. Has also been written Nai gaige i tano'-hu.); Ayo nai siempre hu såga (Note: Has also been written Ayu nai siempre u saga.); Malago' hu. (Note: Usually written malago' ho. Has also been written malago'ho or malago'-hu.) Ya un dia bai u hånao (Note: Originally written Ya un dia baihu hanao. Has also been written Ya un diha bai hu hånao.); Bai fåttu ha' ta'lu (Note: Originally written Bai fatto ha' ta'lo. Has also been written Bai fatto ha'ta'lo and Bai fåtto ha' ta'lo.); Ti siña håo hu dingu (Note: Usually written Tisiña hao hu dingo, occasionally with "n" in place of "ñ".); O tano' hu. (Note: Usually written O tano' ho. Has also been written O tano'ho and O tano'-hu.) Chorus I: 𝄆 Mit beses yan mås Hu saluda hao Gåtbo na islas Mariånas (Note: Has also been written Gåtbo na islas Mari'ånas.); Hu tuna hao 𝄇	1 [gi tæ.lo(ʔ) gi‿(h)ɑ.lum tɑ.si] [næ(.)i gæ(.)i.gi tæ.no(ʔ) hu] [æ.d̪͡z̪o næ(.)i s(j)ɛm.pre(‿)(h)u sɑ.gæ] [mæ.læ.go(ʔ).hu] [d̪͡z̪æ un di.æ bæ(.)i hu hɑ.nɑo̯] [bæ(.)i fɑt.tu hæ(ʔ) tæ(ʔ).lu] [ti si.ɲæ hɑo̯ (h)u di.ŋu] [o tæ.no(ʔ) hu] 𝄆 [mid‿be.sez‿d̪͡z̪æn mɑs] [hu sæ.lu.dæ hɑo̯] [gɑd.bo næ iz.læs mæ.ri(.)ɑ.næs] [hu tu.næ hɑo̯] 𝄇
Carolinian (Refalawasch) lyrics	Carolinian IPA transcription as sung (Note: See Help:IPA, Carolinian language § Phonology and Carolinian language § Alphabet.)
2 Satil matawal Pacifico (Note: Has also been written Satil matawal Pasifiku.); Igha elo falawééy iye (Note: Falawééy is usually written faluwééy.); Ighilal igha ebwe lootiw (Note: Has also been written Ighilal igha ebwe lottiw.); Tipééy iye. Eew ráál nge ibwe mwetesangi (Note: Originally written Eew rual nge ibwe mwetesangi. Has also been written Eew raal nge ibwe mwetsangi.); Nge ibwal sefáálitiiy (Note: Has also been written Nge ibwal sefaliti.); Ese mmwel bwe ibwe lighiti (Note: Has also been written Ese mmwal bwe ibwe lighiti.); Bwe falawééy. (Note: Sometimes written Bwe faluwééy.) Chorus II: 𝄆 Sangaras faal bwughuwal (Note: Usually written Sangaras fa bwughuwal. Has also been written Sangaras faal bwughuwasch.); Ay tirow ngalugh Ling ghatchul téél falúw Mariånas (Note: Originally written Ling ghatchul teel faliui Marianas. Usually written Ling ghatchul téél falúw Marianas. Has also been written Lling ghatchul teel falu Mari'ånas.); Ay Mwareiti 𝄇	2 [sæ.til mɐ.tɐ.wɐl pɐ.si.fi.ku] [(i.)xɐ‿e.lo fɐ.lɐ.weː(j) i.je] [i.xi.lɐl (i.)xɐ e.bʷˠe lo(ː)(t).tiw] [ti.peː(j) i.je] [eːw ræːl ŋe i.bʷˠe mʷˠet(e).sæ.ŋi] [ŋe(‿)i.bʷˠɐl se.fæː.li.tiː(j)] [e.se mʷˠːel bʷˠe i.bʷˠe li.xi.ti] [bʷˠe fɐ.lɐ.weː(j)] 𝄆 [sɐŋ(ɐ).rɐs fɐ(l) bʷˠu.xu.wɐl] [æj ti.row ŋæ.lʉ(w)x] [liŋ xɐ.ʈ͡ʂːʲʉ(w)l teːl fɐ.lʉw mɐ.rjɒ.nɐs] [ɐj mʷˠɐ.re(i̯).ti] 𝄇
English translation of Chamorro lyrics
In the middle of the sea Is where my home is That is where I will spend my days It is my desire. If I ever leave this place One day I will return For I can never leave you O land of mine. Chorus: 𝄆 A thousand times and more I will honor and salute you Beautiful islands of the Marianas; Glory be to you 𝄇
