= Virgin Islands March =

Regional anthem of the United States Virgin Islands

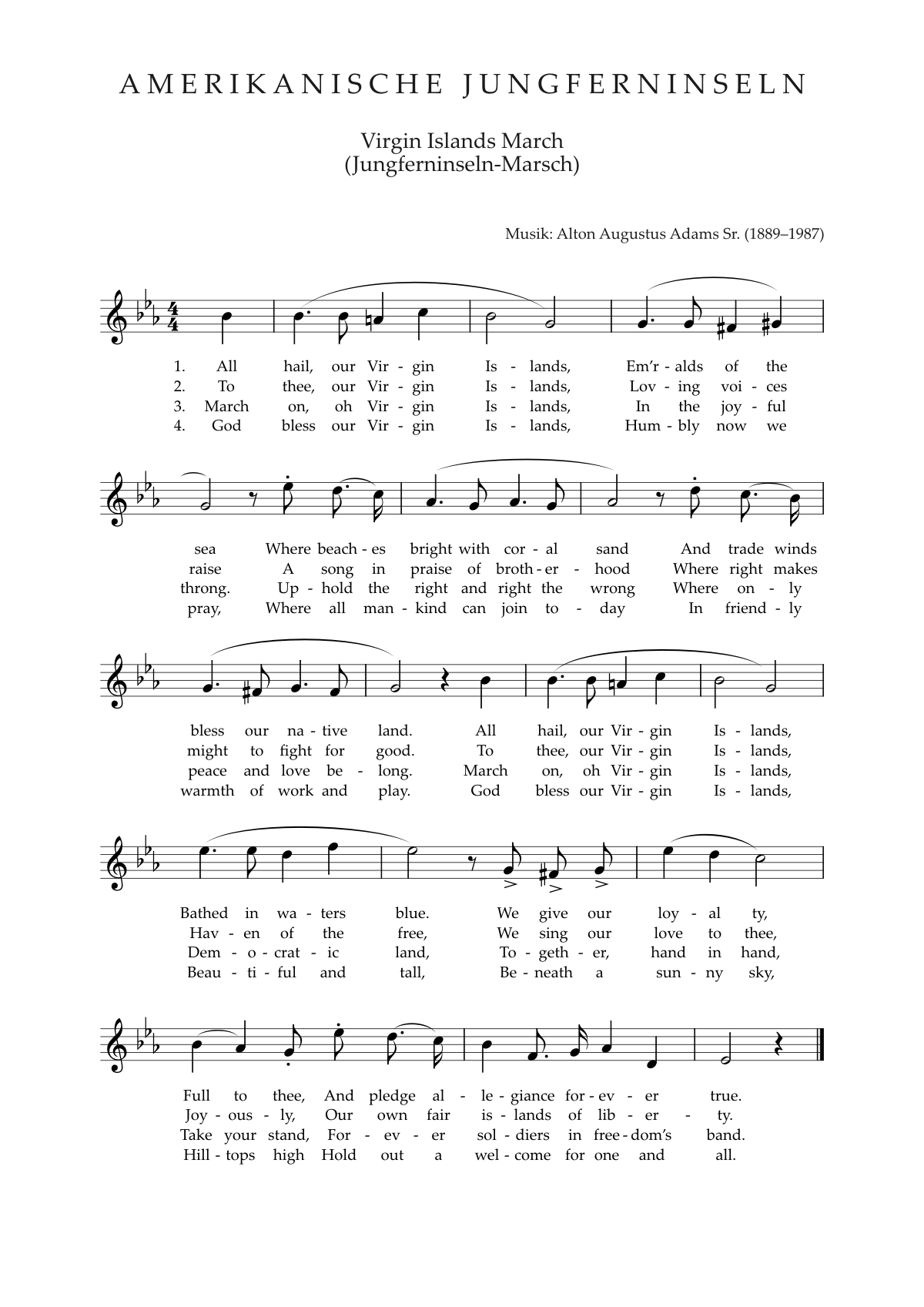
- Regional anthem of the United States Virgin Islands
- Lyrics: Collectively
- Music: Sam Williams and Alton Adams, 1920s
- Adopted: 1963; 63 years ago

Audio sample
- Instrumental version (Two verses): file; help

U.S. Virgin Islands Air National Guard instrumental version (no intro)

The "Virgin Islands March" is the regional anthem of the United States Virgin Islands. The song was composed by Sam Williams and bandmaster and U.S. Virgin Island native Alton Adams in the 1920s. It served as an unofficial regional anthem of the U.S. Virgin Islands until 1963, when it was officially recognized by Legislative Act.

The song itself is a brisk martial march, consisting of an introductory instrumental section followed by a very cheerful melody. The Guardian reporter Alex Marshall compared it favorably to some national anthems, suggesting that it was reminiscent of the music of the Disney film Mary Poppins.

Since the U.S. Virgin Islands is a U.S. insular territory, the national anthem is still the U.S. one, "The Star-Spangled Banner". During international sporting events, only the "Virgin Islands March" is played.

== Lyrics ==
On most occasions, the first verse followed by the last verse is sung.

I
All hail our Virgin Islands.
Em'ralds of the sea,
Where beaches bright with coral sand
And trade winds bless our native land.
All hail our Virgin Islands,
Bathed in waters blue,
We give our loyalty,
Full to thee,
And pledge allegiance forever true.

II
To thee our Virgin Islands,
Loving voices raise
A song in praise of brotherhood,
Where right makes might to fight for good.
To thee our Virgin Islands,
Haven of the free,
We sing our love to thee,
Joyously,
Our own fair islands of liberty.

III
March on oh Virgin Islands,
In the joyful throng,
Uphold the right and right the wrong
Where only peace and love belong.
March on oh Virgin Islands,
Democratic land.
Together hand in hand,
Take your stand,
Forever soldiers in freedom's band.

IV
God bless our Virgin Islands,
Humbly now we pray,
Where all mankind can join today
In friendly warmth of work and play.
God bless our Virgin Islands,
Beautiful and tall.
Beneath a sunny sky,
Hilltops high
Hold out a welcome for one and all.
