= O Fair New Mexico =

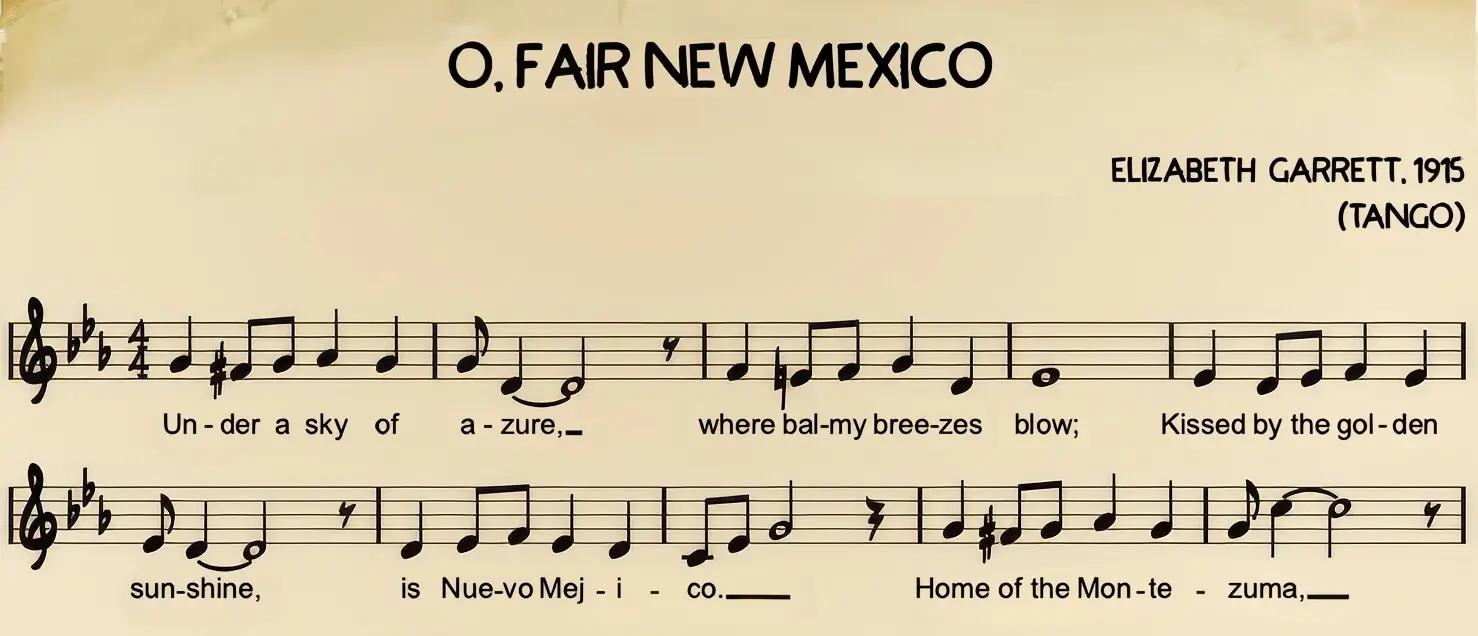
- O Fair New Mexico sheet music (1915)

Song by Elizabeth Garrett
- Recorded: 1924
- Studio: Marsh Laboratories
- Genre: Tango
- Label: Autograph Records
- Songwriter: Elizabeth Garrett
- Composer: Elizabeth Garrett
- Lyricist: Elizabeth Garrett

Audio sample
- O Fair New Mexico, recorded by Elizabeth Garrett in 1924. First recording of New Mexico state song in history.: file; help

"O Fair New Mexico" is the regional anthem of the U.S. state of New Mexico. It was officially adopted as the state song by an act of the New Mexico legislature, approved on March 14, 1917, as signed by New Mexican governor Washington E. Lindsey.

== History ==
"O Fair New Mexico" was composed by Elizabeth Garrett, the daughter of former Lincoln County Sheriff Pat Garrett, best known for killing the infamous outlaw Billy the Kid. It was copyrighted in 1915 as a guardia vieja-era tango. On March 14, 1917, the New Mexico legislature and then governor Washington E. Lindsey adopted the composition as the official state song of New Mexico.

In 1924, Elizabeth Garrett made a recording of the song at Marsh Laboratories in Chicago, released on Marsh's Autograph Records label. In 1928, military conductor John Philip Sousa presented New Mexico governor Governor Arthur T. Hannett with a version of the song arranged as a march.

Contemporary versions of the state song have been arranged with more of a New Mexico music style.

== Lyrics ==
The following are the lyrics for "O Fair New Mexico":

First verse
Under a sky of azure, where balmy breezes blow,
Kissed by the golden sunshine, is Nuevo México.
Home of the Montezuma, with fiery hearts aglow, *
State of the deeds historic, is Nuevo México.

Chorus
O fair New Mexico, we love, we love you so
Our hearts with pride will o'erflow, no matter where we go,
O fair New Mexico, we love, we love you so,
The grandest state to know, New Mexico.

Second verse
Rugged and high sierras, with deep canyons below;
Dotted with fertile valleys, is Nuevo México.
Fields full of sweet alfalfa, richest perfumes bestow,
State of the apple blossoms, is Nuevo México.

Chorus
O fair New Mexico, we love, we love you so
Our hearts with pride will o'erflow, no matter where we go,
O fair New Mexico, we love, we love you so,
The grandest state to know, New Mexico.

Third verse
Days that are full of heart-dreams, nights when the moon hangs low;
Beaming its benediction, o'er Nuevo México.
Land with its bright mañana, coming through weal and woe;
State of our esperanza, is Nuevo México.

Chorus
O fair New Mexico, we love, we love you so
Our hearts with pride will o'erflow, no matter where we go,
O fair New Mexico, we love, we love you so,
The grandest state to know, New Mexico.

Finale
New Mexico! New Mexico! New Mexico!
¡Que viva!

* A reference to the red breasted Montezuma Quail which is a bird that is native to New Mexico.

== See also ==
- "Así Es Nuevo México", the Spanish state song
