= Elizabeth Garrett (songwriter) =

American songwriter (1885–1947)

Elizabeth Gutierrez Garrett
- Born: October 9, 1885; Alto, New Mexico, U.S.
- Died: October 16, 1947 (aged 62) Roswell, New Mexico, U.S.

Elizabeth Garrett (October 9, 1885 – October 16, 1947) was a musician and songwriter who composed New Mexico's official state song, "O Fair New Mexico".

== Biography ==
Garrett's father, Pat Garrett, was a Western lawman best known for killing Billy the Kid near Fort Sumner, New Mexico in 1881. Her mother was Apolinaria Gutierrez. Shortly after birth, Elizabeth was discovered to be blind, likely after suffering an infection of the eyes. U.S. Vice President John Nance Garner, a family acquaintance, commented that Pat Garrett gave his daughter "everything to make her happy and I think finally made quite a musician of her." In 1892, Elizabeth was enrolled in a school for the blind in Austin, Texas, where she studied piano, organ, and voice. She graduated in 1904 and then received further musical training in New York and Chicago.

From 1907 to 1915, Garrett taught at the New Mexico Institute for the Blind in Alamogordo. She gave small concerts around the United States and was promoted as the "Songbird of the Southwest."

In 1915, three years after New Mexico was admitted to the U.S. as the 47th state, Garrett wrote O Fair New Mexico. Written in the form of a tango, the legislature officially adopted it as New Mexico's state song in 1917. John Philip Sousa made an arrangement of it in 1928.

Garrett moved to Roswell, New Mexico, in 1920 and taught piano in addition to writing song lyrics and music. Later in life, she developed a friendship with the blind author and political activist Helen Keller. She died on October 16, 1947, after a fall on a city street in Roswell.
