= Houston Davis =

American drummer (1914–1987)

- Born: William Houston Davis; December 15, 1914; Tahlequah, Oklahoma
- Died: November 15, 1987 (aged 72) Jackson, Mississippi
- Genres: Big band jazz; popular music
- Occupations: Composer, arranger, music educator, drummer
- Instrument: Drums
- Years active: 1935–1962

Houston Davis (born William Houston Davis; December 15, 1914 – November 15, 1987) was an American composer, arranger, teacher of music, dance band drummer, and later in his career, a justice of the peace in Hinds County, Mississippi.

== Career ==
=== Growing up and early career ===
As a child, Davis was born and raised in Tahlequah, Oklahoma. His father, Edward Samuel Davis (1874–1952) was a barber. Davis played snare drum in a community marching band in Tahlequah, Oklahoma. His father played bass horn. Davis went on to study music at Northeastern State University in Tahlequah, Oklahoma (his photo is in the university's 1935 yearbook). During college, Davis also led his own dance band. Northeastern's music faculty included Henri S. Minsky (1908–1980), a violinist who was director of bands.

Around 1936, Davis began playing drums with the Wally Stoefler Orchestra, and stayed with the group until about 1940. Stoefler's press releases often singled out Davis as "that famous Oklahoma drummer." At some point in his career, he then taught high school music and band.

Davis moved to Mississippi in 1942. In the latter 1950s, he wrote a number of political songs, but, was mostly composer and arranger for hire, as was advertised in a brochure published around 1960:

Houston Davis: successful composer of political songs, jingles, parodies.

— Houston Davis brochure

=== Songwriting career ===
Davis wrote campaign songs for Mississippi Governors Ross Barnett and Paul Johnson. He composed "Go, Mississippi", which, in 1962, became the official state song for Mississippi. He also composed country songs, such as "I'm Broke", "Girls Don't Wear Dresses Anymore", and "Crop Duster".

=== Non-music career ===
- In 1972, Davis was elected justice of the peace in Hinds County, Mississippi.
- Davis ran as an independent for mayor of Jackson, losing to Russell Carlos Davis (1922–1993), a Democrat, in the June 5, 1973, general election. Russell Davis was mayor of Jackson from 1969 to 1977.
- He wrote fiction for a national magazine.

== National recognition ==
- July 15, 1933: Ripley's Believe It or Not!, Davis received recognition for having held a drum roll in 1938 for 6 hours, 30 minutes, 20 seconds. The former record had been set by a member of Sousa's band.
- Davis was admitted to ASCAP in 1965.

== Selected works ==
Sheet music

- "Caracas"

R.S. Ricketts (words)
William Houston Davis (music)
© Ruby Stroud Ricketts, Mount Olive, Miss.
15 June 1947; EU80333
(unpublished)

- "Got a Rock In My Shoe"

R.S. Ricketts (words)
William Houston Davis (music)
© Ruby Stroud Ricketts, Mount Olive, Miss.
15 June 1947; EU80332
(unpublished)

- "I Wonder How Much You Love Me"

R.S. Ricketts (words)
William Houston Davis (music)
© Ruby Stroud Ricketts, Mount Olive, Miss.
26 June 1947; EU81765
(unpublished)

- "Put On The Coffee, Sarah"

R.S. Ricketts (words)
William Houston Davis (music)
© Ruby Stroud Ricketts, Mount Olive, Miss.
15 January 1947; EU80334
(unpublished)

- "There's A Star Shining Bright"

D. Bynum (words)
William Houston Davis (music)
© Dolly Bynum, Jackson, Miss.
23 March 1947; EU67985
(unpublished)

- "Yolanda and Joe"

R.S. Ricketts (words)
William Houston Davis (music)
© Ruby Stroud Ricketts, Mount Olive, Miss.
15 June 1947; EU80335
(unpublished)

- "Rose of My Heart"

James Vernal Fout & Houston Davis
Delta Records, Jackson, Mississippi
(custom recording)

- "I'm Sending You A Kiss On A Star"

R.S. Ricketts (words)
William Houston Davis (music)
© w&m Ruby Stroud Ricketts, Mount Olive, Miss.
October 1947; EU96063
(unpublished)

- "Think Of You"

William Houston Davis (arrangement)
© m Leon Daniel
10 September 1947; EUJ92147
(unpublished)

- "A Tootin' Tune From A Hootin' Distance"

William Houston Davis (music)
© w Elma Brown Monroe
28 September 1947; EU95446
(unpublished)

- "Heartbreak"

William Houston Davis (arrangement)
Sadie Nordin Sallis (w&m)
22 April 1949; EU164320
(unpublished)

- "I Do, I Do, I Do"

William Houston Davis (arrangement)
© w & m Sadie Nordin Sallis
25 March 1949; EUI61837
(unpublished)

- "Sand Castles"

William Houston Davis (arrangement)
© w & m Sadie Nordin Sallis
25 March 1949; EUI61836
(unpublished)

- "That Cozy Little Cabin"

William Houston Davis (arrangement)
© w & m Sadie Nordin Sallis
25 February 1949; EU158212
(unpublished)

- "When God Made You"

William Houston Davis (arrangement)
© w & m Sadie Nordin Sallis
21 April 1949; EU164819
(unpublished)

- You Can't Hold His Hand While You Still Hold My Heart"

William Houston Davis (arrangement)
© w & m Sadie Nordin Sallis
25 March 1949; EUI61838
(unpublished)

- "I Want To Write A Song For The Hit Parade"

William Houston Davis (music)
© w Ruby Stroud Ricketts
August 8, 1949; EU175503
(unpublished)

- "I'll Be Blue, When I Paint The Town Red"

Sadie Nordin Sallis (words)
William Houston Davis & Jerry Lane (music)
© Sadie Nordin Sallis & William Houston Davis
July 17, 1950; EU209639
(unpublished)

- "Gotta Go, Baby"

Diamond Record Co., employer for hire
of William Houston Davis
© Diamond Record Co.
January 7, 1952; EU260399
(unpublished)

- "Go, Mississippi"

In E♭ major
© Jackson Board of Realtors
September 17, 1962; EP167366
OCLC 20005003 (Note: Vol. 16, Part 5, No. 2, July–December 1962 (1963), pg. 1199, "MIS-SIS-SIP-PI," Houston Davis (w&m); © September 17, 1962, Jackson Board of Realtors; EP167366)

- "Go, Mississippi"

(manuscript)
Houston Davis (w&m)
© Jackson Board of Realtors
September 17, 1962; EP167366
OCLC 656249381

- "Roll With Ross, He's His Own Boss"

W. Houston Davis (w&m)
© Ross R. Barnett
February 27, 1959; EU564630
(unpublished)

- "Little Carrol's Last Stand"

Houston Davis (w&m)
© W.H. Davis
New matter: new words
August 12, 1959; EU589029
(unpublished)

- "All I Want Is A Few Kind Words"

Joseph Patrick Manley (words)
Houston Davis & Sammy Graham (music)
© Joseph Patrick Manley
29 March 1954; EU352629
(unpublished)

- "Baby Sitting"

Marion J. LoPresto, Sr. (1919–1981) (words)
Houston Davis (music)
© Marion J. LoPresto, Sr., & Houston Davis
23 Febreuar 1954; EU348672
(unpublished)

- Eatin' High On The Hog"

Ed Baker (words)
William Houston Davis & Sammy Graham (music)
© Ed Baker
23 February 1954; EU348497
(unpublished)

- "I Jes' Wanna Stay In Bed"

Joseph Patrick Manley (word)
Houston Davis & Sammy Graham (music)
© Joseph Patrick Manley
29 March 1954; EU352630
(unpublished)

- "I Worry"

Mrs. A. A. Kirkpatrick (words)
Houston Davis & Sammy Graham (music)
© Mrs. A. A. Kirkpatrick
24 May 1954; EU359031
(unpublished)

- "Share With Another"

Robert Tipp Deel (word)
Houston Davis & Sammy Graham (music)
© Robert Tipp Deel
27 May 1954; EU359600
(unpublished)

- "Wife And Mother-In-Law

Robert Tipp Deel (words)
Houston Davis & Sammy Graham (music)
© Robert Tipp Deel
27 May 1954; EU359601
(unpublished)

- "Asleep In Jesus"

Effie Price Garrett (words)
Sammy Graham & Houston Davis (music)
© Effie Price Garrett
8 November 1954l; EU376417
(unpublished)

- "Bells"

Mrs. A. A. Kirkpatrick (words)
Houston Davis & Sammy Graham (music)
© Mrs. A. A. Kirkpatrick
30 December 1954; EU381296
(unpublished)

- "Carren of Key West"

Arlie S. Davis (words)
Houston Davis & Sammy Graham (music)
© Arlie S. Davis
6 December 1954; EU379205
(unpublished)

- "Oh! I Wish I Was"

Mrs. A. A. Kirkpatrick (words)
Houston Davis & Sammy Graham (music)
© Mrs. A. A. KIrkpatrick
11 October 1954; EU375983
(unpublished)

- "How're You Feeling"

Tom L. Spengler (w&m)
William Houston Davis (arrangement)
© Fielding L. Wright
20 May 1955; EU398027
(unpublished)

- "Silver Moon Waltz"

Grace Irene Provins & Tex Stanley (words)
Houston Davis & Sammy Graham (music)
© Grace Irene Provins
25 May 1955; EU398839
(unpublished)

- "Southern Charm"

Carrie Goyette Murray (words)
Houston Davis & Sammy Graham (music)
© Carrie Goyette Murray
4 April 1955; EU392381
(unpublished)

- "I Missed You In My Dreams Last Night"

Robert Lane Almond (words)
Houston Davis & Sammy Graham (music)
© Robert Lane Almond
1 September 1955; EU408697
(unpublished)

- There Ain't Gonna Be No Mason–Dixon line No More"

Lola Davis Long (words)
Lola Davis Long, employer for hire of Houston Davis & Sammy Graham
© Lola Davis Long
2 November 1955; EU4l6388
(unpublished)

- "Big Bad Bee"

Hazel Christine Nordan (words)
Houston Davis (music)
© Hazel Christine Nordan
4 January 1956; EU421510
(unpublished)

- "One Of These Days"

Aline Marie Quarles (words)
William Houston Davis & Sammy Graham
© Aline Marie Quarles
26 October 1956; EU454674
(unpublished)

- "Add Another Heart To Your Collection"

Florence Mandel (words)
Houston Davis (music)
© Florence Mandel
20 November 1964; EU854383
(unpublished)

- "All Mississippi Is For Your, Barry"

Houston Davis (w&m)
© Houston Davis
6 October 1964; EU847101
(unpublished)

- "Blue Mood"

Grace Y. Ward (words)
Houston Davis (music)
2 p. © Grace Y. Ward
8 December 1964; EU857121
(unpublished)

- "Dirty Cotton Picking Machine"

Hilary Lewis (w&m)
Houston Davis (arrangement)
2 p. © Hilary C. Lewis
17 December 1964; EU858154
(unpublished)

- "HR7152"

Houston Davis,
Davis
13 July 1964; EU833962
(unpublished)
Note: H.R. 7152 is the Civil Rights Act of 1964

- "I Can Never Be Lonesome"

Gertrude Seaborn (words)
Houston Davis (music)
© Gertrude Seaborn
16 July 1964; EU834988
(unpublished)

- "I Love You"

Ernest C. Rowell (words)
Houston Davis (music)
2 p. © Ernest C. Rowell
13 August 1964; EU838949
(unpublished)

- "I Will Always Whooop It Up For Mississippi"

William D. Waugh (words)
Houston Davis (music)
© William D. Waugh & Houston Davis
13 July 1964; EU833961
(unpublished)

- "King Lyndon"

Houston Davis (w&m)
© Houston Davis
3 September 1964; EU842366
(unpublished)
Note: Reference to LBJ

- "My Little Ole Door"

J.L. Carter (words), pseudonym of Hilary C. Lewis
Houston Davis (music)
© Hilary C. Lewis
6 November 1964; EU852324
(unpublished)

- "1994"

Houston Davis (w&m)
© Houston Davis
28 July 1964; EU836465
(unpublished)

- "Sandy"

Fred Maass, Jr. (words)
Houston Davis Productions, Inc. (music)
© Fred Maass, Jr.
2 October 1964; EU846530
(unpublished)

- "The South Bend Polka"

Eve Rene Corle (words)
Houston Davis (music)
© Eve Rene Corle
28 September 1964; EU846081
(unpublished)

- "Springtime In Georgia"

John B. Skipper (words)
Houston Davis (music)
© John B. Skipper
13 November 1964; EU853297
(unpublished)

== Brief biographies of song collaborators ==
- Tom L. Spengler, Jr., in 1957, was manager of Godwin Adv. Agency, Jackson, Mississippi
- Sammy Graham led a band in Mississippi
- Diamond Record Co., Inc., was an affiliate of Trumpet Records. Diamond was formed as Diamond Record Co., Inc., in 1950 when a white woman named Lillian McMurry and her husband Willard purchased a hardware store on Farish Street in Jackson, MS., then a location on the boundary between the city's white and black business and entertainment districts.

Elmore James, Sonny Boy Williamson, Little Milton, and James Waller — all of these musical powerhouses furthered their recording careers at a little record company-label on once-thriving Farish Street, the historic black district of Jackson, Mississippi. These blues, gospel, and R&B all-stars are featured in Trumpet Records-Diamonds.

Disambiguation

- Not to be confused with the New York company, Diamond Records, owned in 1947 by Irving Gwirtz.
- Not to be confused with the New York company, Diamond Records, founded in 1961 by former Roulette Records executive Joe Kolsky.

== Selected discography ==
Delta Recording Corp. recorded the original version of "Go, Mississippi" at its studio in Jackson, Mississippi, at 1653 Raymond Road. The label, which had an office in New York City in the early 1950s at 236 West 55th Street (Midtown Manhattan), was founded by Jim Bulleit (né James Albert Bulleit; 1908–1988) and Jimmie Ammons (né James Douglas Ammons; 1919–2001). Ammons's main occupation was that of a machinist in Jackson, Mississippi. Delta was noted for its custom recording work, which included recording weddings, church choirs, and college choirs. Delta also produced recordings for the foreign language department of Ole Miss. Delta also produced many jingles for numerous radio stations. Delta recorded radio stations all over Mississippi for ASCAP. When Mississippi was searching for a state song, Delta Recording Studio reportedly recorded all the state university bands in search of the song that would truly be representative of the state.

Original recording

- Delta Records 133 (45 rpm) (released 1962)

Governor Ross R. Barnett Campaign Souvenir: 1959 Campaign Songs
Jerry Lane Orchestra, Maurice Thompson Singers ₳
Houston Davis Productions, Inc.
OCLC 874137334
133-657: Side 1

1. "Go, Mississippi" (© 1962)
  Jerry Lane Orchestra
  Houston Davis (w&m)
  OCLC 30057690

133-656: Side 2

2. "Roll With Ross" (© 1959) (Note: Vol. 13, Part 5, No. 1, January–June 1959 (1960), pg. 453, "Roll With Ross; He's His Own Boss," Houston Davis (w&m); © February 27, 1959, Ross R. Barnett; EU564630)
  (audio on YouTube)
  Houston Davis (w&m)
  Maurice Thompson Singers ₳
  Orchestra conducted by Jerry Lane ‡
  OCLC 874142886
3. "Little Carrol's Last Stand" (© 1959) (Note: Vol. 13, Part 5, No. 2, July–December 1959 (1960), pg. 1397, "Little Carrol's Last Stand," Houston Davis (w&m); © August 12, 1959, W.H. Davis; EU589029) †
  (audio on YouTube)
  Houston Davis (w&m)
  Maurice Thompson Singers ₳
  Orchestra conducted by Jerry Lane

† The copyright for "Little Carrol's Last Stand" was previously registered as "The Battle of New Orleans." "Little Carrol's Last Stand" was a political campaign attack song by commissioned by Ross Barnett against Lieutenant Governor Carroll Gartin in 1959. Barnett defeated Gartin to become Governor of Mississippi from 1960 to 1964.

‡ Jerry Lane was a dance band leader and trombonist from Jackson, Mississippi. Former band members include Tom "Bones" Malone.

₳ The Maurice Thompson Singers were a small vocal ensemble from Jackson, Mississippi, founded and conducted by S. Maurice Thompson (1903–1973). Thompson, a radio broadcast pioneer, had moved to Jackson in 1935 to be an announcer at WJDX. In the 1960s, he was the station manager for WLBT.
