= Así Es Nuevo México =

State song of the U.S. state of New Mexico

English: Such Is New Mexico
- State song of New Mexico
- Lyrics: Amadeo Lucero, 1961
- Adopted: 1971; 54 years ago

Así Es Nuevo México (English: "Such Is New Mexico") is the official Spanish language state song of the U.S. state of New Mexico, composed in a New Mexico music style. The words and music were created by contemporary composer Amadeo Lucero. It was performed with guitar accompaniment to the assembled members of the Legislature by Lieutenant Governor Roberto Mondragón at the opening session in 1971. It was enthusiastically received and promptly adopted as the Spanish-language version of the state song.

== Lyrics ==
Spanish

Un canto que traigo muy dentro del alma
Lo canto a mi estado - mi tierra natal.
De flores doradas mi tierra encantada
De lindas mujeres - que no tiene igual.

Así es Nuevo México
Así es esta tierra del sol
De sierras y valles de tierras frutales
Así es Nuevo México

El negro, el hispano, el anglo, el indio
Todos son tus hijos, todos por igual.
Tus pueblos y aldeas - mi tierra encantada
De lindas mujeres que no tiene igual.

Así es Nuevo México
Así es esta tierra del sol
De sierras y valles de tierras frutales
Así es Nuevo México

El Río del Norte, que es el Río Grande,
Sus aguas corrientes fluyen hasta el mar
Y riegan tus campos
Mi tierra encantada de lindas mujeres
Que no tiene igual.

Así es Nuevo México
Así es esta tierra del sol
De sierras y valles de tierras frutales
Así es Nuevo México

Tus campos se visten de flores de mayo
De lindos colores
Que Dios les dotó
Tus pájaros cantan mi tierra encantada
Sus trinos de amores
Al ser celestial.

Así es Nuevo México
Así es esta tierra del sol
De sierras y valles de tierras frutales
Así es Nuevo México

Mi tierra encantada de historia bañada
Tan linda, tan bella - sin comparación.
Te rindo homenaje, te rindo cariño
Soldado valiente - te rinde su amor.

Literal English Translation

A song that I carry deep in my soul
I sing it to my state - my native land.
Of golden flowers my enchanted land
Of beautiful women - which has no equal.

That's how New Mexico is
That's how this land of the sun is
Of mountains and valleys of fruited lands
That's how New Mexico is

The black, the Hispanic, the Anglo, the Indian
All are your children, all equally.
Your cities and towns - my enchanted land
Of beautiful women, which has no equal.

That's how New Mexico is
That's how this land of the sun is
Of mountains and valleys of fruited lands
That's how New Mexico is

The River of the North, which is the Rio Grande,
Its running waters flow to the sea
And irrigate your fields
My enchanted land of beautiful women
Which has no equal.

That's how New Mexico is
That's how this land of the sun is
Of mountains and valleys of fruited lands
That's how New Mexico is

Your fields are dressed with May flowers
Of beautiful colors
That God gifted them
Your birds sing, my enchanted land,
Their trills of love
To the heavenly being.

That's how New Mexico is
That's how this land of the sun is
Of mountains and valleys of fruited lands
That's how New Mexico is

My enchanted land bathed with history
So pretty, so lovely - without comparison.
I render you homage, I render you affection
Valiant soldier - he renders to you his love.

== See also ==
- "O Fair New Mexico", the English state song
