= Alton Adams =

American composer

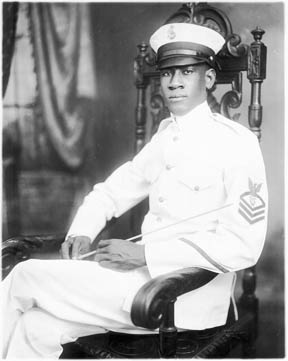
Alton Adams (1922) in his naval uniform

Alton Augustus Adams, Sr. (November 4, 1889 – November 23, 1987) was an American from the US Virgin Islands who is remembered primarily as the first black bandmaster in the United States Navy (beginning 1917). His music was performed by the bands of John Philip Sousa and Edwin Franko Goldman and his march "The Governor's Own" (1921) appears as the first selection on the bicentennial album Pride of America, released by New World Records.

== Early life and education ==
Adams was born in Saint Thomas, US Virgin Islands to aspiring artisan parents. He attended elementary school and later apprenticed to become a carpenter and then a shoemaker. During this time, he nurtured a passion for music and literature. Adams learned to play the piccolo (chosen primarily because the instrument was less expensive than a full-size flute) and joined the St. Thomas Municipal Band in 1906. Simultaneously, he studied music theory and composition late into the nights through correspondence courses with Dr. Hugh A. Clark at the University of Pennsylvania. In June 1910, Adams broke away from the Municipal Band to form his own ensemble—the Adams Juvenile Band. Adams' band developed rapidly, becoming part of the social fabric in the islands' capital city—the port of Charlotte Amalie—by playing for a variety of social and charitable events as well as regular concerts in the city's bandstand at Emancipation Garden, a location that remembers and celebrates Governor von Scholten proclamation which gave freedom to the slaves in 1848.

Adams had come to depend on music magazines from the U.S. mainland as a source of ideas and learning about music. His passion for reading and writing bore fruit as early as 1910 when he first contributed an article on the black composer Samuel Coleridge-Taylor to The Dominant. In 1915, he became the music editor for D. Hamilton Jackson's St. Croix newspaper The Herald. A year later he became the band columnist for Boston's Jacobs' Band Monthly. Bands at the time mostly performed rearrangements of orchestral music and Adams highlighted original works. Adams' essays garnered the attention of leading musicians in the States, such as John Philip Sousa and Edwin Franko Goldman. His grandiloquent prose style amplified a philosophy of social idealism about music's educational role in the community. When on the eve of its entrance into World War I, the United States purchased the Virgin Islands from Denmark, Adams possessed a unique combination of administrative skill and community service with credibility on the U.S. mainland and no problematic political entanglements that allowed him to take advantage of an unprecedented opportunity.

== Career ==
On June 2, 1917, Adams and his entire Juvenile Band were inducted into the United States Navy, thus becoming the first African-Americans to receive official musical appointments in the U.S. Navy since at least the War of 1812 and making Adams the Navy's first black bandmaster. It was an exceptional situation inspired by exceptional circumstance: the need to build a bridge between an all-white naval administration and a predominantly black population. Adams used his authority as bandleader and Chief Petty Officer with the Navy as a source of power, wealth, and influence. Their induction not only helped to defuse the racial tension that plagued the Navy's presence on the island during World War I, but the band, and Adams in particular, functioned as educators to naval administrators about the needs and attitudes of Virgin Islanders. Further, Adams continued to grow into his role as a social leader on the islands, serving as an officer of the local chapter of the Red Cross, helping to found the public library in Charlotte Amalie, and developing the islands' public school music education program. (What Island?)

He traveled to the U.S. mainland for the first time in 1922 to research music education programs, but the highpoint of his naval career was a 1924 tour of the U.S. eastern seaboard. With his U.S. Navy Band of the Virgin Islands in top form, Adams and the band won accolades from concert and radio audiences in Hampton Roads Virginia, Washington, D.C., Philadelphia, New York, and Boston. Adams' music is in the style of John Philip Sousa and communicates energy along with a core patriotism. His best known works include the "Virgin Islands March" (1919), "The Governor's Own" (1921), and "The Spirit of the U.S.N." (1924), dedicated to President Calvin Coolidge. This trip would turn out to be the apex of the band's success; the band never again enjoyed the notoriety on the U.S. mainland that its parades in Harlem had generated.

In 1931 Adams's unit was transferred to Guantánamo Bay, Cuba, when the naval government of the islands was replaced by a civilian administration, thus separating Adams from family, friends, and his source of social influence. Only a dozen works from a reportedly much larger output survived a December 27, 1932, fire that destroyed Adams' St. Thomas home. The blaze killed his daughter Hazel and burnt a cache of manuscripts, both scholarly writings and unpublished compositions. In 1933 he retired into the Naval Fleet Reserve and returned to St. Thomas, not long after resuming his duties for the public school music program. A brief return to newspaper editorship for The Bulletin [St. Thomas] was cut short by World War II, when he was recalled to active duty. Sent back to Guantanamo Bay Naval Base Adams took over an all-white unit and received permission to reinstate eight former bandsmen thus creating the first racially integrated band sanctioned by the U.S. Navy. The next year Adams and the other islanders were transferred to St. Thomas to reform the original unit, again as an all-black ensemble. The band would be transferred again in 1944, this time to Puerto Rico. Adams retired from the Navy permanently in 1945.

== Later life and death ==
Back in St. Thomas, Adams fused his interest in business and the community when he was appointed to the governing committee of the St. Thomas Power Authority. In 1947, he answered a call to increase the island's number of hotel rooms by opening up his home as the Adams 1799 Guest House. In 1952, Adams became a charter member of the Virgin Islands Hotel Association and was soon elected president, a position he held until 1971. During this entire period Adams served as a reporter, working as a stringer for the Associated Press as well as the Associated Negro Press and contributing regular articles to George Schuyler's Pittsburgh Courier and a host of other publications. He never ran for public office, but was closely involved in island politics as an advisor and editorial commentator. In 1963, the rededication of his composition, "Virgin Islands March", to the people of the Virgin Islands was officially accepted by the islands' legislature. In 1982 it became the official territorial anthem. Adams closed his guest house around 1983 and died in Charlotte Amalie on November 23, 1987, a few weeks after his 98th birthday.

== Legacy ==
Once all-but-forgotten, today Adams' story and his music are undergoing a renaissance. The United States Navy Band has rediscovered his music and a book including Adams' memoirs was published in 2007.

== Compositions ==
=== Marches ===
The Governor's Own March
2017 recording by a brass quartet of the United States Navy Band

Virgin Islands March
2004 recording of the USVI Territorial Anthem composed by Adams and Williams

- "Ingolf March" (1910) [missing]
- "Virgin Islands March" (1919)
- "The Governor's Own" (1921)
- "Spirit of the U.S.N." (1924)

=== Waltzes ===
- "Caribbean Echoes"
- "Childhood Merriment", dedicated to all his children, but especially Hazel who created the main melody

=== Bamboulas ===
- "Bull Passin'"

=== Solos ===
- "Warbling in the Moonlight" (piccolo with band accompaniment)
- "Doux Rêve d'Amour" (piano, 1912)

=== Songs ===
- "Sweet Virgin Isles" (1925)
- "Welcome to Our President" (1934), originally written as a song of welcome for Eleanor Roosevelt on a visit to the Virgin Islands and later revised for a visit of her husband, President Franklin D. Roosevelt.

Note: some scores to be published by fall 2007. See http://sitemaker.umich.edu/altonadams for more information.

== Recordings ==
- "The Governor's Own" is available on The Golden Age of the American March (New World Records 80266) performed by the Goldman Band (Richard Franko Goldman conducting).
