= One Mississippi (Steve Azar song) =

2019 song by Steve Azar

Song by Steve Azar

from the album My Mississippi Reunion
- Released: August 2, 2019
- Recorded: 2016
- Genre: Country
- Length: 5:26
- Label: Ride Records
- Songwriter: Steve Azar
One Mississippi
- Regional anthem of Mississippi
- Lyrics: Steve Azar, 2016
- Music: Steve Azar, 2016
- Published: August 2, 2019
- Adopted: July 1, 2022; 4 years ago
- Preceded by: Go, Mississippi

"One Mississippi" is a song written and recorded by American singer and songwriter Steve Azar. The song was written by Azar in 2016 to honor the state's bicentennial in 2017. It was then released as a single in 2019 and later added to the album My Mississippi Reunion. In July 2022, it was adopted as the official regional anthem of Mississippi. Shortly afterward, it was also adapted into a children's book.

== History ==
One Mississippi was written by Azar in 2016 at the request of governor Phil Bryant, to honor the state's bicentennial in 2017. This song would be released on August 2, 2019 as a digital single and later appeared on My Mississippi Reunion in 2020. In April 2022, state governor Tate Reeves signed a bill making "One Mississippi" the official state song of Mississippi and went into effect on July 1, 2022. On August 19, 2023, the song was also adapted into a children's book of the same name, with illustrations by Sarah Frances Hardy. Following the book's release, Azar performed the song at Pontotoc Elementary School in Pontotoc, Mississippi, and gave copies of the book to every child in attendance.
