= Carolina (state song) =

State song of South Carolina

"Carolina" is the official state song of South Carolina since 1911. In 1984, it was joined by "South Carolina On My Mind".

== History ==
The lyrics of the song are based on a poem by Henry Timrod. This poem was edited by G.R. Goodwin and was set to music by Anne Curtis Burgess. On February 11, 1911, acting on a recommendation by the South Carolina Daughters of the American Revolution, the General Assembly of South Carolina adopted Senator W.L. Mauldin's Concurrent Resolution that "Carolina" "be accented and declared to be the State Song of South Carolina." In 2024, additional lyrics were composed by Chris Franke Thom to be sung in lieu of original stanzas 2, 3, and 4 and were debuted in concert by the Lexington County Choral Society in Lexington, SC. The 2 new stanzas focus on the two state mottoes of South Carolina and mesh more modern thoughts into the older style romantic poetry by Henry Timrod.

== Lyrics ==
Call on thy children of the hill,
Wake swamp and river, coast and rill,
Rouse all thy strength and all thy skill,
Carolina! Carolina!

Hold up the glories of thy dead;
Say how thy elder children bled,
And point to Eutaw's battle-bed,
Carolina! Carolina!

Thy skirts indeed the foe may part,
Thy robe be pierced with sword and dart,
They shall not touch thy noble heart,
Carolina! Carolina!

Throw thy bold banner to the breeze!
Front with thy ranks the threatening seas
Like thine own proud armorial trees,
Carolina! Carolina!

Girt with such wills to do and bear,
Assured in right, and mailed in prayer,
Thou wilt not bow thee to despair,
Carolina! Carolina!
