= Here We Have Idaho =

Anthem of the U.S. state of Idaho

- Regional anthem of Idaho
- Lyrics: McKinley Helm; Albert J. Tompkins
- Music: Sallie Hume Douglas, 1915
- Adopted: 1931; 94 years ago

"Here We Have Idaho" is the official state song of Idaho. The music was originally composed by Sallie Hume-Douglas for a song titled "Garden of Paradise," which Hume-Douglas copyrighted in 1915. In 1917, two students at the University of Idaho used the music for their entry in a campus song contest. McKinley Helm wrote a verse for the song, and Alice Bessee adapted the "Garden of Paradise" music to fit. Under the title "Our Idaho," the song won the contest that year and eventually became the university's alma mater. The university later learned that Hume-Douglas had copyrighted the music, and obtained permission from her to continue using it for "Our Idaho."

In the meantime, Albert J. Tompkins, Director of Music in the Boise Public Schools, had written two additional verses for the song. These were combined with Helm's verse (used as a chorus) to form "Here We Have Idaho," which the Idaho Legislature designated as the Idaho state song in 1931.

== Lyrics ==
Verse 1

You've heard of the wonders our land does possess
Its beautiful valleys and hills
The majestic forests where nature abounds
We love every nook and rill

Chorus

And here we have Idaho
Winning her way to fame
Silver and gold in the sunlight blaze
and romance lies in her name

Singing, we're singing of you
Ah, proudly too,
All our lives through, we'll go
Singing, singing of you,
Singing of Idaho.

Verse 2

There's truly one state in this great land of ours
Where ideals can be realized.
The pioneers made it so for you and me,
A legacy we'll always prize.

Chorus

And here we have Idaho
Winning her way to fame
Silver and gold in the sunlight blaze
and romance lies in her name

Singing, we're singing of you
Ah, proudly too,
All our lives through, we'll go
Singing, singing of you,
Singing of Idaho.
