= My Michigan =

Song

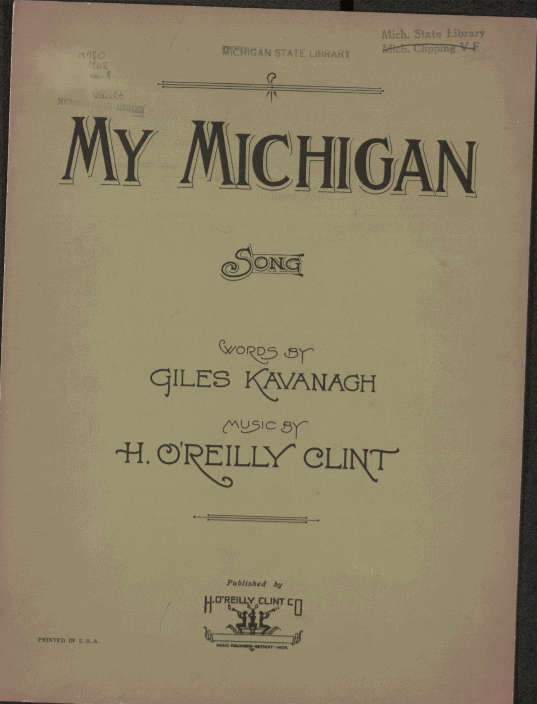
- Regional anthem of Michigan
- Lyrics: Giles Kavanagh, 1933
- Music: H. O'Reilly Clint, 1933
- Adopted: 1937; 88 years ago

"My Michigan" is an official song of the state of Michigan.

== History ==
It was written by Giles Kavanagh (lyrics) and H. O'Reilly Clint (music) in 1933. It was published by Clint's own music publishing company in Detroit. It was formally adopted as an official state song by the Michigan Legislature in 1937 by Concurrent Resolution 17.

Despite being an official state anthem, the song is rarely performed and has never been used on formal state occasions. The state government did not purchase and/or the authors would not sell the copyright. The song's copyright will expire at the end of 2028, the 95th year after its publication, per the Copyright Term Extension Act.

There are two versions of the sheet music; one is held at the Rare Book Room at the Library of Michigan and the other is housed at the Bentley Historical Museum.
