= The Ghost of Paul Revere =

American folk trio from Portland, Maine

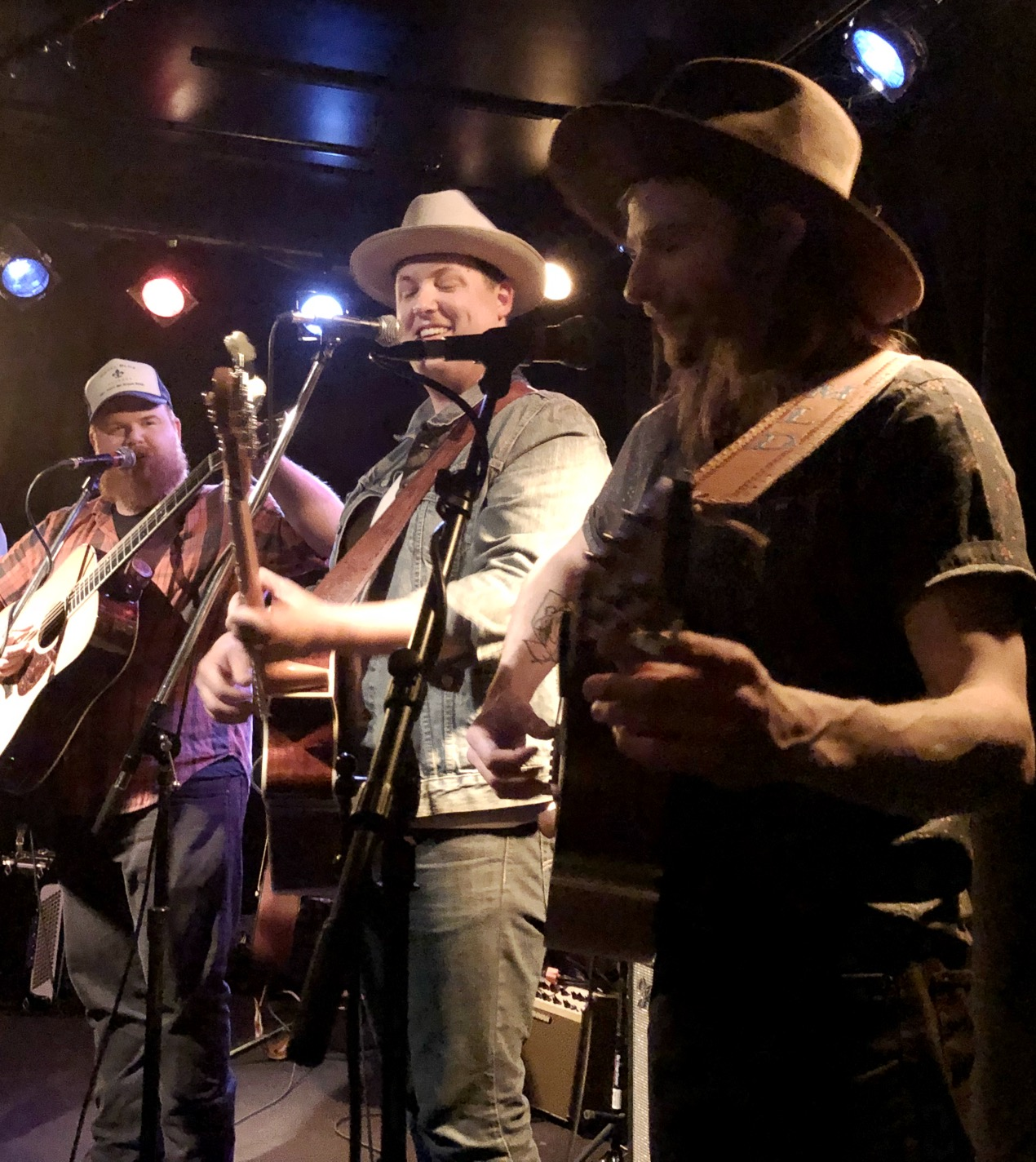

Background information
- Origin: Portland, Maine, U.S.
- Genres: Americana, folk, alternative country
- Years active: 2011–2022, 2026
- Members: Max Davis; Sean McCarthy; Griffin Sherry
- Website: www.ghostofpaulrevere.com

The Ghost of Paul Revere were an American folk trio from Portland, Maine composed of Max Davis, Sean McCarthy and Griffin Sherry.

== History ==
The band made their national debut as the musical guest on the TBS talk show Conan in January 2018.

In late 2017 and continuing through to their 2018 tour, the band was joined by pianist and accordionist Ben Cosgrove to make a quartet.

On June 7, 2019, the Ghost of Paul Revere song "Ballad of the 20th Maine" became the official state ballad of Maine. The song, written by Griffin Sherry, commemorates the 20th Maine Volunteer Infantry Regiment.

On April 18, 2022, in an Instagram post, the trio announced that they would disband following the Ghostland Festival.

In January 2026, the band announced that they would reunite for two shows in Portland, Maine in September 2026, one of which would be the revival of their Ghostland Festival. Both of these shows sold out.

== Members ==
Current members

- Max Davis - vocals, banjo, guitar (2011–2022, 2026)
- Sean McCarthy - vocals, bass (2011–2022, 2026)
- Griffin Sherry - vocals, guitar (2011–2022, 2026)

Touring members

- Matthew Young - harmonica, octave mandolin (2011–2019)
- Ben Cosgrove - keys, accordion, vocals (2019–2022)
- Charles “Chuck” Gagne - drums, vocals (2018–2022)
- Spencer Albee - organ (Hammond), vocals (2020–2022)

Timeline

== Discography ==
Studio albums

- Believe (2014)
- Monarch (2017)
- Good at Losing Everything (2020)
- Goodbye (2022)

Live albums

- Audiotree Live (2015)
- The Sumner Knight Series (2015)

EPs

- North (2012)
- Field Notes, Vol. 1 (2015)
- Field Notes, Vol. 2 (2019)
- Ghost Notes (2020)
- Field Notes, Vol. 3 (2021)

Singles

- Wolves b/w Ghostland (2019)
