= New Mexico – Mi Lindo Nuevo México =

Single by Pablo Mares
- Genre: State Song
- Songwriter(s): Pablo Mares

New Mexico – Mi Lindo Nuevo México is a song written and composed by Pablo Mares, which was adopted as the official bilingual song of New Mexico in 1995.

== New Mexico Statutes ==
The following information is taken from the New Mexico Statutes, Title 12, Article 3, Section 12-3-12. The words are included within the statute.

CHAPTER 12. MISCELLANEOUS PUBLIC AFFAIRS MATTERS
ARTICLE 3. STATE SEAL, SONG AND SYMBOLS
SECTION 12-3-12. STATE BILINGUAL SONG

12-3-12. State bilingual song.
A. The words and music of "New Mexico -- Mi Lindo Nuevo México", written by Pablo Mares, are declared to be the state bilingual song.

The words are:

I'm singing a song of my homeland
Most wonderful place that I've seen.
My song cannot fully describe it
I call it land of my dreams.
New Mexico,
Land of the sun
Where yucca blooms
The sunset sighs.
New Mexico,
Your starry nights,
Your music sweet as daylight dies.
My heart returns
It ever yearns
To hear the desert breezes blow,
Your snow, your rain, your rainbows' blend,
I'm proud of my New Mexico.

Translation:

Yo canto de un país lindo
Más bello no he visto yo,
Mi canción no puede decirlo,
Como mi corazón.
Nuevo México,
País del sol
Palmillas floreciendo allí.
Nuevo México,
Tus noches lindas
Traen recuerdos para mí.
Mi corazón
Llora por tí me dice a mí
Te quiero yo.
Tus sierras y tus valles
Son mi lindo Nuevo México.

B. A copy of the state bilingual song exhibited with this bill shall be filed with the secretary of state to be lodged in the archives of his office.

== Sources ==
- New Mexico Legislature, December 11, 2004
- State Names, Seals, Flags, and Symbols by Benjamin F. Shearer and Barbara S. Shearer, Copyright 2002
- State Songs America, Edited by M.J. Bristow, Copyright 2000
