= Wilhelm Ganzhorn =

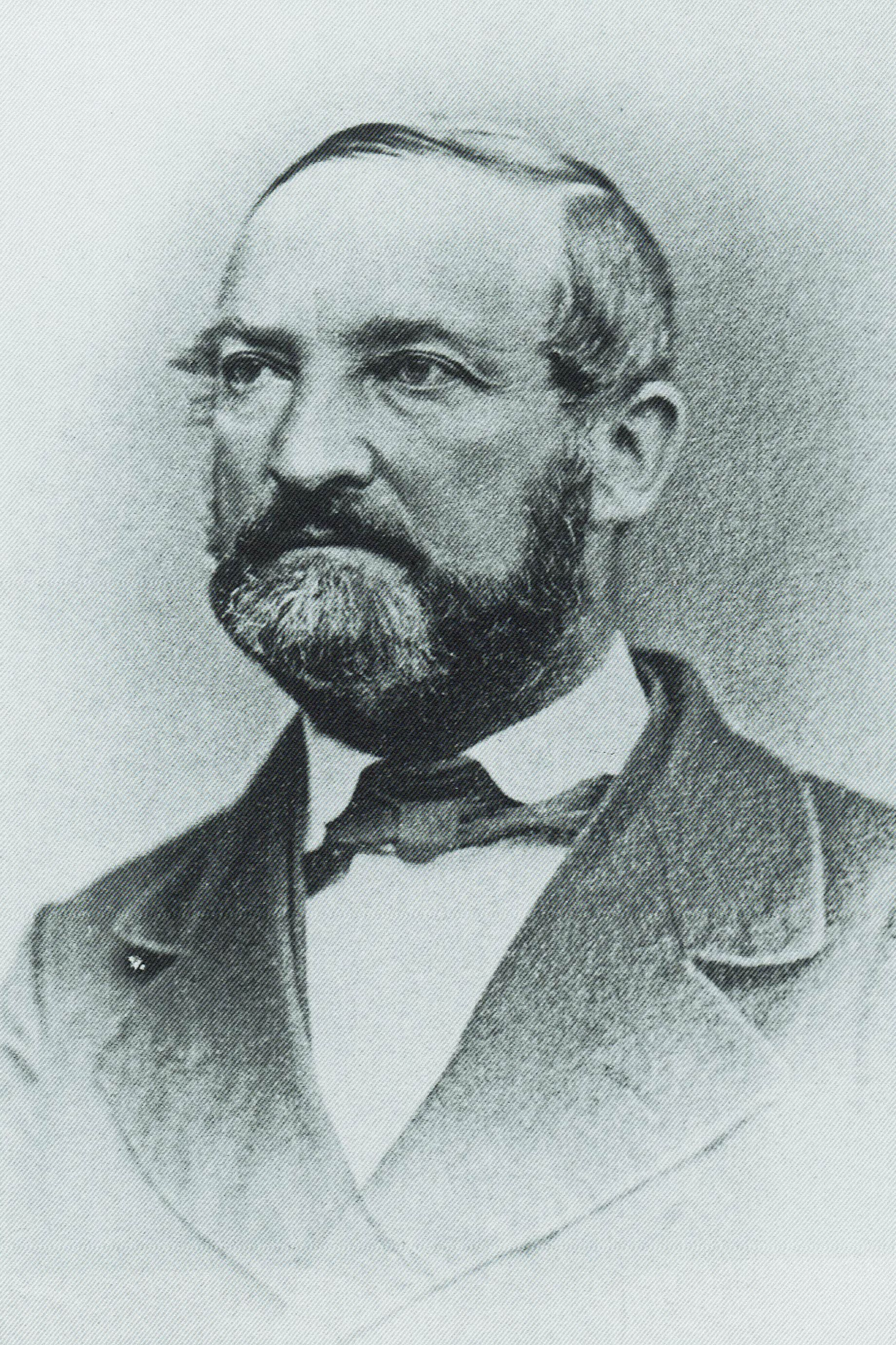
Wilhelm Ganzhorn

Wilhelm Ganzhorn (1818–1880) was a German judge and lyricist known for his 1851 song "Im schönsten Wiesengrunde". The melody of "Gi Talo Gi Halom Tasi", which is the regional anthem of the Northern Mariana Islands, is based on it.
