= South Carolina on My Mind =

Official state song of South Carolina by Hank Martin and Buzz Arledge

Single by Hank Martin and Buzz Arledge

from the album South Carolina on My Mind
- B-side: "South Carolina on My Mind (Instrumental)"
- Published: 1979
- Released: 1980
- Studio: Soundshop Recording Studios
- Genre: Ballad
- Length: 3:07
- Label: Palmetto
- Songwriters: Hank Martin, Buzz Arledge
- Producers: Buzz Arledge, Hank Martin

"South Carolina on My Mind" is a song written and recorded by South Carolinians Hank Martin and Buzz Arledge. It was adopted by South Carolina as a second state song under legislation approved by Governor Richard Riley on March 8, 1984. It joined "Carolina," which has been a state song since 1911.

== Composition and background ==
The ballad was composed by Hank Martin and recorded with his musical partner Buzz Arledge Jr. Martin was born in Columbia in 1944, grew up in Bishopville, and attended high school in Sumter. Arledge was born in Sumter in 1944, where the pair began singing together during high school.

Starting in the late 1970s, Martin and Arledge worked as professional musicians in Nashville, Tennessee, establishing the music publishing company Marledge. Martin also worked alongside Dolly Parton and performed on national radio and television commercials.

Martin was inspired to write the song in part by the poem "A Carolina Love Song," written by his father-in-law, the Reverend Riley Munday, a Baptist minister and humorist. The sheet music for "South Carolina on My Mind" was published in 1979, and the duo included the track on their 1980 album of the same title.

The ballad expresses nostalgic appreciation for South Carolina's distinct landscapes and seasons, referencing the Smoky Mountains, sandy beaches, and local agriculture.

I've got South Carolina on my mind,
Remembering all those sunshine Summentimes,
And the Autumns in the Smokies
When the leaves turn to gold

== Official adoption ==
The rationale for adopting a second state song was that "South Carolina on My Mind" had become a widely recognized and effective ambassador for the state, earning national exposure and generating positive impressions of South Carolina through tourism promotion, media coverage, and public performances. The legislature believed officially recognizing the song would foster state pride while helping attract visitors, investors, and new residents.
