= Jeb Bush 2016 presidential campaign =

American political campaign

Jeb!
- Campaign: 2016 Republican Party presidential primaries
- Candidate: Jeb Bush; 43rd Governor of Florida (1999–2007)
- Affiliation: Republican Party
- Announced: June 14, 2015
- Suspended: February 20, 2016
- Headquarters: P.O. Box 440641; Miami, Florida
- Key people: Danny L. Diaz (campaign manager); David Kochel (chief strategist); Jon Downs (media strategist); Tim Miller (communications director); Janan Grissom (chief operating officer)
- Receipts: US$35,415,732
- Slogan(s): Right to Rise
- Chant: Jeb!

The 2016 presidential campaign of Jeb Bush, the 43rd Governor of Florida, was formally launched on June 14, 2015, coming six months after announcing the formal exploration of a candidacy for the 2016 Republican nomination for the President of the United States on December 16, 2014, and the formation of the Right to Rise PAC. On February 20, 2016, Bush announced his intention to drop out of the presidential race following the South Carolina primary. Had Bush been elected, he would have been the first president from Florida (a distinction later assumed by Donald Trump) and the first sibling of a U.S. president (George W. Bush) to win the presidency himself.

Bush was not the first sibling of a former president to seek a party's nomination. President John F. Kennedy's brothers Robert (in 1968) and Ted (in 1980) both sought the Democratic nomination. Additionally, a pair of brothers had once-before both received nominations on a major party ticket. William Jennings Bryan was the Democratic nominee for president in 1896, 1900 and 1908. His brother, Charles W. Bryan, was the Democratic nominee for vice-president in 1924.

Bush was considered by many political commentators a dominant frontrunner for the nomination early in the primary season, and his candidacy, in which he failed to finish higher than fourth in a single primary election, is widely considered to have been a major political failure.

== Background ==
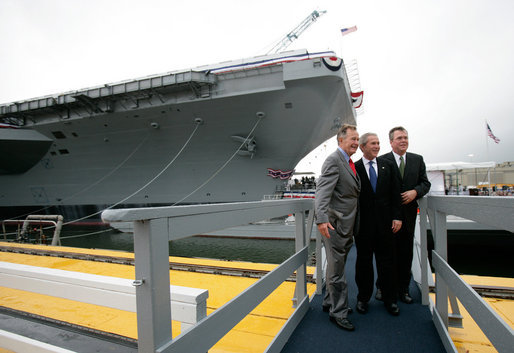
Governor Jeb Bush (R) with his father and brother, former President George H. W. Bush (L) and then-President George W. Bush (C) in 2006

In 1994, Bush was the Republican nominee for Governor of Florida, losing narrowly to the incumbent Lawton Chiles. Four years later, in 1998, Bush ran again, defeating Lieutenant Governor Buddy MacKay (incumbent Governor Lawton Chiles would die in early December 1998, so although defeating MacKay, Bush succeeded MacKay, who ascended upon Chiles' death). He was reelected in 2002 by a sizeable margin.

The second-born son of George H. W. Bush and younger brother of George W. Bush, the 41st and 43rd Presidents of the United States, respectively, Jeb Bush would have been, had he been elected, the first brother of a President, and his father, George H. W. Bush, would have been the first President to have two sons hold the same office.

There had been speculation that Bush would make a run for president since the end of the 2012 election. Speculation was fueled when he announced he would be "actively exploring" a run for president on December 16, 2014, and resigned from several corporate boards. It was further speculated that Bush had put off formally announcing a candidacy in order to raise unlimited amounts of money for his Right to Rise Super PAC, and prepare strategy; once formally a candidate, one cannot coordinate with PACs or Super PACs under campaign finance law.

=== Exploration of a candidacy ===
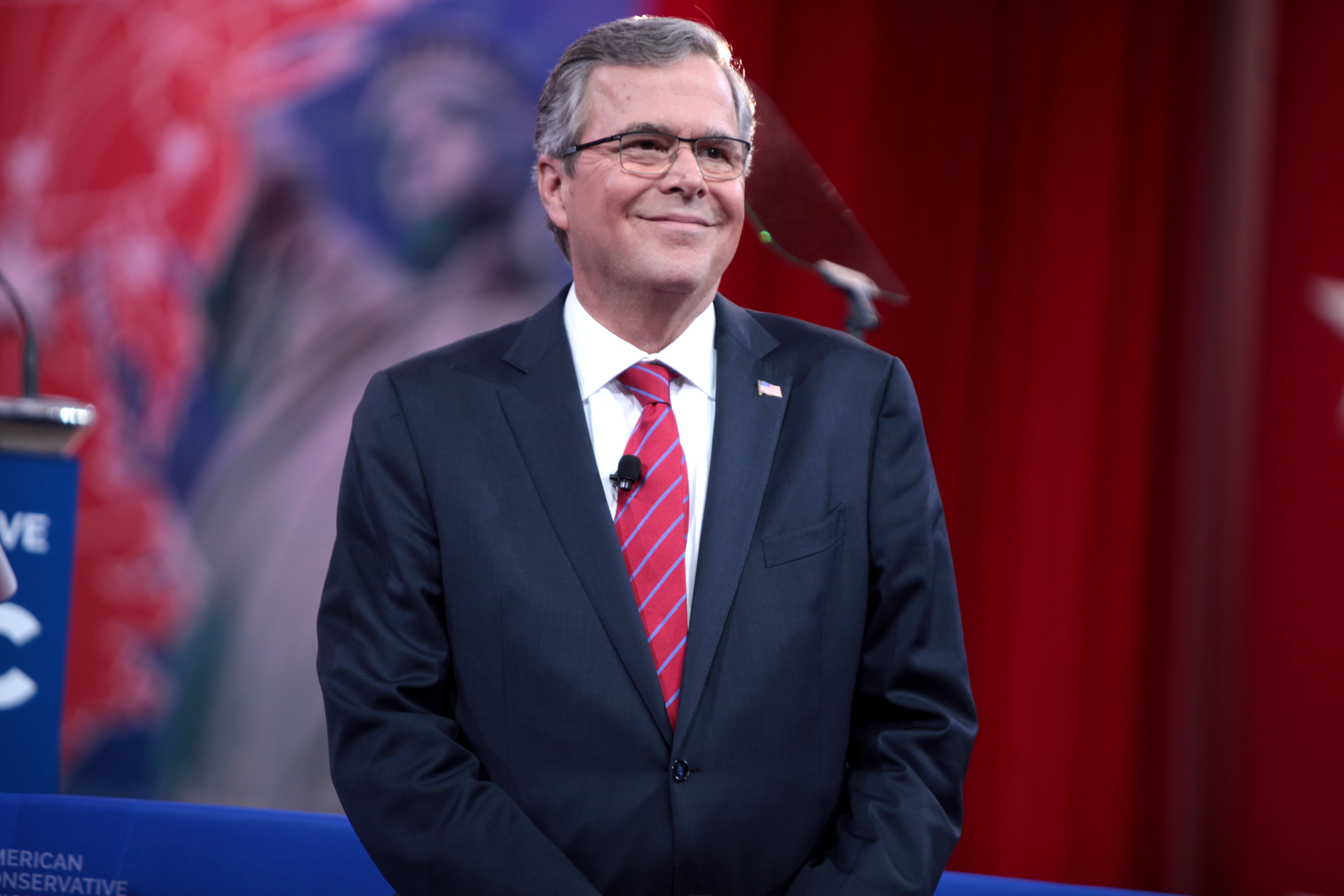
Jeb Bush speaking at the 2015 Conservative Political Action Conference in March 2015.

On December 16, 2014, Bush announced the formation of The Right to Rise PAC, a Super PAC intended to serve as an exploratory committee and fundraising mechanism for a potential candidacy. While not formally a candidate, he was the first potential contender to make any major moves toward the beginning of the 2016 election cycle. Widely seen as the 'establishment' candidate, Bush was expected to court and win donors who were central to the 2012 presidential election on the Republican side. While having repeatedly said he would not run again, 2012 nominee Governor Mitt Romney told donors in early January 2015 that he was seriously considering another run. With early polling showing significant buyer's remorse among many who voted for President Obama in 2012, and showing that he would defeat Hillary Clinton, Romney likely saw it necessary to see if he could tap into his donor base again, to which Bush was the likely successor. After several weeks' consideration, Romney chose against running again, after receiving criticism from many in his own party who wanted a fresher face, and having lost many staff who joined Bush's team before Romney reconsidered. With Romney conclusively out of the race, Bush was seen as the likely front runner for the nomination.

In February 2015, Bush preemptively released his official emails from his time as Governor of Florida, which came with some controversy as personal information, which was soon redacted, was included in the release.

By extending the 'exploration mode' of his 'potential candidacy' to a six-month period (his scheduled announcement one day short of six months after his exploratory phase), Bush used his time to get acquainted with the press, court donors, and prepare strategy. In doing this, he got around several campaign finance laws which limit donations which persons may make to individual's campaigns, and which prohibit Super PACs from directly coordinating with candidates' campaigns. By May 2015, it was roughly estimated that Bush had raised in excess of $100 million for his Right to Rise PAC, which is expected to exceed his challengers in the Republican field. On June 13, 2015, polling showed Jeb Bush to have support of 17.8% of the Republican electorate. No other Republican candidate was even polling in the double digits.

One of the largest issues expected to face Governor Bush was the unpopular image of his brother, President George W. Bush, as well as many who said they did not wish to see a third Bush in the presidency. Governor Bush came out saying "I'm my own man" with regard to his policies and vision, further saying "I love my mom and dad. I love my brother, and people are just going to have to get over that." Governor Bush publicly stated that his brother was his "top foreign policy advisor", having learned from his brother's presidency about "protecting the homeland", and that his brother "kept us safe."

Bush appeared as Bob Schieffer's final interview guest on Face the Nation during his retirement episode.

=== The Kelly File interview ===
In an interview with Fox News' Megyn Kelly, which aired on The Kelly File on May 11, 2015, Bush was questioned on a wide variety of topics, including the 2003 invasion of Iraq. Asked by Kelly:

Kelly: Knowing what we know now, would you have authorized the invasion?

Bush: I would have, and so would have Hillary Clinton, just to remind everybody, and so would have almost everybody that was confronted with the intelligence they got.

Kelly: You don't think it was a mistake?

Bush: In retrospect, the intelligence that everybody saw, that the world saw, not just the United States, was, um, faulty, and in retrospect, once we, once we, um, invaded, and took out Saddam Hussein, we didn't focus on security first, and the Iraqis in this incredibly insecure environment turned on the United States military because there was no security for themselves and their families. By the way, guess who thinks those mistakes took place as well? George W. Bush. Just for the news flash to the world if they're trying to find places between me and my brother, this might not be one of those...

Bush's answer to the question implying whether or not his brother, the President, made a mistake, generated controversy on both Republican and Democratic sides. The following day, in a radio interview with Fox News' Sean Hannity, Bush said "clearly there were mistakes as it related to faulty intelligence in the lead-up to the war and the lack of focus on security;" throughout the remainder of the week, Bush issued various answers on the topic. At a May 13 event in Nevada, Bush further said "...if we're going to get into hypotheticals I think it does a disservice for a lot of people that sacrificed a lot." By the week's end, May 15, Bush backed off his original statements, saying definitively, "knowing what we know now I would not have engaged — I would not have gone into Iraq."

== Campaign ==
=== Logo ===
In a branding decision, the Bush campaign unveiled a logo featuring his name with an exclamation mark that conspicuously left out the Bush surname. Although the logo was merely a variation of the campaign logo used since his first race for governor in 1994, it received criticism and was the subject of internet satire due to its use of the exclamation point and "whimsical" font. On a September 2015 episode of The Late Show with Stephen Colbert, Bush defended his campaign logo, saying "I've been using 'Jeb!' since 1994 — it connotes excitement."

=== Announcement and preliminary campaign ===
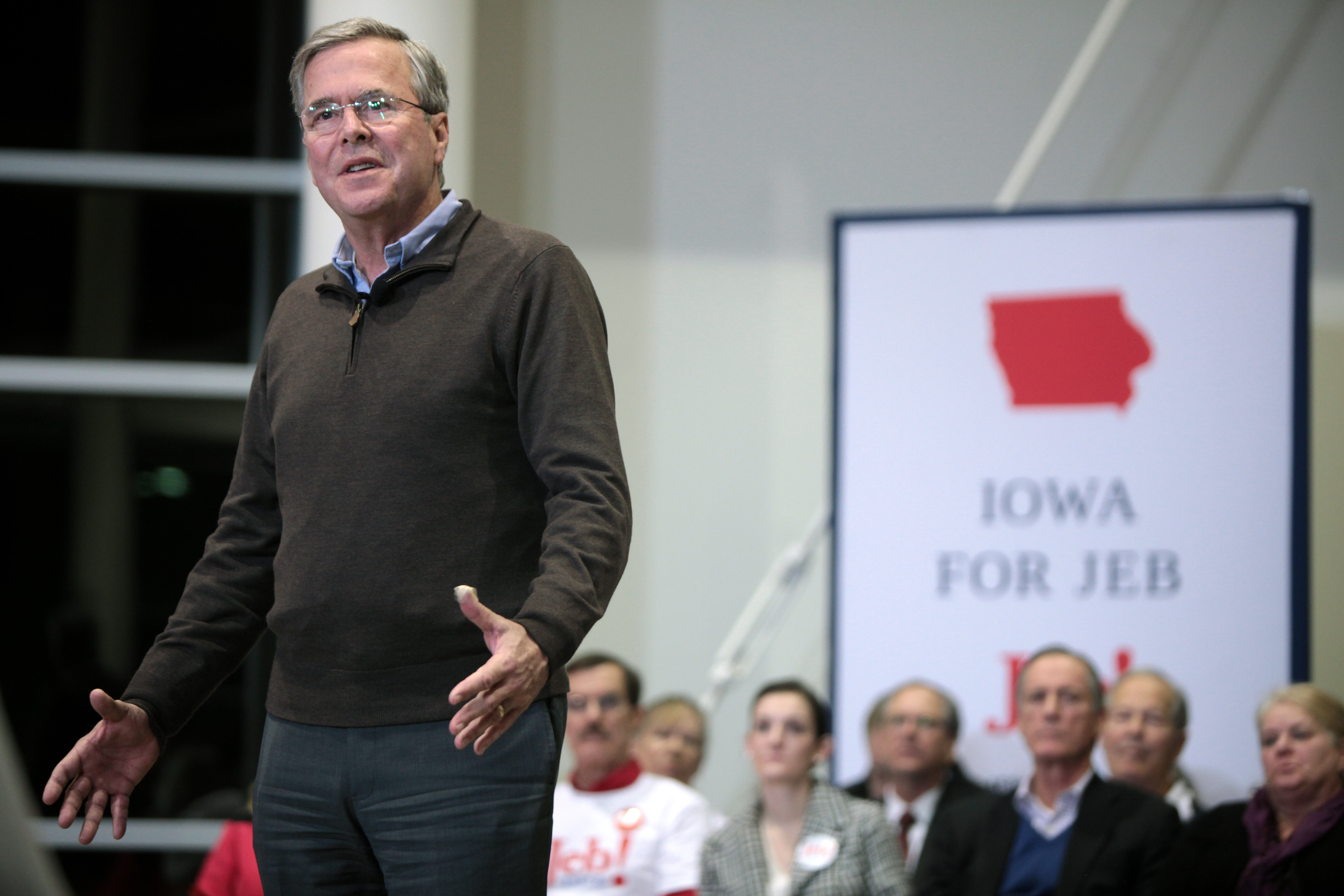
Jeb Bush speaking at a town hall campaign event in Ankeny, Iowa.

On June 4, the same day as Governor Rick Perry's formal campaign announcement, an anonymous Bush staffer leaked that Bush would formally announce his candidacy on June 15. Bush made a trip to Germany, Poland, and Estonia before returning to begin his campaign. On June 15, 2015, Bush formally announced his candidacy at Miami Dade College's Kendall Campus, in Miami, Florida.

Bush embarked on a tour following his June 15 announcement, with stops in Iowa, New Hampshire, South Carolina, and Nevada. The Bush campaign cancelled events in Charleston, South Carolina, in light of the June 17 mass shooting.

In early August 2015, while speaking at the Southern Baptist Forum in Nashville, Tennessee, Bush questioned the $500 million in federal funding for Planned Parenthood; a line from Bush's speech, "I’m not sure we need half a billion dollars for women’s health issues", garnered criticism and became a talking point at the August 2015 Republican Debate. Bush later said that he "misspoke", and that he meant to say that he would like the funds redirected to other women's health organizations, in line with his record as Governor of Florida; in 2003, Bush redirected $124,000 in funding from Planned Parenthood toward abstinence-only sex education programs.

On August 11, 2015, Bush gave a major foreign policy speech at the Ronald Reagan Presidential Library, outlining his positions on Middle Eastern issues.

=== "Jeb Can Fix It" ===
In November 2015, following a lull in poll numbers, Bush kicked off a tour to re-invigorate interest in Florida, South Carolina, and New Hampshire, dubbed the "Jeb Can Fix It" tour. The tour accompanied the release of an e-book titled "Reply All", which consisted of 730 pages of self-selected e-mails that Bush sent and received during his tenure as Governor of Florida.

=== Tension with Donald Trump ===
The dynamic between Bush and opponent Donald Trump was one of the more contentious relationships among the Republican contenders. Trump repeatedly mocked Jeb Bush with the epithet that he was "low energy". Trump told CNN "the last thing we need is another Bush" in the White House after the much-criticized presidencies of his father and brother. Trump criticized Bush's elder brother and his role in the Iraq War throughout the Republican debates, leading Bush to defend his brother. During an exchange between Bush and Trump in a February 2016 Republican primary debate, the audience repeatedly booed Trump. Trump scoffed that the audience was made up of "Jeb's special interests and lobbyists".

In August 2015, the Trump campaign released an attack ad against Bush known as the "Act of Love" ad. The advertisement played footage of Bush from a 2014 interview, where he characterized illegal entry into the U.S. by illegal immigrants as "an act of love." The ad showed mugshots of illegal immigrants who committed violent crimes in the U.S. interspersed with footage of Bush saying, "Yeah, they broke the law, but it's not a felony.... It's an act of love." During the August 6, 2015 Republican presidential debate, Bush defended his "act of love" statement, saying, "I believe that the great majority of people coming here illegally have no other option. They want to provide for their family." He added that "there should be a path to earned legal status" for illegal immigrants.

According to The Washington Post, the most telling aspect of the Bush–Trump duel may have been the fact that, "No candidate in the race was prepared for GOP voters' opposition to immigration, with the exception of Trump". Conservative political analyst Michael Barone pointed to Trump's two-pronged attack on Bush in the August Republican primary debate, for the "act of love" position on illegal immigration and for being weak, as a key moment in Trump's political rise.

As a result of his attacks at the hands of Trump, Bush's support among Republicans had fallen to 3% by early December. His campaign largely ignored Trump's attacks for most of the campaign, likely believing that Trump's campaign would eventually fall apart without Jeb needing to attack him. Although Bush began to more directly campaign against Trump in January and February 2016, his campaign had already stalled beyond resuscitation.

Trump also attacked Bush for his brother's handling of the September 11 attacks, saying in a 2015 debate, "I lost hundreds of friends in those attacks. Bush had the opportunity to kill Osama Bin Laden and he didn't" in response to Marco Rubio saying, "I am glad it was George W. Bush in the White House on 9/11 and not Al Gore."

=== "Please clap" ===
In February 2016, at a town hall event in Hanover, New Hampshire following the Iowa Caucus, Bush's call for the country to elect a strong commander-in-chief was met with silence from the audience; in response, Bush said to the audience "Please clap." A video clip of the incident went viral and was noted as a symbol of his campaign's sagging popularity.

=== Suspension of campaign ===
After a series of poor results in Iowa and New Hampshire, Bush spent his remaining money and campaign effort on the South Carolina primary. He placed fourth with under 8% of the vote. That night, Bush suspended his campaign, ending his presidential bid. In an analysis of what went wrong, Politico argued that:

His slow, awkward stumble from August through October encapsulates everything that caused the operation viewed as "Jeb!, Inc." to fail. Bush was on the wrong side of the most galvanizing issues for Republican primary voters, he himself was a rusty and maladroit campaigner and his campaign was riven by internal disagreements and a crippling fear that left them paralyzed and unable to react to Trump.

== Fundraising ==
On July 9, 2015, at a campaign fund-raising conference in the Bush family compound in Kennebunkport, Maine, Bush announced that super PACs which support his candidacy, mainly Right to Rise, had received a total of $103 million during the previous six months. The campaign itself had received $11.4 million, $700,000 a day, during its first two weeks.

== Endorsements ==
Jeb Bush endorsements

U.S. Presidents and First Ladies (former)

- George H. W. Bush, 41st President of the United States (1989–1993); candidate's father
- Barbara Bush, First Lady of the United States to George H. W. Bush (1989–1993); candidate's mother
- George W. Bush, 43rd President of the United States (2001–2009); candidate's brother
- Laura Bush, First Lady of the United States to George W. Bush (2001–2009); candidate's sister-in-law

U.S. Vice Presidents (former)

- Dan Quayle, 44th Vice President (1989–1993)

Executive branch officials (former)

- Spencer Abraham, 10th Secretary of Energy (2001–2005), former Senator from Michigan (1995–2001)
- William P. Barr, 77th United States Attorney General (1991–1993)
- Joshua Bolten, White House Chief of Staff (2006–2009)
- Donald Evans, 34th Secretary of Commerce (2001–2005)
- Marianne Lamont Horinko, Acting Administrator of the Environmental Protection Agency (2003)
- Dirk Kempthorne, 49th Secretary of the Interior (2006–2009), 30th Governor of Idaho (1999–2006), former Senator from Idaho (1993–1999)
- Bob Martinez, 2nd Director of the Office of National Drug Control Policy (1991–1993), 40th Governor of Florida (1987–1991)
- Michael Mukasey, 81st United States Attorney General (2007–2009)
- James Nicholson, 5th Secretary of Veterans Affairs (2005–2007)
- Henry Paulson, 74th Secretary of the Treasury (2006–2009)
- Susan Ralston, Special Assistant to President George W. Bush (2001–2006)
- Tom Ridge, 1st Secretary of Homeland Security (2003–2005), 43rd Governor of Pennsylvania (1995–2001), former U.S. Representative
- Pat Saiki, 17th Administrator of the Small Business Administration (1991–1993)
- John W. Snow, 73rd Secretary of the Treasury
- Michael Chertoff, 2nd United States Secretary of Homeland Security
- William H. Webster, former Director of the Federal Bureau of Investigation (FBI) & former Director of the Central Intelligence Agency (CIA)
- Julie Myers, former Assistant Secretary of Homeland Security for Immigration and Customs Enforcement

U.S. Governors (former)

- Lincoln Almond, 72nd Governor of Rhode Island (1995–2003)
- Jim Edgar, 38th Governor of Illinois (1991–1999)
- Luis Fortuño, 10th Governor of Puerto Rico (2009–2013)
- Judd Gregg, 76th Governor of New Hampshire (1989–1993)
- Mike Johanns, 38th Governor of Nebraska (1999–2005)
- Frank Keating, 25th Governor of Oklahoma (1995–2003)
- John McKernan Jr., 71st Governor of Maine (1987–1995)
- Bill Owens, 40th Governor of Colorado (1999–2007)
- Bob Riley, 52nd Governor of Alabama (2003–2011)
- Jane Swift, Acting Governor of Massachusetts (2001–2003)
- Fife Symington, 19th Governor of Arizona (1991–1997)
- Tommy Thompson, 42nd Governor of Wisconsin (1987–2001)
- William Weld, 68th Governor of Massachusetts (1991–1997)
- Sonny Perdue, 81st Governor of Georgia (2003–2011)

U.S. Senators (current and former)

- Thad Cochran of Mississippi
- Susan Collins of Maine
- Bob Dole of Kansas (former), also 1996 Republican presidential nominee and 1976 Republican vice presidential nominee
- Peter Fitzgerald of Illinois (former), also founder of Chain Bridge Bank
- Orrin Hatch, President pro tempore of the United States Senate, of Utah
- Dean Heller of Nevada
- Mack Mattingly of Georgia (former)
- Bill Frist of Tennessee (former)
- Kay Bailey Hutchison of Texas (former)
- Mel Martinez of Florida (former)
- George LeMieux of Florida (former)
- Alan K. Simpson of Wyoming (former)
- Lindsey Graham of South Carolina; former Presidential Candidate 2016, endorsed upon withdrawal
- Norm Coleman of Minnesota (former) (previously endorsed Lindsey Graham)

U.S. Representatives (current and former)

- Mimi Walters, Representative from California
- Mike Rogers, Representative from Alabama
- Jeff Denham, Representative from California
- David Valadao, Representative from California
- Steve Buyer, former Representative from Indiana
- Greg Ganske, former Representative from Iowa
- Vin Weber, former Representative from Minnesota
- Ann Wagner, Representative from Missouri
- Mark Amodei, Representative from Nevada
- Adam Kinzinger, Representative from Illinois
- Chris Collins, Representative from New York
- Tom Reed, Representative from New York
- Tom Loeffler, former Representative from Texas
- Patrick McHenry, Representative from North Carolina
- Thomas F. Hartnett, former Representative from South Carolina
- Pete Sessions, Representative from Texas
- Kay Granger, Representative from Texas
- Joe Scarborough, former Representative from Florida; media pundit
- Gus Bilirakis, Representative from Florida
- Vern Buchanan, Representative from Florida
- Ander Crenshaw, Representative from Florida
- Carlos Curbelo, Representative from Florida
- Mario Díaz-Balart, Representative from Florida
- David Jolly, Representative from Florida
- John Mica, Representative from Florida
- Jeff Miller, Representative from Florida
- Ileana Ros-Lehtinen, Representative from Florida
- Dennis A. Ross, Representative from Florida
- Daniel Webster, Representative from Florida
- Lincoln Díaz-Balart, former Representative from Florida
- Tom Feeney, former Representative from Florida
- Dave Weldon, former Representative from Florida
- David Trott, Representative from Michigan
- Mike Bishop, Representative from Michigan
- Gary Franks, former Representative from Connecticut
- Luke Messer, Representative from Indiana
- Eric Cantor, former House Majority Leader (from Virginia)
- Hal Daub, former Representative from Nebraska

U.S. Ambassadors (former)

- Chuck Larson, to Latvia (former), also former Iowa State Senator
- Jeanne L. Phillips, to the OECD (former), also on the board of the George W. Bush Foundation 501(c)3
- Mary Kramer, to Barbados (former), also former Iowa State Senator
- Warren Tichenor, to the UN (former).
- Pamela Willeford, to Switzerland (former).
- Rick Graber, to the Czech Republic (former), also former chairman of the Republican Party of Wisconsin
- Hushang Ansary, from Iran (1967–1969), also former director of the National Iranian Oil Company
- Francis Rooney, to the Holy See
- Mary Ann Glendon, to the Holy See
- Mel Sembler, to Italy and to Australia and Nauru
- Ned Siegel, to the Bahamas
- Warren W. Tichenor, to the United Nations and other International Organizations in Geneva
- Chase Untermeyer, to Qatar
- Nicholas F. Taubman, to Romania

Republican National Committee members (former)

- Allan B. Hubbard, former Indiana GOP chairman
- Jim Herring, former chairman of Mississippi Republican Party
- Clarke Reed, former chairman of Mississippi Republican Party

Statewide officials

- Kay Ivey, Lieutenant Governor of Alabama
- Walker Stapleton, Colorado State Treasurer
- Jeff Atwater, Chief Financial Officer of Florida
- Pam Bondi, Attorney General of Florida
- Adam Putnam, Florida Commissioner of Agriculture.
- Sue M. Cobb, United States Ambassador to Jamaica (2001–05) and Secretary of State of Florida (2005–07)
- Casey Cagle, Lieutenant Governor of Georgia
- Sam Olens, Attorney General of Georgia
- Stan Wise, Georgia Public Service Commissioner
- John Mutz, former Lieutenant Governor of Indiana
- Kerry Healey, former Lieutenant Governor of Massachusetts
- Terri Lynn Land, former Secretary of State of Michigan
- Bill Schuette, Attorney General of Michigan
- Mike Cox, former Michigan Attorney General
- Mike Chaney, Mississippi Commissioner of Insurance
- Brian Krolicki, former Lieutenant Governor and State Treasurer of Nevada
- Scott Pruitt, Attorney General of Oklahoma
- Catherine Templeton, former Director of the South Carolina Department of Health and Environmental Control
- John H. Hager, former Lieutenant Governor of Virginia
- Jerry Kilgore, former Attorney General of Virginia
- Richard Cullen, former Attorney General of Virginia

State legislators

- Four Alabama State Senators: J. T. Waggoner, Jimmy Holley, Steve Livingston, Gerald Dial
- Arizona State Senator: Steve Pierce (former President of the Senate)
- Arizona State Representative: Bob Robson
- Two Colorado State Representatives: Frank McNulty (former Speaker), Mark Waller (former)
- Twenty-one Florida State Senators: Anitere Flores, Rudy Garcia (former), Greg Evers, Andy Gardiner (Senate President), Garrett Richter (Senate President pro tempore), Bill Galvano (Senate Majority Leader), Denise Grimsley (Senate Deputy Majority Leader), Thad Altman, Aaron Bean, Rob Bradley, Lizbeth Benacquisto, Jeff Brandes, Nancy Detert, Don Gaetz, Dorothy Hukill, Jack Latvala, John Legg, Joe Negron, Wilton Simpson, David Simmons, Kelli Stargel
- Fifty-five Florida State Representatives: Steve Crisafulli (Speaker), Dana Young (Majority Leader), Jim Boyd (Majority Whip), Richard Corcoran (Speaker Designate), Janet Adkins, Ben Albritton, Frank Artiles, Dennis K. Baxley, Michael Bileca, Jason Brodeur, Doug Broxson, Colleen Burton, Fred Costello, Travis Cummings, José Félix Díaz, Manny Díaz, Jr., Brad Drake, Eric Eisnaugle, Heather Fitzenhagen, Erik Fresen, Matt Gaetz, J. W. Grant, Bill Hager, Gayle Harrell, Clay Ingram, Chris Latvala, Larry Metz, George Moraitis, José R. Oliva (Speaker for 2018–2020), Kathleen Peters, Cary Pigman, Holly Merrill Raschein, Ken Roberson, Ray Rodrigues, David Santiago, Jimmie Todd Smith, Chris Sprowls, Charlie Stone, Carlos Trujillo, Jay Trumbull, Ritch Workman, Arnhilda Badia (former), Juan-Carlos Planas (former), Julio Robaina (former), John E. Thrasher (former Speaker), Allan Bense (former Speaker), Larry Cretul (former Speaker), Dean Cannon (former Speaker), Will Weatherford (former Speaker), Lois Benson (former), Frank Attkisson (former), Jim Kallinger (former), Faye Culp (former), Trey Traviesa (former)
- Six Georgia State Senators: Brandon Beach, John Kennedy, Jeff Mullis, John Wilkinson, Matt Dollar, Joe Wilkinson
- Georgia State Representative: Ed Lindsey (former Majority Whip)
- Hawaii State Representative: Barbara Marumoto (former)
- Five Illinois State Senators: Bill Brady, Karen McConnaughay, Chris Nybo, Sue Rezin, Kirk Dillard (former)
- Five Illinois State Representatives: Raymond Poe, Adam Brown, Tom Cross (former), Renée Kosel (former), Skip Saviano (former)
- Indiana State Senator: James W. Merritt
- Indiana State Representative: Robert Behning
- Seven Iowa State Senators: Charles Schneider., Doug Shull (former), Merlin Hulse (former), John Putney (former), Jeff Lamberti (former) (see also Mary Kramer and Chuck Larson, Jr.)
- Twelve Iowa State Representatives: Ron Jorgensen, Zach Nunn, Ken Rizer, Linda Miller, Robert Bacon, Renee Schulte (former)., Terry Baxter, Janet Metcalf (former), Walt Tomenga (former), Willard Jenkins (former), Pat Shey (former), Gary Blodgett (former)
- Louisiana State Senator: Conrad Appel
- Louisiana State Representative: Nancy Landry
- Nine Michigan State Representatives: Kathy Crawford, Andrea LaFontaine, Mike McCready, Amanda Price, Ken Yonker, Laura Cox, David Maturen, Gail Haines (former), Mark Ouimet (former)
- Two Michigan State Senators: Goeff Hansen, Philip Hoffman (former)
- Two Mississippi State Senators: Merle Flowers (former), Charlie Ross (former)
- Nebraska State Senator: Beau McCoy
- Five Members of the Nevada Assembly: Paul Anderson (Majority Leader), John Hambrick (Speaker), Melissa Woodbury, David M. Gardner, Philip "P.K." O'Neill
- One New Hampshire Governor's Councilor: Bill Cahill (former)
- Five New Hampshire State Senators: Russell Prescott, Bruce Keough (former), Rhona Charbonneau (former), Bob Odell (former), Chuck Morse (Senate President)
- Nine New Hampshire State Representatives: William Gannon, Carlos Gonzalez, Barry Palmer, Robert Rowe, John J. Byrnes (former), Russell C. Day (former), Kevin Waterhouse (former), Lynne Ober, Russell T. Ober III
- New Jersey State Senator: Joseph Kyrillos Jr
- Two North Carolina State Senators: Tom Apodaca, Brent Jackson
- North Carolina State Representative: Charles Jeter
- Three South Carolina State Representatives: Samuel Rivers, Jr., Bruce W. Bannister (Majority Leader), Ralph Norman
- Two South Carolina State Senators: Paul Thurmond, Katrina Shealy
- Tennessee State Representative: Mark White
- Five Texas State Senators: Florence Shapiro (former), John Carona (former), Bob Deuell (former), Kevin Eltife, David Sibley (former)
- Four Texas State Representatives: Joe Straus (Speaker), Dan Branch (former), Dee Margo (former) Ed Emmett (former)
- Three Virginia State Senators: Ken Stolle (former), Ben Chafin, John Watkins
- Five Virginia State Delegates: Will Morefield, Bobby Orrock, David Yancey, Terry Kilgore, Jeff Campbell

Mayors and other municipal leaders

- Teresa Jacobs, Orange County Mayor
- Pat Brister, St. Tammany Parish President
- Edward F. Davis, former Commissioner of the Boston Police Department
- Emile Beaulieu, former Mayor of Manchester
- Scott Avedisian, Mayor of Warwick

International Politicians

- Ulf Leirstein, Norwegian MP (Progress Party)

Businesspeople

- California: Craig McCaw (cellphone pioneer).
- Florida: Charles E. Cobb (chief executive officer and senior managing director of Cobb Partners, Ltd.)
- Illinois: Byron Trott (banker).
- Mississippi: Dave Dennis
- New York: Woody Johnson (owner of the New York Jets), Henry Kravis financier
- Rhode Island: Glenn Creamer
- Texas: Gerald J. Ford (former CEO of Golden State Bancorp, no relation to President Ford), T. Boone Pickens (chairman of his investment firm BP Capital Management), Fayez Sarofim (investment manager, second largest shareholder of Kinder Morgan, part owner of the Houston Texans), John Nau (beer distributor), Trevor Rees-Jones (oil industry), David Weekley (construction industry), Ross Perot, Jr. (Dallas developer)

Newspapers

- Houston Chronicle
- San Antonio Express-News

Celebrities, commentators, and activists

- Jerry Bruckheimer, producer
- Virginia: Kay Coles James, former Director of United States Office of Personnel Management
- Toby Keith, singer-songwriter
- Jim Nantz, sportscaster
- Ana Navarro, political strategist and commentator
- Lynn Swann, former NFL player
- Brady Quinn, former NFL player

== In popular culture ==
In April 2016, Jeb! The Musical, a parody of the popular musical Hamilton, appeared on the Internet with Jeb Bush in the place of Alexander Hamilton, with political figures like Donald Trump and Chris Christie holding supporting roles. A staged reading, given "just as much preparation as Jeb's campaign", was staged at Northwestern University in June of that year. The parody was crowdsourced, with contributions coming from a range of writers from Yale University, Boston University, McGill University and the University of Michigan, who met in a Facebook group named "Post Aesthetics".

Due to the failure of the campaign and notable incidents such as Bush saying "Please Clap", Bush has become a common target for political jokes and internet memes from leftists and Trump supporters.

== See also ==
- Republican Party presidential candidates, 2016
- Act of Love (advertisement)
- Laudato si' § Impact on the United States political system
