= List of Florida state symbols =

Location of the state of Florida in the United States of America

The state of Florida has numerous symbols defined by state statutes. The majority of the symbols were chosen after 1950 —the state flower (chosen in 1909), the state bird (chosen in 1927), and the state nickname (chosen in 1970)—are not listed in the Florida Statutes. Under the Statutes, all state symbols fall under the purview of the Executive Branch (Title IV), Secretary of State (Chapter 15), as part of the secretary's role as "Chief Cultural Officer".

== Insignia ==
Type	Symbol	Description	Year	Image	Statute
Flag	Flag	A red saltire (diagonal cross) on a white background, with the seal of Florida superimposed on the center. The current flag was adopted in 1985, when the state seal was last changed. The basic design, however, dates back to 1900, when the design was approved by voters in a constitutional amendment.	1985	Florida flag	15.012
State day/week	Pascua Florida	Pascua Florida (Flowery Easter) is usually celebrated on April 2, unless the 2nd falls on a weekend. When it falls on a Saturday or Sunday, the governor may declare either the preceding Friday or following Monday as the state day. Pascua Florida commemorates the discovery of Florida by Juan Ponce de León on April 2, 1513. Children and adults may celebrate the holiday by attending educational programs focusing on the history of the area.	1953	—	683.06
Motto	"In God We Trust"	The state motto was not adopted until 2006; however, it has appeared on the state seal since 1868.	2006	In God We Trust	15.0301
Nickname	Sunshine State	The use of "Sunshine State" has been in place since 1949, when it first appeared on license plates. The nickname was made official by the state legislature in 1970.	1970		—
Seal	Seal of Florida	The seal has evolved since 1868, although the basic elements have remained consistent. Florida statute states: "The great seal of the state shall be of the size of the American silver dollar, having in the center thereof a view of the sun's rays over a highland in the distance, a sabal palmetto palm tree, a steamboat on water, and an Indian female scattering flowers in the foreground, encircled by the words 'Great Seal of the State of Florida: In God We Trust.'" The most recent revisions were made in 1985.	1985	Florida State Seal	15.03

== Florida plants ==
Type	Symbol	Description	Year	Image	Statute
Flower	Orange blossom (Citrus sinensis)	The fragrant blossoms of the orange tree also represent the largest portion of the state's agriculture industry, which stands behind only tourism as a proportion of the state's economy.	1909	Orange blossoms	–
Tree	Sabal palm (Sabal palmetto)	The sabal palmetto tree is native to Florida and coastal regions of North and South Carolina and Georgia. It has been widely used as both a landscape plant and as a food source; hearts of palm are the bud of the tree. Another name for it is cabbage palm.	1953	Sabal palm	15.031
Wildflower	Tickseed (Coreopsis)	There are several native tickseed species to Florida, though many nonnative species are widely planted in highway beautification and roadsides. They are named due to their round and small fruit (or achene) and two short spines, which make them resemble a bug. Aside from the Swamp Tickseed, most tickseeds have yellow ray flowers.	1991	Coreopsis	15.0345

== Fauna ==
Type	Symbol	Description	Year	Image	Statute
Animal	Florida panther (Puma concolor coryi)	The Florida panther is a critically endangered subspecies of the cougar native to southern Florida. While its numbers have rebounded from a low of about 25 in the early 1990s, there are only about 100 alive in the wild.	1982	Florida panther	15.0353
Bird	Northern mockingbird (Mimus polyglottos)	The northern mockingbird, native throughout Florida year-round, is also the state bird for four other southern states. Legislation was introduced in 2023 to change it to the flamingo.	1927	Mockingbird	–
Butterfly	Zebra longwing (Heliconius charithonia)	The zebra longwing is a common sight in Florida; the adult butterfly has a long lifespan because it consumes pollen as well as nectar, extending its lifespan from roughly two weeks to about three months.	1996	Zebra longwing butterfly	15.0382
Fish (fresh water)	Florida largemouth bass (Micropterus salmoides floridanus)	The largemouth bass is a sought-after sportfish, which is also the state (freshwater) fish for four other states. The Florida subspecies has smaller scales and grows larger than the northern subspecies.	1975	Florida largemouth bass	15.036
Fish (salt water)	Atlantic sailfish (Istiophorus platypterus)	The Atlantic sailfish is sometimes known as Istiophorus albicans, but the Florida legislature used the nomenclature I. Platypterus in the statute naming the state's salt water fish.	1975	Atlantic sailfish	15.037
Heritage cattle breed	Florida Cracker cattle	Florida Cracker cattle is among the oldest breeds in the U.S., descended from Spanish cattle which arrived in the 1500s.	2018	Florida Cracker cattle	15.0527
Horse	Florida Cracker Horse	The Florida Cracker Horse is a small horse, descended from horses brought to the state from Spain in the 15th and 16th centuries. They are known for their stamina, intelligence, quickness, strength, and easy ride. Their name is inspired by Florida cattlemen and the sound that their whips make when they move cattle.	2008	Florida Cracker Horse	15.0526
Mammal (marine)	Florida manatee (Trichechus manatus latirostris)	The statute naming the manatee as the state marine mammal did not identify the specific species, but the Florida manatee subspecies is the only one normally found in Florida waters.	1975	Florida manatee	15.038
Mammal (salt water)	Common bottlenose dolphin (Tursiops truncatus)	The statute naming the porpoise as the state saltwater mammal did not identify the specific species, but it is generally believed that the reference was intended to recognize the bottlenose dolphin. Dolphins are dark gray on top, and very pale gray on their underside, and range in length from 6 to 13 feet.	1975	Bottlenose dolphin	15.038
Reptile	American alligator (Alligator mississippiensis)		1987	American alligator	15.0385
Reptile (salt water)	Loggerhead sea turtle (Caretta caretta)	Florida is one of the world's two largest nesting areas for the loggerhead sea turtle. The turtle is a large (up to 7 feet) and heavy (up to 350 lbs) reptile with yellowish-to-brown skin and a reddish-brown shell.	2008	Loggerhead sea turtle	15.0386
Shell	Horse conch (Triplofusus papillosus)	The horse conch is one of the largest univalves in the world, capable of reaching a length of 24 inches. The young shells are often orange, while older specimens are usually greyish-white. They are found along the entire coast of Florida, in intertidal flats and coastal areas to a depth of 20 feet.	1969	Horse conch	15.033
Tortoise	Gopher tortoise (Gopherus polyphemus)		2008	Gopher tortoise	15.03861

== Geology ==
Type	Symbol	Description	Year	Image	Statute
Gem	Moonstone	Moonstone does not occur in Florida, but after the Apollo 11 mission, in which astronauts launched from Cape Canaveral landed on the moon, the state legislature chose to commemorate the mission by designating the moonstone as the state gemstone.	1970	Moonstone	15.034
Soil	Myakka soil	Myakka soil is the most widespread soil in the state. It is unique to Florida.	1989	Myakka Soil	15.047
Stone	Agatized coral	Agatized coral, which is a form of silicified coral similar to petrified wood, is found in Florida near Tampa Bay and in the Withlacoochee River (Suwannee River) region. It is the only gemstone found in the state.	1979	Agatized coral	15.0336

== Culture ==
Type	Symbol	Description	Year	Image	Statute
Anthem	"Florida (Where the Sawgrass Meets the Sky)"	Written by music teacher Jan Hinton, "Florida (Where the Sawgrass meets the Sky)" was first heard in an online contest organized by the Florida Music Association in the hopes of finding a song that represented the state. In a legislative session in 2008, it was decided that the song would share its state song title with a revised version of the old state song, "Old Folks at Home".	2008	Where the Sawgrass Meets the Sky	15.0326
Beverage	Orange juice	Oranges are the most valuable agricultural product of the state, and over 95% of Florida's orange production is processed, the vast majority of which becomes orange juice.	1967	Orange juice	15.032
Dessert	Strawberry shortcake	Plant City, Florida annually hosts the Florida Strawberry Festival, where strawberry shortcakes are the signature dessert, and the region's strawberries account for 75% of the United States' winter strawberry crop. Strawberry shortcake became the state dessert after the Florida Senate passed a bill to have it recognized by the state. The state dessert is separate from the state pie, Key Lime Pie, and both titles co-exist as being recognized by Florida.	2022	Strawberry shortcake	S.B. 1006
Festival	"Calle Ocho-Open House 8"	"El Festival de la Calle Ocho" (the Calle Ocho Festival) is a one-day rumba (fiesta) held at the end of the Miami Carnaval. The Calle Ocho Festival is held in March on Calle Ocho in Little Havana, Miami (Southwest 8th Street from 27th Avenue and 4th Avenue).	1980	Calle Ocho Festival	15.0395
Fruit	Orange	Oranges are the most valuable agricultural commodity of the state, which produces almost three-quarters of all oranges produced in the United States.	2005	Oranges	15.0315
Citrus archive	Florida Citrus Archives	Housed at Florida Southern College in Lakeland, Florida, the Florida Citrus Archives are an extensive collection of citrus related materials, believed by many in the citrus industry to be the largest collection of its kind.	2001		15.0325
Pie	Key lime pie	Key lime pie (traditionally made with Key limes from the Florida Keys) is made with condensed milk, which does not require refrigeration, an important consideration in the Keys before the widespread availability of refrigeration. Prior to the construction of the Overseas Railroad, fresh milk was a rare commodity. Key lime pie made with Key limes (as opposed to Persian limes) is pale yellow, not green.	2006	Key lime pie	15.052
Play	Cross and Sword	Cross and Sword, a pageant based on the play written by Paul Green, is a dramatization of the Spanish colonization of St. Augustine, Florida, the nation's first city. The stories of Pedro Menéndez, Jean Ribault, and Father López, some of Florida's earliest European settlers, are told.	1973		15.035
Rodeo	Silver Spurs Rodeo	The Silver Spurs Rodeo, which began as an effort to buy war bonds, is now billed as the largest rodeo east of the Mississippi River.	1994	Silver Spurs Rodeo	15.0391
Railroad museum	Gold Coast Railroad Museum	Founded in 1956, the Gold Coast Railroad Museum was built on the grounds of the former Naval Air Station Richmond in Miami, Florida. The Gold Coast Railroad Museum is one of three official state railroad museums in Florida.	1984	Gold Coast Railroad Museum	15.045(2)(b)
Railroad museum	Florida Gulf Coast Railroad Museum	The Florida Gulf Coast Railroad Museum, in Parrish, Florida, is one of three official state railroad museums in Florida.	1984	Florida Gulf Coast Railroad Museum	15.045(2)(c)
Song	"Old Folks at Home"	From 1913 to 1935, the state song was "Florida, My Florida," by Rev. Dr. C. V. Waugh, sung to the tune of "O Tannenbaum." Stephen Foster named the song "Old Folks at Home" but it is often referred to as "Swanee River."	1935^{[A]}	Old Folks at Home	15.0327

== State quarter ==
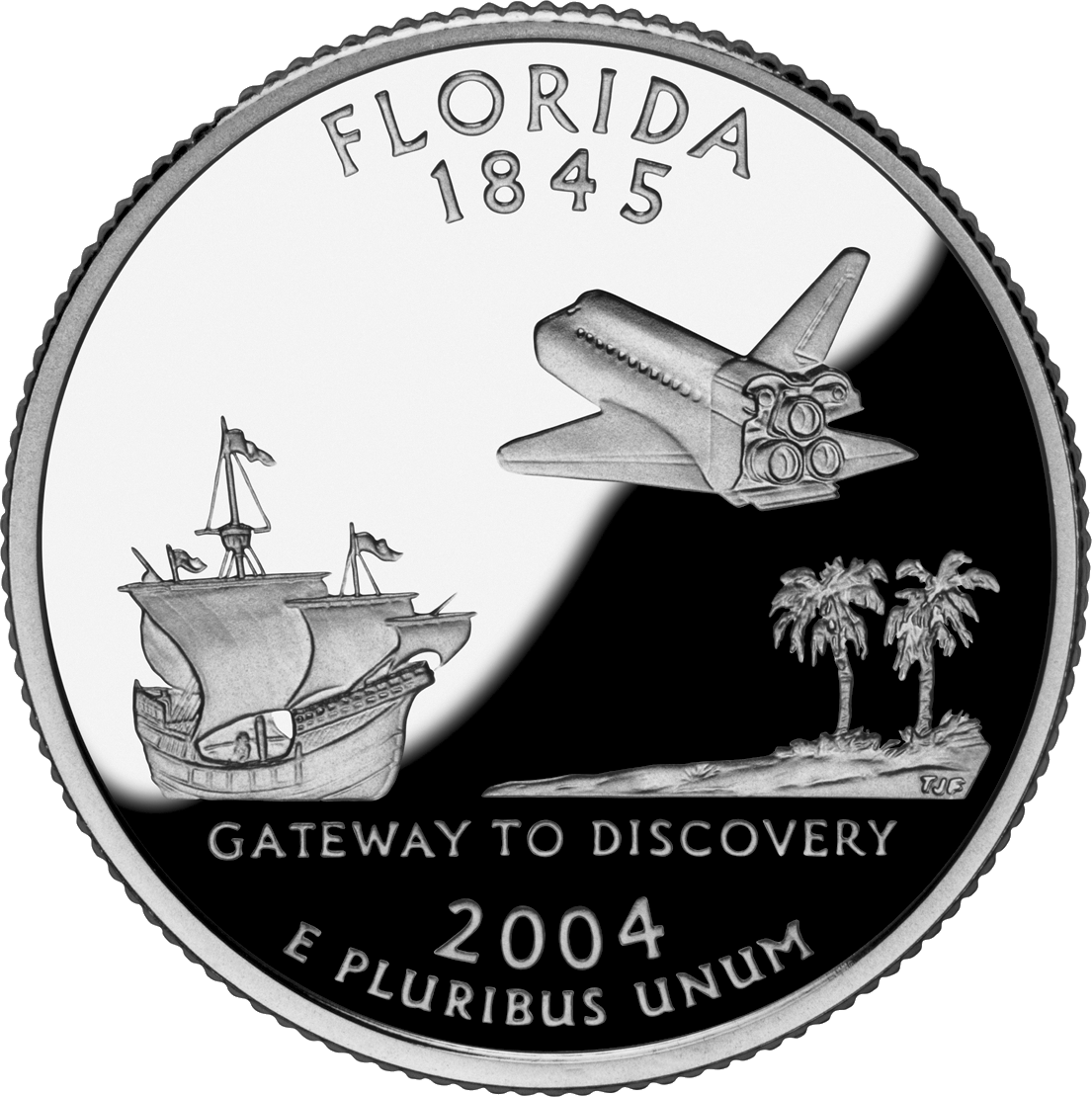
State quarter for Florida

== See also ==
- List of Florida-related topics
- Lists of United States state insignia
- State of Florida

== Notes ==
^{A} The state song was originally selected through a House Concurrent resolution in 1935, but was defined by statute (with revised lyrics) in 2008.
