= Florida (Where the Sawgrass Meets the Sky) =

Official song of Florida, by Jan Hinton

"Florida, Where the Sawgrass Meets the Sky" is the official anthem of the State of Florida, written and composed by Jan Hinton. Originally written as a replacement for the state song, "Old Folks at Home" ("Suwanee River"), it was instead designated as the state's anthem in 2008.

== Background ==
Florida, which became a U.S. state in 1845, did not have a state song until 1913. On May 12, 1913, Governor Park Trammell signed a bill which designated "Florida, My Florida" as the state song. "Florida, My Florida" was sung to the tune of the German Christmas song "O Tannenbaum", whose tune was also used for the official state songs of Maryland ("Maryland, My Maryland") and Iowa ("The Song of Iowa"), and for the unofficial state song of Michigan ("Michigan, My Michigan"). In 1935, a resolution changed the state song to "Swannee River" [sic].

"Old Folks at Home," (also known as "Swanee River", "Swanee Ribber" [from the original lyrics], or "Suwannee River") is a minstrel song written by Stephen Foster in 1851. It has lyrics which are widely considered to be racist, with lines such as "longing for de old plantation" and "Oh! darkies how my heart grows weary"; The state Department of Education had altered the lyrics in the 1970s for performance in schools, but the official lyrics still contained the racially unacceptable verbiage. In 1983, then-governor Bob Graham suggested adding another, more upbeat state song. In 1997, state Representative Willie Logan introduced a bill to change the song, citing the offensive nature of the lyrics; the bill was strongly opposed by lawmakers who represented the Suwannee River region, and ultimately was withdrawn by Logan.

== New song sought ==
In 2007, Charlie Crist refused to have "Old Folks at Home" played at his gubernatorial inauguration, opting for a less controversial, more contemporary piece. He encouraged state Senator Tony Hill, who was the leader of the legislature's Black Caucus, to find a new song. Hill joined forces with state Representative Ed Homan and the Florida Music Education Association to sponsor a contest for a new state song.

== Selection of new song ==
The contest received 243 submissions. After narrowing the field down to three finalists, the nominees were voted upon by the general public at a site set up specifically for the contest. "Florida (Where the Sawgrass Meets the Sky)", composed by Jan Hinton, received more than half of all the votes cast. Foster and Hinton are not Florida natives, but Hinton lived in Florida while Foster never visited the state. Hinton had emigrated to Florida twelve years before she wrote "Florida (Where the Sawgrass Meets the Sky). Senator Hill introduced SB 1558, which designated Hinton's contribution as the new state song.

== Debate and compromise ==
However, similar to the response in 1997, the bill met opposition from northern Florida historians who felt that the new song denied Florida's heritage. Senator Nancy Argenziano stated:

A lot of people have expressed to me they don't agree with the old lyrics which we don't use anymore. But Suwannee River is a big part of Florida. While the old lyrics are very objectionable, they haven't been used. I'm trying to listen to my constituents and they really believe you shouldn't change that song. So I have a hard time with that one."

Senator Jim King suggested a compromise, in which "Florida (Where the Sawgrass Meets the Sky)" was designated as the state anthem, and a Bowdlerized version of "Old Folks at Home" remained as the state song. The new lyrics of "Old Folks at Home" were approved by scholars at the Stephen Foster Memorial at the University of Pittsburgh. Governor Crist stated that he was not pleased by the "two songs" decision, but signed the bill, creating a new state anthem and establishing the reworded version of "Old Folks at Home" as the State Song under state statute, rather than by resolution, like the 1935 decision.
