= Sharon Cooper =

American registered nurse and politician

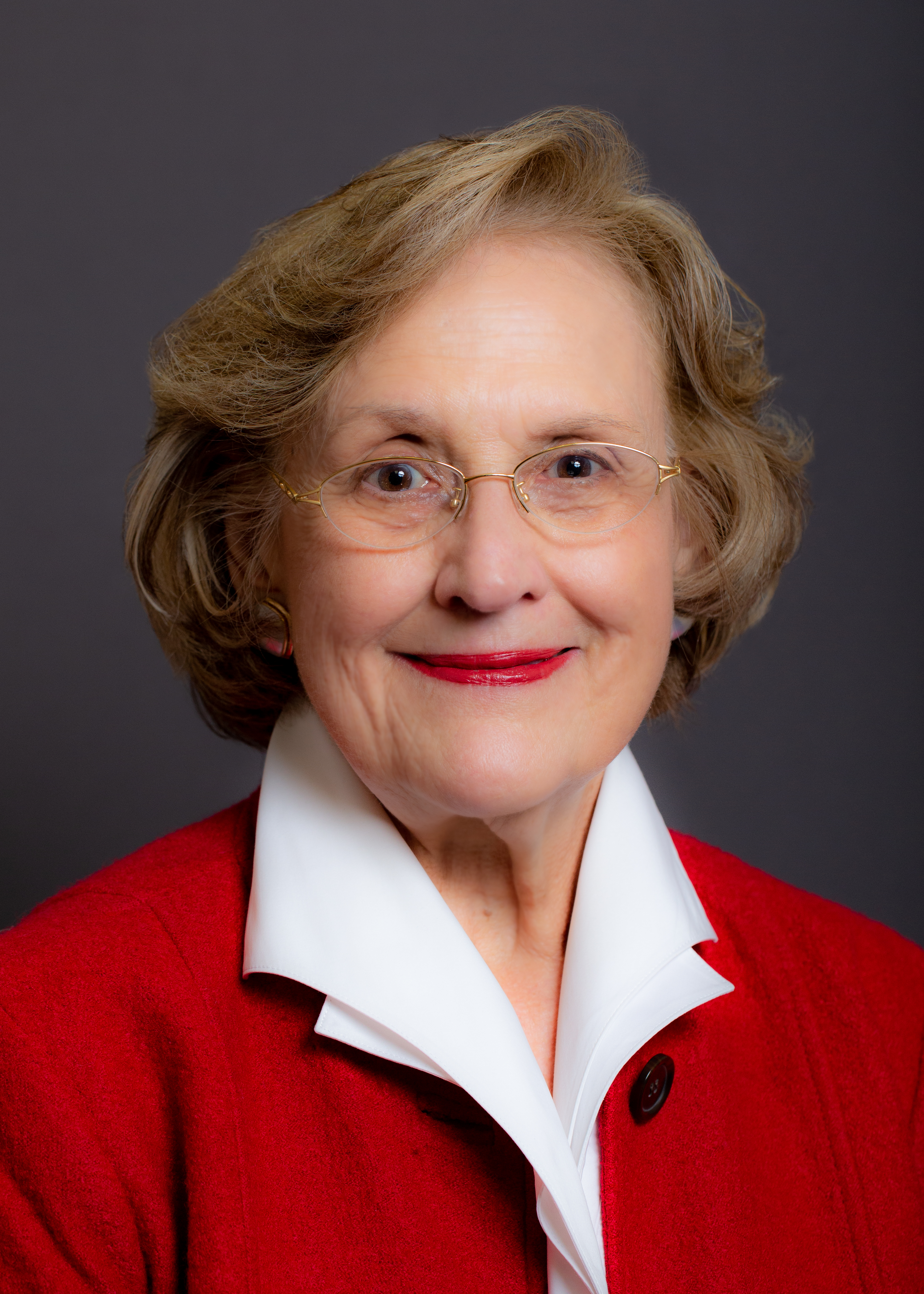
- Official portrait, 2025

Member of the Georgia House of Representatives
- Incumbent
- Assumed office January 13, 1997
- Preceded by: Lynda Coker
- Constituency: 31st district (1997–2003); 30th district (2003–2005); 41st district (2005–2013); 43rd district (2013–2023); 45th district (2023–present)

Personal details
- Born: October 23, 1942 (age 83) Houston, Texas, U.S.
- Party: Republican
- Spouse: Tom Cooper (m. 1980; died 2013)
- Education: University of Tennessee (BS); University of South Florida (MA); Medical College of Georgia (BSN, MSN)
- Occupation: Medical administrator
- Website: State house website Campaign website

Sharon Meyer Cooper (born October 23, 1942) is an American former registered nurse and politician. She is a Republican representing the 45th district in Marietta, Georgia.

== Early life ==
On October 23, 1942, Cooper was born in Houston, Texas.

== Education ==
In 1968, Cooper earned a BS degree in Child Development from the University of Tennessee. In 1970, Cooper earned an MA degree in Education/Disadvantage Learners from University of South Florida. Cooper earned her BSN and MSN degrees in nursing from Medical College of Georgia.

== Career ==
Cooper is a former registered nurse and a medical administrator.

In 1992, Cooper was a campaign volunteer. In 1996, Cooper's political career began when she won the election for Georgia House of Representatives district 41.

Cooper is a member of the Georgia House of Representatives. Cooper is a Republican representing District 43 (was District 41), which encompasses parts of Cobb County. In 2004, Cooper became the Majority Caucus Chairperson and one of the highest ranking women politician in the Georgia House of Representatives. In 2007, Cooper became the Majority Caucus Chairman Emeritus. Cooper is also the Chairperson of the Health and Human Services Committee.

== Awards ==
- 2000 Legislator of the Year, Georgia Republican Party.
- 2014 GA Senior Living Association Legislator of the Year Award.

== Personal life ==
Cooper's husband was Tom Cooper (died 2013), a bariatric physician.

Georgia House of Representatives
Preceded by Lynda Coker	Member of the Georgia House of Representatives from the 31st district 1997–2003	Succeeded by Matt Dollar
Preceded by Rich Golick	Member of the Georgia House of Representatives from the 30th district 2003–2005	Succeeded by Tom McCall
Preceded by Joe Wilkinson	Member of the Georgia House of Representatives from the 41st district 2005–2013	Succeeded by Michael Smith
Preceded by John Carson	Member of the Georgia House of Representatives from the 43rd district 2013–2023	Succeeded by Solomon Adesanya
Preceded by Mitchell Kaye	Member of the Georgia House of Representatives from the 45th district 2023–Present	Incumbent
