= Rob Wallace (politician) =

American politician (born 1952)

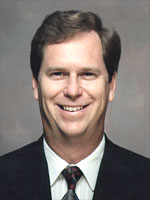

Member of the Florida House of Representatives from the 47th district
- In office November 8, 1994 – November 5, 2002
- Preceded by: Brian Rush
- Succeeded by: Kevin Ambler

Personal details
- Born: May 8, 1952 (age 74) Hutchinson, Kansas
- Party: Republican
- Children: 4
- Education: University of South Florida (B.S.)
- Occupation: Engineer

Rob Wallace (born May 8, 1952) is a Republican politician from Florida who served as a member of the Florida House of Representatives from the 47th district from 1994 to 2002.

== Early life ==
Wallace was born in Hutchinson, Kansas, in 1952, and he moved to Florida in 1954. He attended the University of South Florida, graduating with his bachelor's degree in engineering in 1974, and worked for the Hillsborough County utilities department as an engineer until 1979, when he founded Environmental Engineering Consultants.

== Florida House of Representatives ==
In 1994, Wallace ran for the Florida House of Representatives, challenging incumbent State Representative Brian Rush, a Democrat, in the 47th district, which included northern Hillsborough and Pinellas counties. Wallace faced Will Craig, a former legislative aide and lobbyist, in the Republican primary, and narrowly defeated him, winning 50.2 percent of the vote to his 49.8 percent. Wallace's victory was confirmed following a recount, which concluded that Wallace defeated Craig by 24 votes. In the general election, Wallace defeated Rush by a thin margin, receiving 52 percent of the vote to Rush's 48 percent.

Wallace ran for re-election in 1996, and was challenged by Craig in a rematch of their 1994 campaign. Unlike the previous primary, Wallace defeated Craig by a wide margin, winning 64 percent of the vote to Craig's 34 percent. He was opposed in the general election by Democrat Mary Dunkle, a nurse. Wallace ultimately defeated Dunkle, winning 57–43 percent. Dunkle challenged Wallace again in 1998, and won by a similar margin, receiving 58 percent of the vote to her 42 percent.

In 2000, Wallace ran for a fourth term, and was challenged by Democrat Monte Belote, a consumer advocate. He defeated Belote in a landslide, winning 64–36 percent. Wallace was term-limited in 2002, and was succeeded by Republican Kevin Ambler.

== 2012 State Senate campaign ==
Wallace re-entered politics in 2012 to challenge State Senator Jim Norman, who was seeking re-election in the 17th district, in the Republican primary. Norman faced an ethics inquiry over a $500,000 gift that his wife had received from a businessman, and ultimately dropped out of the race. In the Republican primary, Wallace faced State Representative John Legg and security consultant John Koreas. Legg won the primary by a wide margin, receiving 62 percent of the vote to Wallace's 23 percent and Korsak's 15 percent.
