= Kevin Ambler =

American attorney (born 1961)

Honorable Kevin Ambler Esq.
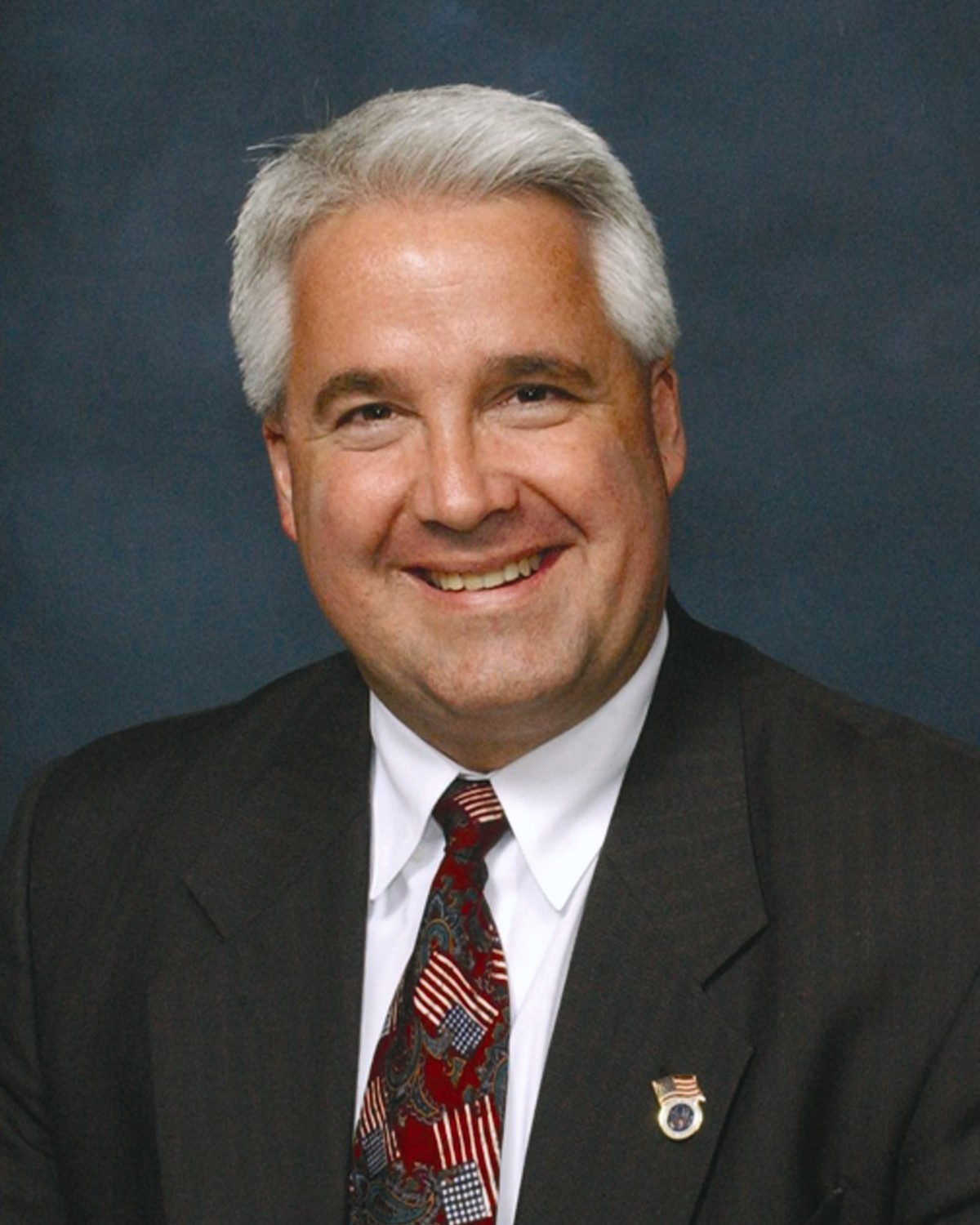
- Honorable Kevin Ambler, Esq.

Member of the Florida House of Representatives from the 47 district
- In office 2002–2010
- Preceded by: Rob Wallace
- Succeeded by: Jamie Grant

Personal details
- Born: March 10, 1961 (age 65) Los Angeles, California, U.S.
- Party: Republican
- Spouse: Mindy Ambler
- Children: Jason Ambler, Jami Ambler
- Education: Cornell University (BA), Southwestern University School of Law (JD)
- Profession: Attorney
- Website: Official House Website Law Office Website

Military service
- Allegiance: United States
- Branch/service: United States Air Force
- Years of service: 1986-2005
- Rank: Major
- Awards: Air Force Achievement Medal, Air Force Commendation Medal, Air Force Meritorious Service Medal w/Oak Leaf Cluster, National Defense Service Medal, Air Force Small Arms Expert Marksmanship Ribbon, Air Force Longevity Service Award

Kevin Ambler (born March 10, 1961) is an American attorney, based in Tampa, Florida, and a former state legislator. He is currently the senior partner at The Ambler Law Group.

Ambler previously served as a Republican member of the Florida House of Representatives from 2002 to 2010, representing the 47th House District, located in the northwest portion of Hillsborough county. During his tenure in the Florida House, Ambler served as chairman of multiple committees, including the Joint Legislative Sunset Advisory Committee, Health Care Appropriations Committee and Public Safety & Domestic Security Policy Committee. Ambler was also Chairman of the Hillsborough County Legislative Delegation.

== Personal life ==
Kevin Ambler was born in Los Angeles, California, and raised in Palm Springs, California. Ambler and his family moved to Florida in 1986 after his transfer to MacDill Air Force Base.

== Political career ==
=== Legislative accomplishments ===
In 2004, Ambler organized a yearly competition for local students from the Tampa Bay area present a legislative proposal to a panel of Hillsborough County legislators. The legislators would choose finalists, and students vote for their favorite bill. Ambler and State Senator Victor Crist would then sponsor chosen bill.

On April 30, 2010, the House and Senate unanimously passed Ambler's House Bill 697, the Entertainment Industry Incentive Bill into legislation.

=== 2010 Florida Senate Primary Election ===
In 2010, Hillsborough County Commissioner Jim Norman filed to run against Ambler in the Florida Senate District 12 Primary Election. Norman had volunteered on Ambler's previous campaigns for the House District 47 seat.

Ambler was endorsed by the Tampa Tribune and the Saint Petersburg Times. On August 24, 2010, Ambler lost to Norman by just under four thousand votes.

=== Electoral history ===
2002 Florida 47th House District Primary Election
Party	Candidate	Votes	%
Republican	Kevin Ambler	3,259	39
Republican	Jill Collins	3,176	37
Republican	Bill Mitchell	1,935	23

2002 Florida 47th House District General Election
Party	Candidate	Votes	%
Republican	Kevin Ambler	26,729	58
Democratic	Michael A. Steinberg	17,782	38
Libertarian	Rob Schwartzberg	1,239	2

2004 Florida 47th House District Primary Election
Party	Candidate	Votes	%
Republican	Kevin Ambler	4,672	50
Republican	Bill Bunkley	4,542	49

2004 Florida 47th House District General Election
Party	Candidate	Votes	%
Republican	Kevin Ambler	42,457	69
Libertarian	Kim Snow	18,927	30

2006 Florida 47th House District General Election
Party	Candidate	Votes	%
Republican	Kevin Ambler	24,837	60
Democratic	Daniel Suarez	16,896	40

== See also ==
- Government of Florida
- Florida State Capitol
- Florida House of Representatives
- Republican Party of Florida
