= Old Folks at Home =

19th century minstrel song by Stephen Foster and Florida state song

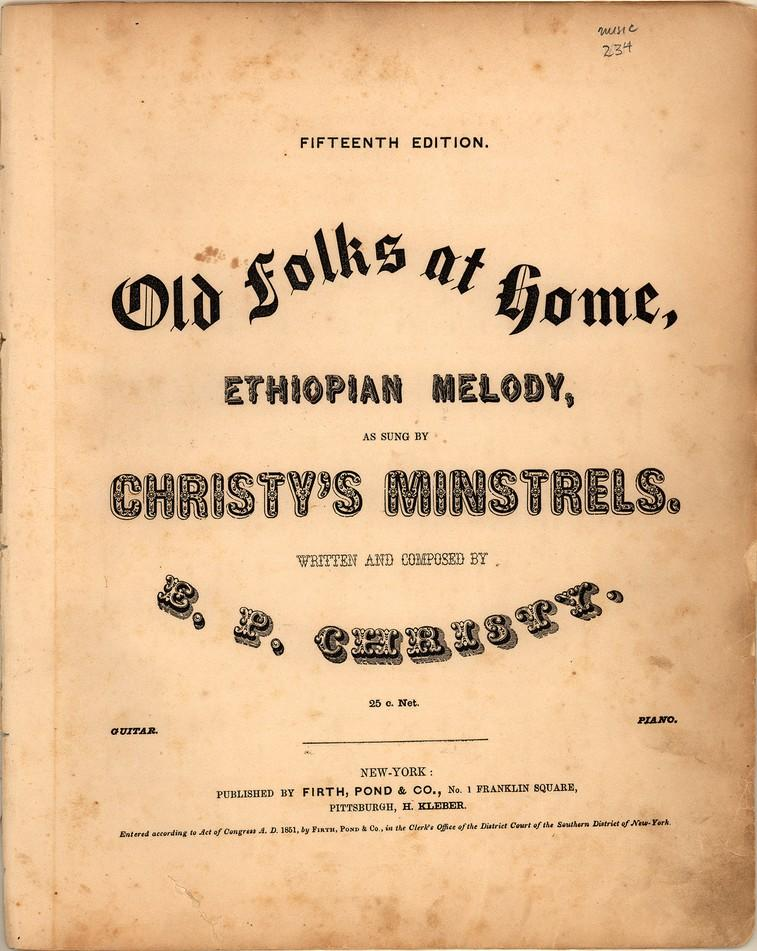
- Regional anthem of Florida
- Lyrics: Stephen Foster, 1851, revised in 2008
- Music: Stephen Foster, 1851
- Published: 1851; 175 years ago by Firth, Pond & Company
- Adopted: 1935; 91 years ago

Audio sample
- "Old Folks at Home" performed by Ernestine Schumann-Heink (1918): file; help

"Old Folks at Home" (also known as "Swanee River") is an American folk song, written as a minstrel song by Stephen Foster in 1851. Since 1935, it has been the official state song of Florida, although in 2008 the original lyrics were revised. It is Roud Folk Song Index no. 13880.

== Composition ==
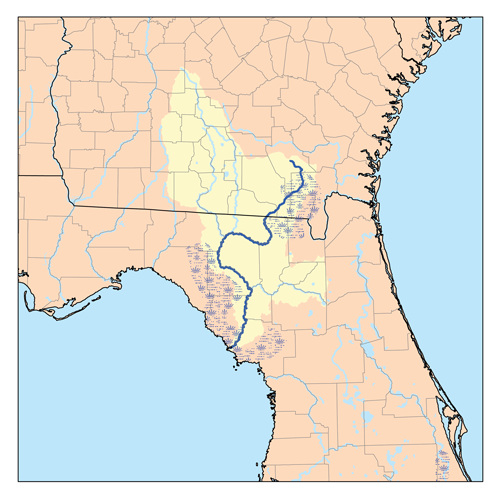
Map of the Suwannee River basin

"Old Folks at Home" was commissioned in 1851 by E. P. Christy for use by Christy's Minstrels, his minstrel troupe. Christy also asked to be credited as the song's creator, and was so credited on early sheet music printings. As a result, while the song was a success, Foster did not directly profit much from it, though he continued to receive royalties for the song.

Foster had composed most of the lyrics but was struggling to name the river of the opening line, and asked his brother, Morrison, to suggest one. Morrison wrote, "One day in 1851, Stephen came into my office, on the bank of the Monongahela, Pittsburgh, and said to me, 'What is a good name of two syllables for a Southern river? I want to use it in this new song of Old Folks at Home.' I asked him how Yazoo would do. 'Oh,' said he, 'that has been used before.' I then suggested Pedee. 'Oh, pshaw,' he replied, 'I won't have that.' I then took down an atlas from the top of my desk and opened the map of the United States. We both looked over it and my finger stopped at the 'Swanee', a little river in Florida emptying into the Gulf of Mexico. 'That's it, that's it exactly,' exclaimed he delighted, as he wrote the name down; and the song was finished, commencing, 'Way Down Upon de Swanee Ribber'. He left the office, as was his custom, abruptly, without saying another word, and I resumed my work." Foster himself never saw the Suwannee River, or even visited Florida, but nevertheless Florida made "Old Folks At Home" its state song in 1935, replacing "Florida, My Florida". Despite the song's popularity during the era, few people outside of Florida actually knew where the Suwannee River was, or that it was even a real place.

Antonín Dvořák's Humoresque No. 7, written in the 1890s, is musically similar and is sometimes played along with "Old Folks at Home". Dvořák also made an arrangement of the song, for baritone, chorus and orchestra, in 1894. The Library of Congress's National Jukebox presents a version with soprano Alma Gluck and violinist Efrem Zimbalist Sr. Jean Arthur and Gary Cooper sing a duet of "Old Folks at Home" combined with Humoresque No. 7 in the 1936 film Mr. Deeds Goes to Town.

== Lyrics revisions ==
Written in the first person from the perspective and in the dialect of an African slave (at a time when slavery was legal in 15 of the states of the US), the song's narrator states "longing for de old plantation", which has been criticized as romanticizing slavery. On the other hand, a longing for the "old folks at home" has sometimes been interpreted, for example, by W. E. B. Du Bois in The Souls of Black Folk (1903), as a longing for the people and traditions of Africa, where most of the human beings enslaved in the New World had been free before they were kidnapped and shipped across the Atlantic Ocean in the Atlantic slave trade. The word, "darkies", used in Foster's lyrics, has been amended; for example, "brothers" was sung in place of "darkies" at the dedication of the new Florida state capitol building in 1978. In general, at public performances another word like "lordy", "mama", "darling", "brothers", "children", or "dear ones" is typically substituted.

In practice, the pronunciation, as written in dialect, has long been disregarded in favor of the corresponding standard American English usage, as demonstrated by the song's performances at the 1955 Florida Folk Festival.

=== State song of Florida ===
As the official state song of Florida, "Old Folks at Home" has traditionally been sung as part of a Florida governor's inauguration ceremony. However, over time, the lyrics were progressively altered to be less offensive; as Diane Roberts observed:

Florida got enlightened in 1978; we substituted "brothers" for "darkies". There were subsequent revisions. At Jeb Bush's second inauguration as governor in 2003, a young black woman gave a moving, nondialect rendition of "Old Folks at Home", except "still longing for the old plantation" came out "still longing for my old connection". Perhaps someone confused Stephen Foster's lyrics with a cell phone commercial.

In his 2007 inauguration ceremony, Charlie Crist decided not to include the state song, but rather to use in its place "The Florida Song", a composition written by black Floridian jazz musician Charles Atkins. Crist then encouraged state Senator Tony Hill, who was the leader of the legislature's Black Caucus, to find a new song. Hill joined forces with state Representative Ed Homan and the Florida Music Education Association to sponsor a contest for a new state song.

On January 11, 2008, the song "Florida (Where the Sawgrass Meets the Sky)" was selected as the winner. The Florida Legislature considered the issue and ultimately adopted it as the state anthem while retaining "Old Folks at Home" as the state song, replacing its original lyrics with a revised version approved by scholars at the Stephen Foster Memorial. Governor Crist stated that he was not pleased by the "two songs" decision; but he signed the bill, creating a new state anthem and establishing the reworded version of the state song by statute, rather than by resolution like the 1935 decision.

== Lyrics ==
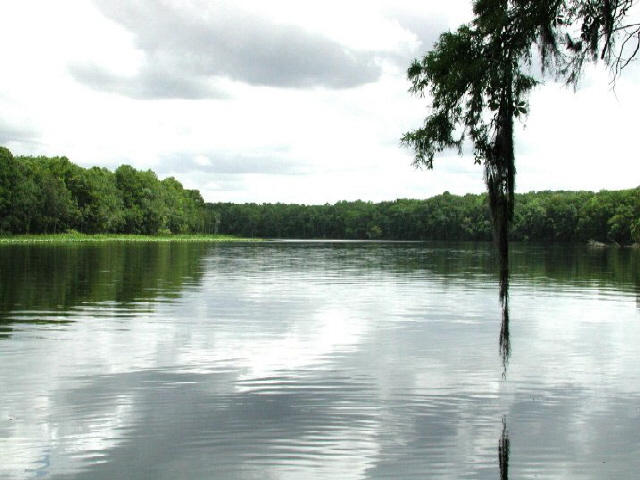
The Suwannee River in Florida

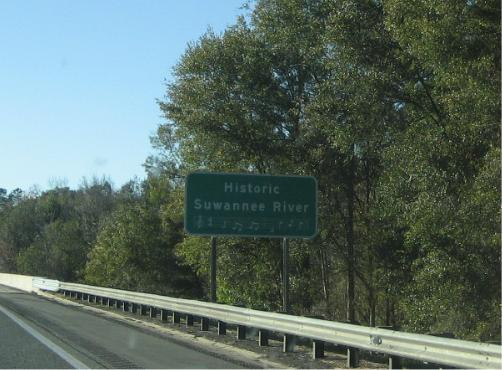
"Historic Suwannee River" sign with the first line of musical notation from "Old Folks at Home" at Interstate 10's westbound crossing of the Suwannee River which has signs in both travel directions. Interstate 75 (not pictured) also has "Old Folks at Home" signage in both directions at its crossing of the Suwannee River.

Original lyrics
by Stephen Foster, 1851

Way down upon de Swanee ribber,
Far, far away,
Dere's wha my heart is turning ebber,
Dere's wha de old folks stay.

All up and down de whole creation
Sadly I roam,
Still longing for de old plantation,
And for de old folks at home.

Chorus
All de world am sad and dreary,
Ebry where I roam;
Oh! darkeys, how my heart grows weary,
Far from de old folks at home!

2nd verse
All round de little farm I wandered
When I was young,
Den many happy days I squandered,
Many de songs I sung.
When I was playing wid my brudder
Happy was I;
Oh! take me to my kind old mudder,
Dere let me live and die.

3rd Verse
One little hut among de bushes,
One dat I love
Still sadly to my memory rushes,
No matter where I rove.
When will I see de bees a-humming
All round de comb?
When will I hear de banjo strumming,
Down in my good old home?

State Song of Florida
as revised in 2008

Way down upon the Suwannee River,
Far, far away,
There's where my heart is turning ever,
There's where the old folks stay.

All up and down the whole creation,
Sadly I roam,
Still longing for my childhood station,
And for the old folks at home.

Chorus
All the world is sad and dreary
Everywhere I roam.
O dear ones, how my heart grows weary,
Far from the old folks at home.

2nd verse
All ‘round the little farm I wander’d,
When I was young;
Then many happy days I squander’d,
Many the songs I sung.
When I was playing with my brother,
Happy was I.
Oh, take me to my kind old mother,
There let me live and die.

3rd Verse
One little hut among the bushes,
One that I love.
Still sadly to my memory rushes,
No matter where I rove.
When will I see the bees a humming,
All ‘round the comb?
When shall I hear the banjo strumming,
Down in my good old home.

== Notable recordings ==
Joel Whitburn identifies early successful recordings by Len Spencer (1892), Vess Ossman (1900), Haydn Quartet (1904), Louise Homer (1905), Alma Gluck (1915), Taylor Trio (1916) and by Oscar Seagle and Columbia Stellar Quartet (1919).

The song enjoyed a revival in the 1930s with versions by Jimmie Lunceford and by Bunny Berigan. Bing Crosby sang the song in the 1935 movie Mississippi and also recorded the song commercially the same year.

Ray Charles used it as an inspiration for his 1957 remake of the song on the Atlantic label, entitled: "Swanee River Rock (Talkin' 'Bout That River)".

Kenny Ball And His Jazzmen recorded a swing version of the song (using only the first verse and chorus twice over and substituting "Lordy" for "darkies") in 1962 for Pye Records. The recording appeared on the B side of their 1963 single "Sukiyaki". Another swing version was recorded by Hugh Laurie (2011).

Tony Sheridan recorded it in 1962 on the Polydor label as a Rock 'n' roll song with his backing band The Beat Brothers issued on his album "My Bonnie". Another version was also done for him that same year by the Beatles but this recording was lost.

The Beach Boys recorded it in 1963 with changed lyrics as "South Bay Surfer", after Brian Wilson had recorded it with The Honeys in yet another iteration, as "Surfin' Down the Swanee River". The Beach Boys would later revisit it as an instrumental intro to "Ol' Man River" during the recording sessions for their 1969 20/20 album, which wouldn't make the final cut.

Larry Groce sang the song on Disney Children's Favorite Songs 2 in 1979, omitting the second verse.

== Other media appearances ==
- 1930 Mammy – sung by minstrel chorus
- 1935 Mississippi – sung by Bing Crosby
- 1936 Mr. Deeds Goes to Town – 1st verse sung by Jean Arthur
- 1939 Swanee River
- 1940 Remember the Night – performed by Fred MacMurray (piano and vocal)
- 1941 Babes on Broadway – Eddie Peabody on banjo, dubbing for Mickey Rooney
- 1941 Nice Girl? – sung by Deanna Durbin
- 1942 The Palm Beach Story – sung by the Ale and Quail Club members
- 1944 Ghost Catchers – danced by the Ghost
- 1947 Road to Rio – a few lines sung by Bing Crosby and Bob Hope
- The song is featured in two 1956 episodes of The Honeymooners TV series. The beginning of Swanee River is played by Ed Norton (on the harmonica) before Ralph's apology in "A Matter of Record" (#1.15). In the episode, "The $99,000 Answer" (#1.19), Norton has a strange habit that before he can play any song, he always plays a few notes of "Old Folks at Home"/"Swanee River" to warm up.
- 1961 The Alvin Show – sung by Alvin and the Chipmunks, originally from the album Sing Again with The Chipmunks.
- 1963 The Jack Benny Program – in Season 13 Episode 20, Jack Benny plays Stephen Foster as he tries to write some of his famous songs. The episode features Connie Francis as Foster's wife, who inadvertently helps Foster break his writer's block by commenting on unusual events around their home. She ends up singing "Old Folks at Home".
- 1982 Grease 2 – An instrumental xylophone version of Swanee River was played by Blanche (Dody Goodman) as the first day of school welcoming jingle, before she was interrupted by Principal McGee (Eve Arden) so she could make the welcoming announcement.
- 1987 Tales of Little Women – sung by the March Sisters (Meg, Jo, Beth, and Amy) for Laurie Lawrence, Anthony Boone, John and Tom Brooke, and near the end of their outdoor picnic.
- 2004 Arrested Development – In Season 1 Episode 9, "Storming the Castle", in the scene prior to the end credits, Tobias had joined a barbershop quartet and they perform the song. Furthermore, in Season 1 Episode 14, "Shock and Aww", an instrumental version of the song, plays over the scene prior to the end credits.
- 2005 Dance Dance Revolution: Mario Mix – The song "Frozen Pipes", used in stage 4-1 of Story Mode, is an instrumental dance arrangement of "Old Folks at Home".
- 2010 Good Luck Charlie – Residents at a nursing home demand Teddy and Ivy to perform the song for them repeatedly.
- 2010 The King's Speech film – Sung a cappella by Lionel Logue (Geoffrey Rush), the speech and language therapist of the future King George VI (Colin Firth), during an impromptu session
- 2018 BlacKkKlansman – An orchestral version of Swanee River plays over a clip from Gone With the Wind during the opening scene.

== See also ==
- List of best-selling sheet music
