= Sara Romeo =

American politician

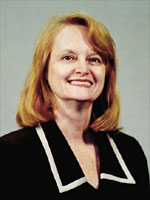

Member of the Florida House of Representatives from the 60th District
- In office November 7, 2000 – November 5, 2002
- Preceded by: Victor Crist
- Succeeded by: Ed Homan

Personal details
- Born: August 23, 1949 (age 76) Galveston, Texas, U.S.
- Party: Democratic
- Children: Walter Dante, Paul Burton, Chloe Ann
- Education: Hillsborough Community College (A.A.); University of South Florida
- Occupation: Nonprofit consultant, grant writer

Sara Romeo is a Democratic politician and nonprofit executive who served as a member of the Florida House of Representatives from 2000 to 2002.

== Education and career ==
Romeo was born in Galveston, Texas, and moved to Florida in 1950. She attended Hillsborough Community College, receiving her associate degree in 1973, and attended the University of South Florida from 1973 to 1975. She operated a furniture store in Ybor City, and served as President of the Ybor City Merchants Association and the Ybor City Chamber of Commerce. In 1999, she became the executive director of Artists Unlimited, an arts nonprofit that ran educational programs and hosted artists.

== Florida House of Representatives ==
In 2000, when Republican State Representative Victor Crist was term-limited, Romeo ran to succeed him in the 60th District, which was based in north Tampa. She won the Democratic nomination unopposed after her only opponent in the race withdrew.

Romeo faced surgeon Ed Homan, the Republican nominee, in the general election. She was endorsed by both the St. Petersburg Times and the Tampa Tribune over Homan. The Times praised both as "thoughtful, active in the community and current on the issues," but noted that "Romeo sees a need for change in Tallahassee on some important issues" while "Homan supports the status quo[.]" It argued that "Romeo offers the most promise" to be the "kind of representative" who would "make every effort to embrace the underclass as well as those who know how to work the political system." The Tribune likewise praised both as "intelligent and well-motivated," but noted that "Romeo looks to be more interested in the many diverse challenges facing Florida," and that her "many years of community service, her energy and her outgoing personality also would likely serve her—and constituents—well in Tallahassee."

On election night, though Homan took an early lead, Romeo ended up narrowly defeating him, winning 50.5 percent of the vote to Homan's 49.5 percent, a margin of 336 votes.

In 2002, Romeo faced a rematch with Homan. Following the 2000 Census, the district was redrawn to remove much of the University of South Florida campus and add in New Tampa to make it more Republican-friendly. She ultimately lost re-election in a landslide, receiving 42 percent of the vote to Homan's 55 percent and Libertarian Ryan Conley's 3 percent.

== Post-legislative career ==
In 2010, Romeo announced that she would run for the Tampa City Council in District 1, but ended her campaign later that year, opting to focus on community serve as executive director of Tampa Crossroads, a nonprofit organization focused on ending veteran homelessness.
