= Mitchell Kaye =

American politician

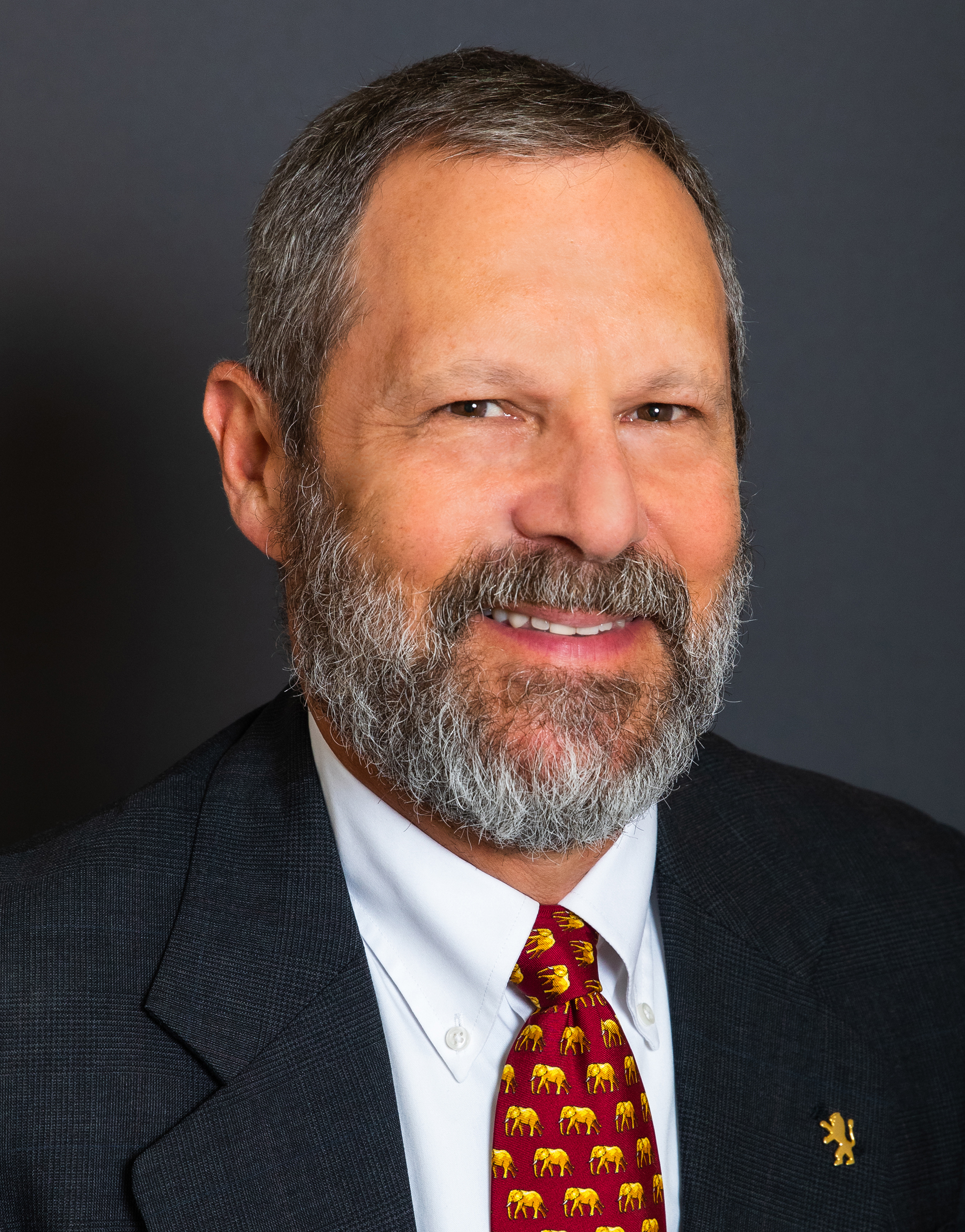

Member of the Georgia House of Representatives
- In office May 17, 2022 – January 9, 2023
- Preceded by: Matt Dollar
- Succeeded by: Sharon Cooper
- Constituency: 45th district
- In office January 11, 1993 – January 13, 2003
- Preceded by: Georganna T. Sinkfield
- Succeeded by: Matt Dollar
- Constituency: 37th district

Personal details
- Born: Mitchell Adam Kaye; December 13, 1957 (age 68)
- Party: Republican
- Education: University of Florida (BA, MBA)

Mitchell Adam Kaye (born December 13, 1957) is an American Republican Party politician in Georgia, United States. He was elected to the Georgia House of Representatives to represent the 37th District of Georgia in 1992. He holds a B.A in economics and an M.B.A. in finance, both from the University of Florida.

In 2022, Kaye returned to the House of Representatives to succeed Matt Dollar, who resigned midway through his term. Kaye was officially sworn into office on May 17, 2022.
