= Georgia's 41st House of Representatives district =

State district in Georgia, USA

Georgia's 41st State House of Representatives district
Representative
Michael Smith; D–Marietta
- Demographics: 27.8% White; 36.9% Black; 30.3% Hispanic; 2.2% Asian
- Population: 59,324

District 41 elects one member of the Georgia House of Representatives. It contains parts of Cobb County.

== Members ==
- Sharon Cooper (2005–2013)
- Michael Smith (since 2013)
