= Brian Rush =

American politician (born 1958)

Member of the Florida House of Representatives from the 47th district
- In office November 4, 1986 – November 8, 1994
- Preceded by: John Grant
- Succeeded by: Rob Wallace

Personal details
- Born: September 11, 1958 (age 67) St. Petersburg, Florida
- Party: Democratic
- Spouse: Margaret Murrell
- Children: 2
- Education: University of Florida (B.A., J.D.)
- Occupation: Attorney

Brian Rush (born September 11, 1958) is an American politician from the state of Florida. A member of the Democratic Party, he served in the Florida House of Representatives from 1987 to 1995.

== Early life and education ==
Rush was born and raised in St. Petersburg, Florida. He attended the University of Florida, graduating with a bachelor’s degree in 1980. Rush graduated from the University of Florida Levin College of Law in 1982.

== Career ==
Rush worked as a trial lawyer in Carrollwood, Florida.

Rush was first elected to the Florida House of Representatives in 1986. He was re-elected three times before losing to Republican Rob Wallace in 1994. He sponsored a bill to reduce class sizes. His focus was on environmental protection and First Amendment rights.

In 2022, Rush was accused of wrongdoing in a 2018 eminent domain case. The Florida Bar alleged that Rush worked against the interests of his client in order to enrich himself, recommending a three-year suspension of Rush's law license. Rush denied wrongdoing and challenged the decision in court. The Florida Supreme Court ruled against Rush in 2023, upholding the three-year suspension. On July 27, 2023, Rush resigned his license to practice law, informing the state Bar that he had closed his law practice.

In 2022, Rush returned to politics by running in that year's U.S. Senate election. He finished second in the Democratic primary with 6.28% of the vote.

Rush has filed to run for U.S. Senate again in the 2024 election.

== Personal life ==
Rush lives in Tampa.
