= Georgia's 45th House of Representatives district =

State district in Georgia, USA

Georgia's 45th State House of Representatives district
Representative
Sharon Cooper; R–Marietta
- Demographics: 75.6% White; 10.5% Black; 5.0% Hispanic; 6.9% Asian
- Population: 55,044

District 45 elects one member of the Georgia House of Representatives. It contains parts of Cobb County.

== Members ==
- Matt Dollar (2005–2022)
- Mitchell Kaye (2022–2023)
- Sharon Cooper (since 2023)
