= John Grant (Florida politician) =

American politician (born 1943)

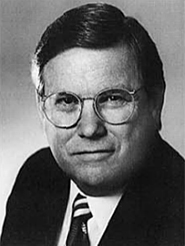

Member of the Florida Senate
- In office November 4, 1986 – November 7, 2000
- Preceded by: Betty Castor
- Succeeded by: Victor Crist
- Constituency: 21st district (1986–1992); 13th district (1992–2000)

Member of the Florida House of Representatives
- In office November 4, 1980 – November 4, 1986
- Preceded by: Malcolm Beard
- Succeeded by: Brian Rush
- Constituency: 64th district (1980–1982); 59th district (1982–1986)

Personal details
- Born: July 12, 1943 (age 83) Tampa, Florida
- Party: Republican
- Spouse: Beverley Code
- Children: 3
- Education: University of Florida; University of South Florida (B.A.); Florida State University (M.S.); Stetson University College of Law (J.D.)
- Occupation: Attorney

John A. Grant Jr. (born July 12, 1943) is an attorney and Republican politician from Florida who served as a member of the Florida House of Representatives from 1980 to 1986 and as a member of the Florida Senate from 1986 to 2000.

Grant was born in Tampa, Florida, in 1943, and graduated from the University of South Florida with his bachelor's degree in 1964. He later graduated from Florida State University with his master's degree in government, and from the Stetson University College of Law with his law degree in 1968.

He served in the Florida House of Representatives from 1980 to 1986, representing the 64th district from 1980 to 1982, and the 59th district from 1982 to 1986. In 1986, Grant was elected to the Florida Senate from the 21st district, succeeding Betty Castor, who was elected Commissioner of Education. Following redistricting in 1992, he was elected to represent the 13th district, and was term-limited in 2000.
