= Traci Koster =

American politician

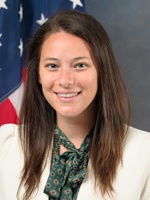

Member of the Florida House of Representatives
- Incumbent
- Assumed office November 3, 2020
- Preceded by: J. W. Grant
- Constituency: 64th district (2020–2022); 66th district (2022–present)

Personal details
- Born: June 15, 1985 (age 41) Greensboro, North Carolina, U.S.
- Party: Republican
- Children: 2
- Education: University of Central Florida (BS); Stetson University (JD)
- Website: Government website

Traci Koster (born June 15, 1985) is an attorney and politician who is the state representative for District 66 in Florida. A Republican, she was elected in 2020 and re-elected in 2022 and 2024. She is running for re-election in 2026. The district covers parts of Hillsborough County and Pinellas County. She was re-elected in 2026.

== Early life and education ==
Born in Greensboro, North Carolina, Koster was raised in Pinellas and Hillsborough County, Florida. She graduated from Tarpon Springs High School. She earned a Bachelor of Science degree in legal studies from the University of Central Florida and a Juris Doctor from the Stetson University College of Law. Koster is a family law attorney.

== Political career ==
When incumbent Republican J. W. Grant resigned from the Florida House after being appointed Florida's chief information officer by Governor Ron DeSantis, Republican leaders in Pinellas and Hillsborough Counties designated Koster as Grant's replacement on the 2020 ballot. In the November general election, Koster defeated Democratic nominee Jessica Harrington.

== Elections ==
2020 Florida's 64th House district General Election
| Party | Candidate | Votes | % |
|---|---|---|---|
| Republican | Traci Koster | 55,874 | 54.1 |
| Democratic | Jessica Harrington | 47,426 | 45.9 |
| Total votes | | 103,300 | 100% |

General election for Florida House of Representatives District 66, 2022
| Party | Candidate | Votes | % |
|---|---|---|---|
| Republican | Traci Koster | 45,305 | 60.1 |
| Democratic | Jessica Harrington | 30,027 | 39.9 |
| Total votes | | 75,332 | 100% |

== Personal life ==
Koster is a Christian.

Florida House of Representatives
| Preceded by J. W. Grant | Member of the Florida House of Representatives from the 64th district 2020–present | Incumbent |
