= Victor Crist =

American politician (born 1957)

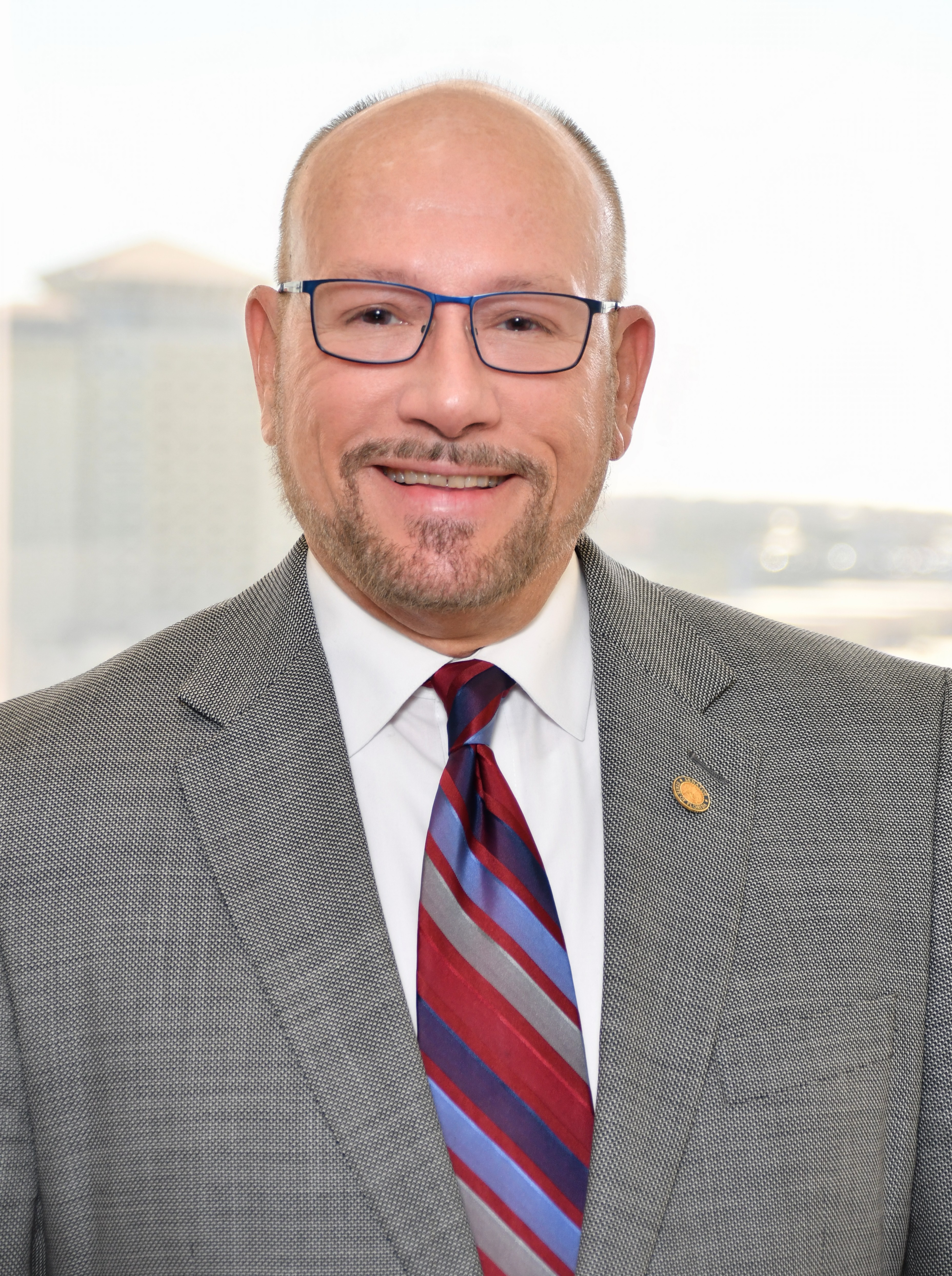

Hillsborough County Clerk of Court and Comptroller
- Incumbent
- Assumed office January 16, 2025
- Preceded by: Cindy Stuart

Member of the Hillsborough County Commission from the 2nd district
- In office November 16, 2010 – November 20, 2018
- Preceded by: Ken Hagan
- Succeeded by: Ken Hagan

Member of the Florida Senate
- In office November 7, 2000 – November 2, 2010
- Preceded by: John Grant
- Succeeded by: Jim Norman
- Constituency: 13th district (2000–2002); 12th district (2002–2010)

Member of the Florida House of Representatives from the 60th district
- In office November 3, 1992 – November 7, 2000
- Preceded by: Mary Figg
- Succeeded by: Sara Romeo

Personal details
- Born: June 21, 1957 (age 69) New Orleans, Louisiana
- Party: Republican
- Spouse: Angela
- Education: St. Petersburg Junior College (A.A.); University of South Florida (B.A.)
- Occupation: Businessman

Victor D. Crist (born June 21, 1957) is a Republican politician from Florida who has served as Hillsborough County Clerk of Court and Comptroller since 2025. He previously served as a member of the Florida House of Representatives from the 60th district from 1992 to 2000 and as a member of the Florida Senate from 2000 to 2010. He later served on the Hillsborough County Commission from 2010 to 2018.

In the Senate, Crist served as Chair of the Senate's Criminal and Civil Justice Appropriations Committee and as Vice Chair of the Senate's Health Policy Committee. Crist has served as an advisor on justice issues to Florida's Attorneys General and Governors.

He started Metropolitan Communications, Inc. in 1983 while still an undergraduate student working through college. In 1997, Crist founded the University Area Community Development Corporation in Tampa. Crist served as chairman of the board and CEO of the organization for its first 16 years.
