= Matt Dollar =

American politician

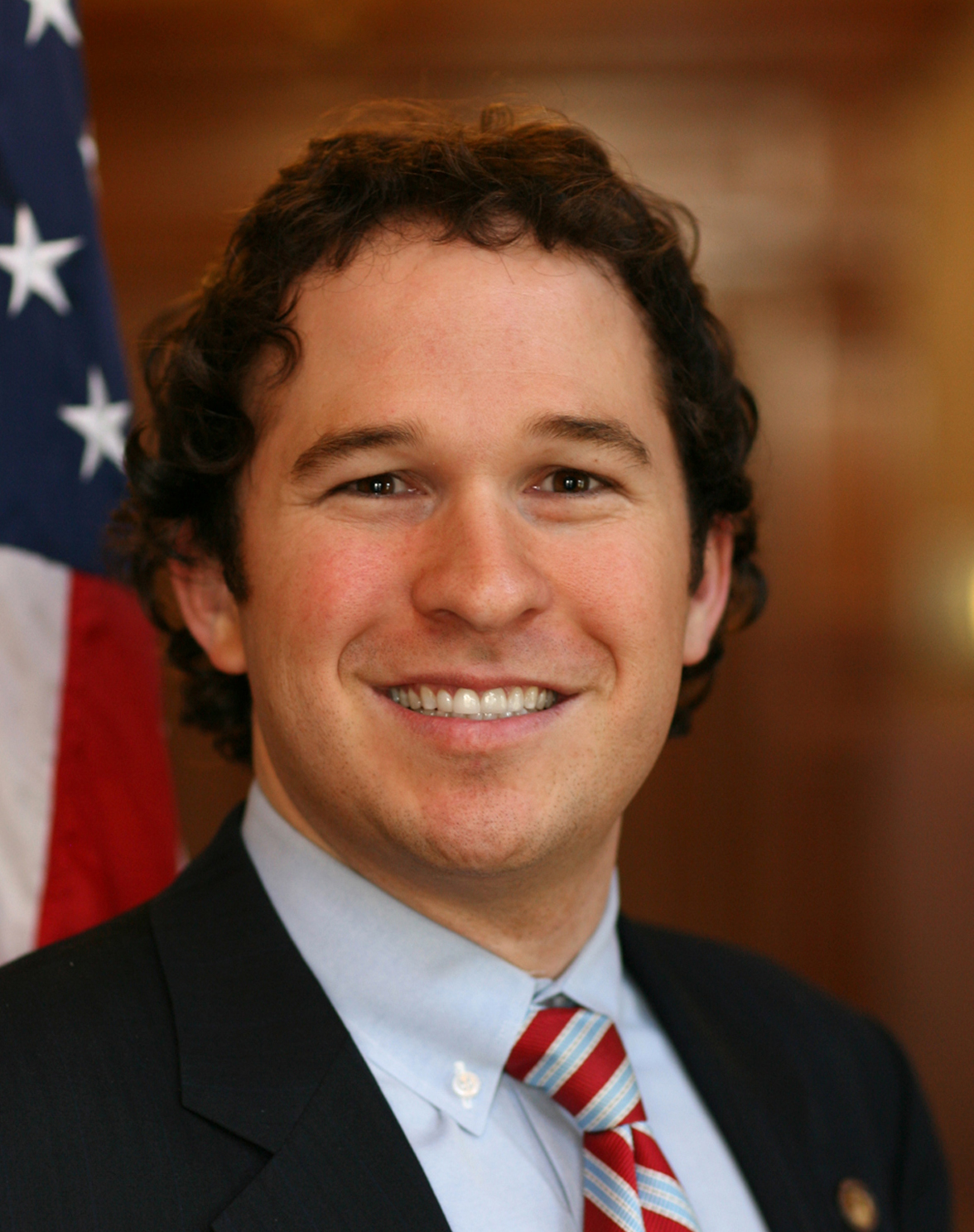

Member of the Georgia House of Representatives
- In office January 13, 2003 – February 1, 2022
- Preceded by: Mitchell Kaye
- Succeeded by: Mitchell Kaye
- Constituency: 31st district (2003–2005); 45th district (2005–2022)

Personal details
- Born: November 30, 1977 (age 48) Atlanta, Georgia, U.S.
- Party: Republican
- Education: University of Georgia
- Website: mattdollar.com

Matthew K. Dollar (born November 30, 1977) is an American politician and a former Republican member of the Georgia House of Representatives representing District 45, which encompasses East Cobb County and Sandy Springs, Georgia. As chairman of the Interstate Cooperation Committee, he is the youngest member in the Georgia legislature's history to be named Chairman. Dollar graduated from University of Georgia.

His occupation is listed as "real estate".

Dollar has served as representative for District 45 since 2003, and faced no opposition to re-election from the Democratic party between 2010 and 2018, when he was challenged by first-time candidate Essence Johnson.

== Voting record ==
In 2019, Dollar sponsored Georgia House Bill 718 to incorporate the City of East Cobb.

In 2019, Dollar voted in favor of Georgia House Bill 481, a heartbeat bill.

In 2018, Dollar voted for cuts to Georgia personal and business tax rates and is quoting as saying: “I have never, and will never, vote for a tax increase.”

In 2017, Dollar sponsored legislation intended to limit annual tuition increases at University System of Georgia (USG) institutions. The bill died in committee. In the same year Dollar sponsored a bill to provide tax benefits on royalty income for musicians, intended to promote the music industry in Georgia. This bill also died in committee.

Georgia House of Representatives
Preceded by Sharon Cooper	Member of the Georgia House of Representatives from the 31st district 2003–2005	Succeeded by Tommy Benton
Preceded by Roger Bruce	Member of the Georgia House of Representatives from the 45th district 2005–2022	Succeeded by Mitchell Kaye
