= J. W. Grant =

Florida State Representative

James "J.W." Grant
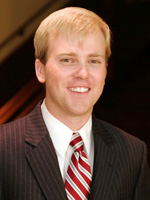

Member of the Florida House of Representatives
- In office April 22, 2015 – August 21, 2020
- Preceded by: Himself
- Succeeded by: Traci Koster
- Constituency: 64th district
- In office November 2, 2010 – November 4, 2014
- Preceded by: Kevin Ambler
- Succeeded by: Himself
- Constituency: 47th district (2010–2012); 64th district (2012–2014)

Personal details
- Born: James William Grant; September 20, 1982 (age 43) Tampa, Florida
- Party: Republican
- Education: Auburn University (BS); Stetson College of Law (JD)
- Profession: Attorney

James William "J.W." Grant (born September 20, 1982) is a Republican politician from Florida. Since August 2020, he has been Florida's chief information officer and director of the Division of State Technology within the state Department of Management Services. Previously, he represented parts of Hillsborough and Pinellas Counties in the Florida House of Representatives from 2010–2014 and 2015–2020.

== Early life and education ==
Grant was born in Tampa, to John A. Grant, Jr., a former member of the Florida House and Florida Senate. He attended Auburn University, from which he graduated with a degree in marketing in 2006. After graduation, Grant was a student at the Stetson College of Law, receiving his J.D. degree in 2009.

== Career ==
=== Florida House of Representatives ===
In 2010, when incumbent State Representative Kevin Ambler could not seek another term in the House due to term limits, Grant ran to succeed him in the 47th District, which included parts of Hillsborough County. In the Republican primary, Grant ran against Hillsborough County Commissioner Brian Blair, Irene Guy, and Tom Aderhold. Grant won with a 37% plurality and moved onto the general election, where he faced the Democratic nominee, former congressional candidate Michael Steinberg. Grant won the general election with 59% of the vote.

In 2012, when Florida House districts were redrawn, Grant opted to run in the newly created 64th District, which included most of the territory he had previously represented, but added parts of Pinellas County. He was unopposed in both the Republican primary and the general election.

While in the legislature, Grant encountered legislation that aimed to prevent abuses at unlicensed religious children's homes, following an investigation that the Tampa Bay Times did that revealed that "virtually anyone can claim a list of religious ideals, take in children and subject them to punishment and isolation that verge on torture--so long as they quote chapter and verse to justify it." After legislation was proposed that would require the Florida Association of Christian Child Caring Agencies (FACCCA) to disclose information about homes that they accredited, Grant authored an amendment that would "remove any new requirements of FACCCA," citing inefficiencies within Florida state government, but the amendment was ultimately unsuccessful.

==== 2015 special election ====
In 2014, Grant ran for re-election, and was opposed by Miriam Steinberg in the Republican primary. While no other candidates had filed to run, because a write-in candidate, Daniel John Matthews, also filed to run for the seat, the primary between Grant and Steinberg was closed to only registered Republicans. Steinberg's husband filed a lawsuit to disqualify Matthews from the ballot, as Matthews did not live in the district at the time of qualifying. The state circuit court removed Matthews from the ballot, opening the Republican primary to all registered voters in the district, invalidating the results of the closed Republican primary that had been held in August, and putting the election on the general election ballot in November. Grant beat Steinberg in the open primary 60–40%. However, an appeals court ruled that Matthews was improperly removed from the ballot, so the Florida House of Representatives voted to invalidate the results and declare the seat vacant.

Governor Rick Scott then called for a special election to be held in the district. Grant, Steinberg, and Matthews all planned to run in the special election, but Steinberg refused to pay the qualifying fee for the special election, as she claimed that the qualifying fee that she paid for the invalidated election should have transferred. As a result, Steinberg did not qualify and Grant won the Republican primary unopposed. The Tampa Tribune criticized the complex legal situation that caused the special election to occur, and called Matthews' candidacy "a sham and affront to our electoral process," and ultimately endorsed Grant, praising him for representing the district well. Ultimately, Grant defeated Matthews with 91% of the vote.

During the campaign, speculation abounded that Grant, who ordinarily would have been term-limited in 2018 had the 2014 general election results been valid, would be able to run for re-election until 2024 under the state's term limits laws, and that Grant would be an attractive candidate for Speaker of the Florida House of Representatives for the 2022-2024 legislative term. Grant refused to address the speculation, noting, "My focus is on getting re-elected. Anything else is a distraction.".

=== Caresync Scandal ===
While serving as a member of the Florida House of Representatives, Grant became the subject of numerous articles in the Tampa Bay Times and other media pertaining to his ownership interest in Caresync, a privately held firm established in Hardee County, Florida in conjunction with the Hardee County Industrial Development agency.

Caresync abruptly shut down in June 2018 just days after an "angel investor" had previously announced to employees that a deal had been made to insure the ongoing operations of the company, thereby resulting in the immediate layoff of nearly 300 employees.

The $7.25 million transaction was also the subject of a Grand Jury investigation . At the time that Caresync ceased operations Grant was already separated from the company, stating in the media that he was the victim of a "hostile takeover".

=== Chief information officer ===
In August 2020, Grant resigned from the House and withdrew from his reelection to take a job as Florida's chief information officer and director of the Division of State Technology within the state Department of Management Services. As a legislator, Grant had sponsored a 2020 law reorganizing the Division of State Technology and eliminating some of the qualifications that the chief information officer was required to have, effectively allowing Grant to now be "qualified" under Florida law to be eligible to be appointed to the position. Grant has denied that he crafted the legislation to create a job for himself.

Florida House of Representatives
Preceded by Kevin Ambler	Member of the Florida House of Representatives from the 47th district 2010–2012	Succeeded by Linda Stewart
Preceded by Kelli Stargel	Member of the Florida House of Representatives from the 64th district 2012–2014	Succeeded by Himself
Preceded by Himself	Member of the Florida House of Representatives from the 64th district 2015–2020	Succeeded by Traci Koster
