= Michael Smith (Georgia politician) =

American politician

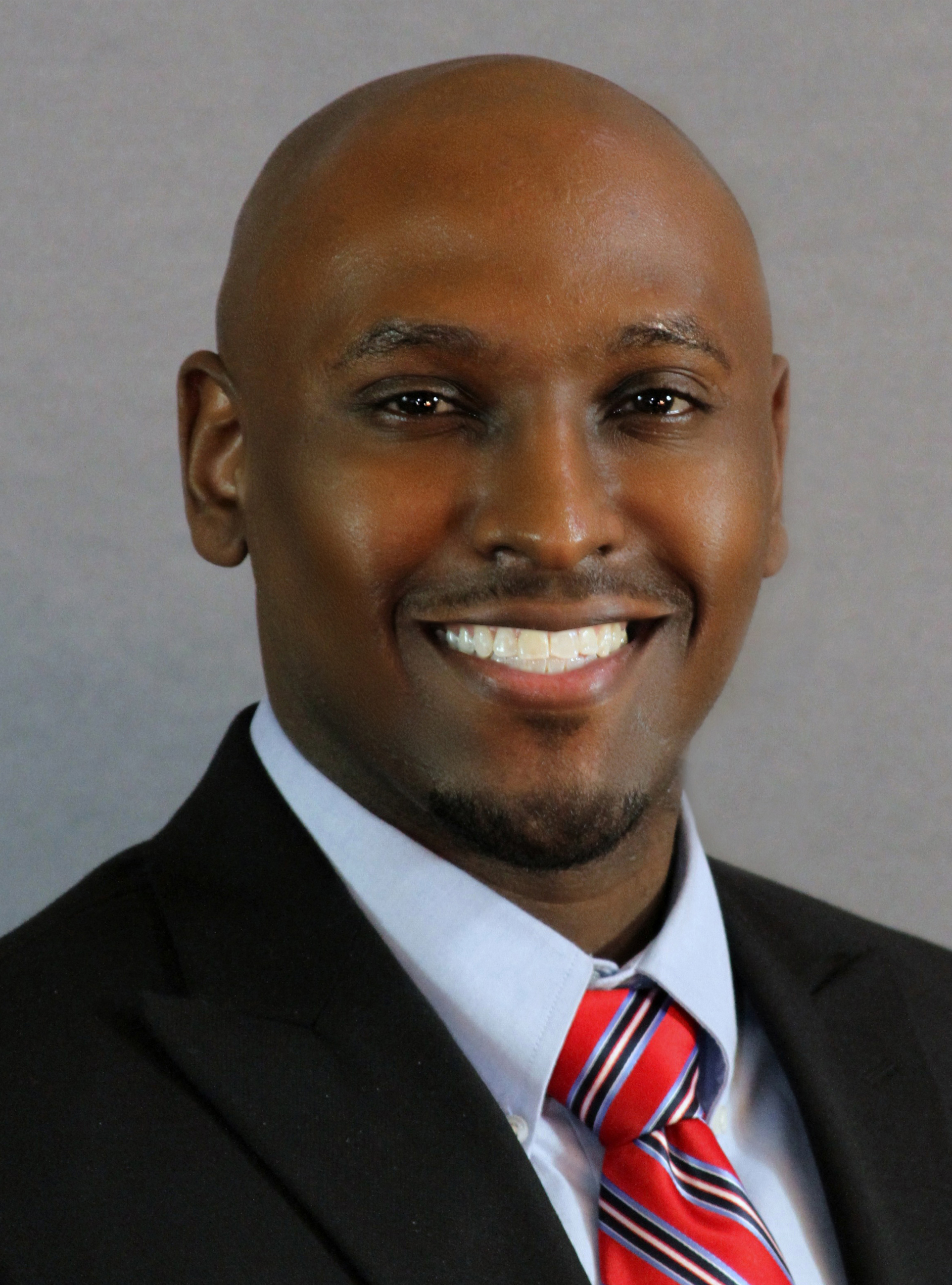
- Official portrait, 2025

Member of the Georgia House of Representatives from the 41st district
- Incumbent
- Assumed office January 14, 2013
- Preceded by: Bobby Franklin (redistricting)

Personal details
- Born: November 3, 1983 (age 42) Austell, Georgia, U.S.
- Party: Democratic
- Spouse: Ryisha
- Education: Kennesaw State University
- Occupation: Realtor

Michael Andre Smith II (born November 3, 1983) is an American politician. He is a Democrat representing District 41 in the Georgia House of Representatives.

== Political career ==
Smith was first elected to represent the 41st district in the Georgia House of Representatives in 2012. He has been re-elected to that position three times, and is running again in 2020.

Smith currently sits on the following committees:

- Code Revision
- Interstate Cooperation
- Regulated Industries
- Science and Technology
- Special Committee on Economic Growth
- Special Rules
- State Properties

=== Electoral record ===
2012 Democratic primary: Georgia House of Representatives, District 41
Party	Candidate	Votes	%
Democratic	Michael Smith	1,073	41.8%
Democratic	Diana Eckles	886	34.5%
Democratic	Justin O'Dell	608	23.7%

2012 Democratic primary runoff: Georgia House of Representatives, District 41
Party	Candidate	Votes	%
Democratic	Michael Smith	577	61.32%
Democratic	Diana Eckles	364	38.68%

2012 general election: Georgia House of Representatives, District 41
Party	Candidate	Votes	%
Democratic	Michael Smith	10,073	64%
Republican	Phil Daniell	5,661	36%

In 2014 and 2016, Smith was unopposed in the primary and general elections.

In 2018, Smith was unopposed in the Democratic primary.

2018 general election: Georgia House of Representatives, District 41
Party	Candidate	Votes	%
Democratic	Michael Smith	11,673	70.6%
Republican	Deanna Harris	4,858	29.4%
