= Florida, My Florida =

Former state song of Florida

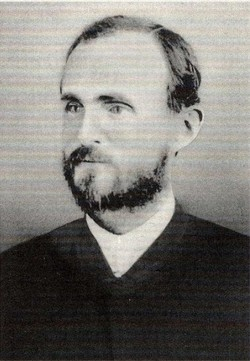
- Chastain V. Waugh, writer of "Florida, My Florida"
- Regional anthem of Florida
- Lyrics: Chastain V. Waugh, 1894
- Music: Lauriger Horatius
- Published: 1894; 131 years ago
- Adopted: 1913; 112 years ago
- Relinquished: 1935; 90 years ago
- Succeeded by: Swannee River

"Florida, My Florida" was the state song of the state of Florida from 1913 to 1935. It was written by the Reverend Chastain V. Waugh, professor of ancient and modern languages at the University of Florida, in 1894.

== Background ==
In 1893, the Reverend Waugh took a position at the Florida Agricultural and Mechanical College in Lake City, Florida (which became the University of Florida in 1906), as professor of ancient and modern languages. In 1894, Waugh wrote "Florida, My Florida". The song extolled the virtues of the state from "sunkissed land," the "Gulf and Ocean grand," the "golden fruit,' and the "gardens" to the state's "phosphate mines," which were important to the wealth and economic health of citizens of Florida. It was sung to the tune of the German Christmas song "O Tannenbaum" (Oh, Christmas Tree) and became a mainstay in many public school activities.

Florida, which became a state in 1845, did not have a state song until 1913. On May 12, 1913, Florida Governor Park Trammell signed House Concurrent Resolution No. 24, which designated "Florida, My Florida" as the state song (and included its lyrics). The song’s tune, O Tannenbaum, was also used for the official state songs of Maryland ("Maryland, My Maryland") and Iowa ("The Song of Iowa"), and for the unofficial state song of Michigan ("Michigan, My Michigan"). In 1935, the Florida Legislature changed the state song to "Swannee River" [sic]. In 2008, the Legislature designated that a revised version of the lyrics be the official version of the state song and it designated "Florida, Where the Sawgrass Meets the Sky" as the state anthem.

== Lyrics ==
Land of my birth, bright sunkissed land,
Florida, my Florida,
Laved by the Gulf and Ocean grand,
Florida, my Florida,
Of all the States in East or West,
Unto my heart thou art the best; Here may I live, here may I rest,
Florida, my Florida.

In country, town or hills and dells,
Florida, my Florida,
The rhythmic chimes of they school bells
Florida my Florida
Will call thy children day by day
To learn to walk the patriot's way,
Firmly to stand for thee for aye,
Florida, my Florida.

Thy golden fruit the world outshines
Florida, my Florida,
They gardens and thy phosphate mines,
Florida, my Florida,
Yield their rich store of good supply,
To still the voice of hunger's cry,—
For thee we'll live, for thee we'll die,
Florida, my Florida.

Th' oppressors rod can't rest on thee,
Florida, my Florida,
Thy sons and daughters free must be,
Florida, my Florida.
From North and South, from East and West,
From freezing blasts they come for rest,
And find in thee their earnest quest,
Florida, my Florida.

When ills betide and woes o'ertake,
Florida, my Florida,
Thy sons and daughters quick will make,—
Florida, my Florida.
The sacrifice of loves and life
To save from woe, from ills and strife,
To fell thy foes in danger rife,
Florida, my Florida.
