= Mary Figg =

American politician

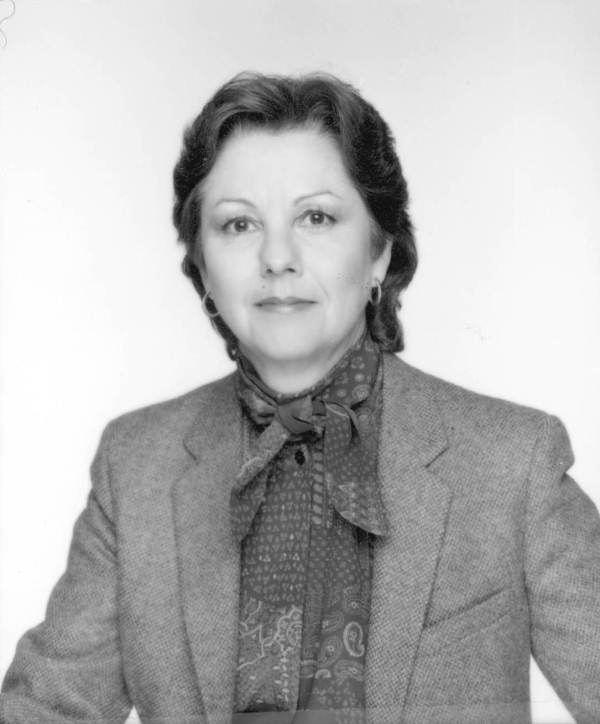

Member of the Florida House of Representatives from the 60th district
- In office 1982–1992

Personal details
- Born: September 25, 1934 (age 92) Birmingham, Alabama, U.S.
- Party: Democratic
- Spouse: Robert M. Figg III
- Children: three
- Education: University of South Florida, Florida State University
- Occupation: attorney, judge

Mary Figg (born September 25, 1934) is a politician in the American state of Florida. She served in the Florida House of Representatives from 1982 to 1992, representing the 60th district.
