= Danny L. Diaz =

Danny Lopez Diaz (born 1975) is a national communications consultant and political strategist for candidates of the Republican Party. In June 2015, he was named the campaign manager for Jeb Bush for President. He is a founding partner of FP1 Strategies LLC, a public affairs, media relations, digital communications and advertising firm based in Washington, D.C. Diaz’s corporate efforts have included transportation, health care, retail and education issues.

== Life before politics ==
A native of Washington, D.C., Diaz attended George Mason University, working his way through college part-time as a plumber. He graduated with a B.A. in Communications.

Before joining politics, Diaz was a public relations account executive at The Bomstein Agency and an associate with RMR & Associates.

During the 2002 election cycle, Diaz was deputy press secretary for the National Republican Congressional Committee.

== Political career ==
Diaz first rose to some prominence in 2004, when he served as the oft-quoted southwest regional press secretary for Bush-Cheney ’04, managing press in nine states eventually won by the GOP ticket. He was also a member of its National Hispanic Working Group. By that December, he had been hired as deputy communications director at the Republican National Committee (RNC), where he worked through the 2005-06 election cycle. He helped to develop a media plan to advance the nominations of John Roberts and Samuel Alito to the U.S. Supreme Court, in addition to managing the committee’s independent expenditure program. It was also reported in 2006 that Diaz “handled Hispanic outreach for the Party.”

Beginning in January 2007, he served as deputy communications director for John McCain’s 2008 campaign, where he worked closely with Terry Nelson, later a founding partner at FP1 Strategies. However, Diaz, Nelson and dozens of staffers left the McCain committee after a July 2007 staff shakeup.

Subsequently, in September 2007, Diaz returned to the committee and served as RNC Communications Director for the 2008 election cycle. His duties included managing the national party’s press, research and e-campaign operations, including specialty, regional, broadcast and online media.

Diaz established his own firm, Diaz Communications LLC, in 2009, which served as his base of operations before the 2011 founding of FP1 Strategies.

In 2010, Diaz worked as a lead consultant on Mark Kirk for U.S. Senate (in Illinois) and Susana Martinez for Governor (in New Mexico), both of whom were successful. He also served as spokesman for Martinez’s Transition Team.

During the 2012 presidential cycle, after staying neutral in the primaries, Diaz served as a senior advisor to Governor Mitt Romney’s losing general-election campaign.

In 2013, Diaz served as a senior consultant to Attorney General Ken Cuccinelli in his unsuccessful campaign for Virginia governor.

In 2014, Diaz served as the general consultant in Doug Ducey’s campaign for governor of Arizona, as well as once again serving as a senior advisor to New Mexico Governor Susana Martinez.

In 2015, Diaz served as a consultant to Bush’s Right to Rise PAC prior to being named as Campaign Manager. “Danny's skill at rapidly moving content and campaign organization makes him perfectly suited for running the day-to-day operations," said Bush senior adviser Sally Bradshaw.

Of Diaz, the Washington Post's Chris Cillizza wrote, "Diaz is a rapid-response/opposition research maestro. Diaz has made his name in Republican circles by being the guy who not only consumed more information on a daily basis than anyone else in the game but also was able to spray out relevant articles at a machine-gun pace to reporters."

He has long advocated aggressive, positive outreach by Republicans to Hispanics. In 2006, he told the Roll Call newspaper, "[Latinos are] a group of people we believe we can identify with, we have shared values." As for immigration specifically, He said Hispanics will appreciate the party's willingness to engage in debate about the difficult issue. "We recognized that this is something that needs to be tackled," Diaz said. "We are all on the same plane. ... We all share concerns."

== Personal life ==
Diaz resides in Northern Virginia with his wife, three daughters and a son. Diaz is of Spanish descent.
