= Florida Citrus Archives =

The Florida Citrus Archives are designated by law as the official citrus archive of Florida.

The designation occurred in 2001. The Senate bill analysis stated "Florida Southern College in Lakeland has accumulated and maintains an extensive collection of citrus related materials. The collection is called The Florida Citrus Archives and is dedicated to Thomas B. Mack, the person most responsible for the success of the project. Florida Citrus Mutual, an association representing growers statewide, maintains that The Florida Citrus Archives are the largest collection of its kind by far and that they function now as the unofficial statewide citrus archives."

The Florida Citrus Archives left Callahan Court in 2005, and moved to the Sarah D. and L. Kirk McKay, Jr. Archives Center in 2009 when it was dedicated. The Archives house a collection of citrus labels from the 20th century, most of which were donated by James Ellis.

== Professor Thomas B. Mack ==
Professor Thomas B. Mack was an avid collector of information on citrus. As he wrote hundreds of articles on citrus, more and more people contributed to his store of information. In 1988, Florida Southern College devoted a special room in the Jack Berry Citrus Building to Professor Mack's collection, and an archivist to manage it. His intent was to create an open source of information for the citrus industry.

In 1997, Professor Mack was inducted to the Florida Citrus Hall of Fame as "an integral member of Florida's Citrus community for over half a century." Professor Mack wrote a column called "Citrifacts" on various citrus-related trivia that earned him the nickname "Mr. Citrifacts." His columns were eventually compiled into the books "Citrifacts I" and "Citrifacts II," with the proceeds from sales going to benefit Florida Southern College.
