= John Legg (politician) =

American politician

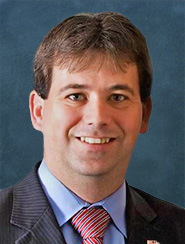

Superintendent of Schools of Pasco County, Florida
- Incumbent
- Assumed office November 19, 2024
- Preceded by: Kurt S. Browning

Speaker Pro Tempore of the Florida House of Representatives
- In office November 16, 2010 – November 20, 2012
- Preceded by: Ronald Regan
- Succeeded by: Marti Coley

Member of the Florida Senate from the 17th district
- In office November 20, 2012 – November 8, 2016
- Preceded by: Jim Norman (redistricting)

Member of the Florida House of Representatives from the 46th district
- In office November 16, 2004 – November 20, 2012
- Preceded by: Heather Fiorentino
- Succeeded by: Bruce Antone

Personal details
- Born: April 29, 1975 (age 51) Brooksville, Florida
- Party: Republican
- Education: Pasco–Hernando Community College (A.A.); University of South Florida (B.A.) (M.P.A.)
- Profession: Administrator/educator

John Legg (born April 29, 1975) is Superintendent of Schools for Pasco County Schools in Pasco County, Florida. A member of the Republican Party, he served as a member of the Florida Senate, representing the 17th District, which includes Tampa and Zephyrhills in northwestern Hillsborough County and southern Pasco County. Prior to his election to the Senate, he served as a member of the Florida House of Representatives, representing the 46th District.

== Education ==
Legg was born in Brooksville and attended Pasco–Hernando Community College, receiving his associate degree in 1994, and then the University of South Florida, receiving a degree in social work in 1995. He then continued his studies at the University of Florida earning a Master of Public Administration (MPA) in 1995. In 2016, Legg returned to the University of South Florida to earn a Doctorate of Education (EdD) in Program Development and Innovation.

== Charter school operator ==
Legg was a founding member of the Dayspring Academy Charter School, a Pasco County-based charter school, in 2000, where he served as Chief Financial Officer Operations.

== Political career ==
In 1998, Legg began working for State Representative Heather Fiorentino as her staff director, a position he would hold until 2001.

In 2002, Republican State Representative Mike Fasano was unable to seek re-election due to term limits. Legg ran to succeed him in the 45th District, which stretched from Dunedin to New Port Richey in Pasco County and Pinellas County. Legg faced Tom Anderson, the Mayor of Dunedin, in the Republican primary. Anderson ended up defeating Legg by a wide margin, winning 55% of the vote to Legg's 45%.

=== Florida House of Representatives ===
When State Representative Heather Fiorentino opted to run for Pasco County Superintendent of Schools instead of seeking re-election, Legg ran to succeed her in the 46th District, which stretched from New Port Richey to Shady Hills in western Pasco County. Legg faced attorney John Stewart in the Republican primary, and campaigned on his promise to "protect life and the sanctity of marriage" and his support for improving the quality of public education, while Stewart focused on environmental protection and limiting medical malpractice lawsuits. During the campaign, Stewart was attacked by a third-party group for allegedly supporting drivers licenses for undocumented immigrants and for opposing then-Governor Jeb Bush's education reforms, an attack that Stewart denounced and that Legg said he did not support. Legg ended up winning the nomination, receiving 54% of the vote to Stewart's 46%, and advanced to the general election, where he faced Dee Thomas, a physical therapist and the Democratic nominee. The Florida Democratic Party and the Republican Party of Florida both heavily invested in the race, given that the Republicans' two-thirds majority in the state House was at risk. Despite the fact that the district voted for Al Gore in the 2000 presidential election, Legg defeated Thomas by a wide margin, winning 56% of the vote to her 44%.

Legg was re-elected unopposed in 2006. In 2008, he faced Ron Rice, a land surveyor for the city of Clearwater and the Democratic nominee, and John Ubele, a member of a white nationalist organization and an independent candidate. During the campaign, Legg faced a minor scandal when it was discovered that Legg maintained two residences, one inside the district and one outside the district, where he lived with his new wife. Given that legislators are required to live in the districts they represent, Rice noted, "It seems to me as if Mr. Legg is having a difficult time choosing between his family and his political career." The Tampa Bay Times endorsed Legg for re-election, praising him as a "strong supporter for consumers and senior citizens," and noting that while Rice was "an affable advocate for the working class," his experience was less significant than Legg's. Ultimately, Legg was re-elected to a third term in a landslide over his opponents, receiving 58% of the vote to Rice's 39% and Ubele's 3%. Legg was re-elected to his fourth and final term unopposed in 2010.

=== Florida Senate ===
In 2012, following the reconfiguration of the state's legislative districts, Legg, unable to seek a fifth term in the House due to term limits, opted to run for the Florida Senate. He was initially planning on running in the 18th District, and would have faced wealthy egg farmer Wilton Simpson in the primary. Legg ended up withdrawing from the 18th District, however, instead opting to run in the 17th District, challenging Republican State Senator Jim Norman in the primary. Norman, however, ultimately ended up declining to seek another term, and Legg ended up facing former State Representative Rob Wallace and security consultant John Korsak in the primary. The Tampa Bay Times endorsed Legg, citing his "ability to develop a consensus" to address problems, though noting that he shaped education policy, "both good and bad," pushing "controversial bills." Legg ended up defeating Wallace and Korsak by a wide margin, winning 62% of the vote to Wallace's 23% and Korsak's 15%. He advanced to the general election, where he was elected unopposed.

In 2015, litigation concerning Florida Senate maps was resolved with an admission by the Senate that the maps violated the Fair Districts provision of the Constitution of Florida. Following the inability of the legislature to create and pass new maps into law, the Florida Supreme Court selected maps drawn by the League of Women Voters of Florida. Consequently, Legg was drawn into the 10th District, where Wilton Simpson, the Senate President-designate for the 2018-2020 term, is seeking re-election. He ultimately declined to run for re-election to a second term in 2016. He was considering running for the Senate in 2018 to replace term-limited Senator Jack Latvala, but later changed his mind stating, “After 12 years my family and I need a break”.

=== Superintendent of Schools ===
On June 3, 2022, Legg announced his candidacy for Pasco County Schools Superintendent. He won the election on November 5, 2024 and became Superintendent on November 19, 2024.
