= Jim Norman (politician) =

American politician

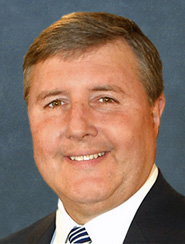
- Jim Norman

Member of the Florida Senate from the 12 district
- In office 2010–2012
- Preceded by: Victor Crist
- Succeeded by: John Legg (redistricting)

Personal details
- Party: Republican
- Spouse: Mearline Norman

Jim Norman is a former Republican member of the Florida Senate from 2010 to 2012, representing the 12th District, which included a portion of Hillsborough county and all of Pasco county.

== Political career ==
=== 2010 Florida Senate Primary Election ===
In 2010, Hillsborough County Commissioner Jim Norman filed to run against Kevin Ambler in the Senate District 12 Primary Election. Norman had volunteered on Ambler's previous campaigns for the House District 47 seat. During the campaign, Ambler sued Norman for not disclosing a US$435,000 Arkansas vacation home purchased by his wife, using money from a conservative activist, Ralph Hughes. Norman was removed from the ballot by the court and replaced by former state representative Rob Wallace. After appeal, Norman was reinstated.

During the election, Norman was defended by the Salvation Army. Norman, an employee of the charity, was paid $95,000 a year and provided with a car. Due to the FBI investigation and criticism from donors, the charity announced that they would be "waiting to see what happens in the appeal or the election" before discussing Norman's employment.

Ethics complaints were filed against Norman by Tampa attorney Paul Phillips.

On August 24, 2010, Norman defeated Ambler.

The federal investigation of Norman was dropped in 2011.

=== 2012 Primary Election ===
Norman filed for reelection in 2012 for Florida Senate District 17, following redistricting, but withdrew a week later.

=== 2016 Primary Election ===
Jim Norman attempted to rejoin the Hillsborough County Commission in 2016, but was defeated by Tim Schock in the Primary Election.

== Electoral history ==
2010 Florida 12th Senate District Primary Election
Party	Candidate	Votes	%
Republican	Jim Norman	18,587	56
Republican	Kevin Ambler	14,629	44
