= Ed Homan =

American physician and politician

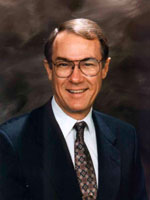

Member of the Florida House of Representatives from the 60th District
- In office November 5, 2002 – November 2, 2010
- Preceded by: Sara Romeo
- Succeeded by: Shawn Harrison

Personal details
- Born: August 10, 1943 (age 82); Oklahoma City, Oklahoma, U.S.
- Political party: Republican
- Children: John, David, Mark
- Education: Louisiana State University (B.S.); LSU Health Sciences Center New Orleans (M.D.)
- Occupation: Orthopedic surgeon

Ed Homan is a Florida physician and Republican politician who serves as the District 60 Representative in the House of Representatives of the U.S. state of Florida. He is married to Carol Hodges and has three children, David, John, and Mark. He was first elected to the Florida House in 2002, and was successively re-elected thereafter.

Homan was born in Oklahoma City, Oklahoma on August 10, 1943. In 1964, he received a Bachelor of Science in Biochemistry from Louisiana State University in 1964, and four years later received his Doctorate in Medicine. He served his residency at Charity Hospital in New Orleans, Louisiana He served two years in the United States Navy from 1970 to 1972. He moved to Florida in 1975. From 1999 to 2000, he served as president of the Hillsborough County Medical Association. He lives in Tampa, Florida and works as an orthopedic surgeon. He is an assistant professor at the University of South Florida's medical school.

== Sources ==
- Florida House of Representatives Profile
- Project Vote Smart profile
- Follow the money page
