= Florida Music Education Association =

American music education organization

- Abbreviation: FMEA
- Formation: 1944; 82 years ago
- Type: 501(c)(3) organization
- Tax ID no.: EIN 590791022
- Legal status: Active
- Purpose: Music education in Florida
- Headquarters: Tallahassee, Florida
- President: Harry "Skip" Pardee, Ed.D.
- Executive Director: Kathleen D. Sanz
- Affiliations: NAfME
- Website: fmea.org
- Formerly called: Florida Music Educators Association

The Florida Music Education Association (FMEA) is a non-profit umbrella association of music education groups in Florida that sets standards for the state in music education, provides continuing education and training opportunities to music educators in the state. FMEA is a federated state unit of the National Association for Music Education. FMEA was founded in 1944 during a three way clinic between the Florida Vocal Association, the Florida Orchestra Association, and the Florida Bandmasters Association.

With the University of Florida, FMEA publishes Research Perspectives in Music Education, its official research journal.

== Annual Professional Development Conference ==
The FMEA hosts an annual conference at the Tampa Convention Center each January that includes continuing education seminars, a trade show, organizational meetings, and rehearsals and performances of the Florida All-State bands, choruses, and orchestras.

=== Trade show ===
The annual trade show at the FMEA Tampa meeting is one of the largest in the state, bringing music publishing, equipment manufacturers, software companies, group travel companies, fundraising organizations, and major college and university recruiting programs to their members, the members of the organizations of FMEA, and the students attending the event for performances.

=== All-State & Honors ensembles ===
Each year the FMEA is the host organization that sponsors the Florida All-State bands, orchestras, and choirs. Audition music is selected and sent to schools all over the state. Students prepare and then audition, usually at the beginning of the academic school year in their county, by making a blind-audition recording. The recordings are distributed to expert faculty who review the recordings and score them. The top students in the state are then selected to perform at the FMEA's annual convention in Tampa.

- Florida All-State Bands - Students from concert bands around the state are selected to perform in this ensemble of 90–110 players of brass, woodwind, and percussive instruments. The Middle School band consists of 7th & 8th graders, the Concert Band consists of 9th and 10th graders, and the Symphonic Band consists of 11th & 12th graders.
- Florida All-State Orchestras - Students who play stringed instruments and classical brass and woodwind instruments from around the state are selected to perform in this ensemble of 60–70 students. The Middle School Orchestra consists of 7th & 8th graders, the Concert Orchestra consists of 9th and 10th graders, and the Symphonic Orchestra consists of 11th & 12th graders.
- Florida All-State Jazz Bands - 17–18 jazz students from around the State of Florida are selected to play in a big band. The Middle School Jazz Band consists of 7th & 8th graders, and the High School Jazz Band consists of 9th & 10th graders.
- Florida All-State Choruses - Each chorus consists of students from school choral programs from throughout the state of Florida. The various choirs include Middle School Treble Chorus, Middle School Mixed Chorus, High School Concert Chorus, High School TTBB Chorus, High School SSAA Chorus, and a High School Reading Chorus.
- Florida All-State Guitar Ensemble - 40–45 guitar students from around the State of Florida are selected to perform a variety of classical guitar repertoire.
- Florida Popular Music Collective - a small group of around 9 to 11 students who perform popular music, mostly original music created by the students. It is run using a learner-centered pedagogical approach where the students have significant autonomy over the choice of literature performed.
- Honors Bands and Orchestras - Honors Bands and Orchestras consist of students from concert bands and orchestras around the state. They differ from the All-State ensembles in that the students are nominated by their directors instead of performing an audition.
