= Arkansas Traveler =

Arkansas Traveler or Arkansas Traveller may refer to:

- Arkansas Traveler (folklore), a figure of 19th-century American folklore said to have originated with Sandford C. Faulkner

== Music ==
- Arkansas Traveler (album), a 1992 album by Michelle Shocked
- Arkansas Traveler, a 1987 album by the Breetles
- Original Arkansas Traveler Part 1 and Part 2, by Dan Hornsby, 1928
- "The Arkansas Traveler" (song), a mid-19th century fiddle tune by Mose Case
- "Arkansaw Traveler", a 1922 song by Eck Robertson and Henry C. Gilliland

== Other titled works ==
- The Arkansas Traveler (film), a 1938 American comedy film
- The Arkansas Traveler, an 1856 painting by Edward Payson Washbourne
- The Arkansas Traveler (newspaper), student newspaper of the University of Arkansas
- Arkansas Traveler (radio show), a bluegrass program on WDET, Detroit, Michigan
- Arkansas Traveler (web series), a 2017 western web series
- The Arkansas Traveler, the original title of The Bob Burns Show

== Other uses ==
- Arkansas Traveler (honorary title), a title bestowed by the State of Arkansas
- Arkansas Traveler tomato, a variety of heirloom tomato
- "The Arkansas Traveler", nickname and stage persona of Bob Burns
- Arkansas Travelers, a minor league baseball team in Little Rock, Arkansas
- Arkansas Traveler (magazine), a humor magazine founded by Opie Read

== See also ==
- Kit, the Arkansas Traveler, 1868 stage play
