= Music of Arkansas =

Arkansas is a Southern state of the United States. Arkansas's musical heritage includes country music and various related styles like bluegrass and rockabilly.

== State songs ==
Arkansas has four official state songs:

- State Anthem: "Arkansas" by Mrs. Eva Ware Barnett
- State Historical Song: "The Arkansas Traveler" by Colonel Sanford C. Faulkner
- State Song: "Oh, Arkansas" by Terry Rose and Gary Klaff
- State Song: "Arkansas (You Run Deep In Me)" by Wayland Holyfield

Two of the official state songs are because of a copyright dispute. "Arkansas" was published in 1916 by the Central Music Company, written by Eva Ware Barnett and Will M. Ramsey (though state law only credits Mrs. Barnett). It became the official song on January 12, 1917. Until either 1945 or 1949, "Arkansas" was the only official song in Arkansas. At that time, there was a copyright dispute and the state adopted "The Arkansas Traveler" as the official song, a situation that remained unchanged until 1963. In that year, the copyright dispute was resolved and "Arkansas" became official again, until 1987, when it was changed to the official state anthem. In that year, "Arkansas (You Run Deep In Me)" and "Oh, Arkansas" were officially designated state songs as well, and "The Arkansas Traveler" was designated the official state historical song.

== Arkansas politicians and music ==
Two Arkansas politicians have been noted for mixing music with their campaigns for the presidency. Bill Clinton, attorney general and 50th and 52nd governor of the state and later president, played the saxophone, famously performing "Heartbreak Hotel" on The Arsenio Hall Show during the 1992 presidential election. Mike Huckabee, 54th governor, plays the bass guitar, and his campaign in the 2008 presidential election has prominently featured cover song performances by his band Capitol Offense.

== Genres ==
=== Classical ===
Composer Florence Price was born in Little Rock in 1887.

The Arkansas Symphony Orchestra was founded in 1966. When the orchestra was founded, a local bank held the organization responsible for the debts of previous attempts at organizing an orchestra. Ten individual members assumed responsibility for the debt, and so the orchestra was formed, led by experienced conductor Vasilios Priakos. Today the Orchestra is conducted by Geoff Robson. They have an extensive outreach and education program. In February 2012, George Takei performed with the group in a Holocaust memorial.

=== Country, bluegrass, and folk music ===
Traditional folk instruments include the fiddle and banjo as well as guitar, mandolin, dulcimer and autoharp.

Located in the Ozark Mountains, the town of Mountain View bills itself as the "Folk Music Capital of the World". There is an Arkansas Entertainers Hall of Fame, which includes musicians like Ronnie Dunn, Melvin Endsley, and Al Green.

Jimmy Driftwood and Beau Renfro.

Indie Folk group Little Chief is made up of former University of Arkansas student Matt Cooper and is based out of Fayetteville.

=== Gospel ===
Gospel music is very popular in Arkansas. Because of the racial tension extant since slavery in the Delta region, gospel music has had a tremendous influence in the lives of African Americans in Arkansas. While Blues is dominated by men, it is the women of Arkansas who have led the way in gospel music. Gospel composer, singer, pianist, arranger Roberta Martin was born in Helena. The Brockwell Gospel Music School in Brockwell, Arkansas in Izard County, has been offering a two-week summer course in Gospel music since 1947.

=== Blues and R&B ===
Country blues singer and slide guitarist Casey Bill Weldon was born in Pine Bluff. Blues pianist Roosevelt Sykes was born in Elmar. Jump blues singer Jimmy Witherspoon was born in Gurdon. Electric blues and Chicago blues artist Willie "Big Eyes" Smith was born in Helena. Guitarist, singer, and songwriter Pat Hare, born in Cherry Valley, served as a sideman at Sun Records in Memphis. Billy Lee Riley, born in Pocahontas, and Sonny Burgess, born near Newport, also recorded for Sun.

West Memphis, just across the Mississippi river from Memphis, Tennessee, has its own thriving music scene. When Beale Street would shut down for the night, performers like B. B. King, Ike Turner, Junior Parker, and Elmore James came to 8th street in West Memphis. Wayne Jackson even said once that "the Memphis sound was born over the river". Jackson was born and raised in West Memphis as was Chicago blues artist Junior Wells. The West Memphis R&B scene was an integral part of the Civil Rights Movement of the 1960s.

=== Jazz ===
Jazz artists born in Arkansas include pianist and bandleader Alphonse Trent from Fort Smith, trombonist Snub Mosley born in Little Rock, pianist and composer Walter Norris born in Little Rock, Joe Bishop born in Monticello, saxophonist Pharoah Sanders born in Little Rock, free jazz tenor saxophonist Kalaparusha Maurice McIntyre born in Clarksville, tenor saxophonist Red Holloway born in Helena, tenor saxophonist and bandleader Hayes Pillars born in North Little Rock, Oliver Lake born in Marianna, pianist Bob Dorough born in Cherry Hill, bassist James Leary born in Little Rock, pianist Art Porter, Sr. and saxophonist Art Porter, Jr. born in Little Rock, and Amina Claudine Myers born in Blackwell.

=== Rock ===
Sister Rosetta Tharpe from Cotton Plant was a gospel artist who achieved crossover success and became a rock and roll pioneer, influencing among many others fellow Arkansas native Johnny Cash from Kingsland. Sonny Burgess was another Arkansan who influenced the rock and roll industry as an artist for Sun Records in adjacent Memphis, Tennessee. Arkansas early rock and roll was typically rockabilly music influenced by Zydeco music and blues.

Arkansas garage rock and psychedelic music of the 1960s has been reexamined by Psych of the South with Lost Souls.

=== Independent and local ===
While Arkansas is known for its southern styles of music, there is a much younger style coming from the state as well. In the late 1990s, and early 2000s, there were many rock music groups, as well as pop rock groups. One of the best-known bands from this time would be multi-platinum-selling rock band Evanescence, which has origins in Little Rock.

In the 1970s and 1980s, Little Rock became the home of a thriving punk and metal music scene. The 1990s DIY scene was captured in the 2007 film Towncraft. As the trends have changed, post-hardcore and metalcore bands such as Norma Jean gained popularity. Doom Metal is represented by Pallbearer from Little Rock, while Rwake is known for southern sludge metal. American Princes from Little Rock show the indie rock side of Arkansas.

Young Freq is a rapper from Little Rock working with local independent label Roc Town Music Group, formed in 2013.

Tommy Riggs (Tom Payton) is an Arkansan singer, piano and keyboard player who had several bands while performing around the state in the 1960s and 1970s. He also was working as a radio DJ (as Tom Jones) at the time, on KCLA, during 1968 through 69 and as Tom Payton on KXLR in North Little Rock in 1964, and in 1966 at KAAY. During this period, he promoted himself as Tom Payton and the Kingpins, Tom Payton with The Playboys, and several other names. He recorded while he was Rock Robbins from KAAY on the Little Rock label MY Records in 1966. Two songs from the session were released on a 45 rpm record, "My Little Girl" and "Good Lovin'".

Arkansas's rock and roll scene is served by a free monthly magazine launched by Peter Read on December 8, 1980, called Night Flying.

== Notable musicians from Arkansas ==
- Kris Allen (Jacksonville and Conway)
- Black Oak Arkansas (Black Oak)
- Big Bill Broonzy (Lake Dick)
- The Browns (Sparkman)
- Michael Burks (Camden)
- Glen Campbell (Delight)
- Johnny Cash (Dyess)
- Willie Cobbs (Smale)
- CeDell Davis (Helena)
- Jimmy Driftwood (Mountain View)
- Melvin Endsley (Drasco)
- Amy Lee (Little Rock)
- Adam Faucett (Little Rock)
- Lefty Frizzell (El Dorado)
- Al Green (Forrest City)
- Ronnie Hawkins (Fayetteville)
- Levon Helm (Turkey Scratch)
- Barbara Hendricks (Stephens)
- Zilphia Horton (Spadra)
- Louis Jordan (Brinkley)
- Tracy Lawrence (Foreman)
- Living Sacrifice (Little Rock)
- Ashley McBryde (Mammoth Spring)
- Justin Moore (Poyen)
- Conlon Nancarrow (Texarkana)
- Ne-Yo (Camden)
- Joe Nichols (Rogers)
- Pallbearer (Little Rock)
- PMtoday (Jacksonville)
- Florence Price (Little Rock)
- Collin Raye (DeQueen)
- Charlie Rich (Colt)
- Almeda Riddle (Cleburne County)
- Rwake (North Little Rock)
- Pharoah Sanders (Little Rock)
- Nick Shoulders (Fayetteville)
- Willie "Big Eyes" Smith (Helena)
- Les Spann (Pine Bluff)
- William Grant Still (Little Rock)
- Johnnie Taylor (Crawfordsville)
- Sister Rosetta Tharpe (Cotton Plant)
- Trusty (Little Rock)
- Conway Twitty (Helena)
- Soophie Nun Squad (North Little Rock)
- Roosevelt Sykes (Elmar)
- Deas Vail (Russellville)
- Washboard Sam (Wheat Ridge)
- Junior Walker (Blytheville)
- William Warfield (West Helena)
- The Wedding (Fayetteville)
- Welles (Ozark)
- Peetie Wheatstraw (Cotton Plant)
- Baby Face Willette (Little Rock)
- Bankroll Freddie (Helena) and (Conway)

== Festivals ==
Among Arkansas's most prominent modern musical festivals is Riverfest, a music festival held along the Arkansas River in downtown Little Rock. Riverfront Blues Festival, Ft Smith Arkansas in June. Riverfest has been held annually since 1978. The King Biscuit Blues Festival is held each October in Helena. It has been ongoing since 1986. The festival seeks to celebrate and preserve the rich blues history of the region.
