= Short, sharp shock (disambiguation) =

"Short, sharp shock" is a phrase meaning "punishment that is quick and severe."

Short, sharp shock may also refer to:

- Short Sharp Shock (band)
- Shortsharpshock E.P., first 1993 EP released by the band Therapy?
- A Short, Sharp Shock, 1990 fantasy novel written by Kim Stanley Robinson
- Short Sharp Shock (film) (Kurz und schmerzlos), 1998 film by Fatih Akin
- Short Sharp Shock, 2007 album by Short Sharp Shock
- Short Sharp Shock, 1984 album by Chaos UK

== See also ==
- Short Sharp Shocked, a 1988 album by Michelle Shocked
