= Cephas Washburn =

American missionary

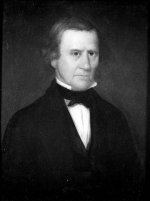
- Born: July 25, 1793; Rutland, Vermont, U.S.
- Died: March 17, 1860 (aged 66); Little Rock, Arkansas, U.S.
- Education: University of Vermont, Andover Theological Seminary
- Occupations: Minister, missionary
- Years active: 1819–1860
- Known for: Missionary to the Cherokee people
- Spouse: Abigail F. Woodward
- Children: Edward Payson Washburn

Cephas Washburn (July 25, 1793 – March 17, 1860) was a Christian missionary and educator who worked with the Cherokee of northwest Arkansas and eastern Oklahoma. He later worked to establish churches in Arkansas.

== Early life and education ==
Cephas Washburn was born on July 25, 1793, in Rutland, Vermont. His parents were Josiah W. and Phebe (née Cushman) Washburn. His father was a farmer, and Cephas seemed destined to follow in that occupation. However, he suffered a broken leg while working and decided to take up teaching as a career. While raising enough money to pursue higher education, he taught school in Groton, Massachusetts, in 1814 and 1815. While teaching, he became a member of the Congregationalist church and decided to become a missionary to the Indians.

He graduated from the University of Vermont, and the Andover Theological Seminary. After graduating from the University of Vermont, he was ordained as a Congregational minister. The Royalton Congregational Association in Randolph, Vermont, licensed Washburn to preach in January 1818.

On October 6, 1818, he married Abigail F. Woodward of Randolph, Vermont.

== Career ==
After the Washburns were married, Cephas was ordained in 1818 in Waitsfield, Vermont, by the American Board of Commissioners for Foreign Missions (ABCFM) to serve as a missionary to the Eastern Cherokee Indians, who then lived primarily in the U.S. State of Georgia. He was assigned to the Cherokee. He remained in Georgia for about one year. Then the ABCFM sent him to Arkansas as the missionary to Cherokees who had already begun moving west. These people would thereafter be called "Western Cherokees".

He served as a missionary to the Cherokee Indians at Brainerd Mission, Tennessee, for a short while. He migrated with them westward, arriving in Arkansas in 1819. This was a group that removed relatively early from the Southeast, rather than waiting for forced removal after the US Congress passed the Indian Removal Act of 1830. Most Cherokee were removed across the Mississippi River to a designated part of Indian Territory (present Eastern Oklahoma)in 1838.

The party that traveled to Arkansas included not only Cephas Washburn and his wife, but also his brother in law, Reverend Alfred Finney, as well as several others who would support the educational facility. Washburn founded Dwight Presbyterian Mission near present-day Russellville in 1820 to serve the newly arrived Cherokee. Dwight was the first American mission to the Indians west of the Mississippi River. It was named for Rev. Timothy Dwight, president of Yale College and a corporate member of the American Board of Commissioners for Foreign Missions. Dwight Mission (later called "Old Dwight Mission") in Arkansas was supplanted by another mission with the same name in Indian Territory, near what is now Sallisaw, Oklahoma. The latter became known as "New Dwight Mission".

Washburn served as the primary Indian missionary in the Arkansas region until he resigned in 1850. From 1850 to 1856 he served as minister for the First Presbyterian Church in Fort Smith, Arkansas.

== Later life, death and burial ==
Cephas Washburn died at Little Rock, Arkansas, on March 17, 1860, of pneumonia, while traveling to Helena, Arkansas, for an evangelical meeting. He is buried at the historic Mount Holly Cemetery in downtown Little Rock.

== Family ==
Washburn's son Edward Payson Washburn was the artist who painted the well-known Arkansas Traveller painting. It received wide distribution and recognition when printed as a Currier & Ives lithograph. The painting was inspired by the humorous song "Arkansas Traveller" by Sandford C. Faulkner. His granddaughter Mabel Washbourne Anderson was a noted Cherokee writer.
