= Short, sharp shock =

Severe but brief punishment

The phrase "short, sharp shock" describes a punishment that is severe but which only lasts for a short time. It is an example of alliteration. Although the phrase originated earlier, it was popularised in Gilbert and Sullivan's 1885 comic opera The Mikado, where it appears in the song near the end of Act I, "I Am So Proud". It has since been used in popular songs, song titles, and literature, as well as in general speech.

== Origin ==
Mary I of England used the phrase in 1555 to refer to what she hoped would be a brief and effective use of brutality to persuade the populace to return to Catholicism by publicly burning a small number of visible Protestant heretics, rather than making a larger more systemic purge.

John Conington's 1870 translation of the First Satire of Horace includes the following lines:

Yon soldier's lot is happier, sure, than mine:
One short, sharp shock, and presto! all is done.

== The Mikado ==
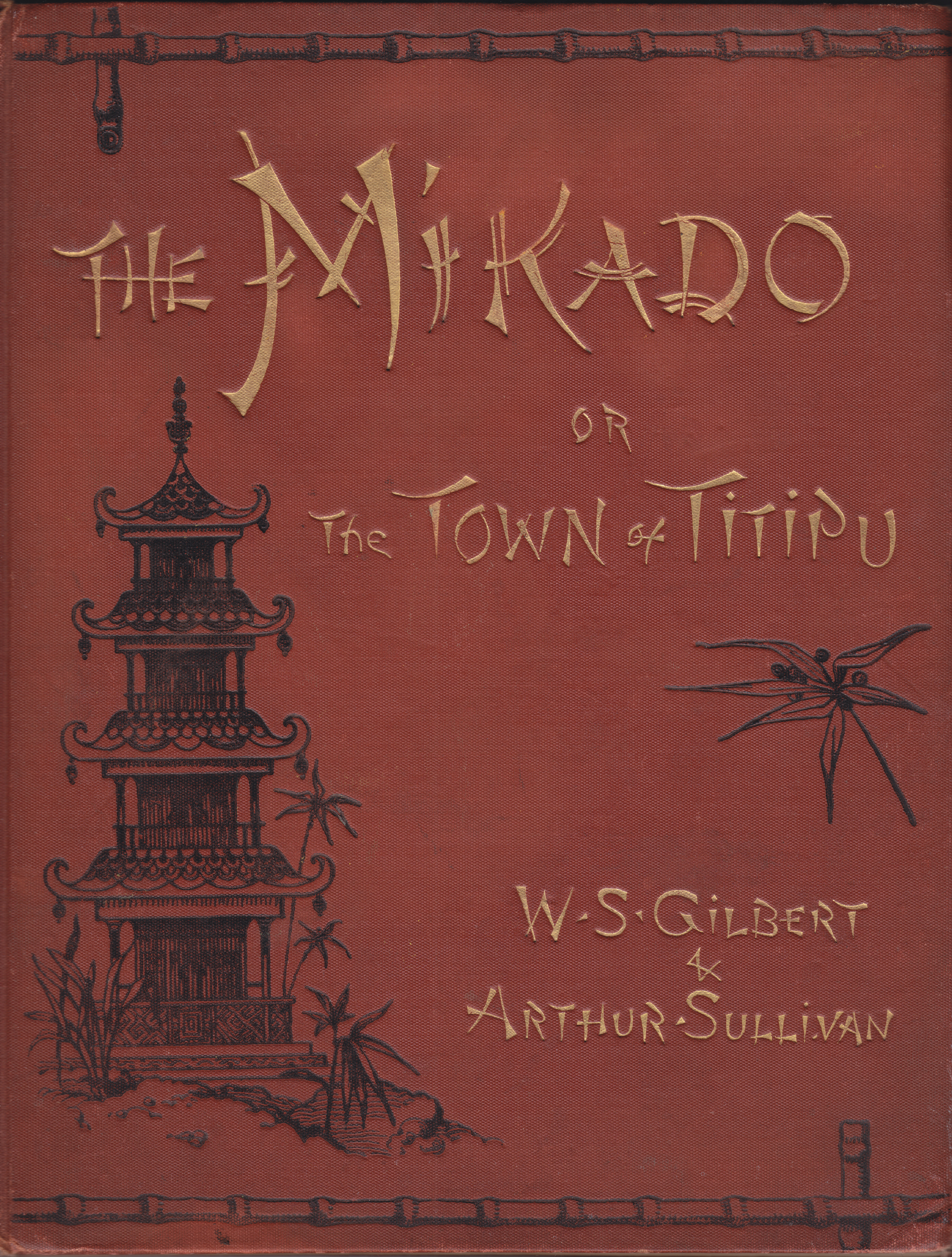
The cover of a vocal score for Gilbert and Sullivan's The Mikado

In Act I of the 1885 Gilbert and Sullivan opera The Mikado, the Emperor of Japan, having learned the town of Titipu is behind on its quota of executions, has decreed that at least one beheading must occur immediately. Three government officials, Pooh-Bah, Ko-Ko and Pish-Tush, discuss which of them should be beheaded to save the town from ruin. Pooh-Bah says that, although his enormous pride would normally prompt him to volunteer for such an important civic duty, he has decided to "mortify" his pride, and so he declines this heroic undertaking. He points out that Ko-Ko is already under sentence of death for the capital crime of flirting, and so Ko-Ko is the obvious choice to be beheaded. The three characters then sing the song "I Am So Proud". In the last lines of the song, they contemplate "the sensation" of the "short, sharp shock" caused by being beheaded:

To sit in solemn silence in a dull, dark dock,
In a pestilential prison, with a lifelong lock,
Awaiting the sensation of a short, sharp shock,
From a cheap and chippy chopper on a big black block!

== In popular culture ==
=== Songs and albums ===
The phrase is spoken by roadie Roger Manifold in the Pink Floyd song "Us and Them" on the band's 1973 album, The Dark Side of the Moon, which is the fourth best selling album of all time.

Short Sharp Shock is the name of a 1984 album by Chaos UK. It also appears in the title of an album, Short Sharp Shocked, by Michelle Shocked and the EP "Shortsharpshock" by Therapy?. Short Sharp Shock is the name of a crossover thrash band from Liverpool, England. The phrase is used in the song "East Side Beat" by the Toasters, and in the 1980 song Stand Down Margaret by the Beat. It can also be found in the lyrics of a Billy Bragg song entitled "It Says Here" found on his 1984 album Brewing Up with Billy Bragg and of a They Might Be Giants song entitled "Circular Karate Chop" on their 2013 album Nanobots.

=== Literature ===
In literature, the phrase is used in the title of a 1990 fantasy novel, A Short, Sharp Shock by Kim Stanley Robinson. In the 1996 fantasy novel by Terry Pratchett, Feet of Clay, police commander Sam Vimes is "all for giving criminals a short, sharp shock", meaning electrocution.

== UK politics ==
Since Gilbert and Sullivan used the phrase in The Mikado, "short, sharp shock" has been used in political discourse in the UK. The phrase met renewed popularity with respect to government policy on young offenders pursued by the Conservative government of 1979–1990 under Margaret Thatcher, having appeared in the 1979 Conservative Policy manifesto, which promised that the party would "experiment with a tougher regime as a short, sharp shock for young criminals". These policies led to the enactment of the Criminal Justice Acts of 1982 and 1988 which, among other reforms, replaced borstals with youth detention centres. The "short, sharp shock" programme had no effect on reoffending, with more than half of offenders being convicted again within a year and young offenders being released back into the community "stronger, fitter, wiser and meaner". The policy was abandoned.

== Sources ==
- Bradley, Ian (1996). The Complete Annotated Gilbert and Sullivan. Oxford, England: Oxford University Press. ISBN 0-19-816503-X.
