= Anchorage (song) =

1988 single by Michelle Shocked

Single by Michelle Shocked

from the album Short Sharp Shocked
- B-side: "Fogtown"
- Released: September 12, 1988
- Length: 3:24
- Label: Mercury
- Songwriter: Michelle Shocked
- Producer: Pete Anderson

Michelle Shocked singles chronology
"Anchorage" (1988)	"If Love Was a Train" (1988)

"Anchorage" is the debut single of American singer-songwriter Michelle Shocked, released as the lead single from her first studio album, Short Sharp Shocked (1988), in September 1988. The song peaked at number 66 on the US Billboard Hot 100 and also charted in Australia, Canada, and the United Kingdom, reaching the top 75 in these countries.

== Lyrical content ==
The song is about the singer finally "taking time out to write to an old friend" who has moved from Texas to Anchorage, Alaska, and her friend's reply. In her reply, her friend realizes she might have become a housewife "anchored down in Anchorage" but still dreaming about her childhood in Texas with her good friend Michelle, who went on to an exciting life as a musician and a "skateboard punk rocker in New York". She tells the singer that her husband Leroy says "send a picture", "hello", and "keep on rocking".

Much of the song's lyrics were taken directly from a letter from JoAnn Kelli Bingham, a Comanche Indian and recently married friend who had recently moved to geographically remote Alaska. Her husband is Leroy Bingham, a Blackfeet Indian who worked for Cook Inlet Tribal Council.

== Track listings ==
US and Australian 7-inch single

A. "Anchorage" – 3:21
B. "Anchorage" (live) – 4:14

UK 10-inch and CD single

1. "Anchorage"
2. "Fogtown"
3. "Penny Evans" (live at Glastonbury)
4. "Re-Modelling the Pentagon" (live at Glastonbury)

UK 7-inch single

A. "Anchorage"
B. "Fogtown"

UK 12-inch single

A1. "Anchorage"
A2. "Strawberry Jam" (live at Glastonbury)
B1. "Fogtown" (from Texas Campfire L.P.)
B2. "Fogtown"

== Charts ==
Weekly chart performance for "Anchorage"
Chart (1988–1989)	Peak position
Australia (Australian Music Report)	51
Canada Top Singles (RPM)	70
Italy Airplay (Music & Media)	6
UK Singles (Official Charts)	60
US Billboard Hot 100	66
US Adult Contemporary (Billboard)	42
US Modern Rock Tracks (Billboard)	16
