= Mabel Washbourne Anderson =

American writer

- Mabel Washbourne Anderson, from a 1949 newspaper
- Born: Mabel Washbourne; April 11, 1863; Russellville, Arkansas, U.S.
- Died: September 6, 1949 (aged 86)
- Other name: Mabel Stuart Washburn
- Occupations: Writer, educator
- Relatives: John Ridge (grandfather); Cephas Washburn (grandfather); Edward Payson Washburn (uncle); John Rollin Ridge (uncle); Major Ridge (great-grandfather); Stand Watie (great-uncle)

Mabel Washbourne Anderson (April 11, 1863 – September 6, 1949) was an American writer and educator based in Oklahoma. She wrote biographies, poetry, and fiction, mostly focused on Cherokee history and culture.

== Early life and education ==
Washbourne was born in Russellville, Arkansas, and raised in Indian Territory (now Oklahoma), the daughter of Josiah Woodward Washbourne and Susan Catherine Ridge Washbourne. Her father was white; her paternal grandfather, Cephas Washburn, was a white missionary from Vermont who worked in Cherokee communities in Arkansas and Oklahoma. Her maternal grandfather, John Ridge, was a Cherokee leader, as was his father, Major Ridge. Both of Washbourne's parents died in 1871. She graduated from the Cherokee Female Seminary in Tahlequah in 1883.

== Career and publications ==
Anderson taught school in Oklahoma for many years, and wrote stories and poems for magazines and newspapers. She was a member of the Sequoyah Literary Society and the United Daughters of the Confederacy. Eleanor Roosevelt mentioned visiting with Anderson in a 1937 My Day column, saying "I enjoyed talking to her about Cherokee history and am looking forward to reading the little book she left with me."

- "From Eureka Springs" (1887, Indian Chieftain)
- "An Osage Niobe" (1900, Tahlequah Arrow)
- "Nowita, the Sweet Singer" (1900, poem)
- "Difficulties of the Five Tribes" (1901, The Republic)
- "Echo of a Sermon" (1901, Indian Chieftain)
- "Some of the Children of Charles Dickens' Fancy" (1901, Twin Territories)
- "Love of the Beautiful" (1901, Twin Territories)
- "Edward Pason Washbourne" (1903, Vinita Daily Chieftain)
- "United Daughters of the Confederacy" (1903, Vinita Weekly Chieftain)
- "Father of his Country" (1905, Vinita Chieftain)
- "Old Fort Gibson on the Grand" (1906, Indian Advocate)
- "The Southern Artist" (1907, Sturm's Oklahoma Magazine)
- "Joe Jamison's Sacrifice" (1908, Sturm's)
- "The Cherokee Poet and 'Mount Shasta' (1908, Sturm's)
- "The Story of Nowita" (1911, The Pryor Creek Clipper)
- "Easter and Nature in Happy Harmony" (1911, Sturm's)
- The life of General Stand Watie (1915, 1931)
- "General Stand Watie" (1932, Chronicles of Oklahoma)
- "Old Fort Gibson" (1932, Chronicles of Oklahoma)

== Personal life and legacy ==
Washbourne married John Carlton Anderson in 1891. They had two daughters, Gladys and Helen. She died in 1949, at the age of 86, in Tulsa, Oklahoma. Writing by Anderson was included in the collection Native American Writing in the Southeast: An Anthology !875–1935 (UBC Press 1995), in Changing is not Vanishing: A Collection of American Indian Poetry to 1930 (University of Pennsylvania Press 2011), and in Nina Baym's Women Writers of the American West, 1833–1927 (2012).
