= Arkansas Traveler (radio show) =

Arkansas Traveler was a bluegrass show on WDET 101.9 FM out of Detroit, Michigan, United States. Its host was Larry McDaniel, a passionate fan who had an encyclopedic knowledge of the genre. A transplant from Arkansas, McDaniel broadcast bluegrass over the Detroit airwaves from 1977 until his death in 2013. Arkansas Traveler was one of the longest running bluegrass shows in the country and the only show of its kind in southeast Michigan.

== History ==
"Bluegrass is our music," says McDaniel. "It's American. It's like blues or jazz. This music is about roots."

In September 2004, WDET canceled the program when they experimented with several formatting changes. According to McDaniel, a consultant to the station expressed that although Arkansas Traveler had high Arbitron numbers, it caused "audience churn", meaning everyone would tune in for the show, and then turn it off again (source). However, after listener pledges dropped significantly through 2005, WDET hired new general manager Michael Coleman, who returned many of the canceled programs to the station. Arkansas Traveler went back on the air on December 17, 2005.

Almost exactly four years later, WDET again canceled the program, citing the program as a "fringe" and "specialty" program. Even though The Arkansas Traveler was at an all-time high for both ratings and fund-raising dollars, WDET leadership felt the show sounded too different from their other offerings and therefore had to be eliminated from the broadcast schedule. ()

On December 19, 2009, WDET "Arkansas Traveler" again aired its final show. ()

Larry McDaniel died during the early morning hours of January 4, 2013.

== See also ==
- The Bob Burns Show
- Arkansas Traveler (folklore)
