= Biscuit Company Lofts =

Building in Los Angeles, California

Coordinates: 34.035991°N 118.233157°W

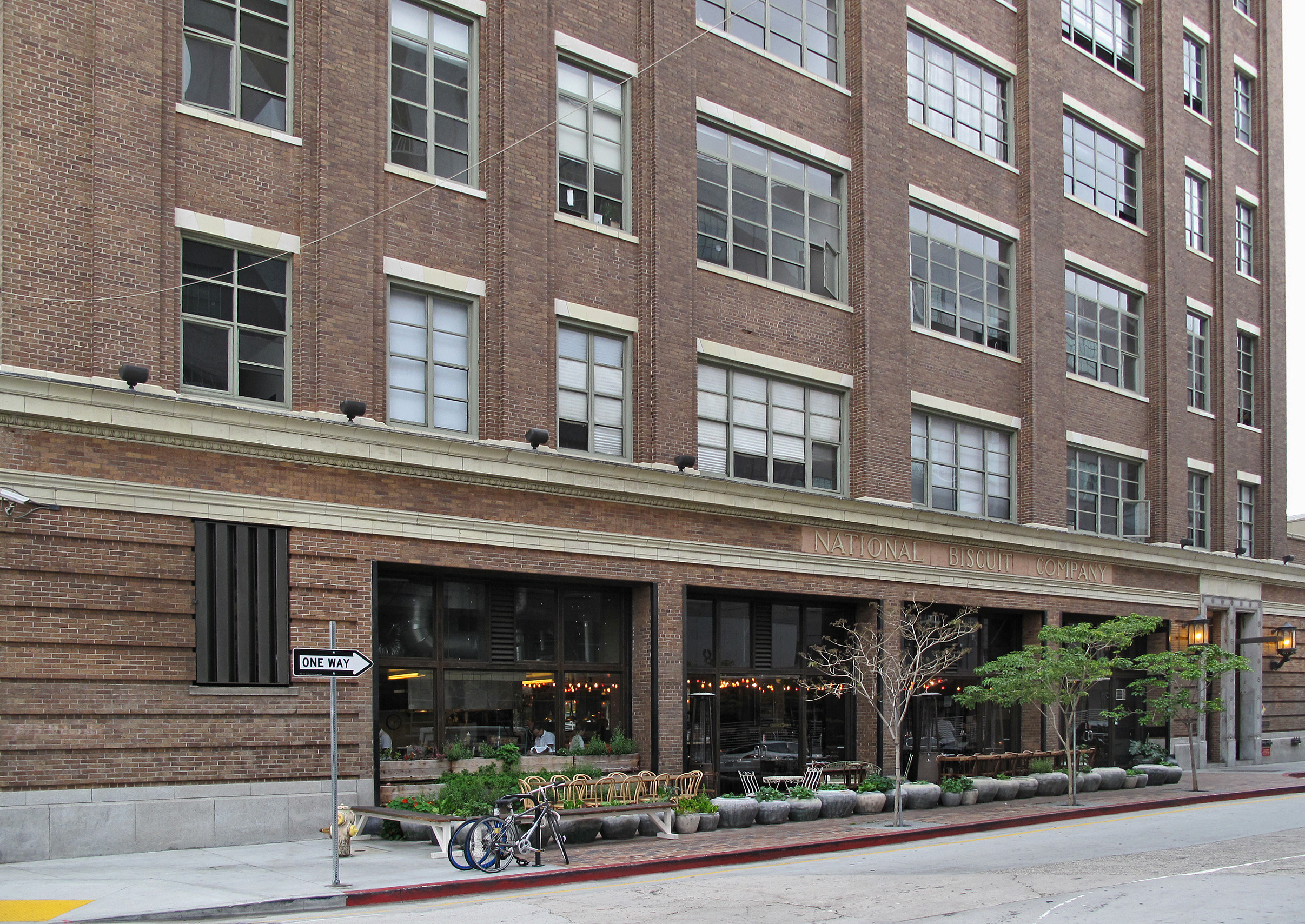
- Interactive map of the Biscuit Company Lofts area

General information
- Status: Completed
- Location: 1850 Industrial St; Los Angeles, California
- Construction started: February 1925
- Completed: 1925
- Cost: $2,000,000

Technical details
- Floor count: 7
- Floor area: 187,000 sq ft (17,400 m^{2})

Design and construction
- Architect: Eckel & Aldrich
- Main contractor: Pozzo Construction Co.

Los Angeles Historic-Cultural Monument
- Official name: National Biscuit Company Building
- Designated: October 9, 2007
- Reference no.: 888

The Biscuit Company Lofts is a 7-story building in Los Angeles, California. Built in 1925 as a factory, the building was converted to live/work lofts in 2006.

== History ==
Conceived as the west coast headquarters for the National Biscuit Company, this landmark structure was designed by Eckel & Aldrich of St. Joseph, Missouri. Constructed in 1925 for a cost of 2 million dollars, this 7 story factory quickly became an architectural sensation.

In 2006, the building underwent a $25,000,000 renovation by Aleks Istanbullu Architects to convert the building to lofts. In 2007, developer Linear City LLC completed restoration of the property, part of the larger downtown L.A. gentrification effort that saw the repurposing of the area's mostly-abandoned industrial structures into 104 live/work lofts. Swinerton Builders operated as the general contractor on the renovation project. Building amenities include a 24-hour doorman, a 75-foot-long saline swimming pool and a gym.

L.A.’s Office of Historic Resources declared the building an historic cultural monument in 2007. As a designated historical monument, the Biscuit Company Lofts qualifies for the Mills Act Program, a provision that offers homeowners an allowance on their annual property taxes.

In 2022, Justin Lin sold his 4,300 square penthouse atop the 7th floor of Biscuit Company Lofts for $5.5 million.

== In popular culture ==
The building was featured in Downtown with Huell Howser.

== Notable residents ==
- Nicolas Cage (2008)
- Vincent Gallo (2009-2012)
- Justin Lin (2012–2022)
- Michelle Shocked
- David Willardson
- David Klein, A.S.C.

== Awards ==
- 2008: Chicago Title Renovated Buildings Award, Residential
