= Arkansas Traveler (folklore) =

American folklore character

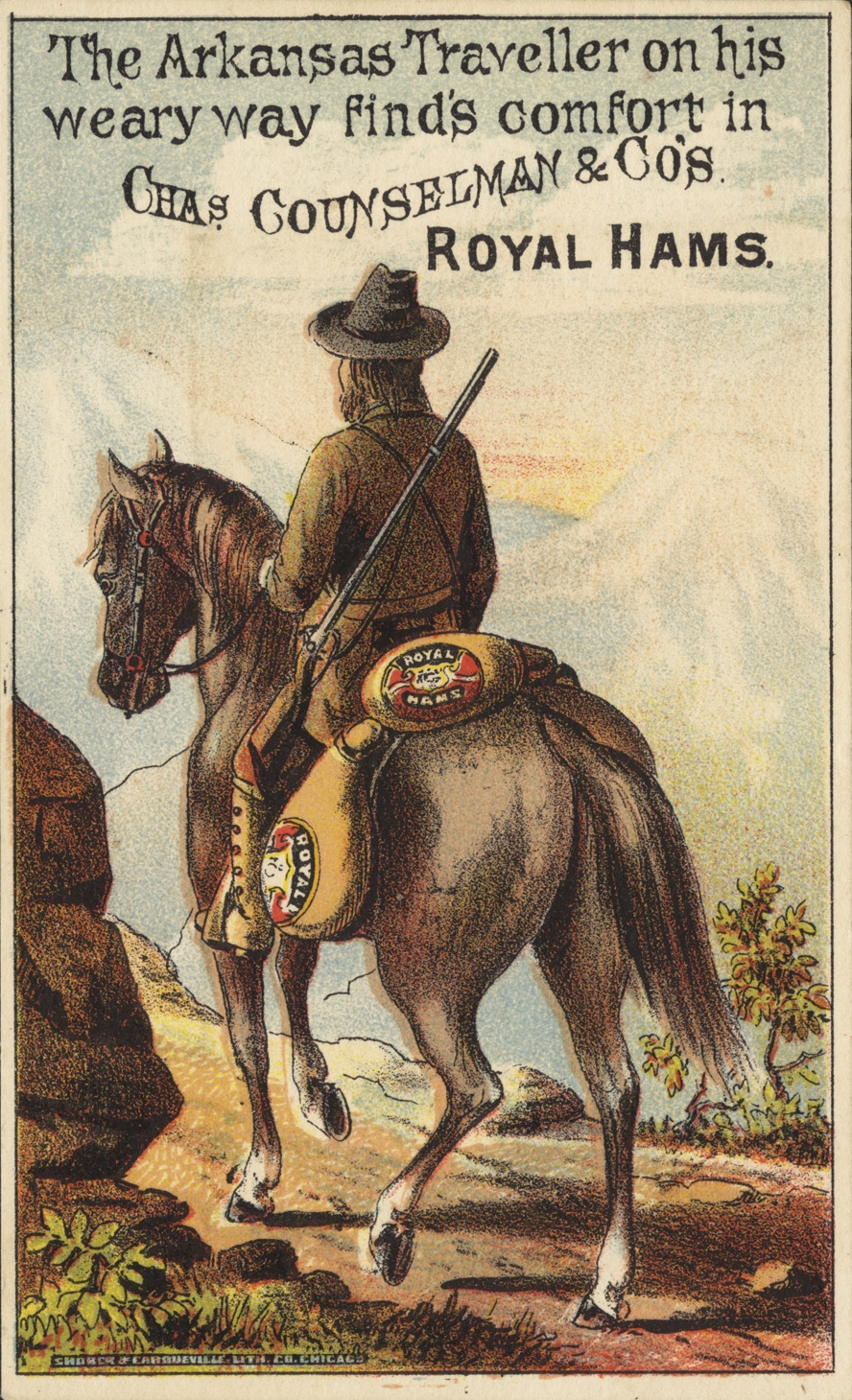
The Arkansas Traveller on his weary way (an advertisement from 1900 for ham)

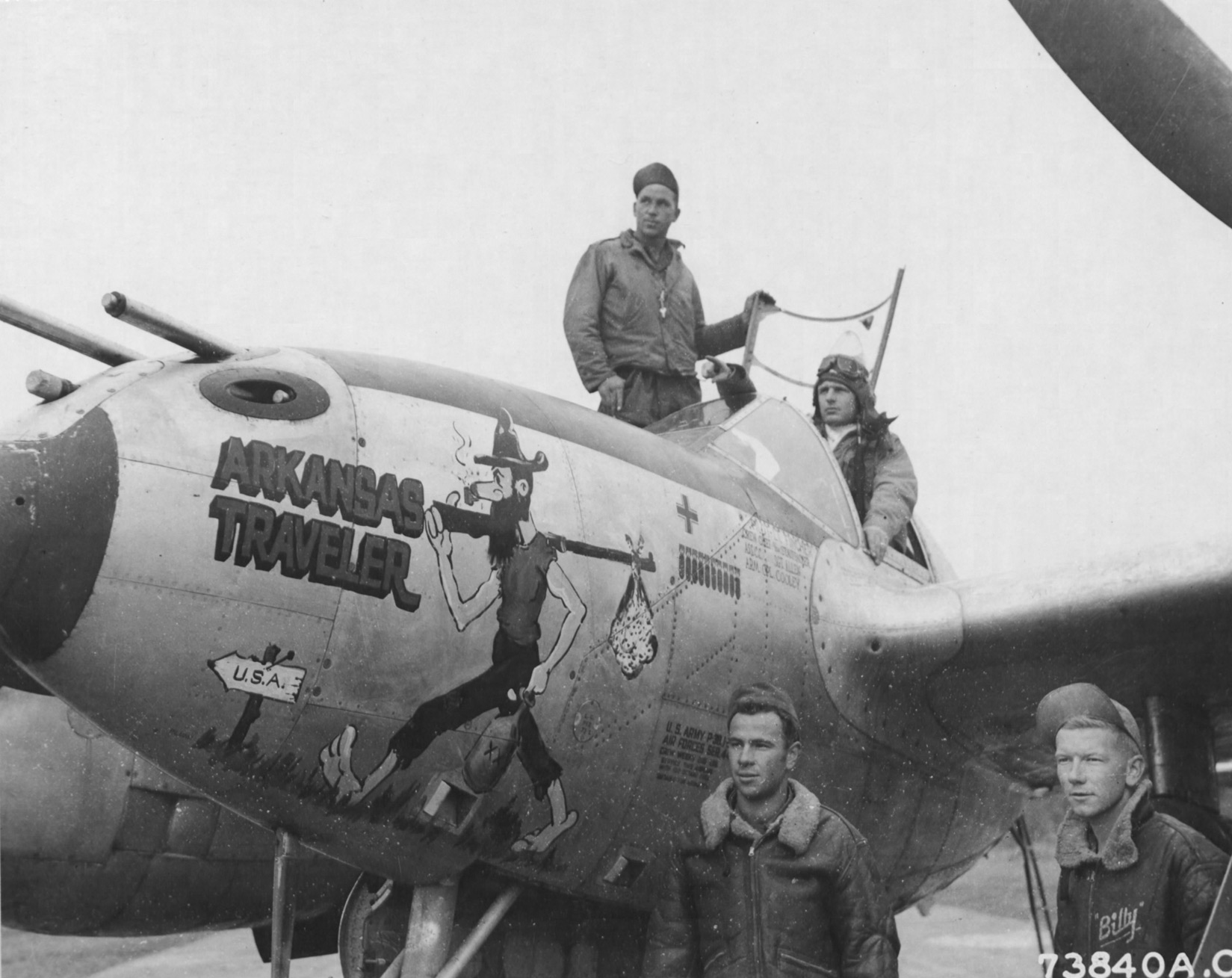
U. S. Air Force's Lockheed P-38 (October 1944) named the 'Arkansas Traveler' at Clastres Airfield, France

The Arkansas Traveler, or Arkansas Traveller, is a figure of American folklore and popular culture from the first half of the 19th century. The character is said to have originated with Sandford C. Faulkner.

It has had a widespread impact on culture as the namesake of newspapers, radio and television shows, a baseball team, a fruit variety, an album by Texan folk singer Michelle Shocked and an honorary title awarded by the governor of the state of Arkansas. The character has also been perceived as a discriminatory stereotype of 'hillbillies' and has been heavily criticized.

== Origins ==
The tale is said to have originated with Sandford C. Faulkner (1806–1874) a Kentucky-born raconteur, fiddler, and planter. He owned a plantation in Chicot County, Arkansas. Faulkner's tale about 'Arkansas Traveler' influenced the creation of Mose Case's mid-19th century folk song "Arkansas Traveler," has since become the official state historic song of Arkansas since 1987.

== Story ==
There are numerous variations of the story; supposedly it was an event that occurred on the campaign trail in Arkansas in 1840 to Sandford C. Faulkner. A well-dressed traveler on horseback, the Arkansas Traveler, meets a fiddle-playing settler (sometimes described as a squatter) and the traveler asks for a place to sleep in his humble home. The settler initially rejects him, pointing out the cramped conditions and his poverty, and continues to try in vain to play a melody on the fiddle. The traveler then plays a whole tune on the settler's fiddle, whereupon the settler enthusiastically offers him board and lodging.

== Influence and legacy ==
=== Fine art ===
Edward Payson Washburn was one of the best-known artists in Arkansas during the Antebellum-era. He painted "Arkansas Traveler" in 1856 based on the story he heard from Faulkner. The painting went on to inspire a series of prints, in 1859, Leopold Grozelier created a lithograph of the Washburn painting; and in 1870, Currier and Ives created two lithographs of the Washburn painting.

Fine art prints related to the Arkansas Traveler folklore

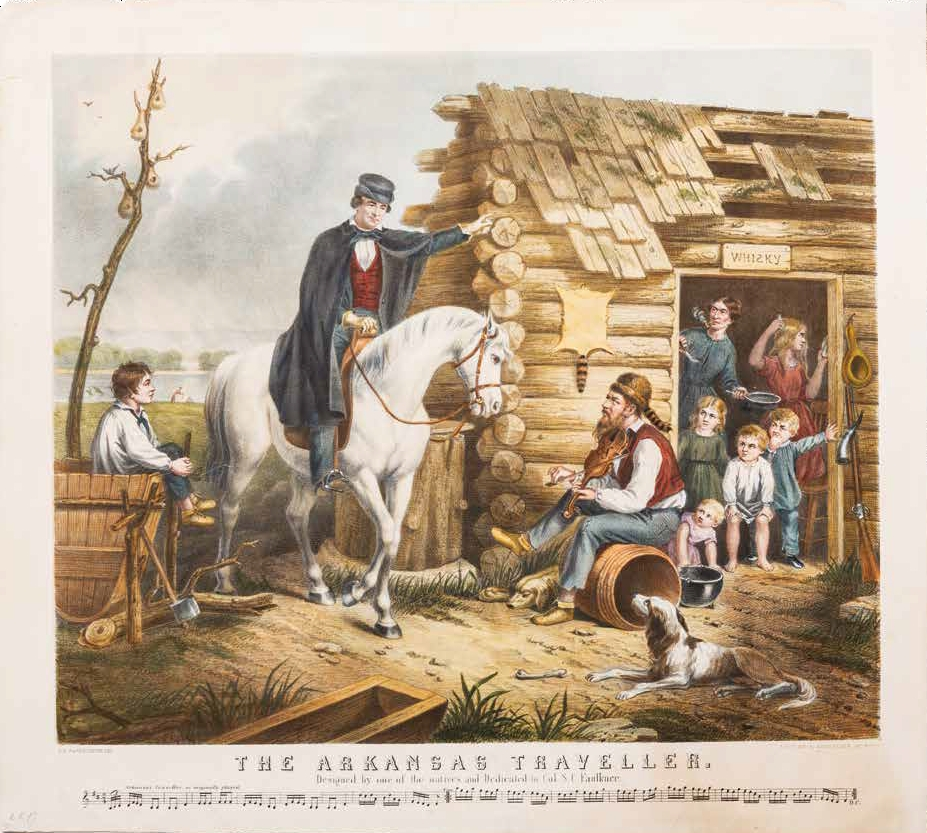
Lithograph from 1859 by Leopold Grozelier, after the painting Washburn

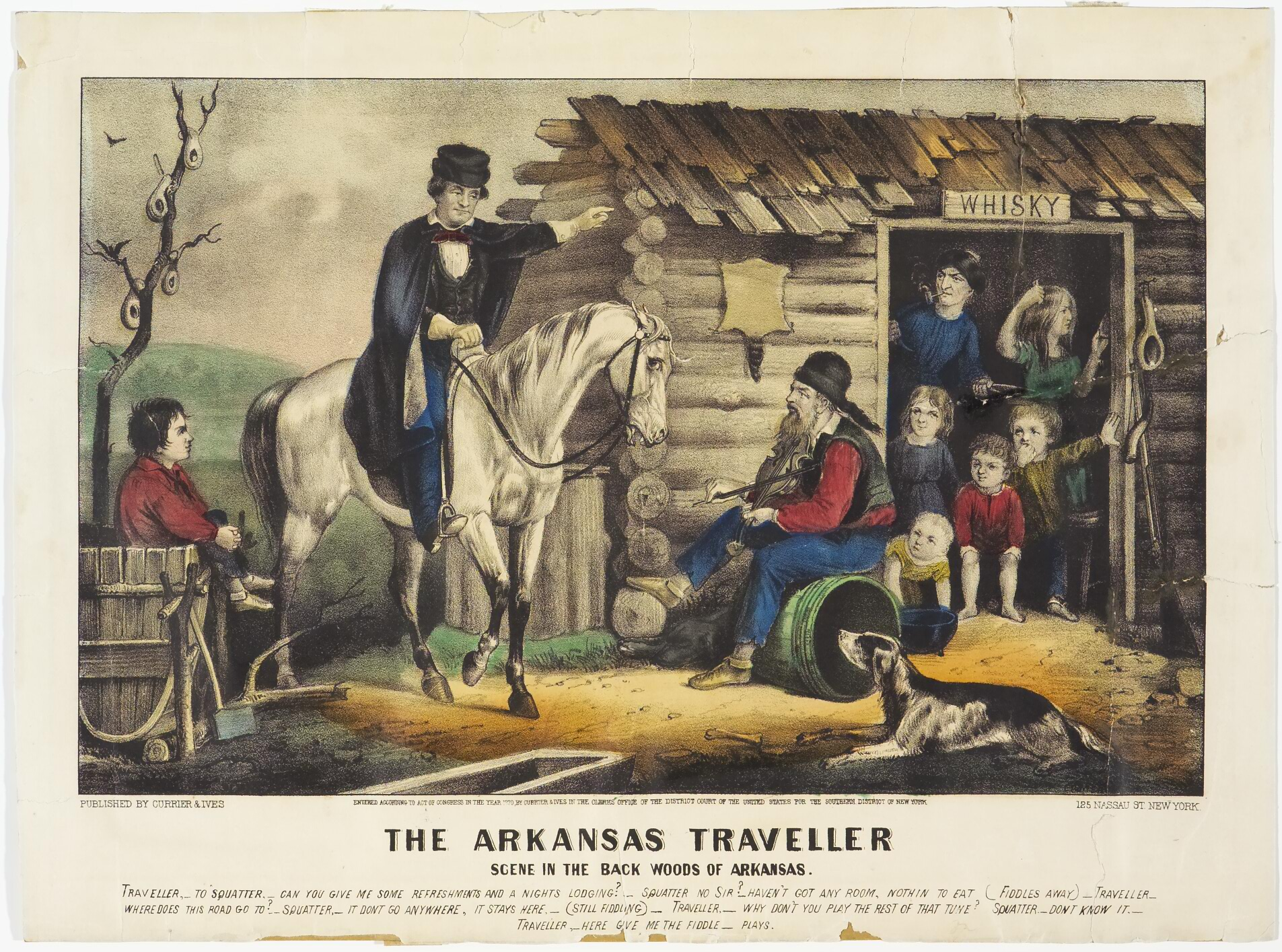
Lithography from 1870 by Currier and Ives after the painting Washburn

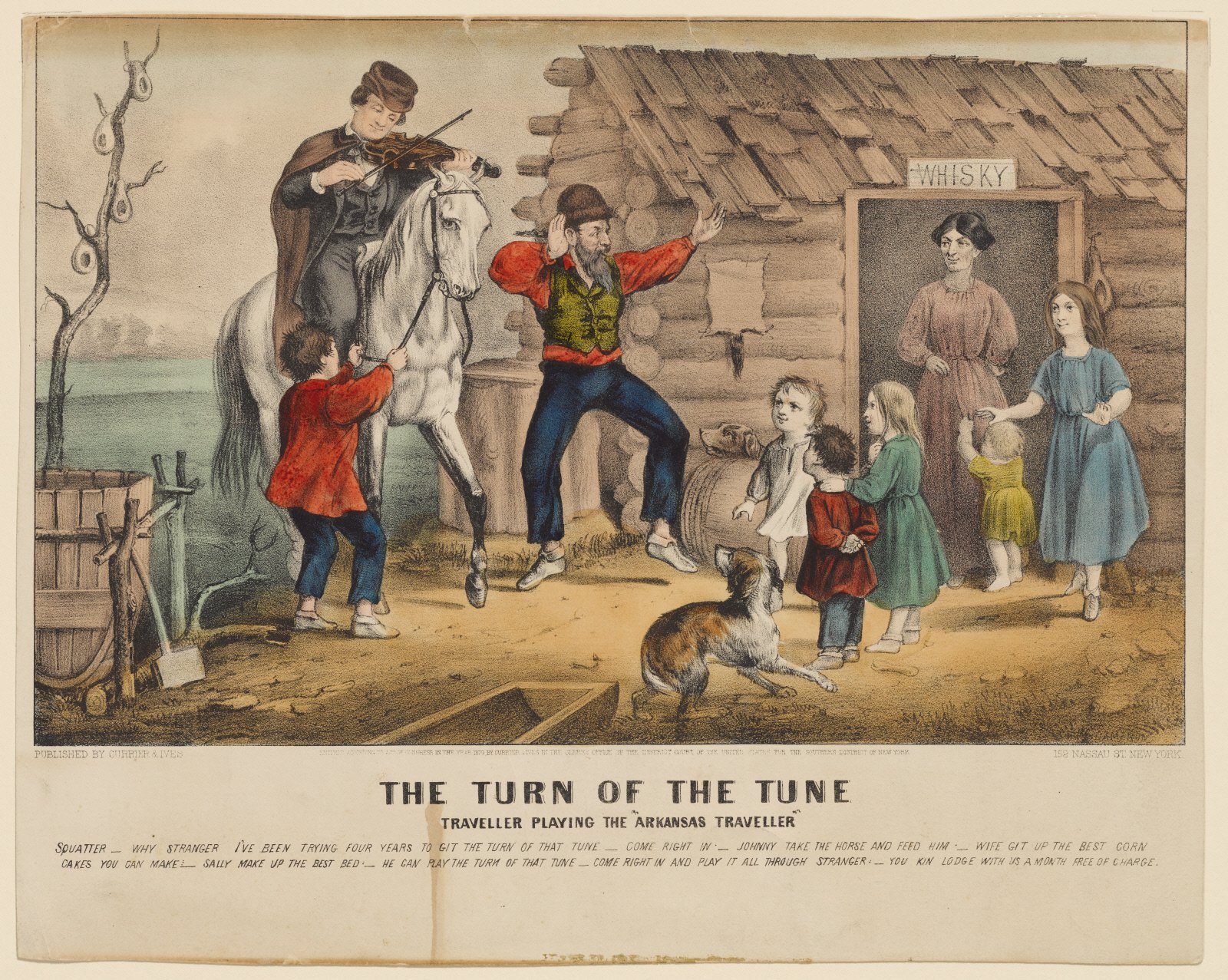
Lithography from 1870 by Currier and Ives after the painting Washburn

=== Vaudeville stage ===
"The Arkansas Traveler" was a popular comedy sketch on the vaudeville circuit. It revolved around the encounter of a (usually lost) traveling city person with a local, wise-cracking fiddle player. Various jokes at the expense of the "city slicker" were interspersed with instrumental versions of the song. In many versions, the city person is also a fiddle player, and as the sketch progresses, eventually learns the tune and plays along with the country bumpkin.

=== Music ===
A phonograph cylinder recording of the song survives, from around 1890. The contemporary singer Michelle Shocked includes a vaudeville-style version of "Arkansas Traveler" on her 1992 album of the same name. Jerry Garcia and David Grisman also do a version on their 1993 album Not for Kids Only.

=== Film ===
"The Arkansas Traveler" was frequently featured in animated cartoons in the 1930s and 1940s, most prolifically by Carl Stalling in music he composed for the Merrie Melodies and Looney Tunes series. It usually was played, sloppily, when a yokel, hillbilly, or "country bumpkin" character would appear on screen. A slow version of the "Bringing home a baby bumble-bee" version is sung by Beaky Buzzard in the short The Bashful Buzzard.

The popularity and joyfulness of "The Arkansas Traveler" was attested to in the 1932 Academy Award-winning Laurel and Hardy short, The Music Box. In this film, the boys labored to haul a player piano up a long flight of stairs and into a house through a bedroom window. Near the conclusion of their adventure, as they are starting to clean up the mess surrounding the newly installed piano, Stan and Ollie play a roll of "Patriotic Melodies". They dance with much grace and amusement to "The Arkansas Traveler", followed briefly by "Dixie". Marvin Hatley, who composed Laurel and Hardy's "Cuckoo" theme song, was the pianist for this sequence; the player piano was not real.

=== Arkansas Traveler award ===
The Arkansas Traveler Award, is an honorary title bestowed by the state on notable individuals who, through their actions serve as goodwill ambassadors for the state of Arkansas in the United States.

== Reception ==
Arkansas Traveler tale has been subject to criticism, and the tale has changed over the years. Some Arkansans have been embarrassed by the tale, because of the stereotypes of ignorant people living in the backwoods, and of 'hillbillies'.
