= David Willardson =

American animator

David Willardson is an American artist.

He attended the Art Center College of Design. He has worked on Disney characters, designing a "new look" for many of Disney's movie posters, and worked on Disney movie campaigns for 17 years.

As an award-winning illustrator in the 1970s, Willardson was instrumental in the rise of airbrush art in pop culture, leading to a prolific career in illustration and design. His work includes the covers of Ritchie Blackmore's Rainbow(1975), Jerry Lee Lewis' There Must Be More to Love Than This (1970), the soundtrack album for American Graffiti (1973), Little Richard's The Second Coming (1972) and the Refreshments' Fizzy Fuzzy Big & Buzzy (1996), as well as Rolling Stone magazine cover art and the Fender guitar poster series.

In 2007 Michelle Shocked reported that she was in a relationship with Willardson, with whom she had first worked in 2001 when he designed the branding for her record label Mighty Sound. Willardson has since designed album covers for Deep Natural and for Shocked's album reissues. Willardson and Shocked share an artist's studio in the Biscuit Company Lofts.
