= Captain Swing (album) =

Studio album by Michelle Shocked
- Released: October 1989
- Studio: Capitol Studios (Los Angeles, CA)
- Genre: Folk, blues, bebop, Dixieland
- Label: Mercury
- Producer: Pete Anderson

Michelle Shocked chronology
Short Sharp Shocked (1988)	Captain Swing (1989)	Arkansas Traveler (1991)

Professional ratings
Review scores
Source	Rating
AllMusic	3/5 stars
Robert Christgau	B

Captain Swing is a mixed genre album by American folk singer-songwriter Michelle Shocked. It was first released by Mercury Records in 1989 and later reissued by Shocked's own label Mighty Sound in 2004. It was named after Captain Swing, the pseudonymous rebel leader who penned threatening letters during the rural English Swing riots of 1830. The album was a cross-country inventory of swing musical styles—from Dixieland to Western, Big Band to BeBop.

== Track listing ==
All tracks composed by Michelle Shocked; except where indicated

1. "God Is a Real Estate Developer" (Shocked, Matt Fox) – 3:13
2. "On the Greener Side" – 2:56
3. "Silent Ways" – 2:40
4. "Sleep Keeps Me Awake" – 2:44
5. "The Cement Lament" – 3:07
6. "(Don't You Mess Around with) My Little Sister" – 2:39
7. "Looks Like Mona Lisa" – 2:32
8. "Too Little Too Late" – 2:16
9. "Streetcorner Ambassador" – 3:28
10. "Must Be Luff" – 2:45
11. "Russian Roulette" – 3:33 (hidden track)

== Personnel ==
- Michelle Shocked – vocals, acoustic guitar
- Pete Anderson – electric guitar, six-string bass guitar
- Skip Edwards – piano, Hammond organ
- Jeff Donavan – drums
- James Cruce – drums on "On the Greener Side"
- Dusty Wakeman – electric bass
- Dominic Genova – upright bass
- Lenny Castro – percussion
- Freebo (a.k.a. Daniel Friedberg) – tuba
- Zachary Richard – accordion
- Lee Thornburg – trumpet
- David Stout – trombone
- Beverly Dahlke-Smith – baritone saxophone, clarinet
- Steve Grove – tenor saxophone
- Paul Glasse – mandolin
- Don Reed – strings
- John Begzian – emulator program

=== Technical personnel ===
- Pete Anderson – producer, arrangements
- Peter Doell – engineer (Capitol Studio B)
- David Leonard – mixing engineer (Skip Sailor Recording, Sound Castle Studio, The Enterprise)
- Don Murray – mixing engineer on 8, 9 & 10.
- Charlie Paakkari – additional engineer
- Stephen Marcussen – mastering engineer (Precision Lacquered)
- Barb Hein – production assistant
- Ross Garfield – custom drums and tuning (Drum Doctor)
- Jaime Hernandez – cover art (Fantagraphics)

== Charts ==
Chart performance for Captain Swing
Chart (1989–1990)	Peak position
Australian Albums (ARIA)	58
New Zealand Albums (RMNZ)	38
UK Albums (OCC)	31
