= Arkansas Traveler (album) =

Studio album by Michelle Shocked
- Released: April 1992
- Studios: Trax Recording (Chicago, IL); Ocean Way (Hollywood, CA); Dreamland (Hurley, New York); Jack's House (Chapel Hill, NC); Windmill Lane Studios (Dublin, Ireland); The Spirit of St. Charles Riverboat (St. Charles, MO); Bill Schnee Studios (Los Angeles, CA); Sun Studio (Memphis, TN); Merle Watson Memorial Festival (Wilkesboro, NC); Bennett House Studios (Franklin, TN); Commissary Antique Store (Rising Fawn, GA); Trafalgar Studios (Annandale, Australia); Driftwood Barn (Mountain View, AR); The Piney Woods Pickin' Parlor (Mineola, TX)
- Genre: Americana
- Length: 58:47
- Label: Mercury
- Producers: Bernie Leadon; Hugh Padgham; Michelle Shocked; Don Was

Michelle Shocked chronology
Captain Swing (1989)	Arkansas Traveler (1992)	Kind Hearted Woman (1994)

Singles from Arkansas Traveler
- 1. "Come a Long Way" Released: 1992

Arkansas Traveler is an alternative folk album released by American singer-songwriter Michelle Shocked in 1992. Her fourth album for Mercury Records, the songs focused around the roots of her music. The album included collaborations with several other artists, including Taj Mahal, Alison Krauss, Tony Levin and Norman Blake. Jack Irons plays drums at the beginning of track 6. Uncle Tupelo plays on track 6. The album name may have been derived from the folklore of the Arkansas Traveler.

== Reception ==
Reviewing the album for Rolling Stone, Mark Kemp gave it four stars out of five, calling it "ambitious". William Ruhlmann of AllMusic also gave the album four stars out of five. He also found it an ambitious album, calling Shocked "feisty" and "exuberant". He also noted the album's lack of commercial success. Her desire to have the cover portray her in blackface in tribute to the roots of the music featured on the album drew criticism and led to a change in the cover art.

== Track listing ==
All tracks composed by Michelle Shocked; except where noted.

1. "33 RPM Soul" – 4:10
2. "Come a Long Way" – 4:43
3. "Secret to a Long Life" – 3:50
4. "Contest Coming (Cripple Creek)" – 3:35
5. "Over the Waterfall" – 4:39
6. "Shaking Hands (Soldier's Joy)" – 3:25
7. "Jump Jim Crow" – 3:32
8. "Hold Me Back (Frankie and Johnnie)" – 5:09
9. "Strawberry Jam" – 4:33
10. "Prodigal Daughter (Cotton Eyed Joe)" – 6:43
11. "Blackberry Blossom" – 3:31
12. "Weaving Way" – 2:57
13. "Arkansas Traveler" – 4:20
14. "Woody's Rag" (Woody Guthrie) – 2:51

== Personnel ==
- Michelle Shocked as "Prodigal Daughter" on track 10 and "Arkansas Traveler" elsewhere – guitar, mandolin, vocals
- Buddy Fambro, Mark Goldenberg, Albert Lee, Pops Staples, Jay Farrar, Taj Mahal, Doc Watson, Tim Stafford, Norman Blake, Steve Connolly, Jimmy Driftwood, Max Johnston – guitar, vocals
- Bernie Leadon – guitar, mandolin, banjo, vocals
- Hassan Kahn, Jerry Scheff, Tony Levin, Jack Herrick, Jeff Tweedy, Harold Floyd, Steve Edelman, Jon Schofield, Barry Bales – bass
- Mark O'Connor - fiddle
- Garth Hudson – accordion, keyboards
- Levon Helm – mandolin, vocals
- Chris Frank – accordion
- Bob Murphy, Michael Holmes, Peter Bull – keyboards, vocals
- Fiachna O'Braonain – guitar, vocals
- Tony Harrigan – tin whistle
- Peter O'Toole – bouzouki, bass
- Liam Ó Maonlaí – bodhrán, piano
- Leo Barnes – B3 organ, saxophone
- Bland Simpson – piano
- Mitchell Froom – B3 organ
- William T. Mason, Denny Fongheiser, Kenny Aronoff, Jerry Marotta, Jerry Fehily, Mike Heidorn, Waldo LaTowsky, Martin Parker, Michael Barclay – drums
- Jack Irons – snare

== Charts ==
Chart performance for Arkansas Traveler
Chart (1991–1992)	Peak position
Australian Albums (ARIA)	33
Canada Top Albums/CDs (RPM)	42
New Zealand Albums (RMNZ)	42
UK Albums (Official Charts)	46
