= WDET-FM =

Public radio station in Detroit

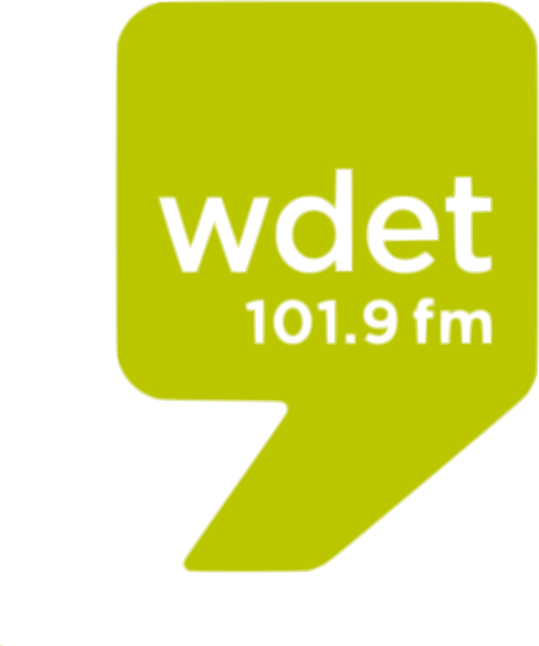
- Detroit, Michigan; United States
- Broadcast area: Metro Detroit
- Frequency: 101.9 MHz (HD Radio)
- Branding: 101.9 WDET

Programming
- Format: Public radio and talk
- Affiliations: NPR; PRX; APM

Ownership
- Owner: Wayne State University

History
- First air date: December 18, 1948
- Call sign meaning: Detroit

Technical information
- Licensing authority: FCC
- Facility ID: 71189
- Class: B
- ERP: 48,000 watts
- HAAT: 169 meters (554 ft)
- Transmitter coordinates: 42°21′6″N 83°03′48″W

Links
- Public license information: Public file; LMS
- Webcast: Listen live
- Website: wdet.org

WDET-FM (101.9 FM) is a noncommercial radio station licensed to Detroit, Michigan, United States. It is owned by Wayne State University with its studios on the first floor of the University Towers on the WSU campus on Cass Avenue and a transmitter near the campus and the intersection of Cass Avenue and Canfield Street, both in the Cass Corridor neighborhood. WDET broadcasts shows from NPR, PRX and APM. The Michigan Association of Broadcasters (MAB) named WDET the 2021 and 2022 Public Radio Station of the Year.

It is licensed to broadcast using HD Radio technology. WDET-FM's signal covers much of Southeast Michigan and part of Southwestern Ontario.

== History ==
=== United Auto Workers ===
WDET-FM was dedicated on December 18, 1948 by Governor of Michigan G. Mennen Williams and UAW president Walter Reuther, who declared that it would not be just the United Auto Worker's station but the "station of the people of Detroit." The first air date was Feb. 13, 1949. It mostly broadcast public service programs under station manager Ben Hoberman from the studios on Capital Street near Rouge Park. The station was not financially viable and the UAW-CIO sought to sell it.

=== Detroit Public Radio ===
What was then Wayne University (it joined the state university system in 1956) bought the station for one dollar in 1952 and converted it to non-commercial status. The irregular programming schedule included mainly classical music and faculty lectures.

John Buckstaff, who became general manager in 1968, developed the station's format until he resigned in 1981. Jazz, modern music, and volunteer-produced programming were added. In the early 1970s, WDET-FM began adding shows from the new public radio network, NPR, including All Things Considered and Morning Edition. There were volunteer-produced talk programs geared to a specific audience, such as Gayly Speaking and Indian to Indian. Judy Adams, who would be a music host and program director until 2005, was hired in 1974.

The conflict of programming time for niche audiences or a wider audience would be a theme for many years. Station management and volunteer producers often clashed, and the station struggled financially. Buckstaff said that the station's strength was its variety, and that "you're bound to run into something you don't like." In 1972, the station held a press conference to announce that they needed $65,000 (about $490,000 in 2024 dollars) to avoid going off the air. As of 1975, however, it was the seventh most-listened to public radio station in the country and had a record-setting pledge drive.

In May 1982, Marvin Granger became general manager. Much of the volunteer-made programming did not have a professional sound, he felt, and he cancelled many of these programs and oriented the station to a general audience. Many felt that this changing of the station's identity left some groups without a voice, but Granger stated that programs with small audiences were not financially viable. Granger and program director Judy Adams also changed the music programming focus from classical to jazz music. Granger resigned in December 1983 and news director Caryn Mathes became general manager. She would lead the station until February 2005.

The listening audience greatly expanded in the 1980s, along with revenue. In 1983, Ed Love, Ann Delisi, Martin Bandyke and Ralph Valdez were hired as music hosts. In 1984, Adams continued jazz programming during the weekday while adding blues/folk shows on Saturdays and classical shows on Sundays. By 1986, the station had expanded its musical programming to include Dave Dixon's daily weekday program of rock and eclectic music.

Weekday music variety programs became a driver of listenership during the 1990s. Martin Bandyke began a daily show in September 1991. Dave Dixon's show ended in February 1992 and Ann Delisi took over his time slot. Besides bluegrass, folk, blues and classical programs on the weekends, Ismael Ahmed's world music show was on by 1991. By 1993, 150,000 listeners per week were listening, considered healthy for a public radio station.

The departure of music director Ann Delisi in 1995 prompted further changes to the weekday lineup. Judy Adams's program began to air between 9 AM and noon, then Martin Bandyke's program aired until the afternoon NPR programs. Ed Love's program aired between 7 PM and 10 PM. By 1996, Ralph Valdez at 10 PM and Liz Warner (née Copeland) at midnight both hosted eclectic music programs.

=== Controversial changes ===
WDET was in turmoil between 2004 and 2007, with frequent programming changes that caused controversy. The first wave of changes came on September 17, 2004, when weekday music programs were expanded in place of NPR programs The Tavis Smiley Show and Fresh Air. General manager Caryn Mathes stated that this would bolster the station’s mission of “contemporary adult music.” One of the more controversial changes was the cancellation of Matt Watroba’s Folks Like Us and Larry McDaniel’s Arkansas Traveler programs. These were long-running Saturday folk and bluegrass shows that management felt were too niche. Later that year, Mathes accepted a position at WAMU in Washington, D.C. and remained at WDET until February 2005.

Michael Coleman, former general manager of Michigan Public, became general manager during summer 2005. Under his leadership, the station transitioned to a mostly news and talk format. The station had been operating in a financial deficit, and Coleman aimed to grow the audience by better balancing news and music. He cut many local music programs, outraging listeners who had donated to fund those programs. Martin Bandyke’s program was the first to end. Bandyke resigned amidst allegations that he “trafficked in recorded music and accepted free concert tickets in violation of WSU policy,” according to the Detroit Free Press. It had been common and accepted to exchange promotional CDs at record stores for the benefit of the station’s music library under Caryn Mathes. He was off the air in November and resigned in December.

Although listeners celebrated the reinstatement of Matt Watroba and Larry McDaniels’ weekend programs, the removal of weekday music in December 2005 was met with an overwhelmingly negative response and caused harm to Detroit’s music scene. As stated in the Detroit Free Press:

WDET had made its musical mark with a loose, spirited approach that snubbed traditional notions of public radio snobbery and took cues from the freewheeling programming of old-school FM stations such as Detroit’s classic WABX… The station’s transformation left lingering effects on the local landscape, many say, including difficulty selling certain concerts, developing certain artists and maintaining a sense of community.

Coleman’s changes caused a drop in revenue and listenership, prompting the layoff of four staffers in May 2006. The station saw a 31 percent drop in its audience. To protest the change to talk programming during the weekday, Los Lobos cancelled its live performance scheduled for the pledge drive that spring. In March 2006, Coleman was charged with embezzlement from Michigan Public, for which he ultimately pleaded no contest. Over the Christmas holiday, Coleman packed up his office and resigned from WDET without notifying his staff in advance. A month later, he joined LGBTQ nonprofit Affirmations as development director.

Allen Mazurek, program director and acting general manager, further removed music programs in April 2007. He stated that Wayne State University wanted the station to have more talk programs, and be the “public affairs and information voice for the Detroit area.” Shows hosted by Liz Copeland, W. Kim Heron, Ralph Valdez, Mick Collins and Chuck Horn were removed, while the Ed Love Program and weekend blues, folk, and world music programs remained. Craig Fahle became the permanent host of Detroit Today, the station's daily public affairs program, that September.

==== 2008 to present ====
In December 2008, J. Mikel Ellcessor became general manager. Ann Delisi, who had resigned in March 1995, returned to WDET as a music host in February 2009. Saturday folk and blues programs were once again cancelled in early 2010, replaced with two shows by Rob Reinhart, the syndicated Acoustic Café and Rob Reinhart's Essential Music.

When Ellcessor resigned in 2013, Craig Fahle and Michelle Sbinovich shared the general manager duties, with Sbinovich assuming sole leadership in 2014. Detroit Free Press editorialist Stephen Henderson began hosting the station's daily talk show in March 2015. With Culture Shift, an afternoon music variety program, weekday music returned in July 2016.

Present general manager Mary Zatina assumed leadership on January 2, 2020. She, with program director Adam Fox, added several hours of local music and talk to the schedule as of February 5, 2024. Zatina stated that as of 2025, the audience has increased by 21 percent since the changes.

==== Current programming ====
On weekdays, WDET-FM produces a two-hour talk program, The Metro with Tia Graham and Robyn Vincent. There are five hours of local music programming each day. Ryan Patrick Hooper has hosted an afternoon music variety program since joining Culture Shift. It was renamed In the Groove when Hooper took over as the only host in 2024. Evening programs follow a weekly rotation, with Don Was notably hosting a show with Ann Delisi on Friday nights. These are in addition to NPR flagship programs Morning Edition, All Things Considered, and Fresh Air, along with Marketplace, On Point, and The Daily.

On weekends, syndicated public radio programs are heard until 11 AM, then local music programs air for the rest of the day and evening. Music variety programs include Ann Delisi's Essential Music, Rob Reinhart's Essential Music, Segues with Ralph Valdez, Modern Music with Jon Moshier, and Acoustic Café (a syndicated program by WDET host Rob Reinhart). Programs specializing in hip-hop, electronica, rhythm and blues, world music, and dream pop can also be heard.

==== Detroit Radio Information Service ====
The Detroit Radio Information Service (DRIS) broadcasts on a subcarrier of WDET. People with visual impairments use a special receiver loaned to them by the station to hear local news read by volunteers. The frequency also carries a national program of readings from newspapers such as the New York Times and Wall Street Journal.

== Studios ==
In May 1960, WDET began broadcasting from the 15th floor of the Maccabees Building near the Wayne State University campus. Their new studio had previously been used by WXYZ radio. The cramped space, named Back Alley Studios, was too small to house the management staff. They worked from an old house on campus.

The broadcast facilities in the Maccabees Building were considered "unhealthy and dangerous" and the station began planning improvements. On November 29 1985, the studio was damaged by an electrical fire and thousands of records were destroyed. The studio was cleaned and repaired, and the station was off the air for less than a day. A new studio was custom-built on the first floor of 6001 Cass Ave and it became WDET's home in September 1987.

WDET's antenna remained attached to the tower atop the Maccabees Building, which was then owned by Detroit Public Schools Community District. When the antenna began to fail, the university claimed that the tower's condition was too poor to hang a new antenna on. The dispute over who would pay to repair the tower was ultimately resolved when WDET chose to build its own tower. In 1995, WDET began using its new tower on Canfield Street. Nearby, the new University Towers residence hall would house the station's new studios, opening around summer 1996.

== Broadcast transmitter ==
WDET transmits from a tower at 554 feet (169 meters) in height above average terrain (HAAT) near the intersection of Cass Avenue and Canfield Street near the Wayne State University campus. WDET broadcasts with an effective radiated power (ERP) of 48,000 watts, so it is grandfathered at slightly more power than would be permitted today in the Detroit area, for its HAAT. According to the FCC, the same antenna height setup if being newly licensed today would only be allotted 39,000 watts.

A failed air conditioner damaged the transmitter during the summer of 2020. The backup transmitter had poor sound quality and a fundraising campaign was begun to replace the equipment. The Kresge Foundation helped fund the new transmitter (a Nautel GV30N) which went on the air in October 2021.
