= The Texas Campfire Tapes =

Album by Michelle Shocked

Live album by Michelle Shocked
- Released: 1986
- Venues: Kerrville Folk Festival, Texas
- Genre: Folk
- Label: Cooking Vinyl
- Producer: Pete Lawrence

Michelle Shocked chronology
| The Texas Campfire Tapes (1986) | Short Sharp Shocked (1988) |

Professional ratings
Review scores
| Source | Rating |
|---|---|
| AllMusic | 3.5/5 stars |
| Robert Christgau | B+ |
| The Encyclopedia of Popular Music | 3/5 stars |
| MusicHound Rock: The Essential Album Guide | 3/5 stars |
| The Rolling Stone Album Guide | 1.5/5 stars |
| Spin Alternative Record Guide | 7/10 |

The Texas Campfire Tapes is the first album by American singer and songwriter Michelle Shocked. The album was recorded on a Sony Walkman during an impromptu set performed by Shocked around a campfire at the Kerrville Folk Festival in Texas; the recording was made by Pete Lawrence, founder of the Cooking Vinyl label, on his first visit to the US. It was then released by Cooking Vinyl in 1986 and Shocked moved over to Europe to support and promote the album, which was subsequently released by Mercury Records. The album reached the top spot on the British independent record chart. It was remastered and reissued in 2003 as a two-CD set called Texas Campfire Takes by Shocked's own label, Mighty Sound.

Another version of "Fogtown" appears as a "hidden track" on Shocked's breakthrough album Short Sharp Shocked (1988), where she is backed by the hardcore punk band MDC.

== Critical reception ==
Robert Christgau wrote that Shocked "has a reporter's eye and a tale-spinner's ear". Trouser Press called Shocked "an uncertain but ambitious singer whose early style was a weave of jazz, blues and rock’n’roll as much as folk, she comes off as a talented amateur with modestly appealing songs and the hint of substantial potential."

== Track listing ==
All tracks composed by Michelle Shocked, except where indicated

=== Original Album ===
1. "5 A.M. in Amsterdam"
2. "The Secret Admirer"
3. "The Incomplete Image"
4. "Who Cares?"
5. "Down on Thomas St"
6. "Fogtown"
7. "Steppin' Out"
8. "The Hep Cat"
9. "Necktie"
10. "(Don't you mess around with) My Little Sister"
11. "The Ballad of Patch Eye and Meg"
12. "The Secret to a Long Life (is knowing when it's time to go)"

=== 2003 Mighty Sound CD reissue (Disk two) ===
1. "5 A.M. in Amsterdam"
2. "Fogtown"
3. "4/4 Troubador"
4. "Steppin' Out"
5. "Hold Me Back"
6. "Fool for Cocaine"
7. "Down on Thomas St"/ "Hardly Gonna Miss Him"
8. "Hep Cat"
9. "Necktie"
10. "My Little Sister"
11. "Patcheye and Meg"
12. "Secret to a Long Life"
13. "When I Grow Up"
14. "Ghost Town"
15. "Secret Admirer"
16. "Black Widow"
17. "Chain Smoker"
18. "Old Time Feeling"
19. "Stranded in a Limousine" (Paul Simon)
20. "Goodnight, Irene" (Huddie Ledbetter/Traditional)
21. "C.C. Rider" (Gertrude "Ma" Rainey, Lena Arant)
22. "Contest Coming"
23. "Lagniappe"/"Memories of East Texas"
