= Edward Washburn =

American painter

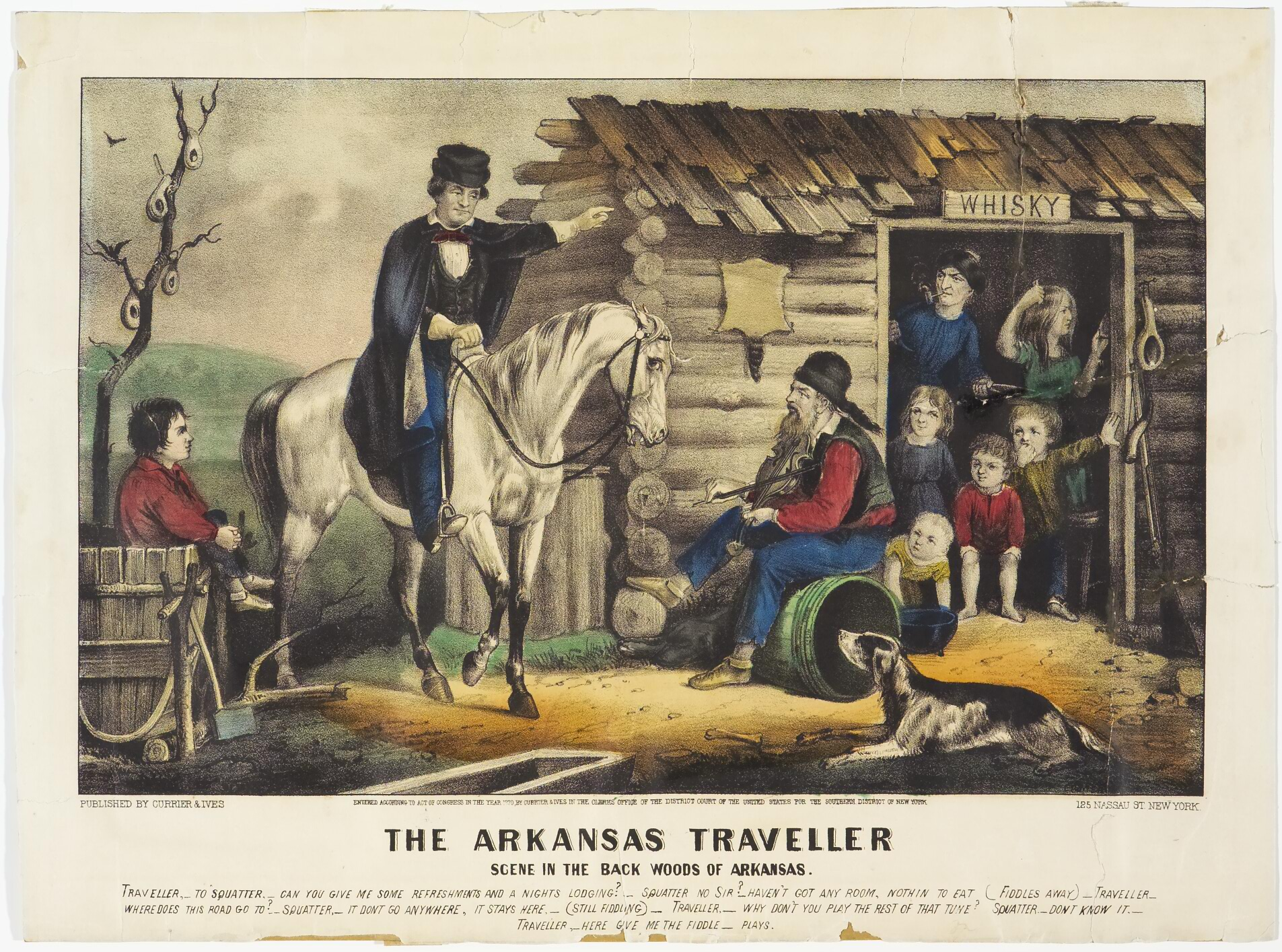
The Arkansas Traveller. Scene in the Back Woods of Arkansas, lithograph by Currier and Ives, 1870

Edward Payson Washburn (1831 – March 26, 1860) also known as Edward Payson Washbourne, was an American painter. He was the son of Christian missionary Cephas Washburn. He is best known for his painting, The Arkansas Traveller (1856). During the Antebellum era, he was one of the most notable painters in the state of Arkansas.

== Biography ==
Edward Payson Washburn painted the image of the "Arkansas Traveler" in 1856, from a story he heard from Colonel Sandford C. Faulkner. Supposedly occurring on the campaign trail in Arkansas in 1840, Colonel Faulkner's humorous story ends with a fiddle playing squatter being won over by the traveler (man on horse in image).

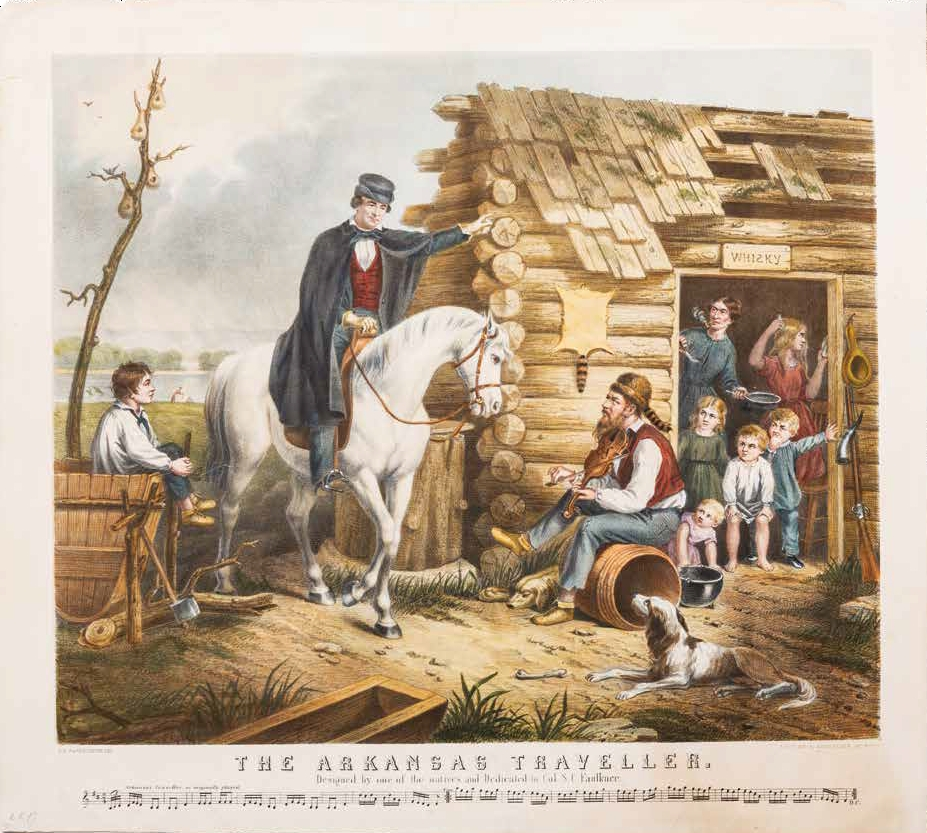
The Arkansas Traveller—Leopold Grozelier (lithographer), J.H. Bufford (publisher), Boston, Massachusetts, c. 1859

The painting was later a basis of engravings by Leopold Grozelier of Boston in 1859, and Currier and Ives of New York City about 1870, with a sample from the Arkansas Traveler tune. In addition to the painting and prints, the story of the Arkansas Traveler was also turned into a tune, dialogue and play.

It was created south of present-day Russellville, Arkansas at the Washburn family homestead site near Norristown. Washburn cemetery, near the old homestead, still exists today. The painting was widely distributed as a Currier & Ives lithograph. It was inspired by the composition of the same name by Colonel Sanford C. Faulkner (1806–1874).

Washburn died in Little Rock, Arkansas, only nine days after his father, and is buried at Mount Holly Cemetery.
