= A Short, Sharp Shock =

Fantasy novel by Kim Stanley Robinson

- First edition
- Author: Kim Stanley Robinson
- Cover artist: Arnie Fenner
- Language: English
- Genre: Fantasy novel
- Publisher: Mark V. Ziesing
- Publication date: 1990
- Publication place: United States
- Media type: Print (Hardback & Paperback)
- ISBN: 978-0-929-48018-3

A Short, Sharp Shock (also known as Short, Sharp Shock) is a 1990 fantasy novel by Kim Stanley Robinson. The plot concerns a man who wakes with no memory in a strange land, and he journeys through it to find the woman who he woke alongside.

His journey takes him along the narrow strip of land, surrounded by ocean, that constitutes the entire world.

The phrase "short, sharp shock" is taken from the comic opera The Mikado, by the Victorian-era theatrical partnership Gilbert and Sullivan.
