= Kind Hearted Woman =

Studio album by Michelle Shocked
- Released: 1996
- Studios: The Village Recorder (Santa Monica, CA)
- Label: Private Music
- Producer: Bones Howe

Michelle Shocked chronology
Kind Hearted Woman (1994)	Kind Hearted Woman (1996)	Mercury Poise (1996)

Kind Hearted Woman is an album by the American musician Michelle Shocked, released in 1996. It is a rerecording of her 1994 album, which was sold at her concerts. The album was released by Private Music, after Mercury Records declined to release any further Shocked albums. Shocked eventually disentangled herself from Mercury, and was able to take all of her masters with her. Shocked supported the album by touring with her band, the Casualties of Wah.

== Production ==
The album was produced by Bones Howe. Members of Hothouse Flowers backed Shocked on the rerecording. Kind Hearted Woman was inspired by the death of Shocked's grandmother, most specifically on "Fever Breaks". Three of its songs were originally written for a dance performance.

== Critical reception ==
Professional ratings
Review scores
Source	Rating
AllMusic	3.5/5 stars
Robert Christgau	(dud)
Los Angeles Daily News	4/4 stars
Los Angeles Times	3/4 stars
MusicHound Rock: The Essential Album Guide	4.5/5 stars
Spin	7/10

Spin wrote that Shocked is "curious about all the musics of America, wants to feel each texture by hand, without sounding blithely postmodern." The Los Angeles Times stated that "the songs range from angular acoustic rock to barroom swing to country pop, occasionally recalling alterna-divas Kristin Hersh and Johnette Napolitano." The Sun-Sentinel concluded that "stripped-down arrangements and a clear haunting vocal style, ripe with folkish mannerisms and strange countrified rhythms, keep Shocked visions crystalline as icicles."

The Los Angeles Daily News noted that, "while her hauntingly beautiful delivery is sometimes reserved, it is mostly marked by the ebullience of a woman on the edge." The Santa Fe New Mexican deemed the album "a darkly sensuous work of thrilling depth and compassion." The St. Louis Post-Dispatch determined that "these thoroughly grim folk songs set in rural mid-America are remarkable for their clarity and intelligence."

AllMusic wrote that, "like Bruce Springsteen on his Nebraska album, Shocked was concerned with what sounded like Depression-era issues of poverty and hard times in the heartland."

== Track listing ==
No.	Title	Length
1.	"Stillborn"
2.	"Homestead"
3.	"Winter Wheat"
4.	"Cold Comfort"
5.	"Eddie"
6.	"A Child Like Grace"
7.	"Fever Breaks"
8.	"Silver Spoon"
9.	"The Hard Way"
10.	"No Sign of Rain"
