= Arkansas (You Run Deep in Me) =

"Arkansas (You Run Deep in Me)" by Wayland Holyfield is one of the official state songs of Arkansas. It was written by Holyfield in 1986 for the state's 150th-anniversary celebration and was named an official "state song" by the Arkansas General Assembly in 1987. Holyfield played the song at the inauguration of President Bill Clinton in 1993.

Other official Arkansas state songs are "Arkansas", state anthem (state song before 1949 and from 1963 to 1987); "Oh, Arkansas", also written for the state's 150th birthday in 1986, and likewise designated "state song" in 1987; and "The Arkansas Traveler", state historical song (state song from 1949 to 1963). The song was used since its release as part on the daily sign-on and sign-off procedures of Arkansas Educational Television Network, documented as early as 1988.
