= Arkansas (song) =

One of the official state songs of Arkansas

"Arkansas", written by Eva Ware Barnett in 1916, is one of the official state songs of Arkansas. It was first adopted as the state song in the early 20th century but was removed in 1949 due to a copyright dispute. After the state settled the dispute by buying all claims to its copyright, it was restored as state song in 1963.

In 1987, the General Assembly elevated the song to "state anthem" in order to designate "Arkansas (You Run Deep In Me)" and "Oh, Arkansas", both written for the state's 150th birthday in 1986, as state songs; it also designated "The Arkansas Traveler", the state song from 1949 to 1963, as "state historical song".

Another 1987 law requires the Secretary of State to respond to all requests for copies of the "state song" with this song. However, this was done only to preserve the historical status of this song; all four songs are either copyrighted by the state itself or in the public domain. Today, the Secretary of State posts the lyrics to all four songs on its website.
