= Oh, Arkansas =

State Song of Arkansas

- State song of Arkansas
- Lyrics: Terry Rose, Gary Klaff, Mark Weinstein, 1986
- Music: Terry Rose, 1986
- Adopted: 1987; 39 years ago

"Oh, Arkansas" by Terry Rose, Gary Klaff, and Mark Weinstein is one of the official state songs of Arkansas. It was written in 1986 for the state's 150th-anniversary celebration. It was named an official "state song" by the Arkansas General Assembly in 1987 with legislation spearheaded by Representative Bill Stephens.

Other official Arkansas state songs are "Arkansas", the state anthem (state song before 1949 and from 1963 to 1987); "Arkansas (You Run Deep In Me)", also written for the state's 150th birthday in 1986, and likewise designated "state song" in 1987; and "The Arkansas Traveler", state historical song (state song from 1949 to 1963).
