= Short Sharp Shocked =

Studio album by Michelle Shocked
- Released: August 15, 1988
- Recorded: 1988
- Studios: Capitol (Hollywood); Larrabee (North Hollywood); Sound Castle (Los Angeles)
- Genre: Folk punk
- Length: 36:27
- Label: Mercury
- Producer: Pete Anderson

Michelle Shocked chronology
The Texas Campfire Tapes (1986)	Short Sharp Shocked (1988)	Captain Swing (1989)

Singles from Short Sharp Shocked
- 1. "Anchorage" Released: 1988; 2. "If Love Was a Train" Released: December 19, 1988; 3. "When I Grow Up" Released: 1989

2003 reissue cover

Short Sharp Shocked is the debut studio album by American singer-songwriter Michelle Shocked, released in 1988 by Mercury Records. It was remastered and reissued in 2003 as a two-CD set by Shocked's own label, Mighty Sound.

== Artwork ==
The title Short Sharp Shocked is a play on the phrase "short, sharp shock". The photograph of Shocked that appears on the album cover was taken by Chris Hardy of the San Francisco Examiner at a protest in San Francisco during the 1984 Democratic National Convention. The front cover of the 2003 reissue decontextualized the original photograph by closely cropping it to Shocked's face, but the back cover features it in full, with the restraining officer's eyes not obscured by airbrushed-on sunglasses like the front cover of the original Mercury release.

The title and cover image are similar to those of the 1984 album Short Sharp Shock by the English punk rock band Chaos UK, who would respond by titling their 1989 album The Chipping Sodbury Bonfire Tapes after Shocked's 1986 album The Texas Campfire Tapes.

== Reception ==
Professional ratings
Review scores
Source	Rating
AllMusic	5/5 stars
Chicago Sun-Times	3.5/4 stars
Los Angeles Times	3.5/4 stars
NME	8/10
The Philadelphia Inquirer	4/4 stars
Q	4/5 stars
Record Mirror	4/5
Rolling Stone	3.5/5 stars
Spin Alternative Record Guide	8/10
The Village Voice	A−

Q magazine's Robert Sandall wrote, "Where this album hits hardest is in the playful unpredictability of [Pete] Anderson and Shocked's arrangements," and observed, "'When I Grow Up' ... introduces a jazzy, acoustic bass shuffle, then starts bouncing miscellaneous sound inserts around beneath the vocal. From here, it's pretty much all stops to the thrash metal finale at the end of side two." Including the album in its best-of-the-year round-up, Q commented, "Her excellent band revels in every opportunity she gives to cut loose and take chances, which heightens the spontaneous feel of her raggedy vocals. Second albums can often be a disappointment, but this is a firecracker." Short Sharp Shocked was voted the fifth-best album of 1988 in The Village Voice's year-end Pazz & Jop critics' poll.

Retrospectively, Rolling Stone critic Adrian Zupp described Short Sharp Shocked as Shocked's "high-water mark" and, with its "confluence of home-grown musical styles", her "tribute to her geo-cultural roots and, inadvertently, her own uniqueness."

== Track listing ==
All songs written by Michelle Shocked except as noted. The final track is a remake of "Fogtown", originally from The Texas Campfire Tapes, with punk band MDC. It was not listed on the sleeve or disc of the original release, as Shocked "wanted it to surprise people".

Original album
No.	Title	Writer(s)	Length
1.	"When I Grow Up"		3:34
2.	"Hello Hopeville"		2:55
3.	"Memories of East Texas"		3:35
4.	"(Making the Run to) Gladewater"		3:05
5.	"Graffiti Limbo"		3:39
6.	"If Love Was a Train"		4:07
7.	"Anchorage"		3:24
8.	"The L&N Don't Stop Here Anymore"	Jean Ritchie	4:10
9.	"V.F.D."		2:49
10.	"Black Widow"		2:44
11.	"Fogtown" (with MDC)		2:25

2003 reissue bonus CD
No.	Title	Writer(s)	Length
1.	"When I Grow Up" (demo, with Sophia Ramos)		3:16
2.	"Memories of East Texas" (live at the Metroplex, Atlanta)		5:46
3.	"Yamboree Queen" (live at the Metroplex, Atlanta)		4:25
4.	"Strawberry Jam" (live at either the Metroplex, Atlanta, or somewhere in London)		4:07
5.	"Graffiti Limbo" (demo, with Sophia Ramos)		4:27
6.	"If Love was a Train" (live in-store, London)		3:31
7.	"Anchorage" (live, Twee Meter radio session, Hilversum, Holland)		4:14
8.	"The L&N Don't Stop Here Anymore" (Kerrville demo)	Jean Ritchie	4:09
9.	"V.F.D." (live at the Metroplex, Atlanta)		2:56
10.	"Black Widow" (alternative version, unknown source)		4:11
11.	"Leaving Louisiana in the Broad Daylight" (Andy Kershaw Session, BBC)	Donivan Cowart/Rodney Crowell	3:23
12.	"Disoriented" (UK 7" single)		4:14
13.	"Lovely Rita" (from the UK compilation Sgt. Pepper Knew My Father)	John Lennon/Paul McCartney	2:19
14.	"The Ballad of Penny Evans" (live at the Glastonbury CND Festival, 1987)	Steve Goodman	3:39
15.	"Remodeling (sic) the Pentagon" (live at the Glastonbury CND Festival, 1987)		2:27
16.	"Fred's Winter Song" (Andy Kershaw Session, BBC)		3:21
17.	"Prince of Darkness" (with The Mekons, John Peel Session, BBC)	The Mekons	2:59
18.	"One Piece at a Time" (from the UK compilation ‘Til Things Are Brighter)	Wayne Kemp	3:36
19.	"5 A.M. in Amsterdam" (live at the Paradiso, Amsterdam)		4:17
20.	"Campus Crusade" (live at the Paradiso, Amsterdam)		5:13
21.	"Goodnight Irene" (live at the Paradiso, Amsterdam)	Huddie Ledbetter	3:13

== Personnel ==
- Michelle Shocked – vocals, acoustic guitar
- Pete Anderson – electric guitar, six-string bass guitar on "Hello Hopeville"
- Jeff Donavan – drums
- Dominic Genova – acoustic bass, electric bass
- Skip Edwards – piano, Hammond organ
- Michael Tempo – percussion
- Al Perkins – dobro
- Byron Berline – mandolin
- Don Reed – fiddle
- Rod Piazza – harmonica
- Kristina Olsen – hammered dulcimer
- Banjo Jim Croce – banjo
- Sophia Ramos – vocals
- MDC – vocals on "Fogtown"

Technical personnel

- Pete Anderson – arrangements
- Peter Doell – engineer (Capitol Studio B)
- Leslie Anne Jones – additional Engineering
- David Leonard – mixing engineer (Larribee Sound)
- Andy Batwinds – second engineer
- Bobby Lacivita – second engineer (Sound Castle)
- Eddy Schreyer – mastering engineer (Capitol Studios)
- Michael Dumds – production assistant

== Charts ==
=== Album ===
Chart performance for Short Sharp Shocked
Chart (1988)	Peak position
Australian Albums (Australian Music Report)	46
Dutch Albums (Album Top 100)	79
German Albums (Offizielle Top 100)	57
New Zealand Albums (RMNZ)	20
Swedish Albums (Sverigetopplistan)	37
Swiss Albums (Schweizer Hitparade)	24
UK Albums (Official Charts)	33
US The Billboard 200	73

=== Singles ===
Chart performance for singles from Short Sharp Shocked
Year	Song	Chart	Peak position
1988	"Anchorage"	Billboard Modern Rock Tracks	16
1988	"Anchorage"	Billboard Hot 100	66
1988	"If Love Was a Train"	Billboard Mainstream Rock Tracks	33
1988	"If Love Was a Train"	Billboard Modern Rock Tracks	20
1989	"Anchorage"	Australian Music Report	51
1989	"When I Grow Up"	UK Singles Chart	67

== Certifications ==
Region	Certification	Certified units/sales
Canada (Music Canada)	Gold	50,000^{^}
^{^} Shipments figures based on certification alone.
