= Michelle Shocked =

American singer-songwriter

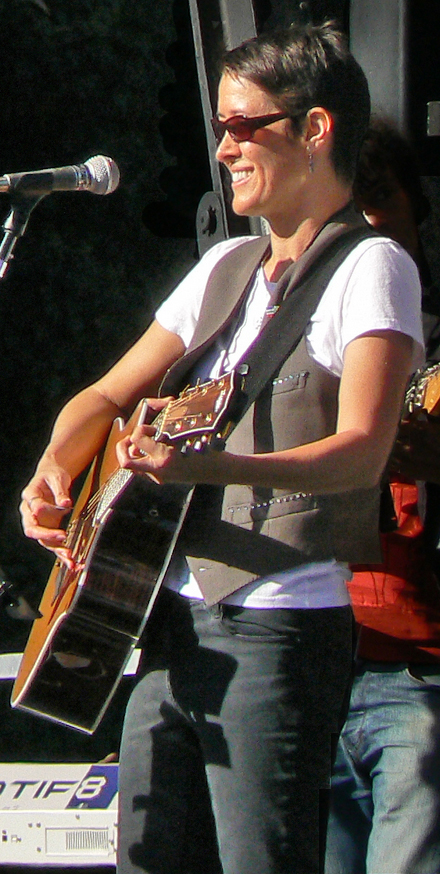
- Shocked at Hardly Strictly Bluegrass, 2007

Background information
- Born: Karen Michelle Johnston; February 24, 1962 (age 64)
- Origin: Dallas, Texas, U.S.
- Genre: Alternative folk
- Occupations: Musician; songwriter
- Instruments: Vocals; guitar
- Labels: Mercury; PolyGram; Private Music
- Website: michelleshocked.com

Michelle Shocked (born Karen Michelle Johnston; February 24, 1962) is an American singer-songwriter. Her music has entered the Billboard Hot 100, been nominated for the Grammy Award for Best Contemporary Folk Album, and received an award for Folk Album of the Year at the CMJ New Music Awards.

== Early life ==
Shocked was born Karen Michelle Johnston on February 24, 1962, in Dallas, Texas, at the Baylor University Medical Center. Her stepfather was in the US Army and the family moved from base to base, eventually settling in Gilmer, Texas. She was raised in a Mormon family. Johnston went through a punk rock phase, wearing a Mohawk hairdo and squatting in abandoned buildings in San Francisco, California.

== Career ==
In 1984, Johnston adopted the stage name "Michelle Shocked", a play on the expression "shell shocked", she said in a 1992 interview with Green Left Weekly: "The term 'Miss shell shocked' is a direct reference to the thousand-yard stare, which was a term that they first used to describe the victims of shell-shock in World War I. I first used that name in 1984 at the Democratic Convention in San Francisco where I was arrested for protesting and demonstrating against corporations who contribute money to both the Democratic Party and the Republican Party campaigns."

Shocked received her first international exposure after Pete Lawrence recorded her performance on a portable tape recorder at the Kerrville Folk Festival in Texas. Lawrence released the tape in Europe as The Texas Campfire Tapes (1986) (later released as The Texas Campfire Takes). The album's success brought major labels asking her to sign a contract. Shocked was resistant to what she saw as the machinations of the music industry, and worked to retain a degree of creative control.

=== Mercury trilogy ===
Her first US success came with the release of her 1988 debut album, Short Sharp Shocked, on college radio rotations around the country, which was met with strong acclaim from listeners. The debut single, "Anchorage", charted on the Billboard Hot 100, but a follow-up single from the album, "When I Grow Up", did not chart. Short Sharp Shocked was the first album in what Shocked later described as a "trilogy" for Mercury Records.

The second album in the trilogy, Captain Swing, was released in 1989. Described by reviewer Chris Woodstra as an album of "swing and big-band music" that "no one expected", the album was promoted with the release of "On the Greener Side", whose music video is a gender-reversed parody of Robert Palmer's 1986 video for "Addicted to Love", in which topless male models performed the motions made famous by the female models in Palmer's video.

The trilogy concluded with her 1992 album, Arkansas Traveler. Her desire to have the cover portray her in blackface in tribute to the roots of the music featured on the album drew criticism and a change in the cover art. However, the album received little commercial notice, and Shocked parted ways with the label following an acrimonious lawsuit.

=== Post-Mercury years ===
In 1995, Shocked contributed an original song to the soundtrack for the film Dead Man Walking called "Quality of Mercy". In 1996, she released a studio version of Kind Hearted Woman on the short-lived Private Music label.

Starting in 2002 with the release of Deep Natural, Shocked established her own label, Mighty Sound. She reissued expanded versions of her entire catalog, made possible by having retained complete ownership of her work when she signed with Mercury in 1987.

An acoustic version of her song "How You Play the Game" was featured as the opening and credits soundtrack on the DVD of the 2004 documentary film Bush's Brain.

Shocked continued to make music as an independent artist. In June 2005, she released a trilogy of albums called Threesome (Don't Ask Don't Tell, Mexican Standoff and Got No Strings). In May 2007, she released the album ToHeavenURide; and in September 2009, Soul of My Soul.

Soul of My Soul remains Shocked's last released recording to date. She toured consistently through 2013, then took time off before resuming live performances and touring in 2016.

Shocked is a vocal critic of Spotify and its low pay rates for artists, declaring that "None of my music will be on there until they commit to a sustainable rate rather than suing songwriters." She has also refused to allow her music to be on iTunes, YouTube, or Amazon Music.

== Personal life ==
Shocked's younger brother is the musician and multi-instrumentalist Max Johnston, of Uncle Tupelo, Wilco and the Gourds.

In 1992, Shocked married journalist Bart Bull. They divorced in 2004. She reported in 2007 that she was in a relationship with Disney artist David Willardson, with whom she had first worked in 2001 when he designed the branding for her record label Mighty Sound. Willardson has since designed album covers for Deep Natural and for Shocked's album reissues. Willardson and Shocked share an artist's studio in the Biscuit Company Lofts.

=== Sexuality ===
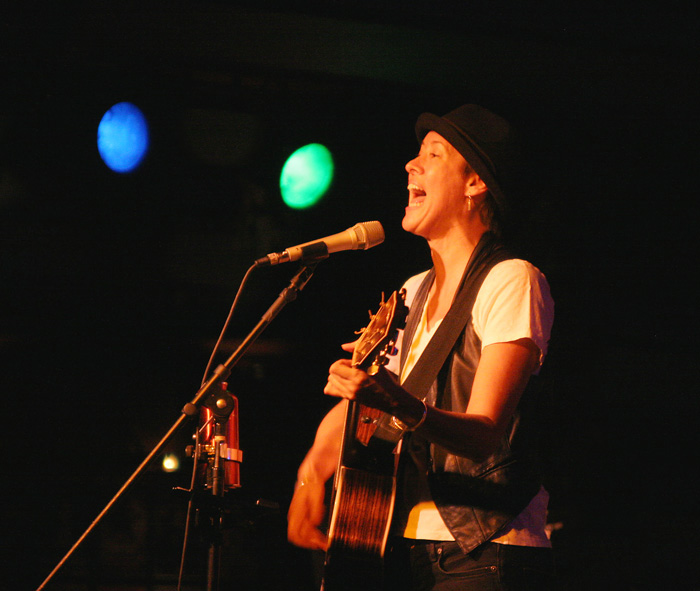
Shocked performing in 2010

According to Gay 100 author Paul Russell, in 1989 she joked to a US broadcast television audience that the Grammy award for Best Contemporary Folk Recording, whose nominees included herself, eventual winner Tracy Chapman, Phranc, and Indigo Girls, should have been called "Best Lesbian Vocalist". Shocked herself remembers that she joked the award "could have been called 'They Might Be Lesbians'".

After an Earth Day performance in Chicago in April 1990, she gave an interview to Christie L. Nordhielm of Outlines, a Chicago newspaper for the gay community. Accompanied by future husband, journalist Bart Bull, she told Nordhielm she felt boxed in by listener expectations that she was either straight or gay; she said "I would like a much broader definition for myself." She explained her wish to be politically and sexually subversive by saying, "I resent like hell that I was maybe 18 years old before I even heard the 'L' word. I mean, that's understood, growing up sheltered in a Mormon environment. But it would have made all the difference for me had I grown up knowing that the reason I didn't fit in, was because they hadn't told me there were more categories to fit into." She said she did not condone the outing activities engaged in by members of ACT UP.

Since then, Shocked has been listed as bisexual in reference books, and does not self-identify as a lesbian. In a 2013 interview with CNN, Shocked stated "I am, for the last 10 years, so deeply in love with a man that the idea of living my life without him is impossible. I know how much I love him, and knowing that passion that I have for him, would I ever want to deny that to anyone else? Absolutely not."

=== Religion and views on homosexuality ===
While performing at the Wild Goose Festival in June 2011, a Christian event at which the inclusion of gay Christians was debated, Shocked responded to an audience member's question about homosexuality by saying "Who drafted me as a gay icon? You are looking at the world's greatest homophobe. Ask God what He thinks."

On March 17, 2013, Shocked made an impromptu speech against same-sex marriage during a concert at Yoshi's nightclub in San Francisco, which led some audience members to leave in protest and the club's management to end the show. All venues eventually cancelled scheduled performances of her "Roadworks Tour" in response to reports of Shocked's remarks. In a March 20, 2013, email to the news media, Shocked apologized, saying that her comments had been misinterpreted, and that she was not describing her own opinions about homosexuality, but rather those of some Christians. An audio recording of the performance was reported as contradicting Shocked's post-performance explanation.

On April 1, 2013, Shocked appeared on CNN's Piers Morgan Live to clarify her remarks. Morgan asked Shocked three times whether she was "homophobic". Eventually, Shocked stated "If you want to keep this simple for the audience, let me just give you a straight no, I'm not homophobic. But the truth, I don't think, lies in the simplicity. It's in the nuance, and that's been completely lost in this." She said that the meaning behind her prior comments was misinterpreted.

=== Political activity ===
A photograph of Shocked being detained during a protest that appears on the cover of her debut studio album Short Sharp Shocked (1988) was taken by Chris Hardy of the San Francisco Examiner at a protest in San Francisco during the 1984 Democratic National Convention. Years later, Shocked was arrested during the November 29, 2011 eviction of the Occupy Los Angeles movement.

== Awards ==
Shocked was honored with Folk Album of the Year at the CMJ New Music Awards ceremony in late October 1989, taped in New York City for later broadcast. The award recognized the popularity of Short Sharp Shocked with college radio listeners.

== Discography ==
=== Albums ===
List of albums, with selected details and chart positions
Title	Details	Peak chart positions			
Title	Details	US	AUS	NZ	UK
The Texas Campfire Tapes	Released: 1986; Label: Cooking Vinyl/Mercury	—	—	—	—
Short Sharp Shocked	Released: August 15, 1988; Label: Mercury	73	46	20	33
Captain Swing	Released: October 1989; Label: Mercury	95	58	38	31
Arkansas Traveler	Released: April 1992; Label: Mercury	—	33	42	46
Artists Make Lousy Slaves (with Fiachna O'Braonain)	Released: 1996; Label: Mood Swing	—	—	—	—
Kind Hearted Woman	Released: 1996; Label: Private Music	—	—	—	—
Good News (with The Anointed Earls)	Released: 1998; Label: Mood Swing	—	—	—	—
Dub Natural	Released: 2001; Label: Mood Swing	—	—	—	—
Deep Natural	Released: 2002; Label: Mighty Sound; Includes Dub Natural as a bonus disc	—	—	—	—
Don't Ask Don't Tell	Released: 2005; Label: Mighty Sound	—	—	—	—
Mexican Standoff	Released: 2005; Label: Mighty Sound	—	—	—	—
Got No Strings	Released: 2005; Label: Mighty Sound	—	—	—	—
ToHeavenURide	Released: 2007; Label: Mighty Sound; Recorded at the Telluride Bluegrass Festival on June 22, 2003	—	—	—	—
Soul of My Soul	Released: 2009; Label: Mighty Sound	—	—	—	—

=== Re-releases ===
Shocked has re-released her Mercury releases in expanded form on her own Mighty Sound imprint

- Texas Campfire Takes (April 22, 2003) – two-disc expanded reissue of The Texas Campfire Tapes
- Short Sharp Shocked (September 23, 2003) – two-disc set
- Captain Swing (March 16, 2004)
- Arkansas Traveler (September 14, 2004)

=== Compilations ===
- Mercury Poise: 1988–1995 (Mercury, 1996)
- Shockolates (Mighty Sound, 2004)
- Threesome (Mighty Sound, 2005) – compiles Don't Ask Don't Tell, Mexican Standoff, and Got No Strings

=== Other releases ===
- Live (Mercury, 1990) – promo only 12" EP with five tracks recorded live at the Oxford Apollo, London, on 12 December 1989
- Captain Swing Review (Polygram, 1990) – live concert film, VHS
- Michelle Shocked DVD (Mighty Sound, 2004) – compilation

"Mood Swing" and "Mighty Sound" are the label names Shocked has used for her independent self-owned releases.

=== Singles ===
List of singles, with selected chart positions
Title	Year	Chart positions					Album
Title	Year	US	US Mod	US MSR	AUS	UK	Album
"Anchorage"	1988	66	16	—	51	60	Short Sharp Shocked
"If Love Was a Train"	1988	—	20	33	—	63	Short Sharp Shocked
"When I Grow Up"	1988	—	—	—	108	67	Short Sharp Shocked
"On the Greener Side"	1989	—	19	—	118	—	Captain Swing
"Come a Long Way"	1992	—	—	—	100	77	Arkansas Traveler
