= Short Sharp Shock (band) =

English crossover thrash band

- Also known as: SSS
- Origin: Liverpool, England
- Genres: Crossover thrash; hardcore punk; thrash metal
- Years active: 2005–present
- Label: Prosthetic
- Members: Foxy
- Past members: Mark Magill; Dave Fergusson; Peter Broom
- Website: MySpace – SSS

Short Sharp Shock (also known as SSS) are an English band from Liverpool, England.

The band featured members of Liverpool punk and hardcore bands Down and Outs and Walk the Plank, and released a six-track demo in May 2005, a four-track EP the next year, and their debut album, Short Sharp Shock, soon after. Their label at the time was Thrashgig / Dead & Gone Records. They switched to Earache Records and reissued the album in early 2007 with bonus tracks.

In 2008, they released their second album, The Dividing Line, on Earache Records. It included a free Sk8+Destroy 7" record, featuring British comedian Frank Sidebottom.

In June 2011, they released their third album, Problems to the Answer, on Earache Records. It featured 25 tracks and Mark Greenway from Napalm Death on guest vocals. Founding members David Fergusson and guitarist Peter Broom left the band at that point. In July 2011, Stu and El Longo joined the lineup.

In November 2013, the band signed with Prosthetic Records and released the Manipulated Living EP. SSS's fourth album, LIMP.GASP.COLLAPSE., was released in November 2014 on Prosthetic Records, and featured Jeff Walker from Carcass on guest vocals.

== Members ==
- Foxy – Vocals
- Stu – Guitar
- El Longo – Drums
- Mr Bass Man – Bass

== Discography ==
- Short Sharp Shock (2007)
- The Dividing Line (2008)
- This and Not That (2010)
- Problems to the Answer (2011)
- Limp. Gasp. Collapse. (2014)

=== Contributed tracks to ===
- Thrashing Like a Maniac (Compilation, 2007)
