= Sandford C. Faulkner =

American planter, raconteur and fiddler (1803–1874)

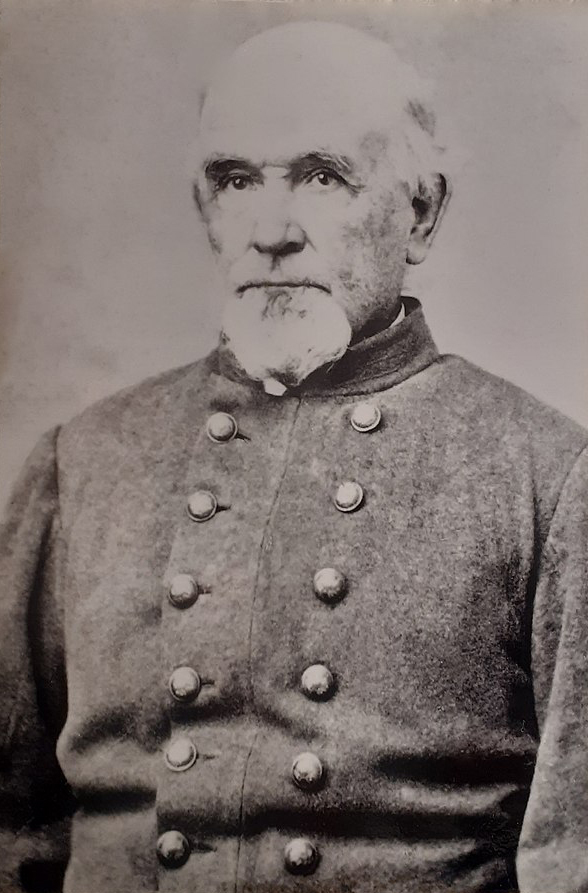
- Faulkner in uniform, c. 1862
- Born: March 3, 1803; Georgetown, Kentucky, U.S.
- Died: August 4, 1874 (aged 71); Little Rock, Arkansas, U.S.
- Resting place: Mount Holly Cemetery, Little Rock, Arkansas, U.S. 34°44′16.7″N 92°16′44.2″W
- Occupations: planter; raconteur; fiddler
- Notable work: "Arkansas Traveler"
- Political party: Democratic
- Board member of: Real Estate Bank of Arkansas
- Spouse: Evelene M. Peak (died 1871)
- Children: 4
- Parents: Nicholas Faulkner; Sally Fletcher
- Military service
- Allegiance: Confederate States
- Branch: Army
- Service years: 1861–1865
- Rank: Captain
- Commands: Little Rock Arsenal (1862–63); Marshall Ordnance Depot (1863–65)
- Wars: American Civil War; Trans-Mississippi Theater

Sandford C. Faulkner (March 3, 1803 – August 4, 1874), better known as Sandy Faulkner, was an American planter, raconteur and fiddler who personified the mid-19th century folk song "Arkansas Traveler," for which he received writing credit. It has since gone on to become the official state historic song of Arkansas.

== Biography ==
Sandford C. Faulkner was born in Georgetown, Kentucky, on March 3, 1803 to Nicholas and Sally (née Fletcher) Faulkner. He was responsible in large part for the story forming the basis of the "Arkansas Traveler," which was the official song of Arkansas from 1949 to 1963, and the official state historic song of Arkansas since 1987. During the American Civil War, Faulkner served as an artillery officer detailed to ordnance duty in the Trans-Mississippi Department of the Confederate States Army.

From November 1862 to August 1863, Faulkner served as the commanding officer of the Little Rock Arsenal. In late September 1863, The Little Rock facility relocated to Tyler, Texas, and was redesignated Tyler Ordnance Works. On October 1 of the same year, the Little Rock ordnance stores were turned over to Lieutenant-Colonel G. H. Hill, officer in charge at Tyler. Faulkner was then assigned as commanding officer of the ordnance depot at Marshall, Texas, and served there to the end of the war.

== Honors ==
Faulkner County, Arkansas (established 1873) is named after him.
