= The Arkansas Traveler (song) =

1863 folk song by Mose Case

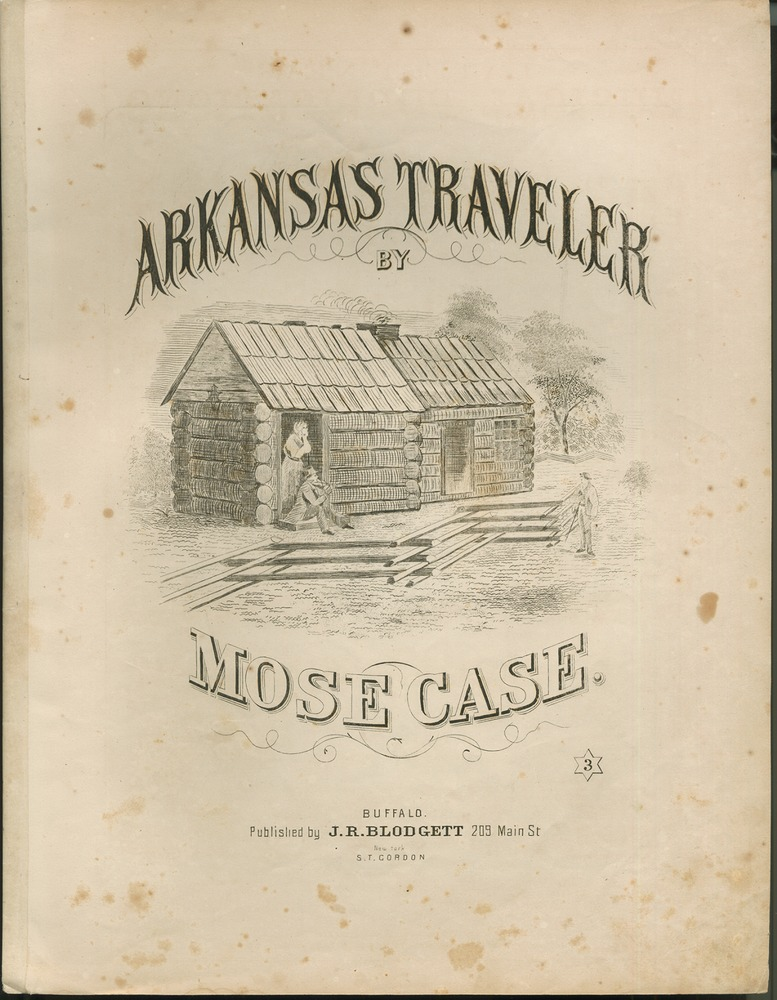

Song by Mose Case
- Published: 1863
- Genre: American folk
- Songwriter: Traditional
- Composer: Sandford C. Faulkner

Audio sample
- 1922 recording by Eck Robertson: file; help

"The Arkansas Traveler" (also known as "The Arkansaw Traveler") is an American folk song first published by Mose Case, a humorist and guitarist from New York, in 1863. The song was based on the composition "The Arkansas Traveller" by Sandford C. Faulkner and is the Arkansas official historic song.

== Origin ==
The origin of the "Arkansas Traveler" relates to the time Sandford C. Faulkner, a wealthy planter of Chicot County, Arkansas, got lost among the wild, rugged hills of the old Bayou Mason township in that county. In his travels, he happens upon the dilapidated cabin of a squatter, when the now famous colloquy between the traveler and the squatter took place regarding the leaky condition of the cabin, which could not be repaired when it rained and which did not need repairing when the weather was good. So between the conditions of good weather and bad weather the miserable hovel continued open to rain and sun alike.

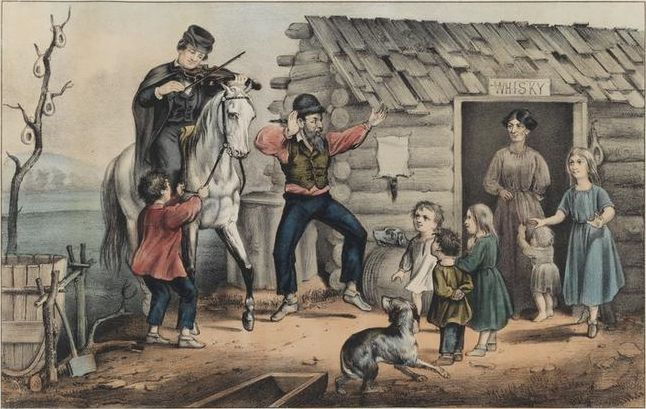
The Turn of the Tune. Traveller Playing the "Arkansas Traveller," lithograph by Currier and Ives, 1870

The squatter, who was non-committal to all inquiries of the traveler as to the locality, the road, or the way out of the hills, and who was very peremptory in his refusal of accommodation for the traveler and his horse, was engaged in a bungling attempt to play upon an old cracked and battered fiddle the first bar or two of an old familiar air much in vogue with the settlers of some of the older Southern States. Faulkner, who was somewhat of a fiddler himself, took the squeaky instrument and played the whole of the tune and played himself into the heart and home of the surly old squatter, who joyously accorded him the only dry spot in the cabin, feed for his horse, and a pull at the old black whisky jug.

The score was first published by W. C. Peters in 1847 who arranged Faulkner's tune under the name "The Arkansas Traveller and Rackinsac Waltz."

== History ==
The song was first published by Mose Case, a humorist and guitarist from New York, in 1863 under the name "The Arkansas Traveler." A recitation of the story by Len Spencer, with accompaniment by an unknown fiddler, was first recorded by the Zonophone label in early 1902. In December 1908, Spencer recorded "The Arkansaw Traveler" for Victor Records. In April 1916, it was recorded by Kentucky fiddler Don Richardson for Columbia. The 1922 version by native-Arkansan “Eck” Robertson was among the first fifty recordings named to the National Recording Registry of the Library of Congress.

The official state song of Arkansas from 1949 to 1963, it has been the state historic song since 1987. The official lyrics were written by a committee in 1947 in preparation for its naming as the official state song. It is traditionally known to have had several versions of lyrics, which are much older than Arkansas' copyrighted song. Arkansas' other state songs are "Arkansas" (state anthem), "Arkansas (You Run Deep In Me)," and "Oh, Arkansas."

== Lyrical variations ==
The song has many versions, recorded by many people, and it has also inspired the creation of the children's song, "baby bumblebee" which shares the same tune.

=== State historic song ===
Composed by the Arkansas State Song Selection Committee in 1947.

Far and far away down in Arkansas,
There lived a squatter with a stubborn jaw.
His nose was ruby red and his whiskers gray.
And he would sit and fiddle all the night and all the day.
Came a traveler down the valley, asked if he could find a bed.
Yes, try the road, the kindly squatter said.
Then, could you point me out the way to find a tavern or an Inn?
Quite a little piece I reckon, tho I've never been!

And, when the rain came down on the cabin floor,
The squatter only fiddled all the more.
Why don't you mend your roof, said the traveler bold.
How can I mend my cabin when the rain is wet and cold?
Squatter pick a sunny morning when the air is dry and nice,
Patch up your cabin, that is my advice.
The squatter shook his hoary head, and answered with a stubborn air,
Cabin never leaks a drop when days are bright and fair!

=== Peter Pan version ===
Verse 1
Oh, once upon a time in Arkansas,
An old man sat in his little cabin door
And fiddled at a tune that he lik’d to hear,
A jolly old tune that he played by ear.
It was raining hard, but the fiddler didn't care,
He sawed away at the popular air,
Tho' his rooftree leaked like a waterfall,
That didn't seem to bother the man at all.
Verse 2
A traveler was riding by that day,
And stopped to hear him a-practicing away;
The cabin was a-float and his feet were wet,
But still the old man didn't seem to fret.
So the stranger said "Now the way it seems to me,
You'd better mend your roof," said he.
But the old man said as he played away,
"I couldn't mend it now, it's a rainy day."
Verse 3
The traveler replied, "That's all quite true,
But this, I think, is the thing for you to do;
Get busy on a day that is fair and bright,
Then patch the old roof till it's good and tight."
But the old man kept on a-playing at his reel,
And tapped the ground with his leathery heel.
"Get along," said he, "for you give me a pain;
My cabin never leaks when it doesn't rain."

=== Albert Bigelow Paine's 1st version ===
from The Arkansaw Bear: A Tale of Fanciful Adventure. The second version is the original version. The first version is the version taught to Northern school Children.

Oh, 'twas down in the woods of the Arkansaw,
And the night was cloudy and the wind was raw,
And he didn't have a bed, and he didn't have a bite,
And if he hadn't fiddled, he'd a travelled all night.

But he came to a cabin, and an old gray man,
And says he, "Where am I going? Now tell me if you can."

"Oh, we'll have a little music first and then some supper, too,
But before we have the supper we will play the music through.
You'll forget about your supper, you'll forget about your home,
You'll forget you ever started out in Arkansaw to roam."

Now the old man sat a-fiddling by the little cabin door,
And the tune was pretty lively, and he played it o'er and o'er,
And the stranger sat a-list'ning and a-wond'ring what to do,
As he fiddled and he fiddled, but he never played it through.

Then the stranger asked the fiddler, "Won't you play the rest for me?"
"Don't know it," says the fiddler. "Play it for yourself!" says he.

Then the stranger took the fiddle, with a riddy-diddle-diddle,
And the strings began to tingle at the jingle of the bow,
While the old man sat and listened, and his eyes with pleasure glistened,
As he shouted, "Hallelujah! And hurray for Joe!"

=== Albert Bigelow Paine's 2nd version ===
Oh, there was a little boy and his name was Bo,
Went out into the woods when the moon was low,
And he met an old bear who was hungry for a snack,
And his folks are still a-waiting for Bosephus to come back.

For the boy became the teacher of this kind and gentle creature
Who can play upon the fiddle in a very skillful way.
And they'll never, ever sever, and they'll travel on forever,
Bosephus and the fiddle and the old black bear.

=== Baby Bumblebee (alternate song to the same tune) ===
I'm bringin' home a baby bumblebee
Won't my mommy be so proud of me
I'm bringin' home a baby bumblebee—
Ouch! It stung me!

I'm squishin' up my baby bumblebee
Won't my mommy be so proud of me
I'm squishin' up my baby bumblebee-
Yuck! It's dirty!

I'm lickin' up my baby bumble bee
Won't my mommy be so proud of me
I'm lickin' up my baby bumble bee-
Ick! I feel sick!

I'm barfin' up my baby bumble bee
Won't my mommy be so proud of me
I'm barfin' up my baby bumble bee-
Oh! What a mess!

I'm wipin' up my baby bumble bee
Won't my mommy be so proud of me
I'm wipin' up my baby bumble bee-
Oops! Mommy's new towel!

I'm wringin' out my baby bumble bee
Won't my mommy be so proud of me
I'm wringin' out my baby bumble bee-
Bye-bye baby bumblebee!

=== Alternate lyrics to "Baby Bumblebee" ===
I'm bringin' home a baby bumblebee
Won't my mommy be so proud of me
I'm bringin' home a baby bumblebee—
Ouch! He stung me!

I'm bringin' home my baby dinosaur
Won't my mommy kick him out the door?
I'm bringin' home my baby dinosaur-
Oof! He stepped on me!

I'm bringin' home my baby hippopotamus
Won't my mommy fuss, and fuss, and fuss? I'm bringin' home my baby hippopotamus-
Oh no! He swallowed me!

== See also ==
- List of U.S. state songs
