= List of Norfolk and Western Railway locomotives =

This is a list of locomotives that have worked for the Norfolk and Western Railway.

== Steam locomotives ==
Image	N&W class	Wheel arrangement	Fleet number(s)	Manufacturer Serial numbers	Year made	Quantity made	Quantity preserved	Year(s) withdrawn	Comments
	Tender locomotives								
	A (2nd)	4-6-0	86–90	Baldwin	1902, 1904	5	0	1928	
	A (3rd)	2-6-6-4	1200–1243	Roanoke Shops	1936–1950	44	1	1958–1961	1218 preserved, sole remaining 2-6-6-4 in existence, A 1204 scrapped in 1942 after suffering a boiler explosion
	B (2nd)	2-8-0	61–70	Baldwin	1898, 1904	10	0	1933–1934	Cross-compound, simpled 1909–1912, 61 displayed 1904 St Louis World's Fair
	C	4-6-0	42-55	Baldwin	1881-1883	14	0		43-50 renumbered 539-548, 42 to Virginia Carolina Ry 1, returned to N&W 1
	D	4-6-0	38-41, 206-210, 401-404	Rogers	1889-1891	17	0		206-210, 401-404 renumbered 42-50 2nd
	E (1st)	4-6-0	531-548	Baldwin	1880-1881	18	0		ex Shenandoah Valley RR 20-29, 34-41
	E (2nd)	4-6-2	595–599	Alco-Richmond	1905	5	0	1934-1939	
	E1	4-6-2	580–594	Baldwin	1907	15	0	1934–1939	
	E2	4-6-2	564–579	Alco-Richmond	1910	16	1	1942-1958	All rebuilt into E2a, 578 preserved
	E2a	4-6-2	553–563	Baldwin (6), Roanoke Shops (5)	1912	11	0	1934–1957	
	E2b	4-6-2	543–552	Roanoke Shops	1913–1914	10	0	1934–1939	
	E3	4-6-2	500–504	Baldwin	1913	5	0	1944–1949	ex PRR K3a
	F	2-8-0	1-26, 146-187	Roanoke Machine Works	1886-1888	58	0		
	F	2-8-0	2-3 (2nd)	Baldwin	1906, 1908	2	0		ex Virginia Carolina Ry 2-3
	G	2-8-0	188-200, 211-314, 346-351, 558-564	Roanoke Machine Works, Baldwin, Rogers	1888-1896	140	1		558-564 ex Shenandoah Valley Railroad 51-57, 200 renumbered 210 (2nd), 219, 229, 235, 199 renumbered 303-306 (2nd), 350-351 renumbered 207-208 (2nd) N&W #305 purchased by Matheson Alkali Works in 1921. Renumbered #11 On display in Saltville, VA. Oldest surviving N&W locomotive in existence.
	G1	2-8-0	352-358	Baldwin	1897	7	2	1912–1955	renumbered 200-206, 203, 205, 200-201 to Virginia Carolina Ry 4-7, returned to N&W 4-7, 6 and 7 preserved, 204, 206 renumbered 301-302 (2nd)
	H	4-6-0	56-61, 98-106	Grant	1883	15	0		
	I	2-8-0	107-125, 549-557	Baldwin, Roanoke Shops	1883-1885	28	0		549-557 ex Shenandoah Valley RR 42-50, all rebuilt to 0-8-0
	J (1st)	4-4-0	510-513	Baldwin	1879-1880	4	0	1900	ex Shenandoah Valley RR 2-5
	J (2nd)	4-4-2	600–606	Baldwin	1903–1904	7	0	1931–1935	
	J (3rd)	4-8-4	600–613	Roanoke Shops	1941–1950	14	1	1958–1959	605–610 built unstreamlined as J1; 611 preserved
	K	4-4-0	27-28, 32, 34, 36	Baldwin	1878-1881	5	0		ex Atlantic Mississippi & Ohio RR 27-28, 32, 34, 36, renumbered 523-527
	K1	4-8-2	100–115	Roanoke Shops	1916–1917	16	0	1957–1958	
	K2	4-8-2	116–125	Alco-Brooks	1919	10	0	1957–1959	USRA Heavy Mountain
	K2a	4-8-2	126–137	Baldwin	1923	12	0	1958–1959	
	K3	4-8-2	200–209	Roanoke Shops	1926	10	0	1944–1945	Sold to RF&P and D&RGW
	L	4-6-0	126-128	Roanoke Machine Works	1885	3	0		renumbered 135-137
	M (1st)	4-4-0	94-95	Baldwin	1883	2	0		redesignated class O-19
	M (2nd)	4-8-0	375–499	Alco-Richmond (75), Baldwin (50)	1906–1907	125	2	1926–1958	433 and 475 preserved
	M1	4-8-0	1000–1099	Alco-Richmond (50), Baldwin (50)	1907	100	0	1926–1947	
	M2	4-8-0	1100–1149	Baldwin	1910	50	2	1950–1957	1118 and 1134 preserved
	M2a	4-8-0	1150–1152	Roanoke Shops	1911	3	0	1950–1956	1151 preserved
	M2b	4-8-0	1153–1154	Roanoke Shops	1911	2	0	1950–1956	
	M2c	4-8-0	1155–1160	Roanoke Shops	1911–1912	6	1	1952–1957	
	N	4-4-0	29-31, 33, 35, 37, 201-205	Baldwin, Rogers	1887-1888	11	0		201-205 renumbered 28, 31 (2nd), 32, 34, 36, 29, 30, 33, 35, 36 rebuilt to N-1)
	O-1	4-4-0	69	Mason/AM&O Shops	1873	1	0		ex Atlantic Mississippi & Ohio 69
	O-2	4-4-0	501-504	Rogers	1873	4	0		ex Scioto Valley 5-8
	O-3	4-4-0	505-506	Brooks	1873	2	0		ex Scioto Valley 9-10
	O-4	4-4-0	507-508	Portland	1880	2	0		ex Scioto Valley 11-12, 508 to B&CC RR, returned to N&W as 503 (2nd)
	O-5	4-4-0	509	Rhode Island	1878	1	0		ex Shenandoah Valley 1
	O-6	4-4-0	519-520	Pittsburgh	1877	2	0		ex Scioto Valley 1-2
	O-7	4-4-0	521-522	Pittsburgh	1878	2	0		ex Scioto Valley 3-4
	O-8	2-6-0	523	Baldwin	1872	1	0		ex Scito Valley 13
	O-9	4-4-0	524-527	Schenectady	1882	4	0		ex Scioto Valley 14-17
	O-10	2-6-0	528-529	Baldwin	1887	2	0		ex Scioto Valley 20-21
	O-11	2-6-0	530	Baldwin	1888	1	0		ex Scioto Valley 22
	O-12	4-4-0	701	Baldwin	1872	1	0		ex Roanoke Southern 1
	O-13	4-4-0	702	Baldwin	1889	1	0		ex Roanoke Southern 2, renumbered 501 (2nd)
	O-14	4-4-0	703,706	Pittsburgh	1890-1891	2	0		ex Roanoke Southern 3, 6, renumbered 502, 508 (2nd)
	O-15	4-6-0	704-705	Pittsburgh	1881	2	0		ex Roanoke Southern 4-5, renumbered 505-506 (2nd)
	O-16	4-4-0	707-709	Baldwin	1889	3	0		ex Lynchburg & Durham 2-4, 707, 709 renumbered 509-510 (2nd)
	O-17	4-6-0	710-711	Baldwin	1889	2	0		ex Lynchburg & Durham 5-6, renumbered 511-512 (2nd)
	O-19	4-4-0	94-95	Baldwin	1883	2	0		formerly class M (1st), renumbered 519-520 (2nd)
	O-20	4-4-0	713-715	Baldwin, Hinkley	1887-1888	3	0		ex Cincinnati, Portsmouth & Virginia 1-3, renumbered 513, 519, 520 (2nd)
	O-21	2-6-0	716-717	New York	1888	2	0		ex Cincinnati Portsmouth & Virginia 10-11, renumbered 521-522 (2nd)
	O-22	2-6-0	718-719	New York	1888	2	0		ex Cincinnati Portsmouth & Virginia 12-13, renumbered 531-532 (2nd)
	O-23	4-6-0	720	Altoona Shops	1871	1	0		ex Cincinnati Portsmouth & Virginia 14, renumbered 534 (2nd)
	O-24	4-6-0	721-722	Baldwin	1890	2	0		ex Cincinnati Portsmouth & Virginia 15-16, renumbered 535-536 (2nd)
	O-25	4-6-0	500, 543-544	Baldwin	1881	2	0		543-544 formerly class E (1st), 500 ex Big Sandy East Lynn & Guyon RR 7, formerly N&W 545
	O-26	4-6-0	723-724	Logansport Shops	1890	2	0		ex Cincinnati Portsmouth & Virginia 17-18, renumbered 537, 539 (2nd)
	O-28	2-6-2	91	Richmond	1904	1	0		ex Virginia Anthracite Coal & Ry 2
	O-29	4-6-0	548	Baldwin	1882	1	0		ex 50, renumbered 54 (2nd)
	P	0-6-0	132-137, 141-145	Baldwin	1887, 1890	11	0		
	Q	4-4-0	514-518	Baldwin	1881-1882	5	0		ex Shenandoah Valley 6-10
	R	0-6-0	129-131, 395-400	Roanoke Machine Works	1885, 1893	9	0		395-400 renumbered 92-97 (2nd)
	S	0-6-0	138-140	Rogers	1888	3	0		
	S1	0-8-0	255–284	Baldwin	1948	30	0	1958–1960	ex-C&O C-16 class 255–284, acquired c.1950
	S1a	0-8-0	200–244	Roanoke Shops	1951–1953	45	0	1958–1960	#244 last steam locomotive built in the U.S. for domestic use (not counting a steam turbine electric locomotive constructed in 1954, see below)
	T	2-8-0	315–345	Baldwin	1893-94	31	0		341-345 reclassified Ta, then T2, then T3, 316, 324, 331, 333, 338 reclassified T1
	U	4-6-0	71-85	Baldwin	1892	15	0		
	V	4-6-0	950–961	Baldwin	1900	12	0	1929–1948	
	V1	4-6-0	962–966	Alco-Richmond	1902	5	0	1929–1933	
	W	2-8-0	800–829	Baldwin	1898–1899	30	0	1926–1934	800-822, 824-829 reclassified W1, 823 reclassified W3, 800, 802, 804, 806, 809, 821, 825 rebuilt to 0-8-0T, reclassified W5
	W1	2-8-0	830–842, 844–865, 870-879	Roanoke Shops, Baldwin, Alco-Richmond	1900–1901	44	0	1926–1934	830, 834, 839, 842, 860 rebuilt to 0-8-0T, reclassified W5
	W2	2-8-0	673–799, 843, 866–869, 880-949	Roanoke Shops, Baldwin, Richmond, Cooke	1901–1905	202	1	1926–1953	776 reclassified W4 917 preserved
	X1	0-8-8-0	990–994	Alco-Schenectady	1910	5	0	1934	
	Y1	2-8-8-2	995–999	Baldwin	1910	5	0	1924	
	Y2	2-8-8-2	1700–1704	Roanoke Shops	1918–1921	5	0	1946–1951	rebuilt to Y2a
	Y2	2-8-8-2	1711–1730	Baldwin	1919	20	0	1948–1951	rebuilt to Y2a
	Y2a	2-8-8-2	1705–1710	Roanoke Shops	1924	6	0	1948–1949	
	Y3	2-8-8-2	2000–2044	Alco-Schenectady	1919	45	0	1957–1958	
	Y3	2-8-8-2	2045–2049	Baldwin	1919	5	0	1957–1958	
	Y3a	2-8-8-2	2050–2079	Alco-Richmond	1923	30	1	1958–1959	2050 preserved
	Y3b/Y4	2-8-8-2	2080–2089	Alco-Richmond	1927	10	0	1958	re-classed Y4 in 1927
	Y4a/Y5	2-8-8-2	2090–2099 (rebuilt as 2110-2119) 2100-2109	Roanoke Shops	1930–1932	20	0	1958–1960	re-classed Y5. Engines 2090-2099 were rebuilt and renumbered 2110-2119 in years 1940-1941, except 2092 wrecked
	Y6	2-8-8-2	2120–2154	Roanoke Shops	1936–1940	35	0	1958–1961	
	Y6a	2-8-8-2	2155–2170	Roanoke Shops	1942	16	1	1958–1961	2156 preserved
	Y6b	2-8-8-2	2171–2200	Roanoke Shops	1948–1952	30	0	1958–1961	2174 was one of the last steam locomotives to be withdrawn in the USA.
	Y7	2-8-8-2	-	-	Never built	0	-	Never built	Never built
	Z1	2-6-6-2	1300–1314	Alco-Richmond	1912	10	0	1934	
	Z1a	2-6-6-2	1315–1489	Alco-Richmond, Baldwin	1912–1918	175	0	1934–1958	1331–1489 rebuilt to Z1b, 1399 rebuilt to Z2
	Steam turbine-electric locomotive								
	TE1	C+C-C+C	2300	Baldwin & Westinghouse	1954	1	0	1958	Nicknamed "Jawn Henry"
	Tank locomotives								
	A (1st)	0-6-2T	92-93	Baldwin	1883	2	0		
	B (1st)	0-4-4T	96-97	Mason	1883	2	0		96 redesignated class O-18
	G2	0-8-0T	256	Roanoke Shops	1890	1	0		rebuilt from class G 2-8-0 256
	O-18	0-4-4T	96	Mason	1883	1	0		formerly class B (1st)
	W5	0-8-0T	800, 802, 804, 806, 809, 821, 825, 830, 834, 839, 842, 860	Roanoke Shops (rebuilder)	1945	12	0	1959	reclassified W6, 800, 809, 821, 830 renumbered 10-13
	Early locomotives retired before classes assigned								
	none	4-4-0	1-3, 6-11, 13-18, 20	Hinkley, Mason, Norris	1867-1870	16	0		ex Atlantic Mississippi & Ohio (Eastern Division) same numbers, 2, 8, 14-18, 20 renumbered 4-5, 52, 26, 29, 30, 38, 39
	none	4-4-0	2, 8, 12, 14-24	Mason, Norris, Baldwin	1864-1870	14	0		ex Atlantic Mississippi & Ohio (Western Division) same numbers
	none	4-4-0	31, 33, 35, 37, 40, 41	Rome	1858-1859	6	0		ex Atlantic Mississippi & Ohio (Western Division) same numbers
	none	4-4-0	25, 27-28, 32, 34, 36	Baldwin	1878-1881	6	0		ex Atlantic Mississippi & Ohio same numbers
	none	4-4-0	62-91	Mason	1871-1873	30	0		ex Atlantic Mississippi & Ohio same numbers, 79, 81 renumbered 69, 70 (2nd), 69 to class O-1

== Electric locomotives ==
Image	N&W class	Wheel arrangement	Fleet number(s)	Manufacturer Serial numbers	Year made	Quantity made	Quantity preserved	Year(s) withdrawn	Comments
	Norfolk & Western Railway locomotives								
	LC-1	(1-B+B-1)+(1-B+B-1)	E1 to E24 renumbered 2500A&B to 2511A&B (not in order)	Baldwin & Westinghouse	1914–1915	12	0	1950	3,211 hp (2.39 MW)
	LC-2	(1-D-1)+(1-D-1)	2512 to 2515	Alco & Westinghouse	1924	4	0	1950	4,750 hp (3.54 MW)
	Former Virginian Railway locomotives (acquired 1959)								
	EL-3A	1-D-1	100ABC to 111ABC	Alco & Westinghouse	1925–1926	36	0	1962	2,000 hp (1.49 MW)
	EL-2B	(B+B-B+B)+(B+B-B+B)	125A&B to 128A&B renumbered 221 to 228 (not in order) by N&W	General Electric	1948	4	0	1962	6,800 hp (5,100 kW)
	EL-C	C-C	130 to 141 renumbered N&W 230 to 241	General Electric	1956–1957	12	1	1962	3,300 hp (2,500 kW)

== Diesel locomotives ==
=== Diesel locomotives acquired prior to 1964 mergers (all retired during mid 70s to mid 80s) ===
Model	Wheel arrangement	Fleet number(s)	Year made	Quantity acquired	Comments
ALCO RS-3	B-B	92–99	1955–1956	8	Renumbered 300–307 in 1956
ALCO RS-11	B-B	308–406	1956–1961	99	
ALCO RS-36	B-B	407–412	1962	6	
ALCO T-6	B-B	10–49	1959	40	40–41 sold to Chesapeake Western Railway 10–11
EMD GP9	B-B	500–521	1957–1958	22	Passenger units, painted maroon
EMD GP9	B-B	620–699	1958–1959	80	N&W 620 remains in operation at the N.C. Transportation Museum. Originally in the black freight color scheme, she was repainted to tuscan in 1986 to reflect her role in pulling the museum's passenger train.
EMD GP9	B-B	10–13	1955	4	Renumbered 710–713 in 1956
EMD GP9	B-B	714–761	1956–1957	48	
EMD GP9	B-B	762–767 (1st)	1957	6	Passenger units, renumbered 500–505
EMD GP9	B-B	766–767 (2nd)	1957	2	ex-Winston-Salem Southbound Railway 1500–1501
EMD GP9	B-B	768–914	1957–1959	147	
EMD GP18	B-B	915–962	1959–1961	48	
EMD GP30	B-B	522–565	1962	44	
EMD GP35	B-B	200–239	1963–1964	40	
EMD GP35	B-B	1300–1328	1964–1965	29	1300-1301 (low short hood) ordered by P&WV, 1302-1308 (low short hood, no dynamic brakes) ordered by Wabash

=== Diesel locomotives acquired through 1964 mergers ===
ex Virginian Railway locomotives in 1959
ex-Wabash Railway locomotives
ex Nickel Plate Road locomotives
ex Akron, Canton and Youngstown Railroad locomotives
ex Pittsburgh and West Virginia Railway locomotives
