= Norfolk and Western classes Y6, Y6a and Y6b =

American steam locomotive class

Norfolk and Western classes Y6 and Y6a
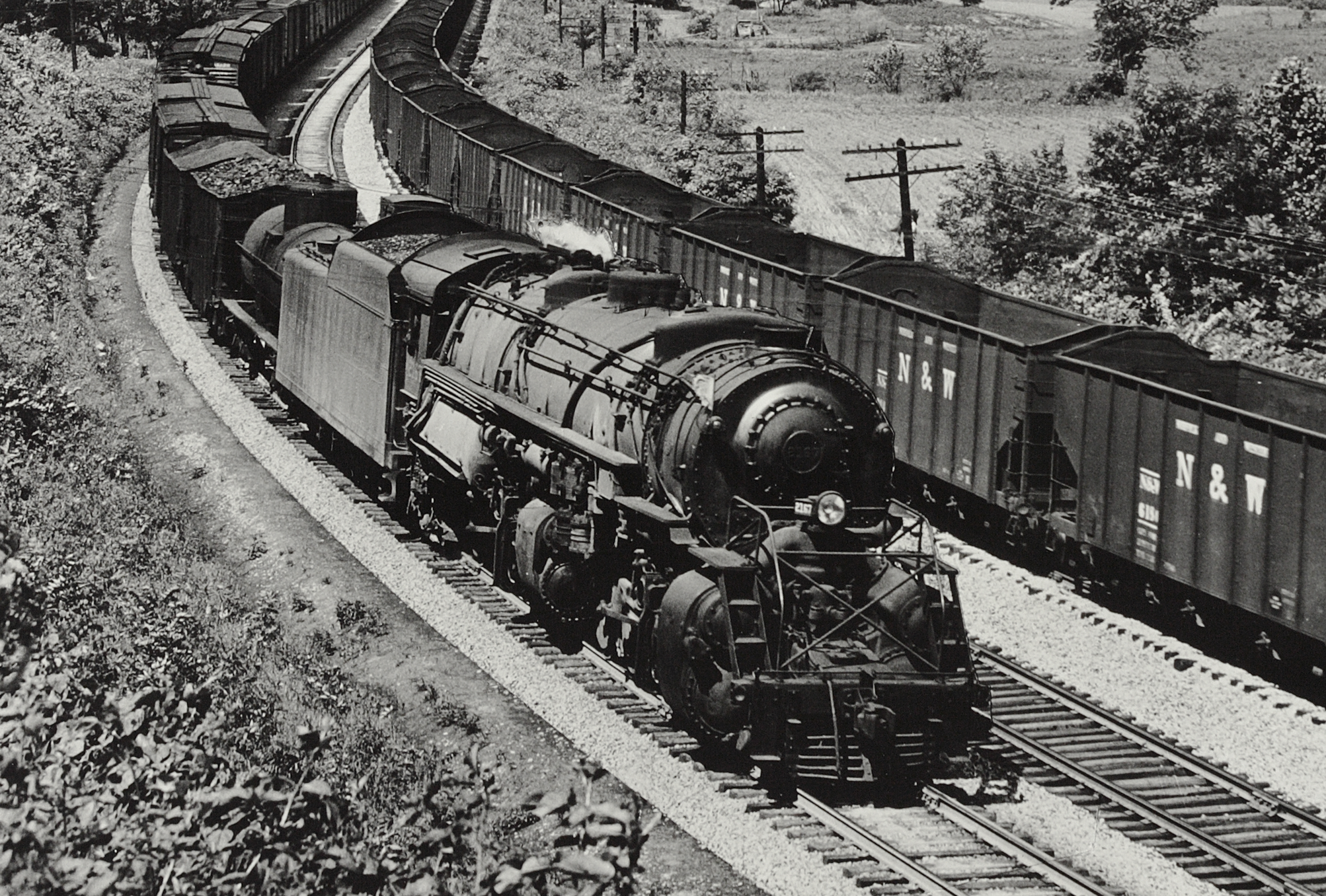
- Norfolk & Western Y6a No. 2167 pulling a mixed freight train.
Type and origin
- Power type: Steam
- Builder: Roanoke Shops (East End Shops)
- Build date: 1936-1942
- Total produced: 51
Specifications
- Configuration
  - Whyte: 2-8-8-2
  - UIC: (1′D)D1′ h4v
- Gauge: 4 ft 8 1/2 in (1,435 mm)
- Leading dia.: 30 in (762 mm)
- Driver dia.: 58 in (1,473 mm) (as built 57 in (1,448 mm))
- Trailing dia.: 30 in (762 mm)
- Tender wheels: 33 in (838 mm)
- Wheelbase: 103 ft 8 1/4 in (31.60 m)
  - Engine: 58 ft 0 in (17.68 m)
- Length
  - Over couplers: 114 ft 10 1/2 in (35.01 m)
- Height: 15 ft 8 7/16 in (4.79 m)
- Adhesive weight: 522,850 lb (237.2 tonnes)
- Loco weight: 582,900 lb (264.4 tonnes)
- Tender weight: 143,200 lb (65.0 tonnes)) (empty); 378,600 lb (171.7 tonnes)) (loaded)
- Total weight: 961,500 lb (436.1 tonnes))
- Fuel type: Coal
- Fuel capacity: 30 t (29.5 long tons; 33.1 short tons)
- Water cap.: 22,000 US gal (83,000 L; 18,000 imp gal)
- Firebox
  - Grate area: 106.2 sq ft (9.87 m^{2})
- Boiler
  - Model: 104 in (2,642 mm)
  - Small tubes: 2 1/4 in (57 mm)
  - Large tubes: 5 1/2 in (140 mm)
- Boiler pressure: 300 psi (2.07 MPa)
- Safety valve: 4 Ashton 3 1/2 in (89 mm)
- Heating surface
  - Firebox: 371 sq ft (34.5 m^{2})
  - Arch tubes: 59 sq ft (5.5 m^{2})
  - Flues: 5,226 sq ft (485.5 m^{2})
  - Total surface: 7,431 sq ft (690.4 m^{2})
- Superheater
  - Type: Type A
  - Heating area: 1,775 sq ft (164.9 m^{2})
- Cylinders: Four: two low-pressure (front), two high-pressure (rear)
- High-pressure cylinder: 25 in × 32 in (635 mm × 813 mm)
- Low-pressure cylinder: 39 in × 32 in (991 mm × 813 mm)
- Valve gear: Baker
Performance figures
- Maximum speed: 50 mph (80 km/h)
- Power output: 5,600 hp (4,200 kW) (as built 4,400 hp (3,300 kW))
- Tractive effort: (Simple: 166,000 lbf (738.4 kN)) (Compound: 126,838 lbf (564.2 kN)) (as built 152,206 lbf (677.0 kN))
- Factor of adh.: 3.30
Career
- Operators: Norfolk and Western Railway
- Class: Y6; Y6a
- Numbers: Y6: 2120-2154; Y6a: 2155-2170
- Disposition: One Y6a (No. 2156) preserved, remainder scrapped

The Norfolk and Western classes Y6, Y6a and Y6b were types of 2-8-8-2 Mallet steam locomotives. A total of 81 were built by the Norfolk and Western Railway (N&W) between 1936 and 1952.

== Classes Y6 and Y6a ==
=== Development, construction and design ===
In the 1930s, the N&W's mechanical engineering team explored ways to refine the Y series 2-8-8-2 compound Mallets, since demand for coal was increasing despite the effects of the Great Depression. In 1930 and 1931, the N&W built Y5 class 2-8-8-2's (Nos. 2090–2109) at the East End Shops in Roanoke, Virginia. The Y5s were evolutions of the railroad's Y4 class locomotives, which were copies of the United States Railroad Administration's (USRA) 2-8-8-2 design, but the Y5s were improved to the point they were considered exclusive N&W designs.

The N&W further improved the Y5 design, and from September 1936 to November 1940, they turned out 35 locomotives of the Y6 class (Nos. 2120–2154). The Y6s had the same specifications as the Y5s, but with design changes to improve efficiency: they were built with cast steel frames connected by a pin hinge; outside frame bearings on their pilot and trailing trucks; roller bearings for all the wheel journals; and automatic lubricators. The Y5s would later be rebuilt with most of these modifications. (Note: Y5s Nos. 2090-2099 were renumbered to 2110-2119, after being rebuilt.)

The Y6s were given 57-inch (1,400 mm) diameter driving wheels—later increased to 58 inches (1,500 mm) by thickening the tires—and an operating boiler pressure of 300 psi (2.1 MPa). They could produce a tractive effort of 152,200 lbf (677.02 kN) with simple expansion and 126,838 lbf (564.20 kN) with compound expansion, and when traveling at 25 miles per hour (40 km/h), they were rated at 5,500 horsepower (4,100 kW). Their water bottom tenders could hold 26 short tons (52,000 lb) of coal and 22,000 US gallons (83,000 L) of water.

Since they were equipped with roller bearings and automatic lubricators, the amount of time and expense required to maintain a Y6 was akin to diesel locomotives. In 1942, the N&W decided to build 16 more Mallets (Nos. 2155–2170), since the Y6s proved reliable and military traffic from World War II was rapidly increasing. The new Mallets were classified as Y6as, since they had some different features from their predecessors: they were equipped with an improved Worthington BL-2 type feedwater heater and an HT-type standard stoker. Certain parts were fabricated of alternative materials instead of steel to abide by wartime restrictions.

The Y5s, and Y6s, and Y6as were assigned as all-purpose locomotives and operated across the N&W system. They pulled drag-speed coal trains out of the Blue Ridge Mountains, they pulled merchandise freight trains, they operated as mine-shifters on branch lines, they served as switchers and humpers in yards, and they pushed heavy trains up steep grades.

=== Revenue service ===
One assignment the Y6s received was to haul 6,600-short-ton (6,000 t; 5,900-long-ton) coal trains westbound out of Cedar Bluff, and over the N&W's Dry Fork Branch into Iaeger, West Virginia, where they would then haul 14,500-short-ton (13,200 t; 12,900-long-ton) coal trains into Williamson and Portsmouth, Ohio. From there, the Mallets would either haul 13,500-short-ton (12,200 t; 12,100-long-ton) trains up the Scioto Division to Columbus, or haul 6,800-short-ton (6,200 t; 6,100-long-ton) trains to Cincinnati.

The Y6s were also assigned to haul 3,600-short-ton (3,300 t; 3,200-long-ton) coal trains eastbound from Cedar Bluff to Bluefield, where the trains would be increased to 10,300 short tons (9,300 t; 9,200 long tons), and then the Mallets would haul them to Roanoke. From there, the trains would be decreased to 8,000 short tons (7,300 t; 7,100 long tons) and hauled through the Norfolk Division eastbound to Crewe, where a Z1 class 2-6-6-2—which would later be succeeded by a Y3 class 2-8-8-2 on this route—would take it to Lambert's Point near Norfolk.

After World War II, the Y6 and Y6a class, along with the Y3s and class As, were permitted to haul 14,500-short-ton (13,200 t; 12,900-long-ton) coal trains on the Crewe—Lambert's Point route, unassisted. Most of the N&W's routes consisted of multiple steep grades, where the number of cars a Y6a was allowed to pull was limited, and a pusher was required for assistance.

In 1955 and 1956, after the N&W realized the economic challenges of keeping an all-steam roster, the railway decided to order some RS-11 locomotives from ALCO and GP9s from EMD to dieselize two of their eastern divisions. No. 2156 and some of the other Y6as were reassigned to operate solely as mine-shifters in coal fields. In early April 1958, Stuart T. Saunders succeeded Robert H. Smith as president of the N&W, and the former made the decision to completely dieselize the N&W railway, with several additional GP9s quickly being ordered.

== Class Y6b ==
Norfolk and Western Y6b
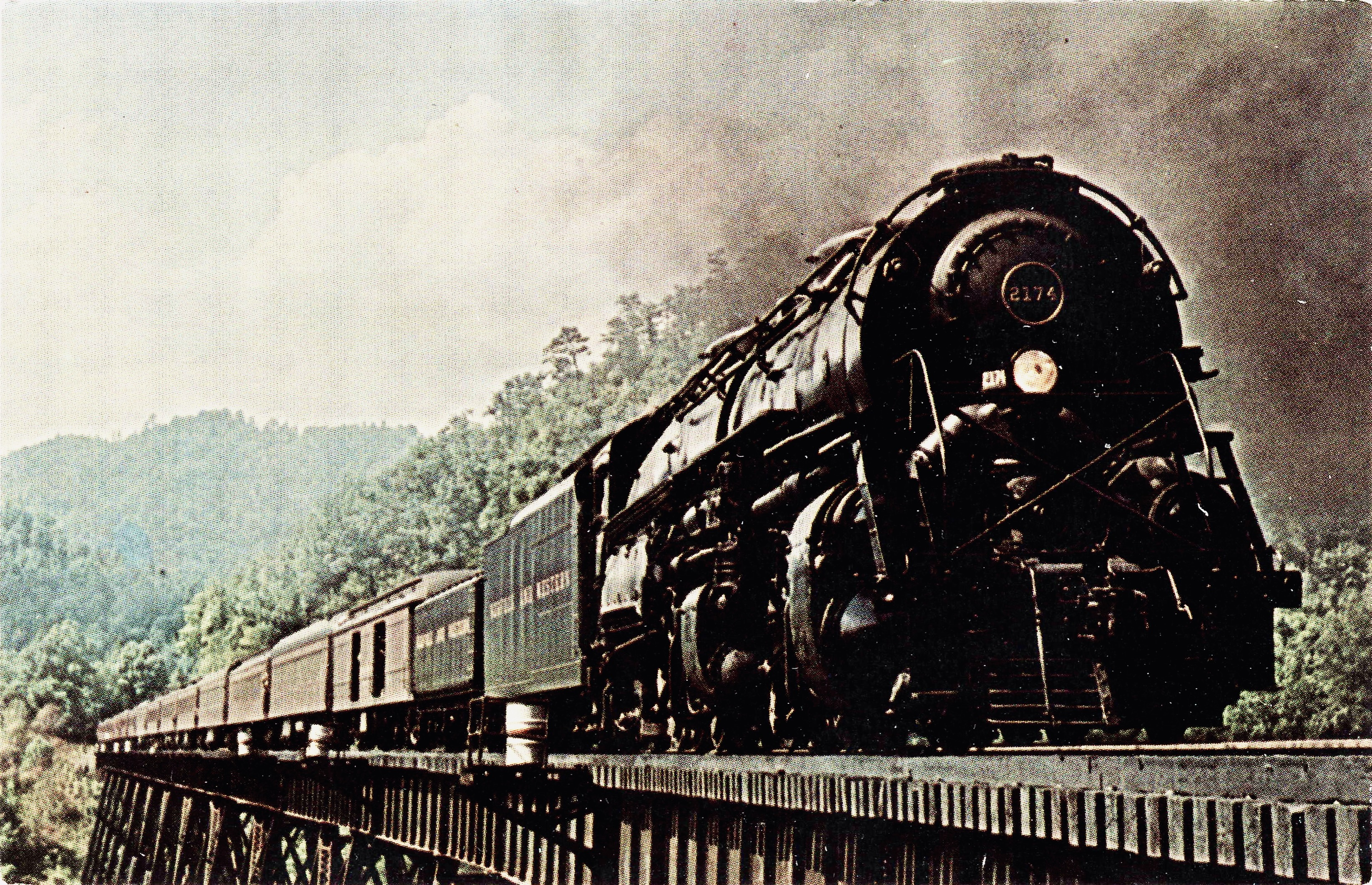
Type and origin
- Power type: Steam
- Builder: N&W's Roanoke Shops
- Build date: 1948–1952
- Total produced: 30
Specifications
- Configuration
  - Whyte: 2-8-8-2
  - UIC: (1′D)D1′ h4v
- Gauge: 4 ft 8 1/2 in (1,435 mm) standard gauge
- Leading dia.: 30 in (762 mm)
- Driver dia.: 58 in (1,473 mm)
- Trailing dia.: 30 in (762 mm)
- Tender wheels: 33 in (838 mm)
- Wheelbase: 103 ft 8 1/4 in (31.60 m)
  - Engine: 58 ft 0 in (17.68 m)
  - Drivers: 42 ft 4 in (12.90 m)
- Length
  - Over couplers: 114 ft 10 1/2 in (35.01 m)
- Height: 15 ft 8 9/16 in (4.79 m)
- Axle load
  - Leading: 34,640 lb (15.7 tonnes)
  - Trailing: 28,300 lb (12.8 tonnes)
- Adhesive weight: 548,500 lb (248.8 tonnes)
- Loco weight: 611,520 lb (277.4 tonnes)
- Total weight: 900,120 lb (408.3 tonnes)
- Fuel type: Coal
- Fuel capacity: 30 t (30 long tons; 33 short tons)
- Water cap.: 22,000 US gal (83,000 L; 18,000 imp gal)
- Firebox
  - Grate area: 106.2 sq ft (9.87 m^{2})
- Boiler
  - Model: Radial Stay
  - Diameter: 102 1/2 in (2,604 mm)
  - Small tubes: 2 1/4 in (57 mm)
  - Large tubes: 5 1/2 in (140 mm)
- Boiler pressure: 300 psi (2.07 MPa)
- Feedwater heater: Worthington SA
- Heating surface
  - Firebox: 371 sq ft (34.5 m^{2})
  - Arch tubes: 59 sq ft (5.5 m^{2})
  - Flues: 5,226 sq ft (485.5 m^{2})
  - Total surface: 7,431 sq ft (690.4 m^{2})
- Superheater
  - Type: Type A
  - Heating area: 1,478 sq ft (137.3 m^{2})
- Cylinders: Four: two low-pressure (front), two high-pressure (rear)
- High-pressure cylinder: 25 in × 32 in (635 mm × 813 mm)
- Low-pressure cylinder: 39 in × 32 in (991 mm × 813 mm)
- Valve gear: Baker
Performance figures
- Maximum speed: 50 mph (80 km/h)
- Power output: 5,600 hp (4,200 kW) (as built 4,400 hp (3,300 kW))
- Tractive effort: (Simple: 170,000 lbf (756.2 kN)) (Compound: 126,838 lbf (564.2 kN))
- Factor of adh.: 3.30
Career
- Operators: Norfolk and Western Railway
- Class: Y6b
- Numbers: 2171–2200
- Disposition: All scrapped

=== Construction and service ===
After World War II ended, the N&W decided to construct a bypass grade in their Bluefield Division, to discontinue their electrified section there. The end of their electrification, along with the post-war growth for the coal industry, encouraged the N&W to add more mallets to their roster, and the Railway's mechanical engineering team made multiple upgrades to the existing Y6 design. The newly-developed locomotive, the Y6b class (Nos. 2171-2200), were more powerful than the Y5s and Y6s were, with their tractive effort being rated at 166,000 lbf (738.40 kN) with simple expansion.

Their boilers were also longer in length; the size of their combustion chamber in their firebox was increased from 42 inches (1,100 mm) to 84 inches (2,100 mm); and the upper portion of their smokebox was extended forward to accommodate a Worthington SA feedwater heater. The latter modification resulted in Nos. 2171-2194 initially being built with small "oblong" smokebox doors, but due to limited access for crews, they were later replaced with conventional round doors.

Other modifications made for the Y6bs included roller bearings for all of the tender axles, a larger diameter smokestack, and a manual reducing valve to switch the mallet between simple and compound operations at any speed. The Y6bs still retained some features that were previously applied to their predecessors, including a boiler pressure of 300 psi (2.07 MPa), 58-inch (1,500 mm) diameter driving wheels, and tenders that held 30 short tons (60,000 lb) of coal and 20,000 US gallons (76,000 L) of water. The final Y6b, No. 2200, was completed in April 1952; three years after Baldwin Locomotive Works built the final domestic steam locomotive in the United States.

Also in 1952, Y6b No. 2197 was built with a booster valve that allowed superheated high-pressure steam into the low-pressure cylinders, resulting in its tractive effort being boosted to 170,000 lbf (756.20 kN). 13 short tons (26,000 lb)had to be added to its front chassis frame to prevent wheel slippage, and all of the other Y6bs were subsequently rebuilt with these upgrades.

=== Steam vs. diesel tests, upgrades, and controversies ===
Coal traffic was N&W's largest source of revenue, and it had arguably the most modern and efficient steam locomotives of any major U.S. railroad. Accordingly, N&W resisted conversion from coal-burning steam locomotives to oil-burning diesels longer than most. In 1952, N&W tested its A class and Y6b class locomotives against a four-unit Electro-Motive Division F7 diesel set. The tests indicated that fuel costs and similar items were roughly the same, and the test was considered a tie. However, diesels eventually won out for lower maintenance and other operational costs.

Retrospective analyses of these tests have led to suggestions that diesel locomotive builder EMD and N&W cheated in the competition by using locomotives with secret modifications unsuited for daily work. However, the greater weight of evidence and analysis indicates that N&W did not cheat on these tests, and that the only improvements were the ones N&W publicized and later incorporated into many locomotives. Also, the major participants in this debate all appear to agree that N&W did ultimately modify most of its Y5, Y6, Y6a, and Y6b locomotives with a new "intercepting/reducing valve" and ballast on the front engine, which increased their tractive effort.

=== Excursion service and scrapping ===
On July 11, 1959, No. 2174 was tasked to haul an eighteen-car Farewell to Steam excursion on the N&W mainline alongside 2-6-6-4 A class locomotive No. 1240. No. 1240 pulled the excursion from Roanoke, Virginia to Bluefield, West Virginia, where the train was transferred to No. 2174. The Y6b pulled it through the N&W's Pocahontas Division to Iaeger, and then it traveled over the Dry Fork Branch to Cedar Bluff. No. 2174 returned the excursion to Bluefield, and then No. 1240 returned the train to Roanoke.

Following the excursion, No. 2174 was sold to the United Iron & Metal Company, and the locomotive was stored in their scrapyard in Roanoke, along with fellow Y6b No. 2189 and Y6 No. 2143. The rest of the Y6b class was scrapped, between 1958 and 1961. The United Iron hadn't prioritized the scrapping of the three Mallets, since they had already scrapped multiple other locomotives. By 1971, No. 2189 was scrapped, and No. 2174 and the tender-lacking No. 2143 remained in a corner of the company's yard.

During 1975, some local preservationists, including the Roanoke Chapter of the National Railway Historical Society (NRHS), made an attempt to acquire No. 2174. The Roanoke Chapter made a commitment to raise $1,000 to cosmetically restore the Y6b, but they did not have enough time to raise $50,000—the locomotive's scrap value—to purchase the locomotive. Also in 1975, United Iron was purchased by the British-based Bird International Company, and due to a slump in the steel industry at the time, the company ordered for Nos. 2143 and 2174 to be dismantled. In January 1976, No. 2143 was scrapped, and the following month, on February 11, the scrapping process on No. 2174 began. This decision stirred controversy among local railfans, including retired N&W employees who had operated Mallets in revenue service.

== Accidents and incidents ==
- On September 24, 1950, Y6b No. 2188 was operating on a freight run when it derailed, flipped over and rolled down an embankment at Alnwick, West Virginia.
- On December 12, 1955, Y6 No. 2153 was on a train run when it suffered a crown sheet failure and an ensuing catastrophic boiler explosion, which destroyed the cab of the locomotive as well as blasting the smokebox door off its hinges. This occurred in Wytheville, Virginia.

== Preservation ==
Only one of the Y6a's, No. 2156, has been preserved. In July 1959, after No. 2156 was retired from service, the N&W donated the Y6a to the National Museum of Transportation (MoT) in Kirkwood, Missouri, with Stuart Saunders personally presenting it at a dedication ceremony. The locomotive was then left on outdoor static display. Between 2015 and 2020, No. 2156 was leased to the Virginia Museum of Transportation in Roanoke.

== Gallery ==
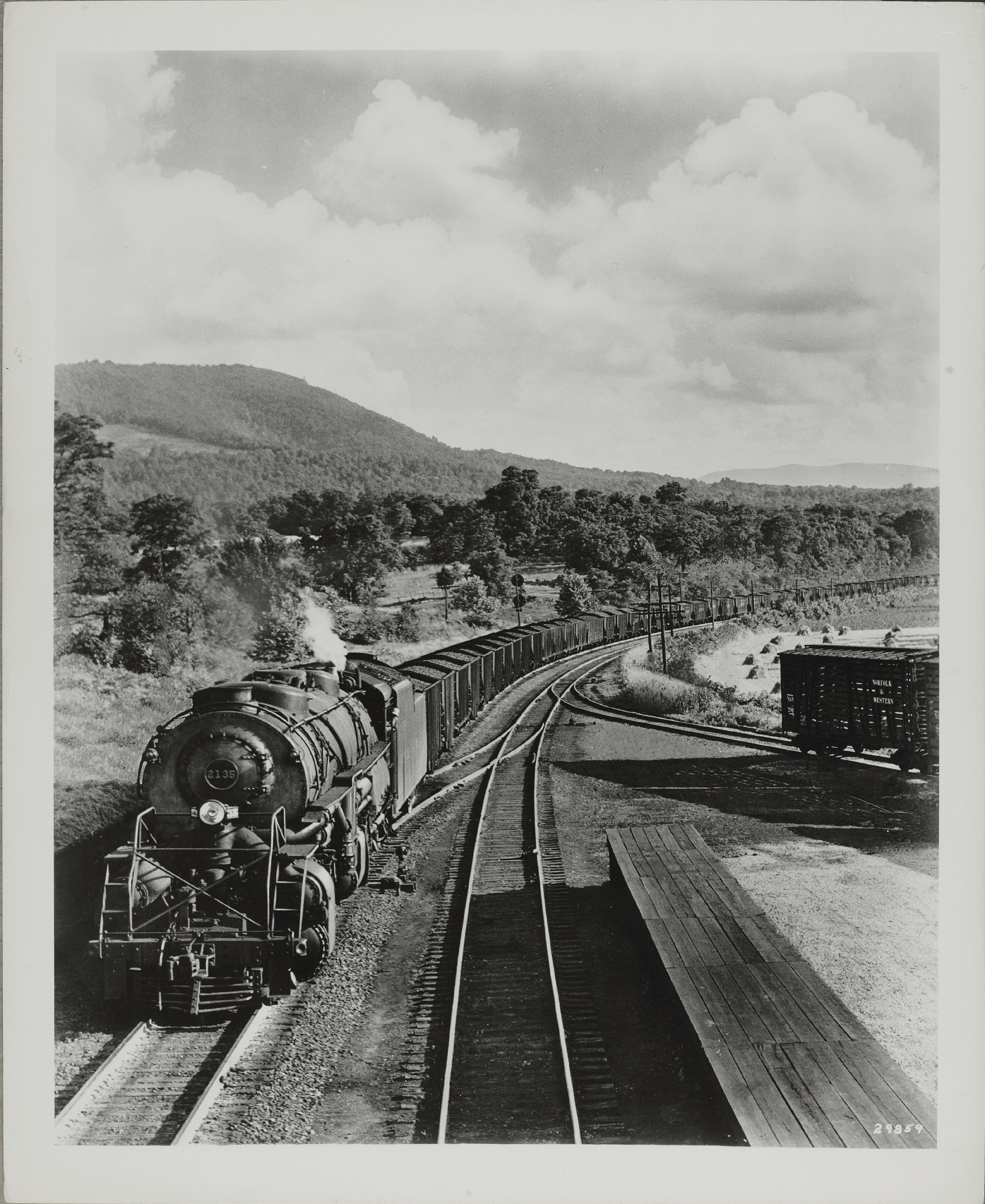
Norfolk & Western Y6 No. 2135 pulling a coal train

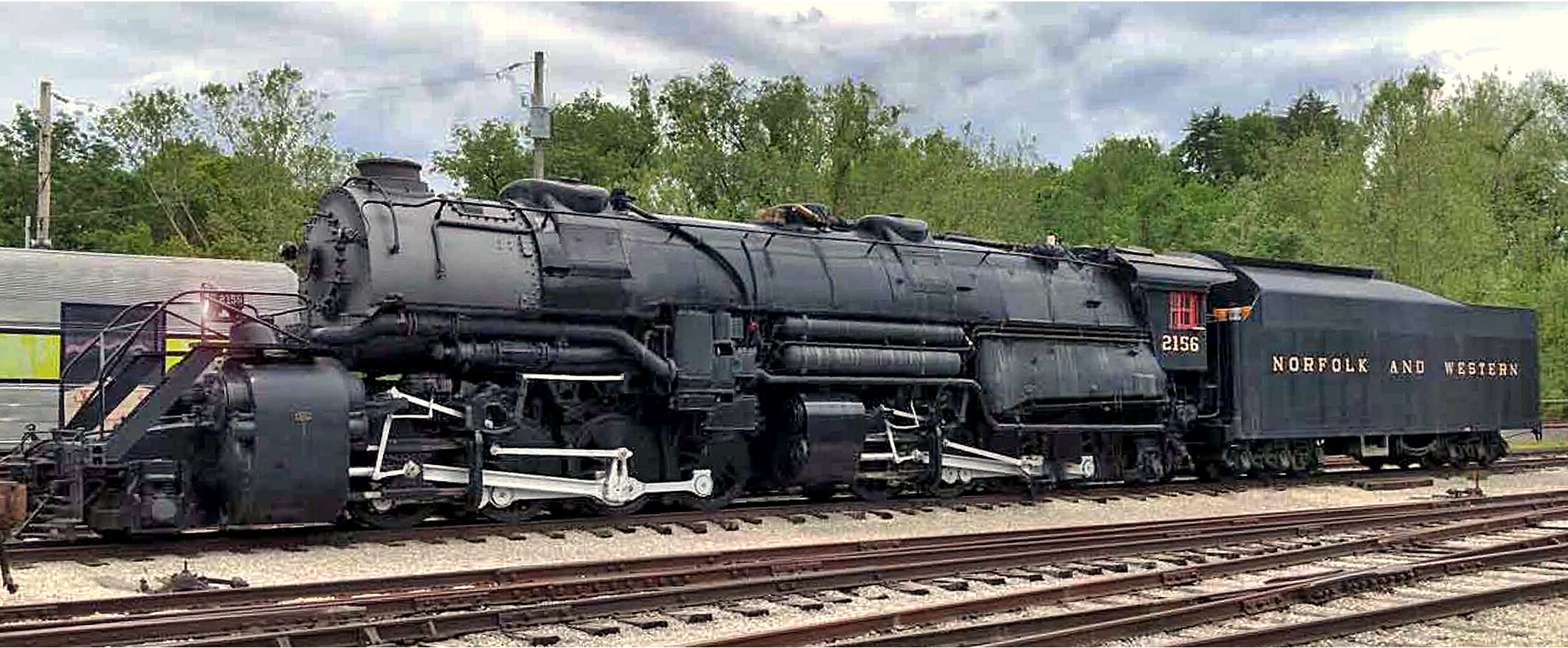
N&W 2156, the sole surviving Y6a, on display at the National Museum of Transportation

== Bibliography ==
- Warden, William E. (1996). Norfolk and Western's Magnificent Mallets. Lynchburg, Virginia: TLC Publishing. p. 10.
- Harris, Nelson (2003-06-17). Norfolk and Western Railway. Arcadia Publishing. ISBN 978-1-4396-2937-6.
- McClure III, William G.; Plant, Jeremy F. (2007). Norfolk & Western Steam in Color. Morning Sun Books. ISBN 978-1582482163.
- Dixon, Thomas W. Jr.; Parker, Karen; Huddleston, Gene (2009). Norfolk & Western's Y-Class Articulated Steam Locomotives. TLC Publishing. ISBN 978-0939487929.
- Schramm, Jeffrey W. (2010). Out of Steam: Dieselization and American Railroad, 1920-1960. Lehigh University Press. ISBN 978-0-9821313-7-4.
- McKinney, Wayne (2014-03-24). Roanoke Locomotive Shops and the Norfolk & Western Railroad. Arcadia Publishing. ISBN 978-1-4396-4491-1.
- Horner, R. R. (1968). "Norfolk and Western Magazine — Volumes 36-37". Norfolk and Western Railway Company.
