= Atlantic Coast Line R-1 class =

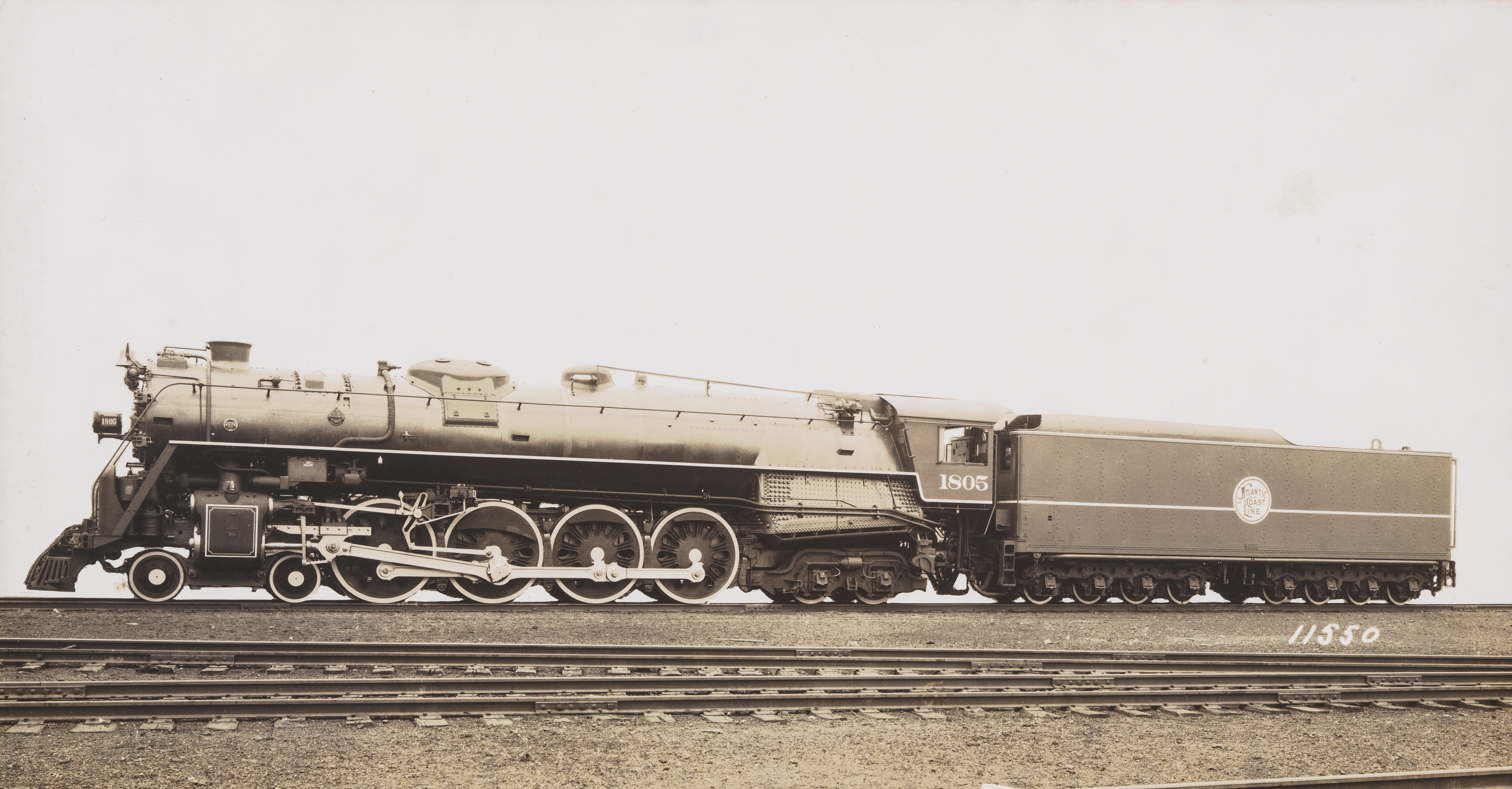
- ACL R-1 class 1805, photographed at Baldwin Locomotive Works in 1938.
Type and origin
- Power type: Steam
- Builder: Baldwin Locomotive Works
- Serial number: 62174-62185
- Build date: March–May 1938
- Total produced: 12
Specifications
- Configuration
  - Whyte: 4-8-4
  - UIC: 2′D2′ h2
- Gauge: 4 ft 8 1/2 in (1,435 mm) standard gauge
- Driver dia.: 80 in (2,032 mm)
- Wheelbase: 97 ft 11 in (29.85 m)
- Height: 16 ft (4,877 mm)
- Axle load: 65,792 lb (29,843 kg; 29.371 long tons)
- Adhesive weight: 263,127 lb (119,352 kg; 117.467 long tons)
- Loco weight: 460,270 lb (208,770 kg; 205.48 long tons)
- Tender weight: 435,500 lb (197,500 kg; 194.4 long tons)
- Total weight: 895,770 lb (406,310 kg; 399.90 long tons)
- Fuel type: Coal
- Fuel capacity: 27 short tons (24 t)
- Water cap.: 24,000 US gal (91,000 L; 20,000 imp gal)
- Firebox
  - Grate area: 97.75 sq ft (9.081 m^{2})
- Boiler: 86 3/16 in (2,189 mm)
- Boiler pressure: 275 lbf/in^{2} (1.90 MPa)
- Heating surface
  - Firebox: 568 sq ft (52.8 m^{2})
  - Total surface: 4,749 sq ft (441.2 m^{2})
- Superheater
  - Type: Type 'A'
  - Heating area: 1,497 sq ft (139.1 m^{2})
- Cylinders: Two
- Cylinder size: 27 in × 30 in (686 mm × 762 mm)
- Valve gear: Walschaert
Performance figures
- Maximum speed: 100 mph (160 km/h)
- Tractive effort: 63,900 lbf (284.24 kN)
- Factor of adh.: 4.12
Career
- Operators: Atlantic Coast Line
- Class: R-1
- Numbers: 1800–1811
- Retired: 1951-1952
- Disposition: All scrapped

The Atlantic Coast Line R-1 was a class of 12 4-8-4 Northern type steam locomotives built by Baldwin Locomotive Works (BLW) in 1938. Twelve of them were built to pull the Atlantic Coast Line's (ACL) demanding mainline passenger trains such as the Florida Special, Havana Special, and Tamiami, pulling 20 or 21 passenger cars without stopping for an engine change between Richmond, Virginia and Jacksonville, Florida.

== History ==
During the mid-1930s, the Atlantic Coast Line (ACL) Railroad's P-5-A class 4-6-2 Pacifics could not handle more than 12 passenger cars and would require double-heading due to an increase in passenger business. In 1938, ACL began a noble experiment with modern steam power and ordered twelve R-1 4-8-4 Northerns from Baldwin Locomotive Works (BLW) to handle the heavier passenger trains, eliminating the need for double-heading and ran extra sections of many of the Richmond, Virginia to Jacksonville, Florida passenger trains. While they were more powerful than the P-5-As as well as being faster, running as fast as 90 mph and probably 100 mph without much trouble reaching such speeds. However, the R-1s had poor counterbalancing and were returned to Baldwin to solve the problem. When delivered, they had a bad dynamic augment. Even after the rebuild with new disk driving wheels, they still had unacceptable amounts of dynamic augment at high speeds, as their counterbalancing weights were too high, which led to the locomotive's drivers pounding at high speeds and was said that the main drivers actually left the rails and repeatedly slammed back down, kinking rails and damaging track alignment for miles.

Despite their flaws, they were capable pullers. No. 1800 accelerated a 20-car, 1500-ton passenger train from a dead stop to 70 miles per hour in 11 1/2 minutes and 11 miles in a test. The class also ran as many as 18,000 miles a month in passenger service. R-1s Nos. 1800, 1801, 1806, 1807, 1808 and 1809 ran even more smoothly once they were fitted with lightweight pistons by Timken, piston rods, cross heads, and, probably most important, tapered main rods with roller bearing wrist pins. The class is rated at 6,200 tons on the Richmond to Jacksonville mainline. With dieselization taking effect, the locomotives were put in freight service. Retirement started in 1951 and by 1952, all have been retired.

== Tenders ==
The R-1 class were equipped with very large tenders holding 24,000 US gallons (91,000 L; 20,000 imp gal) of water and 27 short tons (24 long tons) of coal. They were mounted on a pair of eight-wheel trucks. The weight of the tender, fully loaded was 217 short tons (194 long tons) In 1953, ten of the R-1 tenders were sold to the Norfolk and Western Railway (N&W), where they were paired with their Y4 class 2-8-8-2 compound mallets, until they were all scrapped in 1958.

== Disposition ==
None of the R-1s have been preserved, as all were scrapped by 1952 and the remaining ten tenders lasted on the N&W until 1958.

== Roster ==
Number	Baldwin serial number	Date built	Disposition	Notes
1800	62174	March 1938	Scrapped on December 20, 1951.	
1801	62175	March 1938	Scrapped on June 20, 1952.	
1802	62176	March 1938	Scrapped on June 20, 1952.	
1803	62177	March 1938	Scrapped on December 20, 1951.	
1804	62178	March 1938	Scrapped on December 20, 1951.	
1805	62179	March 1938	Scrapped on December 20, 1951.	
1806	62180	May 1938	Scrapped on December 31, 1952.	
1807	62181	May 1938	Scrapped on December 31, 1952.	
1808	62182	May 1938	Scrapped on June 20, 1952.	
1809	62183	May 1938	Scrapped on December 20, 1951.	
1810	62184	May 1938	Scrapped on December 31, 1952.	
1811	62185	May 1938	Scrapped on June 20, 1952.	

== Bibliography ==
- Prince, Richard E. (1966). Atlantic Coast Line Railroad: Steam Locomotives, Ships, and History (1st ed.). Wheelwright Lithographing Company. SBN 9600088-2-9.
- Tillotson Jr., Curt (2000). Classic Steam Trains of the South (1st ed.). TLC Publishing. ISBN 1-883089-55-7.
