= Norfolk and Western 2156 =

Preserved N&W Y6a class 2-8-8-2 locomotive

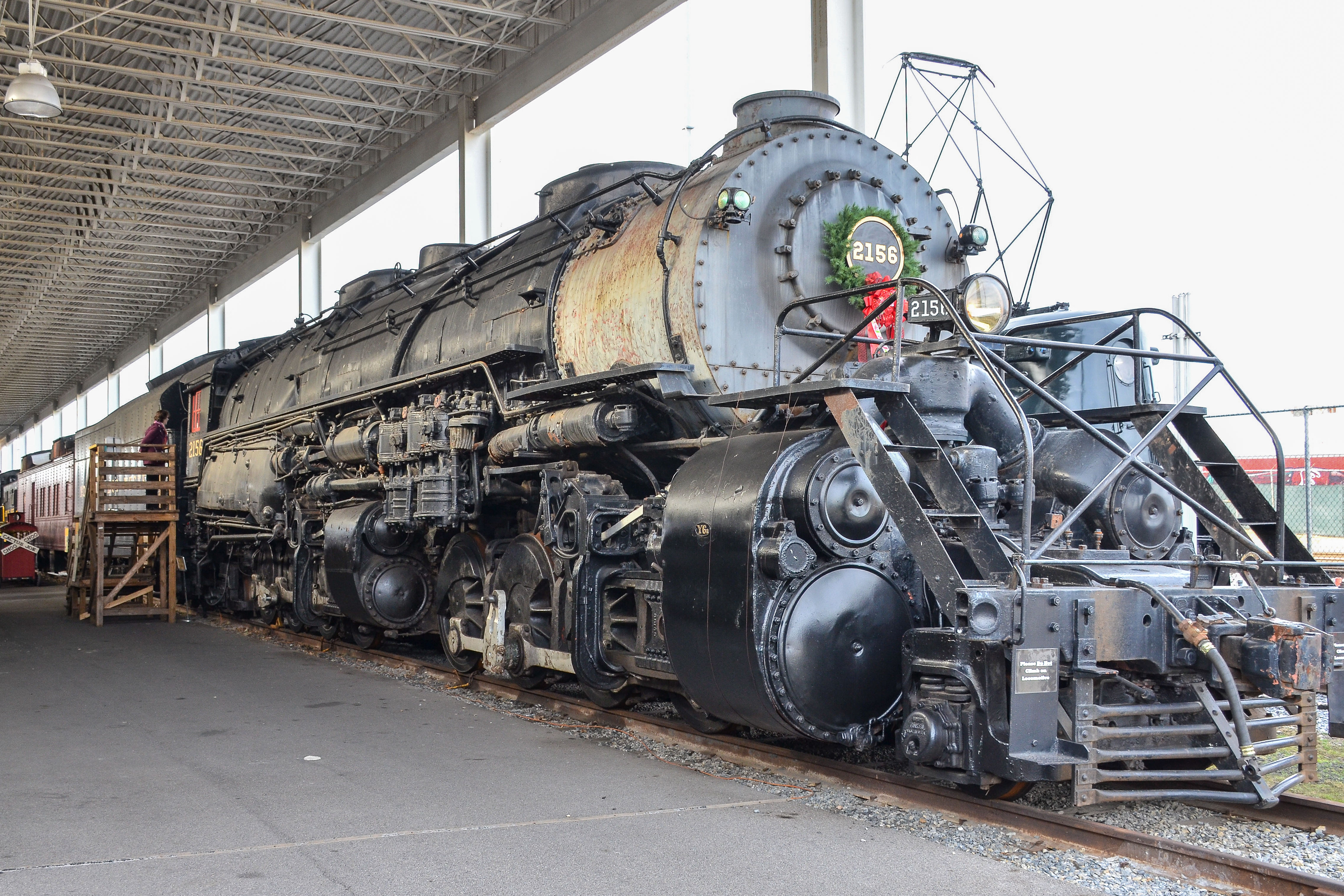
- N&W 2156 on display at the Virginia Museum of Transportation in Roanoke, Virginia, on December 11, 2016
Type and origin
- Power type: Steam
- Builder: Roanoke Shops (East End Shops)
- Serial number: 317
- Build date: March 19, 1942
Specifications
- Configuration
  - Whyte: 2-8-8-2
  - UIC: (1′D)D1′ hv4
- Gauge: 4 ft 8 1/2 in (1,435 mm)
- Leading dia.: 30 in (762 mm)
- Driver dia.: 58 in (1,473 mm) (as built 57 in (1,448 mm))
- Trailing dia.: 30 in (762 mm)
- Tender wheels: 33 in (838 mm)
- Wheelbase: 103 ft 8 1/4 in (31.60 m)
  - Engine: 58 ft 0 in (17.68 m)
- Length
  - Over couplers: 114 ft 10 1/2 in (35.01 m)
- Height: 15 ft 8 7/16 in (4.79 m)
- Adhesive weight: 522,850 lb (237.2 tonnes)
- Loco weight: 582,900 lb (264.4 tonnes)
- Tender weight: 143,200 lb (65.0 tonnes)) (empty); 378,600 lb (171.7 tonnes)) (loaded)
- Total weight: 961,500 lb (436.1 tonnes))
- Fuel type: Coal
- Fuel capacity: 30 t (29.5 long tons; 33.1 short tons)
- Water cap.: 22,000 US gal (83,000 L; 18,000 imp gal)
- Firebox
  - Grate area: 106.2 sq ft (9.87 m^{2})
- Boiler
  - Model: 104 in (2,642 mm)
  - Small tubes: 2 1/4 in (57 mm)
  - Large tubes: 5 1/2 in (140 mm)
- Boiler pressure: 300 psi (2.07 MPa)
- Safety valve: 4 Ashton 3 1/2 in (89 mm)
- Feedwater heater: Worthington BL-2
- Heating surface
  - Firebox: 371 sq ft (34.5 m^{2})
  - Arch tubes: 59 sq ft (5.5 m^{2})
  - Flues: 5,226 sq ft (485.5 m^{2})
  - Total surface: 7,431 sq ft (690.4 m^{2})
- Superheater
  - Type: Type A
  - Heating area: 1,775 sq ft (164.9 m^{2})
- Cylinders: Four: two low-pressure (front), two high-pressure (rear)
- High-pressure cylinder: 25 in × 32 in (635 mm × 813 mm)
- Low-pressure cylinder: 39 in × 32 in (991 mm × 813 mm)
- Valve gear: Baker
- Valve type: Piston valves
- Loco brake: Air
- Train brakes: Air
- Couplers: Knuckle
Performance figures
- Maximum speed: 50 mph (80 km/h)
- Power output: 5,600 hp (4,200 kW) (as built 4,400 hp (3,300 kW))
- Tractive effort: (Simple: 166,000 lbf (738.4 kN)) (Compound: 126,838 lbf (564.2 kN)) (as built 152,206 lbf (677.0 kN))
- Factor of adh.: 3.30
Career
- Operators: Norfolk and Western Railway
- Class: Y6a
- Number in class: 2 of 16
- Numbers: N&W 2156
- Locale: United States, South and Midwest
- Retired: July 1959
- Restored: 1985 (cosmetically)
- Current owner: National Museum of Transportation, St. Louis, Missouri
- Disposition: On static display

Norfolk and Western 2156 is a preserved Y6a class 2-8-8-2 compound Mallet steam locomotive. The Norfolk and Western Railway (N&W) built it in 1942 at its East End Shops in Roanoke, Virginia, as the second member of the N&W's Y6a class.

No. 2156 was retired from revenue service in July 1959, and it is now owned by the National Museum of Transportation in St. Louis, Missouri. In 2014, the museum leased it for five years to the Virginia Museum of Transportation in Roanoke. It was towed to Roanoke in May 2015 and towed back to St. Louis in June 2020.

== Construction and design ==
In the 1930s, the Norfolk and Western Railway's (N&W) mechanical engineering team explored ways to refine the Y series 2-8-8-2 compound Mallets, since the public demand for coal was increasing despite the effects of the Great Depression. The railroad used the United States Railroad Administration's (USRA) 2-8-8-2 design for its Y4 class, then improved upon it for the Y5 locomotives, built in 1930 and 1931.

The Y6 shared the Y5's specifications but had design changes for efficiency: cast steel frames connected by a pin hinge; outside frame bearings on the pilot and trailing trucks; roller bearings for all the wheel journals; and automatic lubricators. The Y5s would later be rebuilt with most of these modifications. (Note: Y5s Nos. 2090-2099 were renumbered to 2110-2119, after being rebuilt.)

The Y6 proved reliable and about as easy to maintain as diesel locomotives, so in 1942, the N&W decided to build sixteen more (Nos. 2155-2170) to handle the increasing military traffic from World War II. These new Mallets were classified as Y6as to note new features such as an improved Worthington BL-2 type feedwater heater and an HT-type standard stoker. Certain parts were fabricated out of alternative materials instead of steel to abide with wartime restrictions.

== History ==
=== Tonnage ratings and revenue service ===
No. 2156 was the second member of the Y6a class, having rolled out of the East End Shops, on March 19, 1942, and it was quickly placed into service. The Y6as, along with the Y5s and Y6s, were assigned as all-purpose locomotives and operated all across the N&W system; they pulled drag-speed coal trains out of the Blue Ridge Mountains; they pulled merchandise freight trains; they operated as mine-shifters on branch lines; they served as switchers and humpers in yards; and they pushed heavy trains up steep grades.

One assignment the Y6as received was to haul 6,600-short-ton (6,000 t; 5,900-long-ton) coal trains westbound out of Cedar Bluff, and over the N&W's Dry Fork Branch into Iaeger, West Virginia, where they would then haul 14,500-short-ton (13,200 t; 12,900-long-ton) coal trains into Williamson and Portsmouth, Ohio. From there, the mallets would either haul 13,500-short-ton (12,200 t; 12,100-long-ton) trains up the Scioto Division to Columbus, or haul 6,800-short-ton (6,200 t; 6,100-long-ton) trains to Cincinnati.

The Y6as were also assigned to haul 3,600-short-ton (3,300 t; 3,200-long-ton) coal trains eastbound from Cedar Bluff to Bluefield, where the trains would be increased to 10,300 short tons (9,300 t; 9,200 long tons), and then the mallets would haul them to Roanoke. From there, the trains would be decreased to 8,000 short tons (7,300 t; 7,100 long tons) and hauled through the Norfolk Division eastbound to Crewe, where a Z1 class 2-6-6-2—which would later be succeeded by a Y3 class 2-8-8-2 on this route—would take it to Lambert's Point near Norfolk.

After World War II, the Y6 and Y6a class, along with the Y3s and Class As, were permitted to haul 14,500-short-ton (13,200 t; 12,900-long-ton) coal trains on the Crewe—Lambert's Point route, unassisted. Most of the N&W's routes consisted of multiple steep grades, where the number of cars a Y6a was allowed to pull was limited, and a pusher was required for assistance. In 1955 and 1956, after the N&W realized the economic challenges of keeping an all-steam roster, the railway decided to order some RS-11 locomotives from ALCO and GP9s from EMD to dieselize two of their eastern divisions. No. 2156 and some of the other Y6as were reassigned to operate solely as mine-shifters in coal fields. In early April 1958, Stuart T. Saunders succeeded Robert Hall Smith as president of the N&W, and the former made the decision to completely dieselize the N&W railway, with several additional GP9s quickly being ordered.

=== Retirement ===
In July 1959, after No. 2156 was retired from service, the N&W donated the Y6a to the National Museum of Transportation (MoT) in Kirkwood, Missouri, with Stuart Saunders personally presenting it at a dedication ceremony. The locomotive was then left on outdoor static display.

In 1985, No. 2156 received a cosmetic restoration performed by members and volunteers of the St. Louis Steam Train Association, with the intention of having the locomotive displayed at the newly renovated St. Louis Union Station for a year. In August, restoration work was completed, and No. 2156 was temporarily displayed at the station, next to Union Pacific EMD E9 No. 951.

In 2014, it was announced that the Virginia Museum of Transportation (VMT) reached an agreement with the MoT to lease the No. 2156 locomotive for display at their location in Roanoke for five years, and in exchange, the VMT's former EMD FT demonstrator B unit would be moved to St. Louis for display with EMD FT demonstrator No. 103. Norfolk Southern (NS) facilitated the transaction, and the railroad being tasked to cosmetically restore the MoT's EMD DDA40X No. 6944 was also part of the arrangement. No. 2156 was removed from display and prepped for long-distance shipping; the locomotive had to undergo an inspection for shipping eligibility, its friction bearings had to be lubricated, and it had to be coupled to some support cars.

On May 9, 2015, No. 2156 began its 700-mile (1,100 km) eastbound ferry move to Roanoke. It was first transferred by the St. Louis Terminal Railroad over the Union Pacific mainline from the MoT interchange in Kirkwood, to East St. Louis. From there, NS towed No. 2156, along with some passenger coaches, through Decatur, Illinois, Fort Wayne, Indiana, and Bellevue, Ohio, before the remainder of the move occurred over former N&W rails. No. 2156 arrived at the VMT, on May 12. On May 31, No. 2156 was publicly displayed side by side with N&W A class No. 1218 and the recently restored J class No. 611, reuniting the N&W's "Big Three" trio.

In January 2020, the VMT began negotiations with the MoT to either extend the five-year lease or outright purchase No. 2156, in an effort to keep the Y6a in Roanoke. By May, when the five-year lease expired, the two museums failed to reach an agreement. On June 10, No. 2156 left the VMT in another ferry move on NS, and it returned to the MoT, on June 15.

== Gallery ==
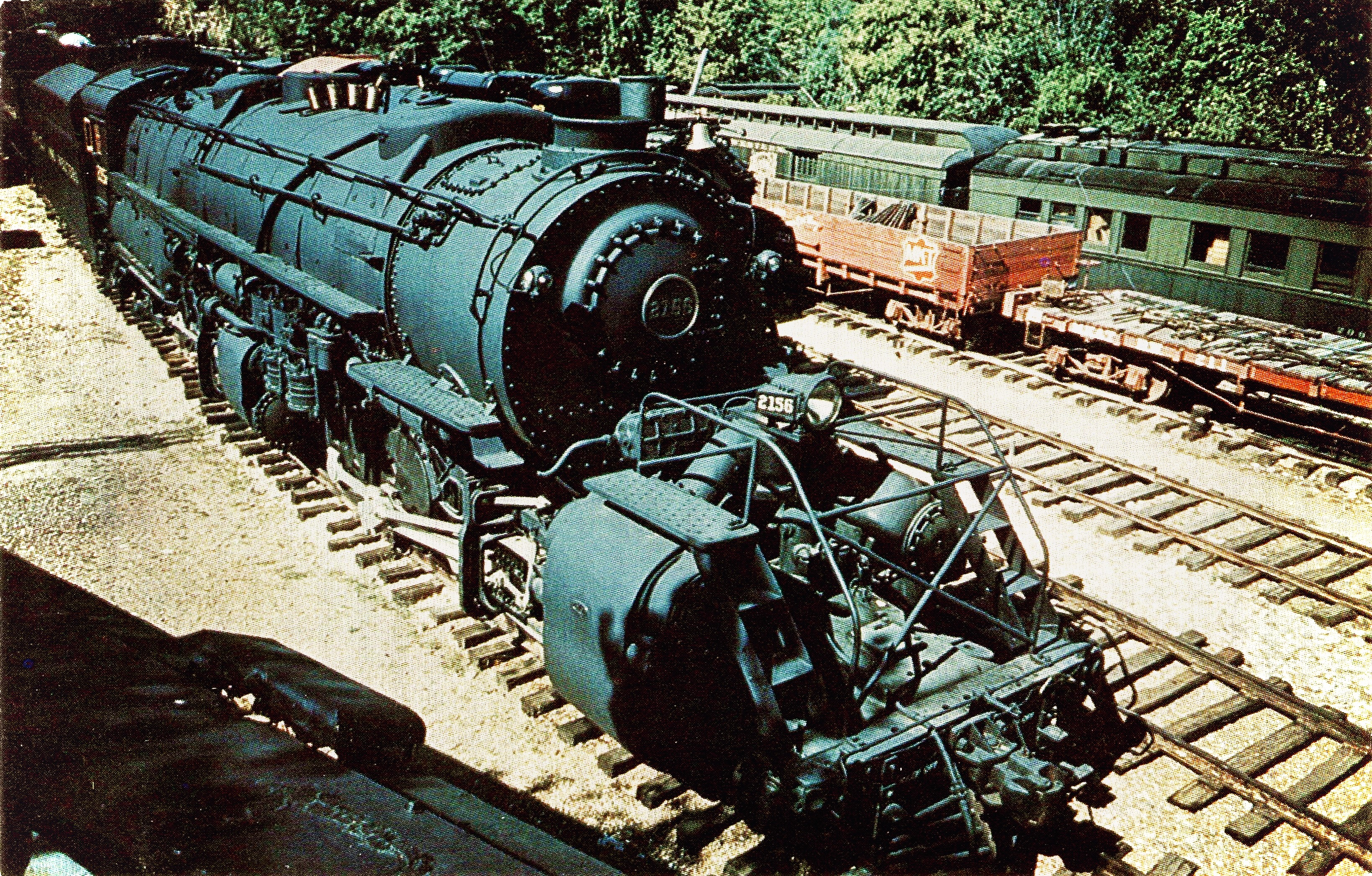
No. 2156 on static display at the Museum of Transportation, during the museum’s early years

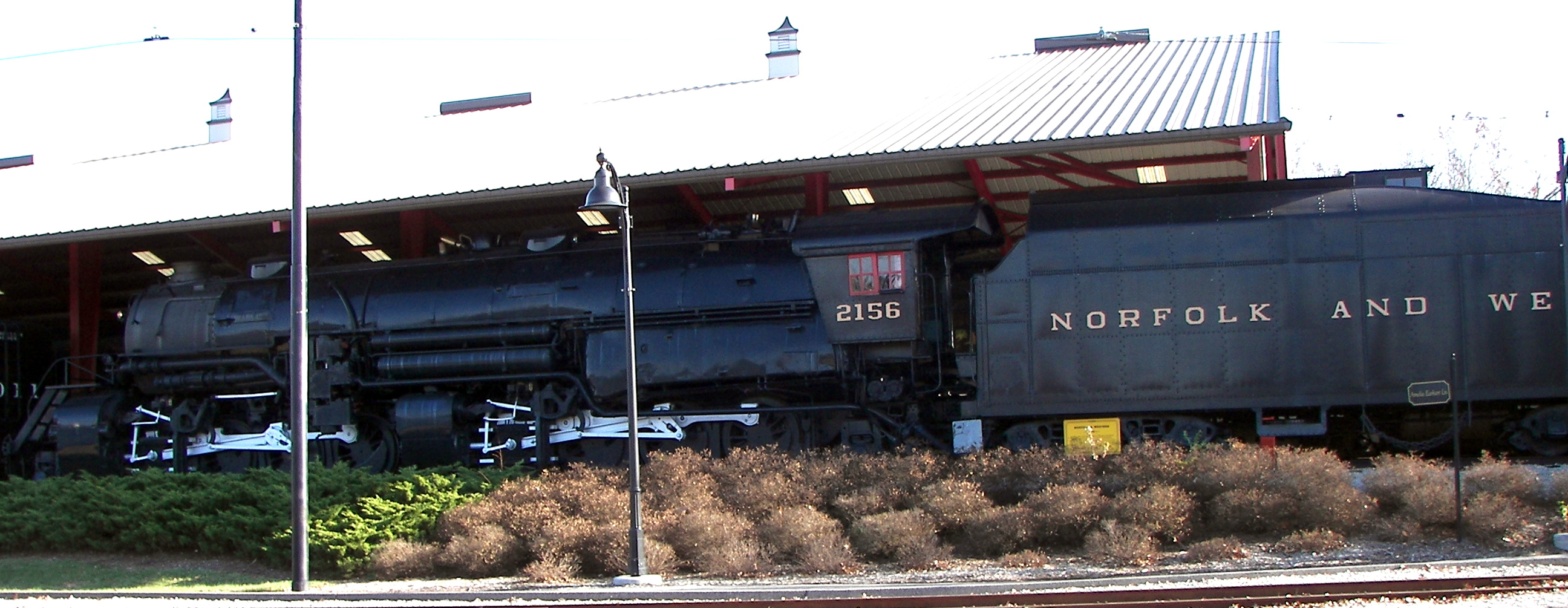
No. 2156 on display at the Museum of Transportation in November 2008

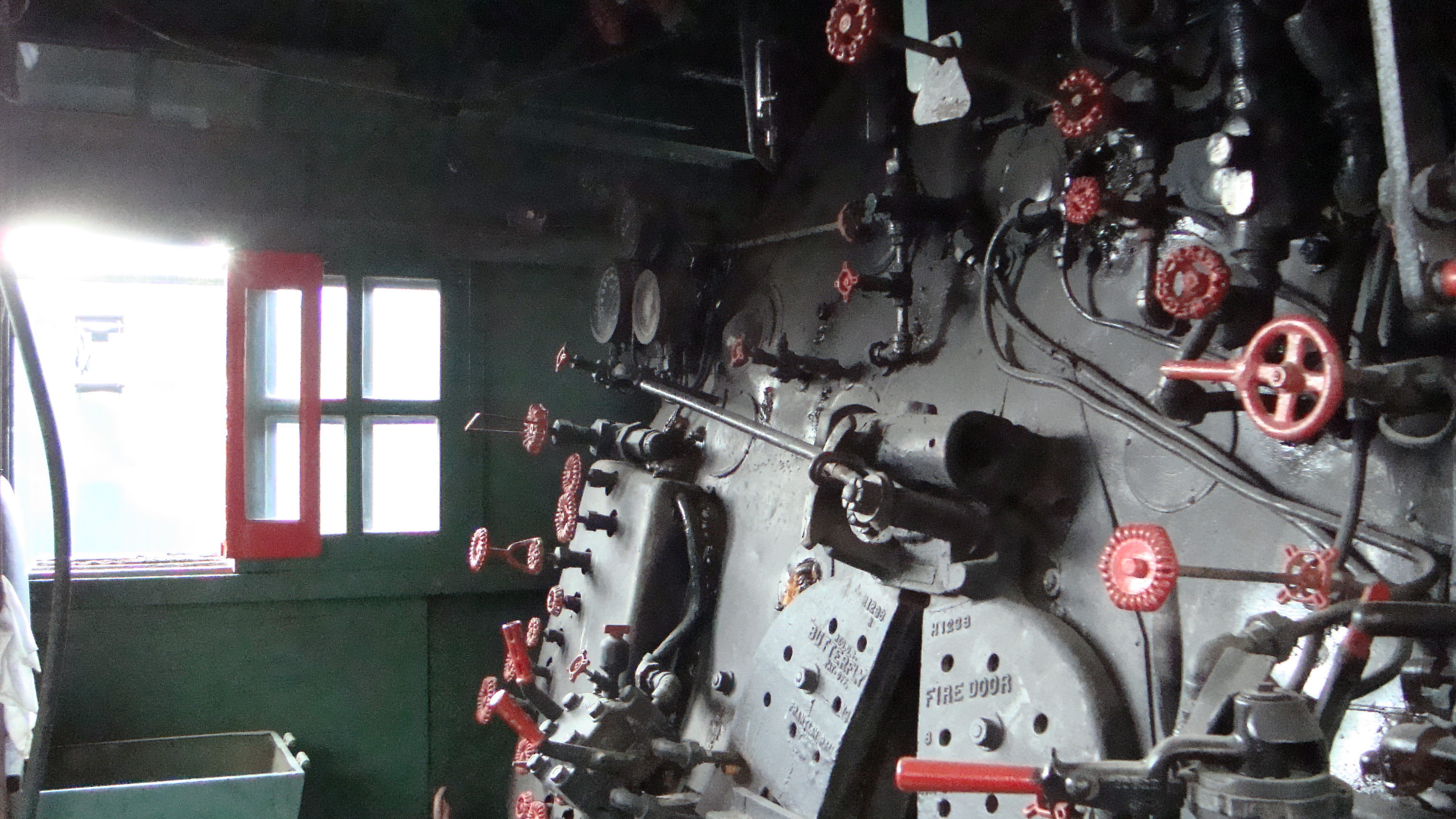
The interior of No. 2156’s cab

== See also ==
- Norfolk and Western 2050
- Norfolk and Western 2174
- Southern Pacific 4294
- Union Pacific 4014
- Western Maryland Scenic Railroad 1309

== Bibliography ==
- Dixon, Thomas W. Jr.; Parker, Karen; Huddleston, Gene (2009). Norfolk & Western's Y-Class Articulated Steam Locomotives. TLC Publishing.
- McClure, III, William G.; Plant, Jeremy F. (2007). Norfolk & Western Steam in Color (1st ed.). Morning Sun Books. ISBN 978-1-58248-216-3. Archived from the original on August 2, 2023.
