= Norfolk and Western classes Y3 and Y3a =

Class of 80 American 2-8-8-2 locomotive

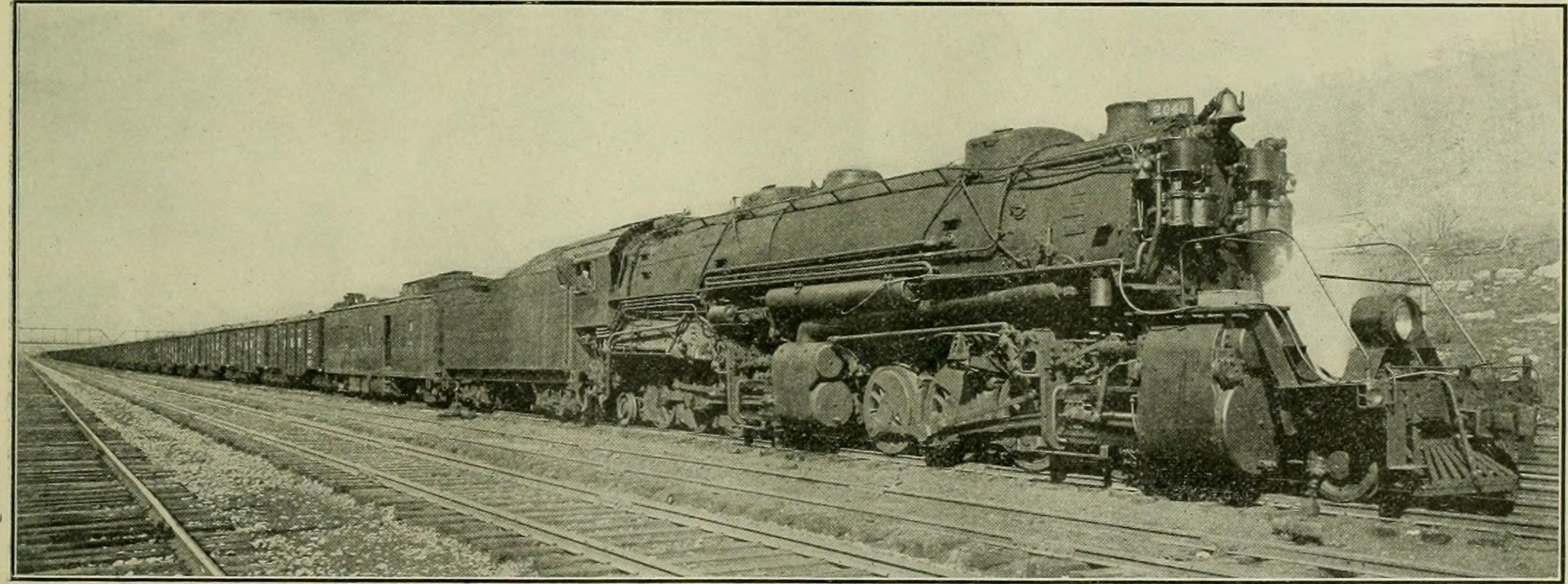
- Norfolk and Western Y3 No. 2040 pulling a coal train at a Bluefield, West Virginia yard in April 1921
Type and origin
- Power type: Steam
- Builder: American Locomotive Company, Baldwin Locomotive Works
- Build date: 1919-1923
Specifications
- Configuration
  - Whyte: 2-8-8-2
  - UIC: (1′D)D1′ hv4
- Gauge: 4 ft 8 1/2 in (1,435 mm)
- Leading dia.: 30 in (760 mm)
- Driver dia.: 57 in (1,400 mm)
- Trailing dia.: 30 in (760 mm)
- Tender wheels: 33 in (840 mm)
- Wheelbase: 67 ft 4 in (20.52 m)
  - incl. tender: 93 ft 3 in (28.42 m)
- Length: 113 ft 3 in (34.52 m)
- Width: 11 ft 3 in (3.43 m)
- Height: 15 ft 8 5/8 in (4.79 m)
- Adhesive weight: 478,000 lb (217,000 kg)
- Loco weight: 531,000 lb (241,000 kg)
- Tender weight: 209,100 lb (94,800 kg)
- Total weight: 740,100 lb (335,700 kg)
- Fuel type: Coal
- Fuel capacity: 30 t (30 long tons; 33 short tons)
- Water cap.: 22,000 US gal (83,000 L; 18,000 imp gal)
- Firebox
  - Grate area: 96 sq ft (8.9 m^{2})
- Boiler
  - Type: Straight Top
  - Diameter: 98 in (2,500 mm)
  - Small tubes: 2 1/4 in (57 mm)
  - Large tubes: 5 1/2 in (140 mm)
- Boiler pressure: 270 psi (1.862 MPa)
- Heating surface
  - Firebox: 435 sq ft (40.4 m^{2})
  - Tubes: 3,860 sq ft (359 m^{2})
  - Flues: 1,825 sq ft (169.5 m^{2})
  - Total surface: 6,120 sq ft (569 m^{2})
- Superheater
  - Heating area: 145 sq ft (13.5 m^{2})
- Cylinders: Four: two low-pressure (front), two high-pressure (rear)
- High-pressure cylinder: 25 in × 32 in (640 mm × 810 mm)
- Low-pressure cylinder: 39 in × 32 in (990 mm × 810 mm)
- Valve gear: Baker
- Valve type: Piston
- Loco brake: 6ET
Performance figures
- Tractive effort: (Simple: 136,985 lbf (609.3 kN)) (Compound: 114,154 lbf (507.8 kN))
Career
- Operators: Norfolk and Western Railway; Virginian Railway; Pennsylvania Railroad; Santa Fe Railroad; Union Pacific Railroad
- Class: Y3; Y3a; VGN USE; PRR HH1
- Number in class: 80
- Numbers: N&W 2000-2079; VGN 736-742; PRR 373-378; Santa Fe 1790-1797; UP 3670-3674
- Retired: 1956-1959
- Disposition: One Y3a preserved, remainder scrapped

The Norfolk and Western classes Y3 and Y3a were classes of 2-8-8-2 "Mallet" articulated steam locomotives, with a total of 80 locomotives built for the Norfolk and Western Railway between 1919 and 1923.

== History ==
=== Development ===
In March 1918, the Norfolk and Western Railway (N&W), which had been experimenting with Mallet locomotives to satisfy their growing mainline coal traffic over the Blue Ridge Mountains, introduced Y2 class 2-8-8-2 No. 1700, which was constructed at the Railway's shops in Roanoke, Virginia. When No. 1700 was placed into service, it was quickly deemed a success, being able to produce 135,600 lbf (603.18 kN) of tractive effort with simple expansion, and 104,300 lbf (463.95 kN) with compound expansion, but the locomotive's flawed boiler and firebox design prevented it from producing enough required steam.

During this time, the United States Railroad Administration (USRA), which was created to control and standardize North American railroads during World War I, assigned the N&W, the Virginian Railway, and the Chesapeake and Ohio Railway (C&O) to their Pocahontas Region, with N&W president Nicholas D. Mahler serving as the regional manager. The USRA’s mechanical engineering committee, which included two staff members from the N&W's engineering team, used the N&W's Y2 prototype as the basis for the USRA's standard 2-8-8-2 design, with the boiler and firebox problems being solved.

=== Construction and design ===
The USRA 2-8-8-2s were designed with 25-by-32-inch (640 mm × 810 mm) high-pressure cylinders, 36-by-32-inch (910 mm × 810 mm) low-pressure cylinders, 57-inch (1,400 mm) diameter driving wheels, and a working boiler pressure of 240 psi (1.7 MPa), and they were able to generate a tractive effort of 106,000 lbf (471.51 kN) with compound expansion. A Mellin-type by-pass and intercepting control valve was used to transition the locomotive between simple and compound operations. Other features the USRA design came with included the Type A Schmidt Superheater, the N&W-style short frame Baker valve gear, and smokebox-mounted air pumps.

Their tenders originally carried 16 short tons (32,000 lb) of coal and 12,000 US gallons (45,000 L) of water. The N&W received forty-five locomotives (Nos. 2000-2044) of the USRA design in February, April, and May of 1919 from the American Locomotive Company's (ALCO) Schenectady Works, and the railway classified them as Y3s. (Note: The first USRA 2-8-8-2’s were originally planned to be assigned to the Virginian Railway, but for unknown reasons, they were quickly delivered to the N&W, instead.) Five more Y3s (Nos. 2045-2049) were delivered from the Baldwin Locomotive Works in August and September that same year. While the N&W was also allowed to continue ordering 1700 series Y2 class locomotives, the N&W was satisfied with the Y3's superior performance, since they were able to travel with more reliable counterbalancing.

Between March and June of 1923, three years the N&W was released from USRA control, the N&W decided to order thirty copies of the USRA 2-8-8-2s from ALCO's Richmond, Virginia Works, and they were classified as Y3as (Nos. 2050-2079). Towards the end of the 1920s, the N&W began rebuilding and modifying all of their Y3s and Y3as; their air pumps were moved to the right side of the boiler; they were equipped with a Worthington BL feedwater heater on the left side; and their boiler pressure was raised to 270 psi (1.9 MPa), resulting in their tractive effort being boosted to 136,985 lbf (609.34 kN) with simple expansion and 114,154 lbf (507.78 kN) with compound expansion. Their tenders were replaced with larger ones that carried 30 short tons (60,000 lb) of coal and 22,000 US gallons (83,000 L) of water.

=== Revenue service and retirement ===
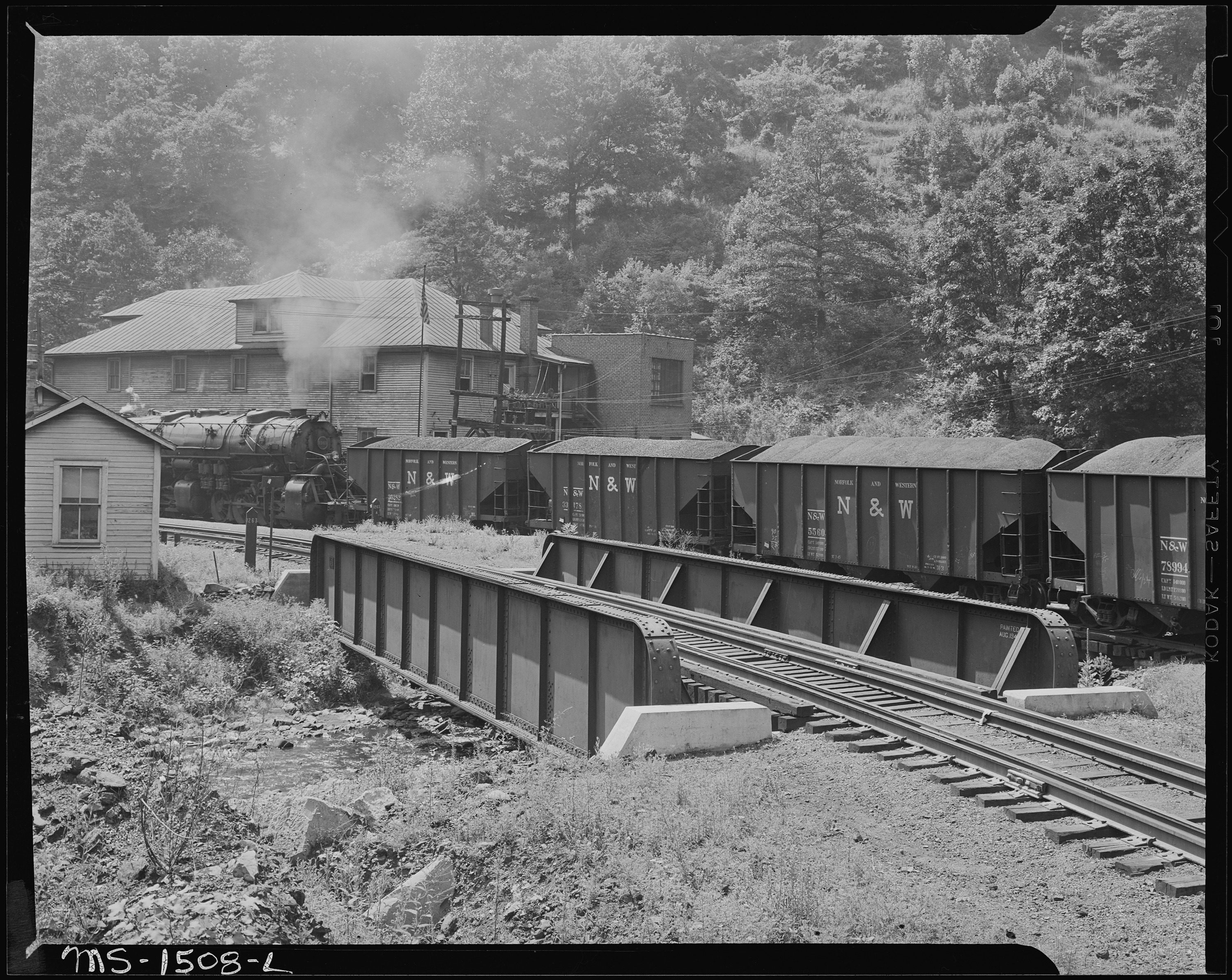
N&W Y3a No. 2063 pulling a coal train tender-first in Gilliam, West Virginia

When the Y3s were first placed into service in 1919, they were assigned alongside the Y2s in pulling the N&W's heavy coal trains over their steep grades. Throughout the 1920s and 1930s, the Y3s and Y3as were assigned in general freight service on all the N&W's mainlines and branch lines. Some Y3s were also used alongside the Y2s as switchers at their coal classification yards, such as the East Portsmouth, Ohio yard. One Y3, No. 2006, was modified with a booster called a "Bethlehem Auxiliary Locomotive", which consisted of two powered trucks beneath the tender, and it increased the locomotive's tractive effort by 34,500 lbf (153.46 kN), allowing for more efficient switching maneuvers.

Towards their final years in service, the Y3s replaced the Z1 class 2-6-6-2's in pulling 10,000-short-ton (9,100 t; 8,900-long-ton) coal trains from Crewe to Roanoke. In June 1956, No. 2003 became the first Y3 to be retired from the N&W and sold for scrap, and within the next two years, the rest of the Y3s were also withdrawn from service, as the N&W began to dieselize their roster. Most of the Y3as followed suit in 1958 and 1959.

== Usage on other railroads ==
During World War II, the N&W sold several of their surplus steam locomotives, including seventeen Y2s, nineteen Y3s, and all the K3 class 4-8-2s, to other railroads in need of extra motive power to help assist the wartime shipments. In particular, six Y3s were sold in May 1943 to the Pennsylvania Railroad (PRR), which held a 30% share in N&W's stock at the time. The PRR reclassified their Y3s as HH1s, renumbered them as Nos. 373-378, and assigned them to operate out of their mainline terminal in Enola, Pennsylvania and on their Harrisburg—Hagerstown branch.

Throughout 1943, eight other Y3s were sold to the Atchison, Topeka and Santa Fe Railroad, where they were renumbered as Nos. 1790-1797. The Santa Fe assigned the eight 2-8-8-2s to operate on Raton Pass, where they helped push heavy freight trains up the Raton grade, and they sometimes assisted 4-8-4s in pulling longer passenger consists. The railroad quickly became ambivalent to Nos. 1790-1797's performances; while they were able to assist longer trains at Raton Pass, the locomotives' slow speeds made them incompatible with the Santa Fe's fast-moving operations.

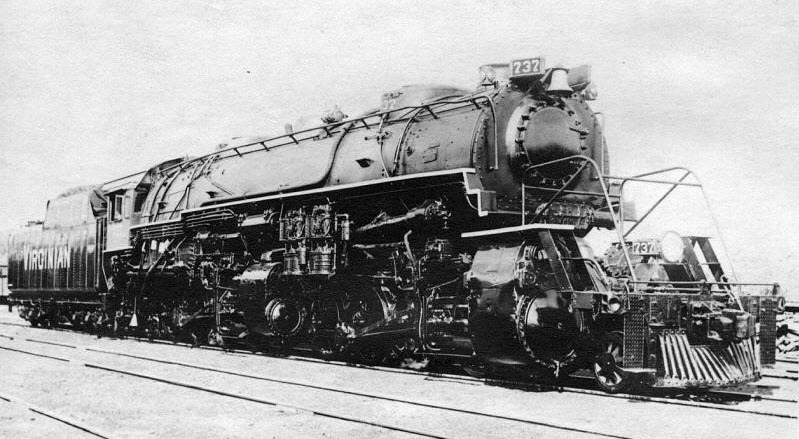
Virginian Railway class USE No. 737, which was originally built as Norfolk and Western 2015 and previously operated as Santa Fe 1792

In December 1947, the Santa Fe sold Nos. 1790-1796 to the Virginian Railway, where they were renumbered again as Nos. 736-742, reclassified as USEs, and rebuilt at their Princeton, West Virginia shops. The Virginian purchased the former Y3s to replace their aging 2-10-10-2s, and the USEs were assigned to pull the railway's heavy coal trains over the Clark's Gap ruling grade. When the Virginian acquired diesel locomotives from Fairbanks-Morse in 1954, all of the USEs were retired from the roster.

In June 1945, the N&W sold five more Y3s to the Union Pacific Railroad (UP), where they were renumbered as Nos. 3670-3674. The UP assigned their five 2-8-8-2s to operate around Green River and Rock Springs, Wyoming, and while they were shown to be successful in stop gap purposes, they were quickly deemed surplus, since the UP's 4-6-6-4 "Challengers" and 4-8-8-4 "Big Boys" were more powerful and reliable. Nos. 3670-3674 were all scrapped in 1948.

== Preservation ==
Only one of the Y3as, No. 2050, has been preserved. In 1958 and 1959, several Y3as were sold for scrap to the Armco Steel Corporation in Middletown, Ohio, but No. 2050 was one of three such locomotives that Armco chose at random to be used as stationary boilers. The other two Y3as were eventually scrapped, but No. 2050 remained in outdoor storage until 1975, when it was donated to the Illinois Railway Museum (IRM), and the following year, it was moved to the museum's property in Union, Illinois for static display.

== N&W classes Y3b/Y4 and Y4a/Y5 ==
In January 1927, the N&W received ten more copies (Nos. 2080-2089) of the USRA 2-8-8-2s from ALCO's Richmond Works. The ten mallets, along with some Southern Railway Ps-4 class 4-6-2s, were the very last locomotives to be built at the Richmond plant before ALCO shut it down, and they were the very last steam locomotives the N&W ordered from an outside manufacturer; every future steam locomotive the railway ordered would be built at their Roanoke shops. Nos. 2080-2089 were classified as Y3bs, since they were heavier at 567,000 pounds (257,000 kg) and came with some different design features from the Y3s and Y3as; their air compressors were always mounted on the left side of the boiler; they were built with Worthington BL feedwater heaters; and their tenders held different capacities—23 short tons (46,000 lb) of coal and 16,000 US gallons (61,000 L) of water.

In October 1927, the Y3bs were all reclassified as Y4s, and in later years, they received some modifications to improve their performances; their boiler pressure was boosted from 240 psi (1.7 MPa) to 270 psi (1.9 MPa); their driving wheel diameter was increased from 57 inches (1,400 mm) to 58 inches (1,500 mm); and they received larger tenders that carried 26 short tons (52,000 lb) of coal and 18,000 US gallons (68,000 L) of water. In 1953, the Y4s' tender capacity was further boosted to 27 short tons (54,000 lb) of coal and 24,000 US gallons (91,000 L) of water, when the locomotives received eight-axle tenders formerly paired with Atlantic Coast Line R-1 class 4-8-4s. The Y4 locomotives were assigned in general freight and mine switching service alongside the older Y3s, but in 1958, all of them were retired and scrapped.

In the 1930s, the N&W's mechanical engineering team explored ways to refine the Y series 2-8-8-2 compound Mallets, since demand for coal was increasing despite the effects of the Great Depression. In 1930 and 1931, the N&W built Y5s (Nos. 2090–2109) at the East End Shops in Roanoke, Virginia. The Y5s were based on the railroad's class Y4 locomotives, which were copies of the United States Railroad Administration's (USRA) 2-8-8-2 design, but the Y5s were improved to the point they were considered exclusive N&W designs.

== Accidents and incidents ==
=== N&W class Y3 ===
- On June 5, 1920, N&W 2008 suffered a backdraft caused by a crown sheet failure due to low water at Roanoke, Virginia. It would be sold to the Pennsylvania Railroad (PRR) on May 26, 1943, becoming PRR HH-1 374.
- On February 9, 1934, N&W 2012's coupling failed causing the locomotive to break free from its train while operating at Salem, Virginia.
- On May 20, 1934, N&W 2012 derailed at Nace, Virginia due to poor track condition.
- On June 6, 1936, N&W 2004 suffered a reversing wheel failure at Vulcan, West Virginia.
- On August 27, 1937, N&W 2012 suffered a reverse gear failure at Roanoke, Virginia.
- On November 9, 1937, N&W 2005's main rod broke at Kermit, West Virginia.

=== N&W class Y3a ===
- On December 5, 1930, N&W 2050 suffered a brake line failure at Borderland, West Virginia that caused it to be pulled from service, until it was repaired.
- On February 21, 1933, N&W 2065 failed to operate due to a break in the flexible air line between the high and low pressure cylinders at Waverly, Ohio.
- On December 21, 1935, N&W 2072's throttle-stem packing had blew out, causing a high-pressure steam leak on the locomotive.
- On April 2, 1937, N&W 2055 suffered a brake pipe failure at Waverly, Ohio.
- On October 23, 1941, N&W 2050 suffered a feedwater pump throttle valve failure at Lynchburg, Virginia.
- On February 22, 1946, N&W 2076 collided with another train at Barren Springs, Virginia.
- In May 1951, N&W 2052 collided head-on at West Virginia.

=== N&W class Y3b/Y4 ===
- On January 8, 1936, N&W 2088 suffered a reversing wheel failure at East Radford, Virginia.
- On March 21, 1937, N&W 2086 sideswiped a train that was hauled by LC-1 2505 at Flat Top, West Virginia.

=== N&W class Y4a/Y5 ===
- On February 2, 1931, N&W 2099 collides with a work train at Alnwick, West Virginia.
- On August 10, 1932, N&W 2102 derailed at Wharncliffe, West Virginia.
- On June 1, 1933, N&W 2108 was involved in a sideswipe incident with Z-1b #1448 at Roanoke, Virginia.
- On November 8, 1935, N&W 2091 suffered a reversing wheel failure at Charlestown, West Virginia.
- On March 19, 1937, N&W 2090 suffered a reversing wheel failure at Roanoke, Virginia.
- On June 30, 1937, N&W 2092 derailed on the Maybeury Trestle bridge, falling 86 feet (1,030 in; 26 m) onto the ground and exploding its boiler, killing three people aboard it. The locomotive was scrapped after the wreck.
- On November 17, 1943, N&W 2110 suffered a failure due to a throttle hard at Eckman, West Virginia.
- On September 5, 1945, N&W 2106 suffered an air compressor failure at Carlos, West Virginia.
- On August 23, 1950, N&W 2114 suffered a boiler explosion at Winchester, Ohio. The locomotive was rebuilt in November 1951 with a new boiler.
- On June 29, 1952, N&W 2104 derailed on curve near Cliffield, Virginia.

== See also ==
- Norfolk and Western 2156
- Norfolk and Western Class A
- USRA 2-6-6-2
- 2-6-6-6

== Bibliography ==
- Dixon, Thomas W. Jr.; Parker, Karen; Huddleston, Gene (2009). Norfolk & Western's Y-Class Articulated Steam Locomotives. TLC Publishing.
- Drury, George H. (1993). Guide to North American Steam Locomotives. Waukesha, Wisconsin: Kalmbach Publishing Company. ISBN 0-89024-206-2. LCCN 93041472.
- Harris, Nelson (2003). Norfolk and Western Railway. Arcadia. ISBN 9780738515274.
- Huddleston, Eugene L. (2002). Uncle Sam's Locomotives - The USRA and the Nation's Railroads. Indiana University Press. ISBN 9780253340863.
- King, Ed (1998). Norfolk & Western in the Appalachians: From the Blue Ridge to the Big Sandy. The Golden Year of Railroading (1st ed.). Kalmbach Publishing. ISBN 0-89024-316-6.
- Young, Jan (2013). Great Railroad Museums of the USA. Lulu.com. ISBN 9781300755555.
