= Antoine Sauter =

French-born American machinist (1848–1905)

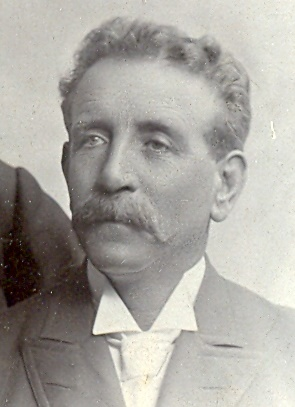
- Born: May 4, 1848; Oberhergheim, France
- Died: April 16, 1905 (aged 56); Philadelphia, Pennsylvania, US
- Occupation: Machinist
- Employer: Roanoke Machine Works
- Known for: Foreman, master mechanic
- Spouse: Catherine Senn
- Children: 8

Antoine "Anthony" "Andy" Sauter (May 4, 1848 – April 16, 1905) was a machinist, once foreman of various shops in the Roanoke Machine Works for the Norfolk and Western Railroad. He was a general foreman for the shops at Lambert's Point from 1895 to 1903.

== Early years ==
Antoine Sauter was born on May 4, 1848, to Henri Sauter and Marie Anne Sick (or Sieg) in Oberhergheim, near Colmar in Alsace, France. His father Henri was a mason from Dotternhausen, Germany. Antoine attended the public and private schools, and worked as a locksmith for the Koechlin machine shops in Mulhouse from 1863 to 1867.

On April 21, 1870, he married Catherine Senn in Mulhouse. Sauter was still working as a locksmith.

== United States ==
Following the Franco-Prussian War, the Sauters left for America, arriving in Jersey City on April 1, 1872. He worked in Jersey City for the Erie Railways Company until its shops were consumed by fire on July 24, (Note: Responding fireman James McCarthy was the first Jersey City firefighter to be killed in the line of duty.) and then he moved to Susquehanna, Pennsylvania to work for the same company.

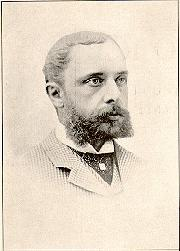
Sauter worked under Frederick J. Kimball (pictured).

He arrived in Roanoke on July 4, 1882, staying for 13 years a foreman for the machine shops of the Roanoke Machine Works, part of the Norfolk and Western Railroad under president Frederick J. Kimball.

Sauter received a promotion to "master mechanic" and moved to Lambert's Point near Norfolk. He was serenaded at his home by the Roanoke Machine Works Band shortly before the move, on December 1, 1895.

Sauter spent a short time with his son as foreman in Portsmouth, Ohio before he was taken ill. He died of endocarditis in Philadelphia, Pennsylvania at the German Hospital on April 16, 1905.
