= Oberhergheim =

Commune in Grand Est, France

- Commune
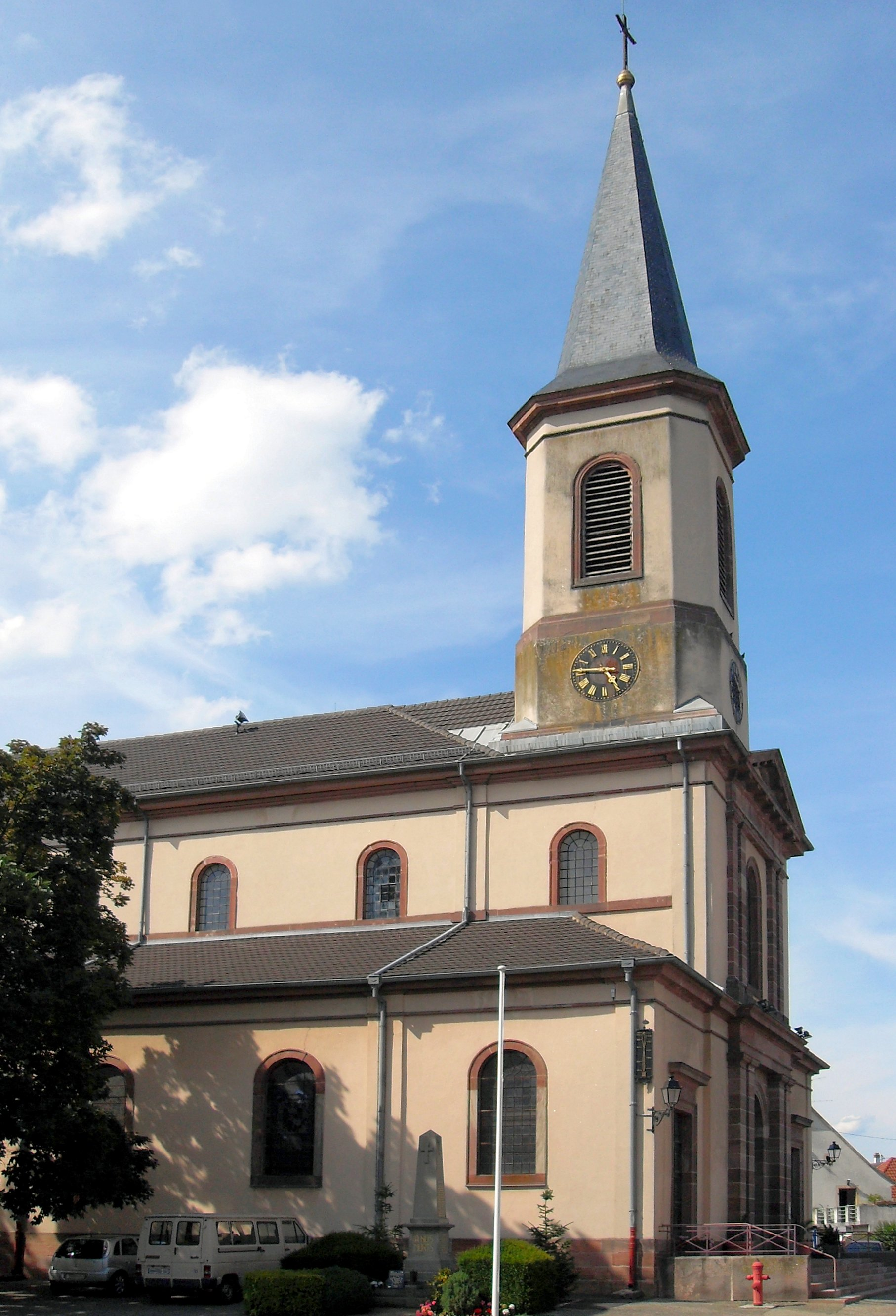
- The church in Oberhergheim

- Coat of arms
- Location of Oberhergheim
- Location within France Location within Grand Est
- Coordinates: 47°58′02″N 7°23′46″E
- Country: France
- Region: Grand Est
- Department: Haut-Rhin
- Arrondissement: Thann-Guebwiller
- Canton: Ensisheim
- Intercommunality: Centre Haut-Rhin

Government
  - Mayor (2020–2026): Corinne Sick
- Area^{1}: 19.86 km^{2} (7.67 sq mi)
- Elevation: 202 m (663 ft)
- Highest elevation: 207 m (679 ft)
- Lowest elevation: 197 m (646 ft)
- Population (2023): 1,315
  - Density: 66.21/km^{2} (171.5/sq mi)
- Time zone: UTC+01:00 (CET)
  - Summer (DST): UTC+02:00 (CEST)
- INSEE/Postal code: 68242 /68127
- ^{1} French Land Register data, which excludes lakes, ponds, glaciers > 1 km^{2} (0.386 sq mi or 247 acres) and river estuaries.

Oberhergheim is a commune in the Haut-Rhin department in Grand Est in north-eastern France.

== Population ==
Historical population
| Year | Pop. | ±% p.a. |
|---|---|---|
| 1968 | 894 | — |
| 1975 | 903 | +0.14% |
| 1982 | 957 | +0.83% |
| 1990 | 1,071 | +1.42% |
| 1999 | 1,102 | +0.32% |
| 2007 | 1,185 | +0.91% |
| 2012 | 1,200 | +0.25% |
| 2017 | 1,202 | +0.03% |
| 2023 | 1,315 | +1.51% |
Source: INSEE

== Notable people ==
- Martin Drolling
- Antoine Sauter

== See also ==
- Communes of the Haut-Rhin department
