= Norfolk and Western 2050 =

Preserved N&W class Y3a 2-8-8-2 steam locomotive

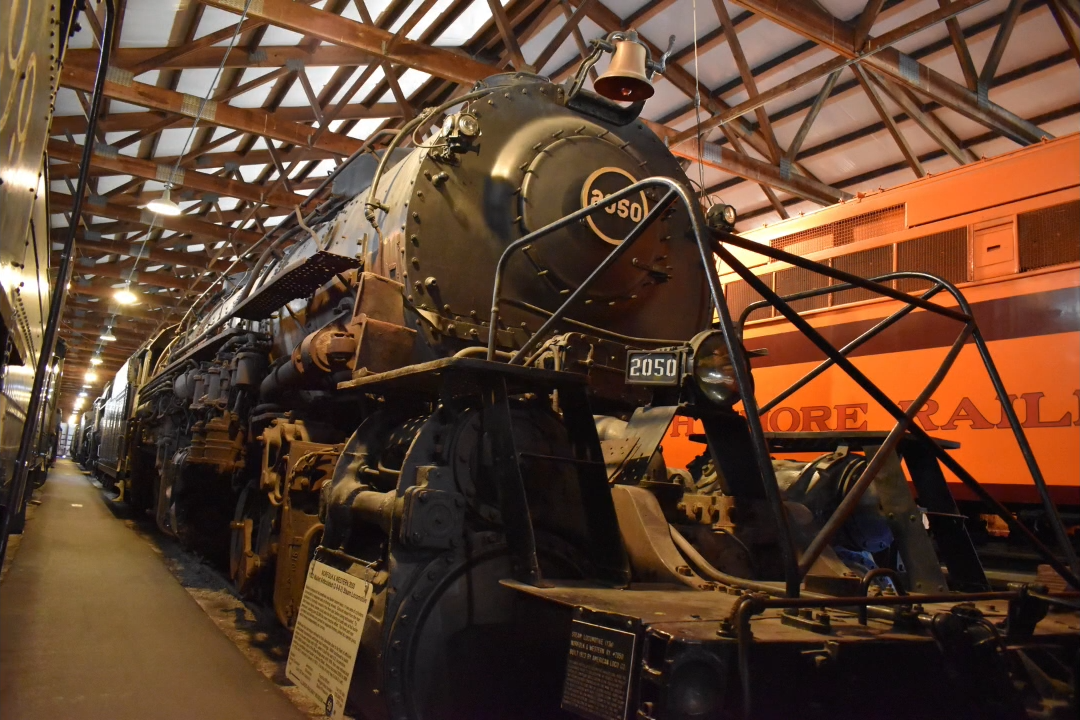
- No. 2050 on static display at the Illinois Railway Museum on November 4, 2022
Type and origin
- Power type: Steam
- Builder: American Locomotive Company (Richmond Works)
- Serial number: 64070
- Build date: March 1923
Specifications
- Configuration
  - Whyte: 2-8-8-2
  - UIC: (1′D)D1′ hv4
- Gauge: 4 ft 8 1/2 in (1,435 mm)
- Leading dia.: 30 in (760 mm)
- Driver dia.: 57 in (1,400 mm)
- Trailing dia.: 30 in (760 mm)
- Tender wheels: 33 in (840 mm)
- Wheelbase: 67 ft 4 in (20.52 m)
  - incl. tender: 93 ft 3 in (28.42 m)
- Length: 113 ft 3 in (34.52 m)
- Width: 11 ft 3 in (3.43 m)
- Height: 15 ft 8 5/8 in (4.79 m)
- Adhesive weight: 478,000 lb (217,000 kg)
- Loco weight: 531,000 lb (241,000 kg)
- Tender weight: 209,100 lb (94,800 kg)
- Total weight: 740,100 lb (335,700 kg)
- Fuel type: Coal
- Fuel capacity: 30 t (29.5 long tons; 33.1 short tons)
- Water cap.: 22,000 US gal (83,000 L; 18,000 imp gal)
- Firebox
  - Grate area: 96 sq ft (8.9 m^{2})
- Boiler
  - Type: Straight Top
  - Diameter: 98 in (2,500 mm)
  - Small tubes: 2 1/4 in (57 mm)
  - Large tubes: 5 1/2 in (140 mm)
- Boiler pressure: 270 psi (1.862 MPa)
- Heating surface
  - Firebox: 435 sq ft (40.4 m^{2})
  - Tubes: 3,860 sq ft (359 m^{2})
  - Flues: 1,825 sq ft (169.5 m^{2})
  - Total surface: 6,120 sq ft (569 m^{2})
- Superheater
  - Heating area: 145 sq ft (13.5 m^{2})
- Cylinders: Four: two low-pressure (front), two high-pressure (rear)
- High-pressure cylinder: 25 in × 32 in (640 mm × 810 mm)
- Low-pressure cylinder: 39 in × 32 in (990 mm × 810 mm)
- Valve gear: Baker
- Valve type: Piston valves
- Loco brake: 6ET
- Train brakes: Air
- Couplers: Knuckle
Performance figures
- Tractive effort: (Simple: 136,985 lbf (609.3 kN)) (Compound: 114,154 lbf (507.8 kN))
Career
- Operators: Norfolk and Western Railway
- Class: Y3a
- Number in class: 1st of 30
- Numbers: N&W 2050
- Retired: December 1, 1958
- Preserved: 1975
- Current owner: Illinois Railway Museum
- Disposition: On static display

Norfolk and Western 2050 is a class Y3a 2-8-8-2 Compound Mallet steam locomotive, built in March 1923 by the American Locomotive Company's (ALCO) Richmond, Virginia Works for the Norfolk and Western Railway (N&W). The locomotive primarily helped haul the N&W's freight and coal trains, but by the end of the 1950s, it was relegated as a hump yard switcher.

Retired from service in 1959, No. 2050 was sold for scrap to the Armco Steel Corporation of Middletown, Ohio, but it was withheld as a stationary boiler. Following some conversations and sentimentality between Armco employees and Illinois Railway Museum (IRM) members, the locomotive was donated to the IRM in 1975, and it was moved to their property in Union, Illinois the following year. As of 2026, No. 2050 is on static display at the IRM.

== History ==
=== Construction and design ===
Throughout 1919, the Norfolk and Western Railway (N&W), which was in need of larger steam locomotives to handle their rising coal traffic over the Blue Ridge Mountains, received fifty United States Railroad Administration (USRA) 2-8-8-2 compound "Mallets" from the American Locomotive Company (ALCO) and the Baldwin Locomotive Works, and the railway classified them as Y3s (Nos. 2000-2049). The USRA 2-8-8-2s were based on the N&W's prototype Y2 class 2-8-8-2 No. 1700, but with some alterations being made to improve its performance.

They were built with 57-inch (1,400 mm) diameter driving wheels, 25-by-32-inch (640 mm × 810 mm) high-pressure cylinders, 36-by-32-inch (910 mm × 810 mm) low-pressure cylinders, and an operating boiler pressure of 240 psi (1.7 MPa), and they were capable of producing 106,000 lbf (471.51 kN) of tractive effort with compound expansion. They were also equipped with a Mellin type by-pass and intercepting valve to change its operations between Simple and Compound. Their tenders originally carried 16 short tons (32,000 lb) of coal and 12,000 US gallons (45,000 L) of water.

The N&W was so satisfied with the Y3s performances that throughout 1923, the company ordered thirty identical copies of the USRA 2-8-8-2s from ALCO's Richmond, Virginia works, and they were classified as Y3as (Nos. 2050-2079). Beginning in the late 1920s, the N&W rebuilt and modified their Y3s and Y3as; their boiler pressure was boosted to 270 psi (1.9 MPa), which in turn boosted their tractive effort to 136,985 lbf (609.34 kN) with simple expansion and 114,154 lbf (507.78 kN) with compound expansion. Their tenders were upgraded to hold 30 short tons (60,000 lb) of coal and 22,000 US gallons (83,000 L) of water.

=== Revenue service and retirement ===
No. 2050 was the first locomotive of the Y3a class, being built as part of the first batch of ten locomotives in March 1923. No. 2050 quickly joined the older Y3 locomotives in service, being used to pull heavy drag-speed coal trains over steep grades in the Blue Ridge Mountains. By the early 1950s, No. 2050 was reassigned to pull local freight trains in the N&W's Radford Division in and out of Roanoke, Virginia.

Towards the end of the decade, No. 2050 was reassigned again as a hump switcher in Williamson, West Virginia, and then it was transferred to Portsmouth, Ohio, where the locomotive spent its final days of revenue service before it was retired on December 1, 1958. Simultaneously, all of the other Y3as and Y3s were also being removed from service, as the N&W dieselized their roster.

=== Armco Steel and Illinois Railway Museum ownership ===
By the end of 1958, No. 2050 was among several Mallet locomotives the N&W sold for scrap to the Armco Steel Corporation in Middletown, Ohio. While most of the other N&W mallets were cut up, No. 2050 was one of three such locomotives that Armco chose at random to be used as portable stationary boilers around their plant. They were equipped with a 6-inch (15 cm) line on their steam dome, but they were only used as stationary boilers twice before they were left in outdoor storage.

Sometime in the mid-1960s, the other two remaining mallets were scrapped, while No. 2050 was retained as an emergency back-up boiler, but it was never used as such again. As time progressed, some Armco employees had become fond of the No. 2050 locomotive; one of them chalked a poem on the side of its tender, which subsequently became featured in Trains magazine.

My engine now is cold and still.
No water does my boiler fill.
My coal affords its flame no more.
My days of usefulness are o’er.
My wheels denied their wanted speed.
No more thy guiding hand they need.
My whistle too has lost its tone.
Its shrill and thrilling sounds are gone.
My valves are now thrown open wide.
My flanges all refuse to guide.
My steam is now condensed, in death.

— The poem an anonymous Armco employee wrote on N&W No. 2050's tender,

In 1973, the Illinois Railway Museum (IRM) of Union, Illinois became aware of No. 2050's deteriorating status and solicited for it to be donated to them, but Armco—believing the museum wanted to receive the locomotive in good mechanical condition—asked the IRM to pay $37,500, consequently ending the negotiations. Two other museums, including the Roanoke Transportation Museum, also tried to obtain No. 2050 as a donation, but to no avail. In the spring of 1975, one Armco employee, Neil Easter, visited the IRM along with his wife and sons while returning home from a vacation, and upon learning the IRM's interest in No. 2050 from IRM member J. David Conrad, Neil promised to help arrange a donation.

Neil Easter informed Armco management that the IRM was able to perform some required mechanical work on No. 2050 and paying for the shipping costs themselves, and Armco agreed to donate the locomotive to the museum. In September 1975, the IRM authorized a team of mechanics—led by Dave Conrad—to repair No. 2050 to ensure the locomotive would be safely shipped on its wheels, but work did not begin until January 1976, when the IRM formally contracted with Armco to remove the Y3a from their property. No. 2050 was found to be in poor condition, and the crews had to thoroughly clean and lubricate the axles to make the locomotive roll, with Penn Central (PC) having to inspect it twice for eligibility to be moved on their mainline.

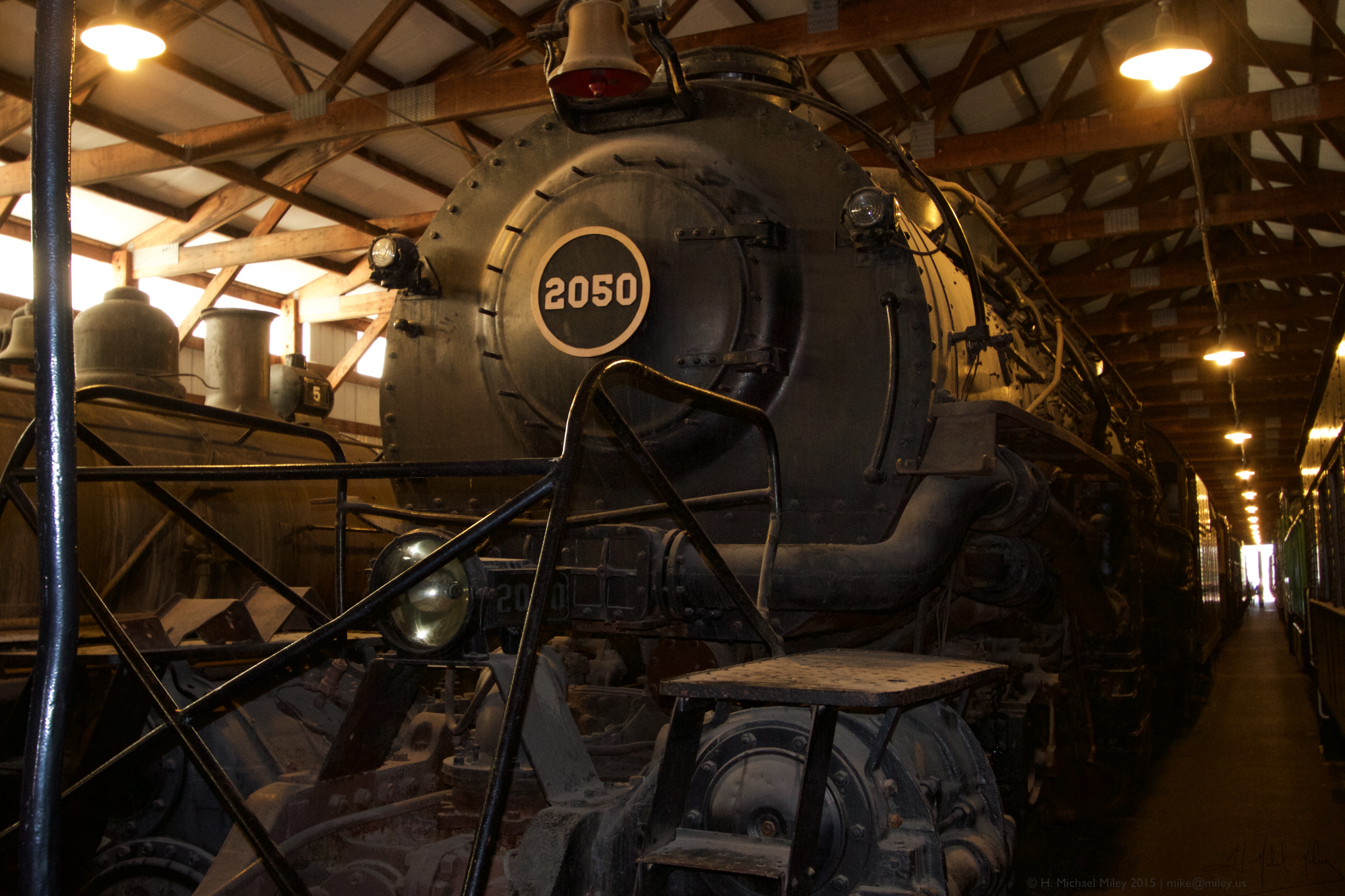
No. 2050 on static display at the Illinois Railway Museum on September 19, 2015

Per request of PC, several additional tasks were made to ready No. 2050; old coal was unloaded from the tender; the tender brake cylinder and the footboards were replaced with duplicates; the locked brake rigging was oiled and loosened; and part of the locomotive was jacked up to repair a broken driving wheel spring. On April 19, No. 2050 was towed out of the Armco property and towed in a special consist via Conrail—PC's successor. Upon arrival in Chicago, No. 2050 was transferred to a Chicago and North Western (C&NW) fast freight consist, which towed it to the IRM interchange, and then two of the museum's diesels towed it onto one of the IRM's sidings. Following its arrival at the IRM, No. 2050 underwent a cosmetic restoration led by Jim Kehrein.

As of 2026, No. 2050 resides inside one of the buildings at the IRM.

== Accidents and incidents ==
- On December 5, 1930, No. 2050 suffered a brake line failure at Borderland, West Virginia that caused it to be pulled from service, until it was repaired.
- On October 23, 1941, No. 2050 suffered another failure, this time with its feedwater pump throttle valve at Lynchburg, Virginia.

== See also ==
- Chesapeake and Ohio 1308
- Norfolk and Western 1218
- Norfolk and Western 2156
- Western Maryland Scenic Railroad 1309

== Bibliography ==
- Young, Jan (2013). Great Railroad Museums of the USA. Lulu.com. ISBN 9781300755555.
- Huddleston, Eugene L. (2002). Uncle Sam's Locomotives - The USRA and the Nation's Railroads. Indiana University Press. ISBN 9780253340863.
- Dixon, Thomas W. Jr.; Parker, Karen; Huddleston, Gene (2009). Norfolk & Western's Y-Class Articulated Steam Locomotives. TLC Publishing.
