= USRA 2-8-8-2 =

Steam locomotive class

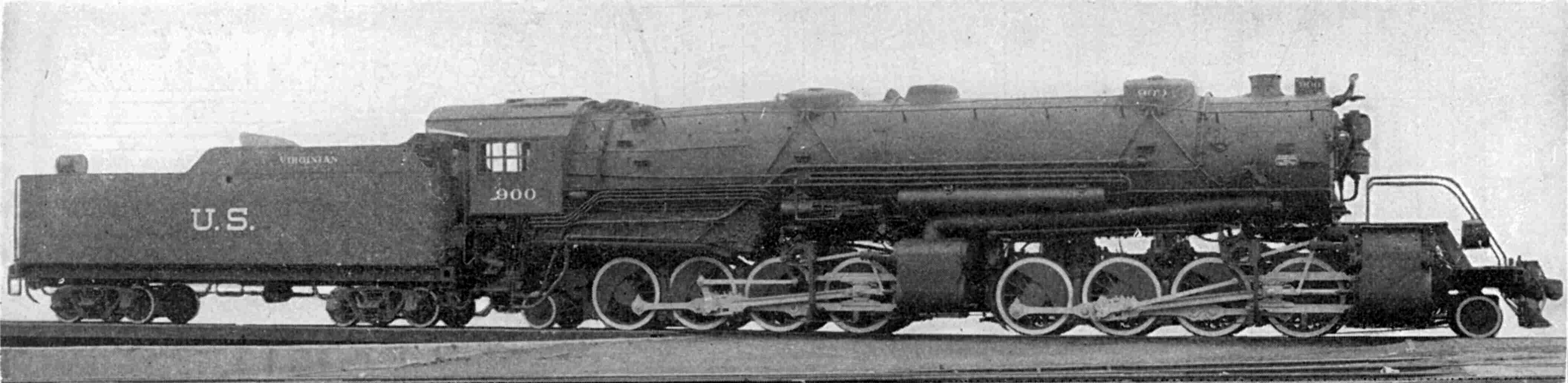
- Virginian No. 900, prior to its refusal by the Virginian Railway. It (and VGN Nos. 901–904) became Norfolk and Western Y3 class locomotives Nos. 2000–2004.
Type and origin
- Power type: Steam
- Builder: ALCO, Baldwin
- Total produced: 80 originals, (plus 81 copies)
Specifications
- Configuration
  - Whyte: 2-8-8-2
  - UIC: (1′D)D1′ h4v
- Gauge: 4 ft 8 1/2 in (1,435 mm)
- Driver dia.: 57 in (1,448 mm)
- Adhesive weight: 474,000 lb (215.0 t)
- Loco weight: 531,000 lb (240.9 t)
- Fuel type: Coal
- Boiler pressure: 240 lbf/in^{2} (1.65 MPa)
- Cylinders: Four, two LP (front), two HP (rear)
- High-pressure cylinder: 23 in × 32 in (584 mm × 813 mm)
- Low-pressure cylinder: 39 in × 32 in (991 mm × 813 mm)
- Valve gear: Baker
- Loco brake: Air
- Train brakes: Air
Performance figures
- Tractive effort: 101,300 lbf (450.6 kN)
Career
- Disposition: One copy (N&W 2050) preserved, remainder scrapped

The USRA 2-8-8-2 was a USRA standard class of steam locomotive designed under the control of the United States Railroad Administration, the nationalized railroad system in the United States during World War I. These locomotives were of 2-8-8-2 wheel arrangement in the Whyte notation, or (1'D)'D1' in UIC classification. A total of 106 locomotives were built to this plan for the USRA; postwar, it became a de facto standard design.

== History ==
While the 2-8-8-2 had been built in the United States since 1909, most development work had gone into making subsequent locomotives larger and heavier. The Norfolk and Western Railway however, had taken development in a different direction. By using smaller cylinders and higher boiler pressure, the result was a locomotive capable of powerful performance, and a turn of speed higher than the 20 mph (32 km/h) maximum of the ‘traditional’ designs.

The USRA 2-8-8-2 drew heavily on the Norfolk and Western Railway’s Y2 class locomotive design, as their delegate to the 2-8-8-2 design committee had brought a full set of blueprints.

== Original owners ==
=== USRA originals ===
Railroad	Quantity	Class	Road numbers	Notes
Clinchfield Railroad	10	L-2	725–734	
Norfolk and Western Railway	45	Y3	2005–2049	
Virginian Railway	5	—	900–904	Refused, to Norfolk and Western 2000–2004
Virginian Railway	20	USA	701–720	
Total	80			

=== Copies ===
Railroad	Quantity	Class	Road numbers	Notes
Clinchfield Railroad	10	L-3	735–744	
Denver and Rio Grande Western Railroad	10	L-107	3500–3509	
Interstate Railway	2	Class 20	20-21	
Norfolk and Western Railway	30	Y3a	2050–2079	
Norfolk and Western Railway	10	Y3b	2080–2089	Later reclassified as Y-4’s
Northern Pacific Railway	4	Z-4	4500–4503	
Virginian Railway	15	USB	721–735	
Total	81			

== Preservation ==
While none of the original USRA 2-8-8-2’s are preserved, one of the copies is. Norfolk and Western 2050, a 1923 ALCO product of N&W's Y3a class, is on static display at the Illinois Railway Museum in Union, Illinois.
