= Roanoke Shops =

Railway workshops in Roanoke, Virginia

Coordinates: 37.27405°N 79.93202°W

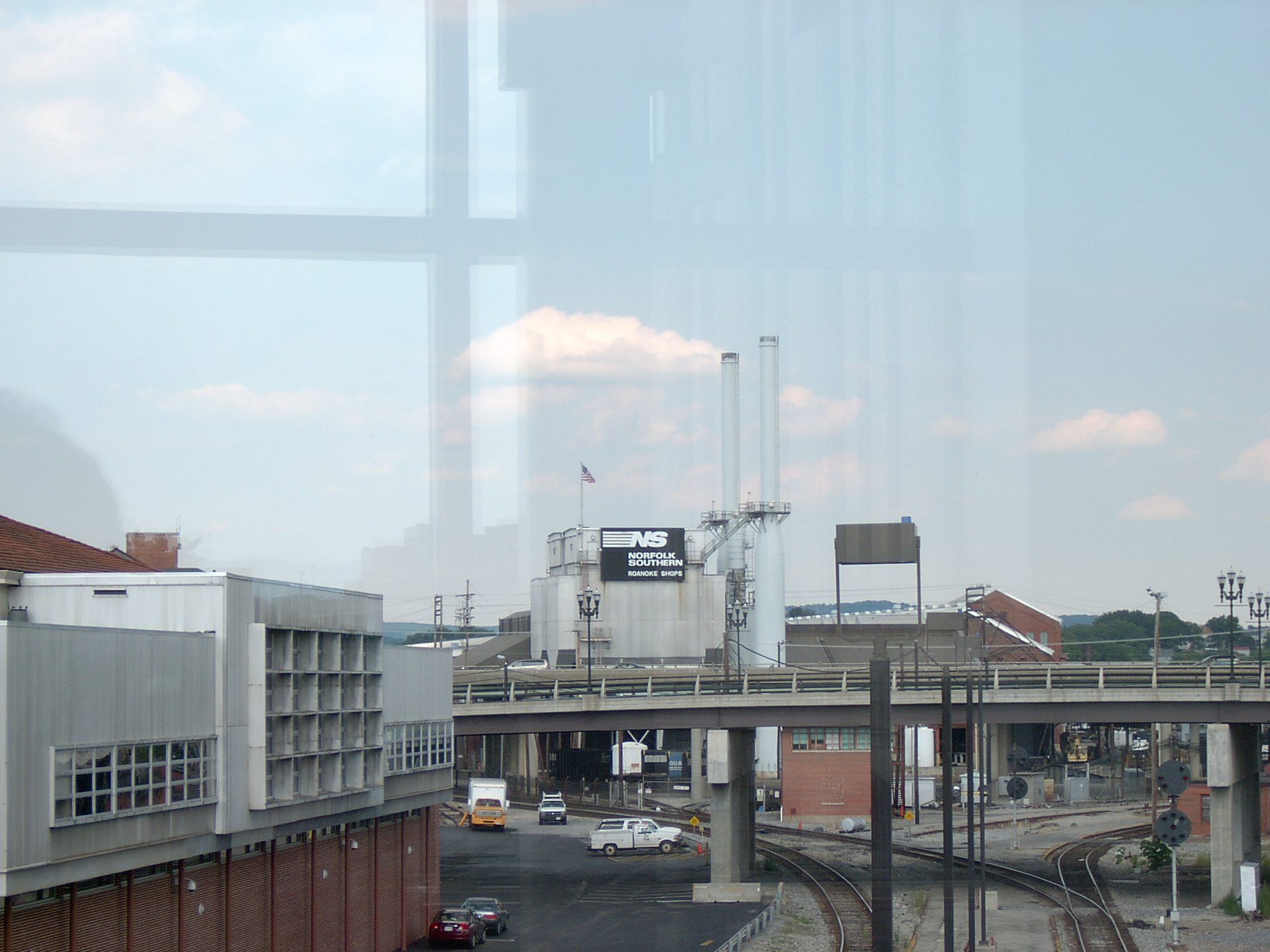
The Roanoke (East End) Shops in 2004

The Roanoke Shops (comprising the main East End Shops and the West Roanoke Yard and shops at Shaffers Crossing) is a railroad workshop and maintenance facility in Roanoke, Virginia. Between 1884 and 1953, the shops produced 447 steam locomotives, all for the Norfolk and Western Railway (N&W). The Roanoke Shops built the N&W's famous Big Three class steam locomotives; the 4-8-4 class J, the 2-6-6-4 class A, and the 2-8-8-2 class Y6. In late 1953, the Shops built their final steam locomotive, making it last standard gauge steam locomotive built for revenue service in the United States. In 2020, N&W's successor, Norfolk Southern, abandoned the Shops and Genesis Rail Services leased the property in July 2023.

== History ==
Before the locomotive shops were being built, Roanoke had been a quiet farming community called Big Lick and a small stop on the Atlantic, Mississippi & Ohio Railroad (AM&O). That changed in February 1881 when the owners of the Shenandoah Valley Railroad, building up the valley, purchased the AM&O, renamed it the Norfolk and Western, and selected Big Lick as the new junction. In 1882, the town grew rapidly as the new center of the combined railroads and changed its name to Roanoke, becoming a city in just a short time.

In October 1881, the Roanoke Machine Works was founded, a set of shops that would grow to massive size and become the major employer in the Roanoke Valley for a century. The shops came under the control of the N&W in 1883, and the following year the shops began building locomotives. Over the next nine years, the facility built 152 locomotives, all for the N&W, then suspended production. Antoine Sauter was one of its foremen.

Production resumed in 1900 at the facility, which had been renamed the Roanoke Shops in 1897. Over the next 53 years, the shops built 295 locomotives (and re-boilered two more). From 1927 to 1952, the shops built every steam locomotive acquired by the N&W.

During the 1930s, they employed over 6,000 workers, who were working on four steam locomotives and 20 freight cars on any given day. Products included locomotives of all sizes and of increasingly better technology, from switching engines to the famed streamlined class J passenger locomotives, the huge, articulated Y5 and Y6-classes for low-speed coal drags, and the A-class for fast freight service.

During World War II in the 1940s, the Roanoke Shops repaired more than 100 locomotives from the Atlantic Coast Line (ACL), Chicago and North Western (C&NW), Richmond, Fredericksburg and Potomac (RF&P), and Seaboard Air Line (SAL) railroads to assist with the war effort. Additionally, they manufactured components for Bailey bridges, marine cylinders, and other critical parts for war use.

In December 1953, the Roanoke Shops built the class S-1a 0-8-0 switcher No. 244, which was also the last steam locomotive manufactured in the United States for domestic use.

After the N&W stopped using steam locomotives in May 1960, J-class No. 611 and A-class No. 1218 were used to pull excursion trains from the early 1980s until the early 1990s. No. 1218 is now on display near its birthplace in a specially constructed pavilion at the Virginia Museum of Transportation in downtown Roanoke. No. 611 has been restored to operating condition for excursion service again in 2015. On May 18, 2020, Norfolk Southern abandoned the Roanoke Shops and moved all operations to the Juniata Locomotive Shops in Altoona, Pennsylvania. In July 2023, Genesis Rail Services leased a portion of the Roanoke Shops.

== Bibliography ==
- King, Ed (1998). Norfolk & Western in the Appalachians: From the Blue Ridge to the Big Sandy. The Golden Year of Railroading (1st ed.). Kalmbach Publishing. ISBN 0-89024-316-6.
- McKinney, Wayne (2014). Roanoke Locomotive Shops and the Norfolk & Western Railroad. Images of Rails (1st ed.). Arcadia Publishing. ISBN 978-1-4671-2111-8.
- Starr, Timothy (2024). The Back Shop Illustrated, Volume 3: Southeast and Western Regions. Privately printed.
