= 2-8-8-2 =

Articulated locomotive wheel arrangement

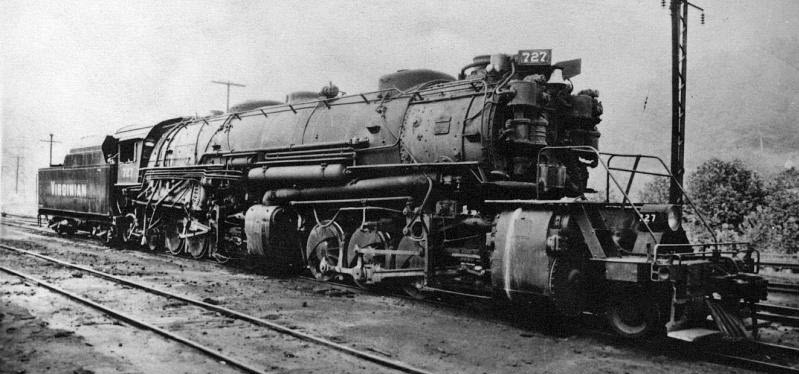
Virginian Railway USB class 2-8-8-2 No. 727

A 2-8-8-2, in the Whyte notation for describing steam locomotive wheel arrangements, is an articulated locomotive with a two-wheel leading truck, two sets of eight driving wheels, and a two-wheel trailing truck. The equivalent UIC classification is, refined to Mallet locomotives, (1′D)D1′ 4v. These locomotives usually employ the Mallet principles of articulation—with the rear engine rigidly attached to the boiler and the front engine free to rotate—and compounding. The 2-8-8-2 was a design largely limited to American locomotive builders. The last 2-8-8-2 was retired in 1962 from the N&W's roster, two years past the ending of steam though steam was still used on steel mill lines and other railroads until 1983.

Other equivalent classifications are:

UIC classification: (1′D)D1′
French classification: 140+041
Turkish classification: 45+45
Swiss classification: 4/5+4/5

A similar wheel arrangemement exists for Garratt locomotives, but is referred to as 2-8-0+0-8-2 since both engine units swivel.

The first 2-8-8-2 was built in 1909 by Baldwin, who sold two to the Southern Pacific Railroad (classified MC-1), and then three each to the Union Pacific Railroad and UP-owned Oregon Railroad and Navigation Company. Baldwin conceived the type as an expansion of the 2-6-6-2 permitting a greater tractive effort.

The next order for the type was from the Southern Pacific; these differed in being cab forward locomotives, so that the crew could have better visibility and breathing in the SP's long tunnels and snow sheds. They were very successful, and SP continued to order cab-forward locomotives, building an eventual fleet of 256 of numerous classes; later cab-forwards were 4-6-6-2s (originally 2-6-6-2s) and 4-8-8-2s.

The 2-8-8-2 proved itself to be a capable hauler on mountain grades, enabling the replacement of several smaller locomotives and hauling longer trains than before. Most of them were not fast; they hauled at drag freight speeds, up to 25 mph (40 km/h). However, the Norfolk and Western Y6 class were designed to run up to 55 mph (89 km/h). The locomotives were adopted by a broad spectrum of mountain railroads, including the Norfolk & Western, Southern, Virginian, Great Northern, Clinchfield, Denver & Rio Grande Western, Reading, Western Maryland, Missouri Pacific, Frisco, and the Duluth, Missabe and Iron Range Railway. On many railroads, the locomotives of the type were the most powerful on the roster. When built, the 2-8-8-2s of the Western Pacific Railroad were among the most powerful steam locomotives in the world and formed the basis for the later 2-8-8-4 "Yellowstone" type engines used by the Duluth, Missabe and Iron Range.

The last compound Mallet locomotives to operate on major railroads in the United States were the 2-8-8-2 Y6b class of the Norfolk and Western Railway. After their final modifications in the 1950s, they were said to be capable of 170,000 lbs tractive effort in simple-expansion mode, although some have questioned this claim (the original design tractive effort was 152,206 lbs SIMPLE and 126,838 lbs COMPOUND). The last were retired in May 1960.

As of 2008, there are two surviving 2-8-8-2 locomotives, both former Norfolk & Western. N&W 2050 is from the railroad's Y3a class; Alco's Richmond works built it in 1923 and it is displayed at the Illinois Railway Museum in Union, Illinois. N&W 2156, the most powerful extant steam locomotive in the world (in terms of tractive effort), is from the railroad's Y6a class; N&W's own Roanoke Shops built it in 1942 and it is owned by the National Museum of Transportation in St. Louis, Missouri. The 2156 was displayed at the Virginia Museum of Transportation in Roanoke, Virginia from 2015 to 2020, after which it returned to the Museum of Transportation in St. Louis.
