= List of Chesapeake and Ohio locomotives =

Locomotives operated by the Chesapeake and Ohio Railway.

== Steam locomotives ==
=== Class B: 2-10-2 ===
Class B was used for the 2-10-2 Santa Fe types.

- Chesapeake and Ohio class B-1 ex-Hocking Valley Railway (and formerly Lehigh Valley Railroad) 2-10-2s
- Chesapeake and Ohio class B-2
- Chesapeake and Ohio class B-3
- Chesapeake and Ohio Class B-4

=== Class C: 0-6-0 (C-1 to C-3, C-5 to C-7, C-11), 0-8-0 (C-4, C-8, C-13 to C-16), 0-10-0 (C-12), and Shays (C-9, C-10) ===
- Chesapeake and Ohio class C16 0-8-0

=== Class E: 2-6-0 (E-1 to E-6) ===
- Chesapeake and Ohio class E-5

=== Class F: 4-6-0 (F-1 to F-13) and 4-6-2 (F-14 to F-20) ===
- Chesapeake and Ohio class F-2 4-6-0
- Chesapeake and Ohio class F-10 4-6-0
- Chesapeake and Ohio class F-11 4-6-0
- Chesapeake and Ohio class F-12 4-6-2
- Chesapeake and Ohio class F-13 4-6-0
- Chesapeake and Ohio class F-14 4-6-2
- Chesapeake and Ohio class F-15 4-6-2
- Chesapeake and Ohio class F-16 4-6-2
- Chesapeake and Ohio classes F-17 and F-17-A 4-6-2
- Chesapeake and Ohio class F-18 4-6-2
- Chesapeake and Ohio class F-19 4-6-2

=== Class H: 2-6-6-2, 2-8-8-2, 2-6-6-6 ===
Class H was used for the 2-6-6-2, 2-8-8-2, and 2-6-6-6 Allegheny types

- Chesapeake and Ohio class H-1 2-6-6-2
- Chesapeake and Ohio class H-2 2-6-6-2
- Chesapeake and Ohio class H-3 ex-Hocking Valley Railway 2-6-6-2
- Chesapeake and Ohio class H-4 2-6-6-2
- Chesapeake and Ohio class H-5 2-6-6-2
- Chesapeake and Ohio class H-6 2-6-6-2
- Chesapeake and Ohio class H-7 and H-7-A 2-8-8-2
- Chesapeake and Ohio class H-8 2-6-6-6

=== Class J: 4-8-2 and 4-8-4 ===
Class J was used for 4-8-2 Mountain and 4-8-4 Greenbrier types

- Chesapeake and Ohio class J-1 4-8-2
- Chesapeake and Ohio class J-2 4-8-2
- Chesapeake and Ohio classes J-3, J-3-A, and J-3-B 4-8-4

=== Class K: 2-8-2 and 2-8-4 ===
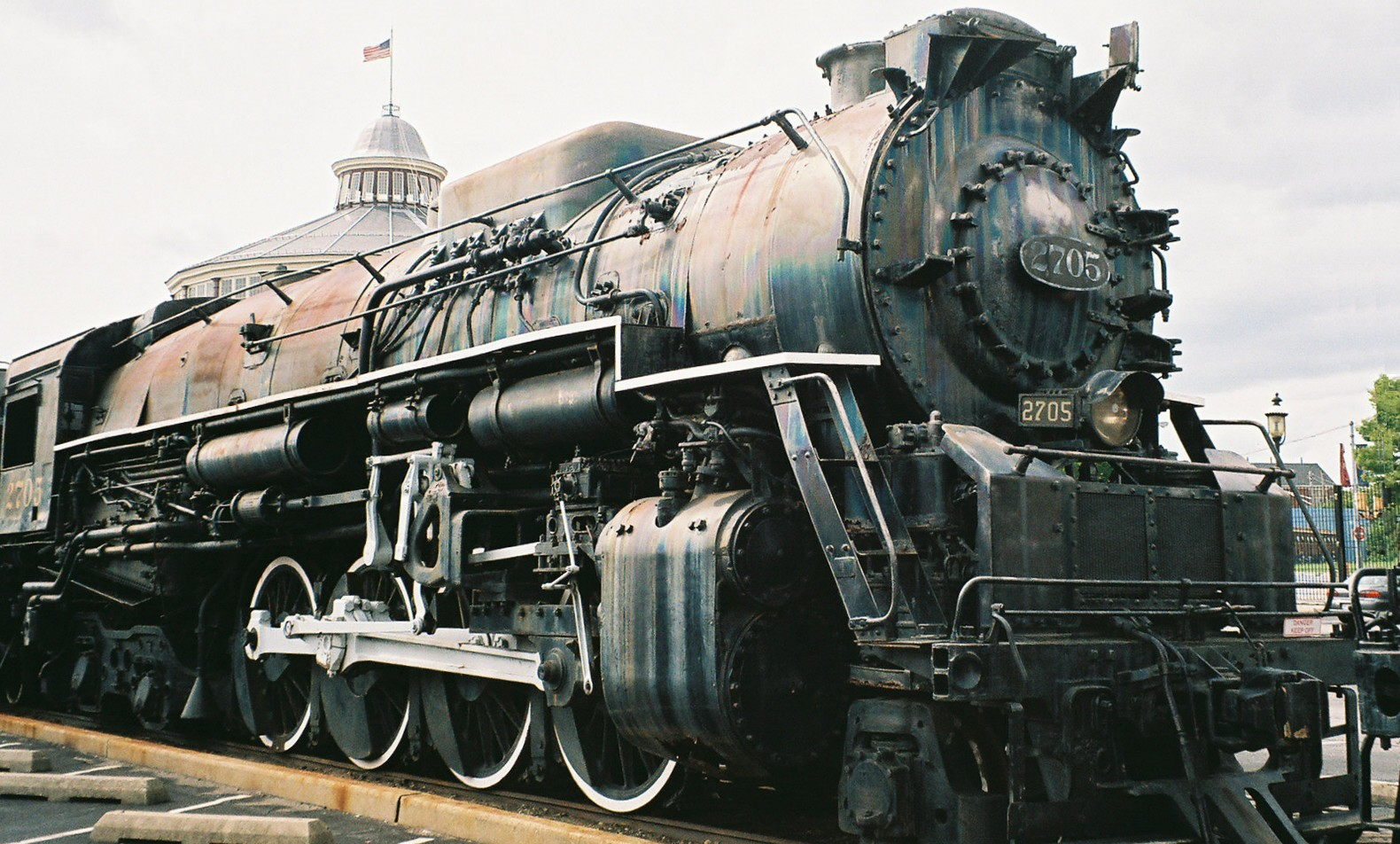
C&O's "Big Mike" #2705, a 2-8-4 Class K-4 "Kanawha" built by Alco in 1943, at the B&O Railroad Museum in 2008

Class K was used for 2-8-2 Mikado and 2-8-4 Kanawha types

- Chesapeake and Ohio class K ex-Hocking Valley Railway 2-8-2
- Chesapeake and Ohio class K-1 2-8-2
- Chesapeake and Ohio class K-2 2-8-2
- Chesapeake and Ohio classes K-3 and K-3-A 2-8-2
- Chesapeake and Ohio class K-4 2-8-4
- Chesapeake and Ohio class K-5 ex-Pere Marquette Railway 2-8-2
- Chesapeake and Ohio class K-6 ex-Pere Marquette Railway 2-8-2
- Chesapeake and Ohio class K-8 ex-Pere Marquette Railway 2-8-2

=== Class L: 4-6-4 ===
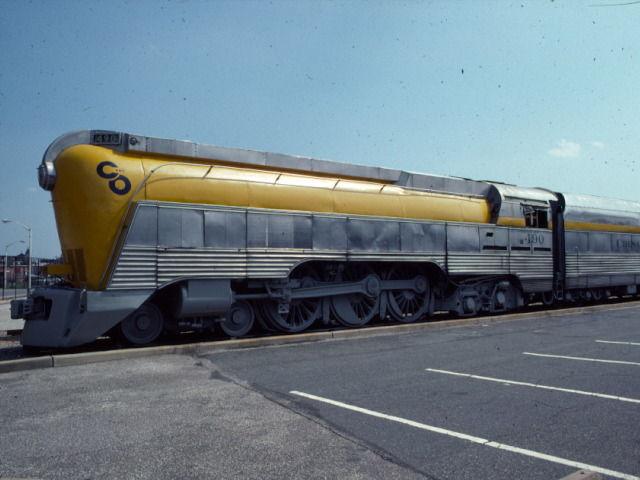
C&O L-1 class

Class L was used for 4-6-4 "Hudson" types.

- Chesapeake and Ohio class L-1
- Chesapeake and Ohio classes L-2 and L-2-A

=== Class M: Steam-Turbine-Electric ===
Class M was used for a single class of 2-C1+2-C1-2 Steam-turbine electric locomotives.

- Chesapeake and Ohio class M-1

=== Class N: 2-8-4 ===
- Chesapeake & Ohio class N-1 ex-Pere Marquette Railway 2-8-4
- Chesapeake & Ohio class N-2 ex-Pere Marquette Railway 2-8-4
- Chesapeake and Ohio class N-3 ex-Pere Marquette Railway 2-8-4

=== Class T: 2-10-4 ===
Class T was used for a single class of 2-10-4 "Texas" types

- Chesapeake and Ohio class T-1

== Diesel locomotives ==
=== ALCO ===
- S-2 58 engines built 1949–1950 5000-5057
- S-4 14 engines built 1953 5100-5113
- RS-2 2 engines built 1949 5500, 5501 sold to Lehigh Valley Railroad 1950
- RSD-5 26 engines built 1952 5570-5595
- RS-1 2 engines built 1953 5114, 5115
- RS-3 2 engines built 1955 5600, 5601
- RSD-12 10 engines built 1956 6700-6709
- RSD-7 12 engines built 1956 6800-6811, retired and traded to GE 1969
- C-630 4 engines built 1967 2100-2103, and later sold to Robe River Mining of Australia

=== Baldwin ===
- DRS-6-6-1500 3 engines built 1949 5530-5532
- AS-616 39 engines built 1950–1953 5528, 5529, 5533-5569

=== EMD ===
Switchers

- NW2 41 built for the C&O 5060-5079, 5200-5213, 1850-1856
- SW7 26 built for the C&O 5214-5239
- SW9 40 built for the C&O 5080-5093, 5240-5265
- TR3 Cow-Calf-Calf 2 sets built in 1949 6500, 6501
- TR4 Cow-Calf 2 sets built and operated together for use on the Dawkins Sub. out of Paintsville, KY. 6600, 6601

Passenger Cab units

- EA7 4 built for the C&O 95-98 (ordered by the Pere Marquette Railroad prior to merger)
- E8A 31 built for the C&O 4000-4030

Freight Cab units

- F7A 94 built for the C&O 7000-7093
- F7B 54 built for the C&O 7500-7546, 8500-8506
- FP7 16 built for the C&O 8000-8015

Road Switchers

Branch line (BL) 4 Axle

- BL2 14 built for the C&O 80-85, 1840-1847 (first 6 ordered by the Pere Marquette Railroad prior to merger)

General Purpose (GP) 4 Axle

- GP7 199 built for the C&O 5700-5797, 5800-5900
- GP9 363 Built for the C&O 5901-6263
- GP30 48 Built for the C&O 3000-3047
- GP35 58 Built for the C&O 3045, 3947, 3500-3539, 3560-3575
- GP38 50 Built for the C&O 3850-3899
- GP39 20 Built for the C&O 3900-3919
- GP40 50 Built for the C&O 3780-3794, 4065-4099

Special Duty (SD) 6 Axle

- SD18 19 Built for the C&O 1800-1818
- SD35 14 Built for the C&O 7420-7431, 7425, 7428
- SD40 63 Built for the C&O 7450-7469, 7475-7481, 7501-7536
- SD50 43 Built for the C&O

=== GE ===
Road Switcher 4 Axle

- U23B 30 Built for the C&O 2300-2329
- U25B 38 Built for the C&O 2500-2537
- U30B 35 Built for the C&O

8200-8234

Road Switcher 6 Axle

- U30C 13 Built for the C&O 3300-3312

Dash 7

- B30-7 30 Built for the C&O
