= Norfolk and Western 1240 =

N&W class A locomotive

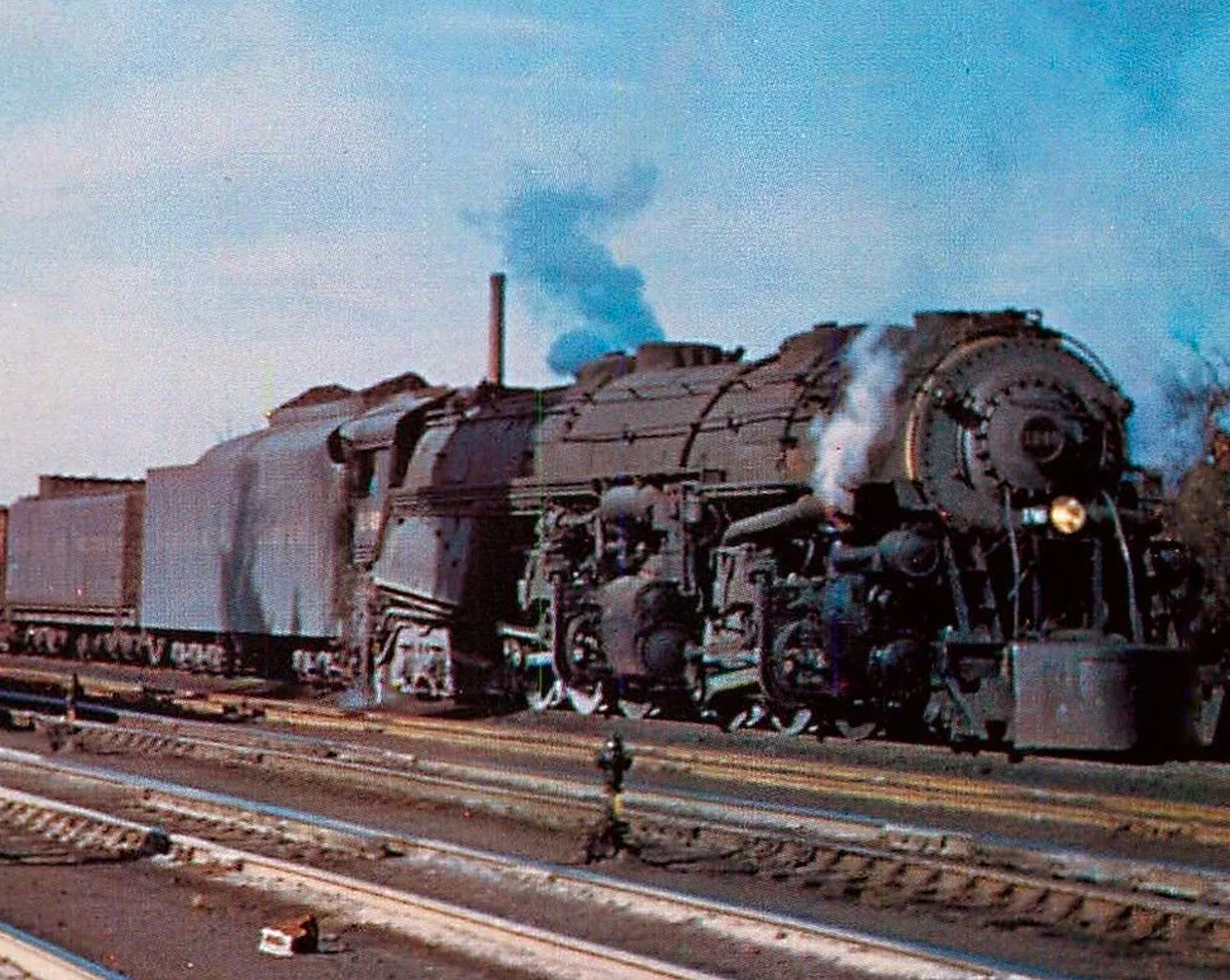
- Norfolk and Western No. 1240 at Norfolk, Virginia c. 1956.
Type and origin
- Power type: Steam
- Builder: N&W's Roanoke Shops (East End Shops)
- Serial number: 385
- Build date: May 1950
Specifications
- Configuration
  - Whyte: 2-6-6-4
- Driver: 70 in (1,778 mm)
- Gauge: 1,435 mm (4 ft 8 1/2 in)
- Leading dia.: 33 in (838 mm)
- Driver dia.: 70 in (1.778 m)
- Trailing dia.: 42 in (1.067 m)
- Axle load: 72,000 lb (33 t)
- Adhesive weight: 432,350 lb (196.11 t)
- Loco weight: 573,000 lb (260 t)
- Tender weight: 378,600 lb (171.7 t)
- Total weight: 951,600 lb (431.6 t)
- Fuel type: Coal
- Fuel capacity: 30 short tons (60,000 lb)
- Water cap.: 22,000 US gal (83,000 L)
- Fuel consumption: 7 short tons (6.4 t) of coal per hour 13,906 US gallons (52,640 L) of water per hour
- Firebox
  - Grate area: 122 sq ft (11.3 m^{2})
- Boiler: 106 in (2,692 mm)
- Boiler pressure: 300 lbf/in^{2} (2.07 MPa)
- Heating surface
  - Firebox: 587 sq ft (54.5 m^{2})
  - Tubes and flues: 6,052 sq ft (562.2 m^{2})
- Superheater
  - Type: Type E
  - Heating area: 2,703 sq ft (251.1 m^{2})
- Cylinders: Four, simple articulated
- Cylinder size: 24 in × 30 in (610 mm × 760 mm)
- Valve gear: Baker
- Valve type: Piston valves
- Loco brake: Air
- Train brakes: Air
- Couplers: Knuckle
Performance figures
- Tractive effort: 114,000 lbf (507.10 kN)
- Factor of adh.: 3.8
Career
- Operators: Norfolk and Western Railway
- Class: A
- Numbers: N&W 1240
- Retired: August 26, 1959
- Scrapped: 1959
- Disposition: Scrapped

Norfolk and Western 1240 was a four-cylinder simple articulated 2-6-6-4 type steam locomotive, built in May 1950 by the Norfolk and Western's (N&W) East End Shops in Roanoke, Virginia as part of the N&W's class "A" fleet of fast freight locomotives.

== History ==
=== Construction and performances ===
Norfolk and Western (N&W) No. 1240 was manufactured in May 1950 by the Norfolk and Western Railway at their own Roanoke Shops. It was the third member of the final batch of five N&W class A 2-6-6-4 locomotives, Nos. 1238-1242, built with Timken roller bearings and lightweight reciprocating parts. These arrangements reduces roundhouse maintenance costs, reduction in hammer blow on the rails, and making the locomotives run longer without lubrication services.

=== Excursion run and scrapping ===
No. 1240 was retired from active service on the Norfolk and Western Railway on August 26, 1959, when they began replacing steam locomotives with diesel locomotives.

No. 1240 would be fired up again on July 11, 1959, and used on the N&W's Farewell to Steam excursion train along with class Y6b No. 2174. No. 1240 pulled the excursion from Roanoke, Virginia to Bluefield, West Virginia, where the train was transferred to No. 2174. The 2174 pulled it through the N&W's Pocahontas Division to Iaeger, and then it travelled over the Dry Fork Branch to Cedar Bluff. No. 2174 returned the excursion to Bluefield, and then No. 1240 returned the train to Roanoke, when the Farewell to Steam ended, No. 1240 was later sold for scrap as the N&W had no plans to preserve it or any of the A class at all. Ironically, N&W salvaged No. 1218 and sold it to the Union Carbide to be used as a stationary boiler in South Charleston, West Virginia, until it was preserved around 1964.

== See also ==
- Norfolk and Western 611
- Norfolk and Western 1218

== Bibliography ==
- Huddleston, Eugene L. (2001). World's Greatest Steam Locomotives: C&O 2-6-6-6, Virginian 2-6-6-6, N&W 2-6-6-4, UP 4-8-8-4 (1st ed.). TLC Publishing. ISBN 1-883089-60-3.
- Jeffries, Lewis (1980). N&W: Giant of Steam (1st ed.). Pruett Publishing. ISBN 0-87108-547-X.
- King, Ed (1989). The A: Norfolk & Western's Mercedes of Steam. Trans-Anglo Books. ISBN 978-0-87046-096-8.
- Solomon, Brian (2015). The Majesty of Big Steam. Voyageur Press. ISBN 978-0-7603-4892-5.
