= Norfolk and Western 2174 =

Scrapped N&W Y6b class 2-8-8-2 locomotive

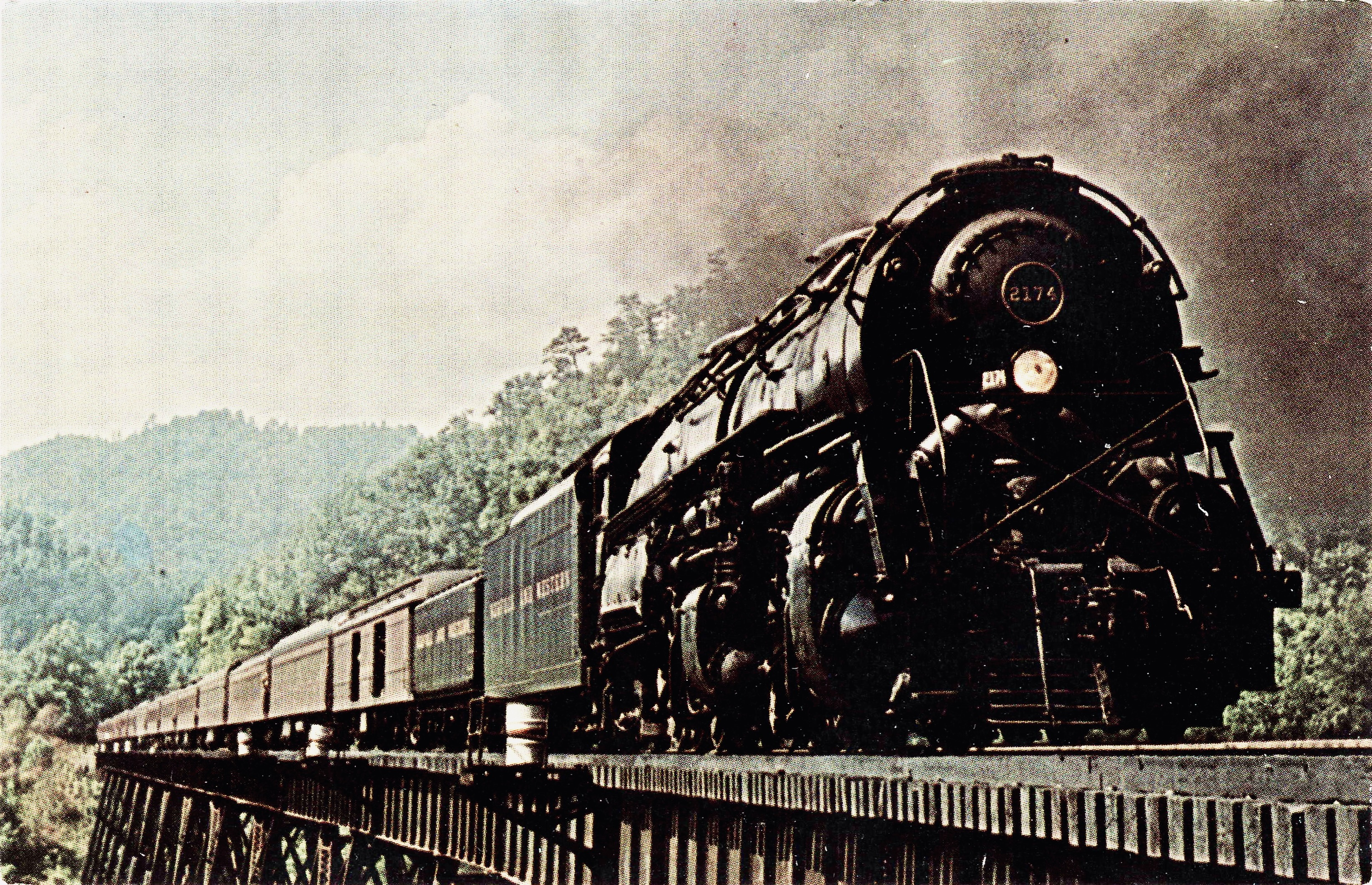
- N&W No. 2174 pulling a Farewell to Steam excursion on the N&W's Dry Fork Branch, on July 11, 1959
Type and origin
- Power type: Steam
- Builder: Roanoke Shops (East End Shops)
- Serial number: 366
- Build date: July 1948
Specifications
- Configuration
  - Whyte: 2-8-8-2
  - UIC: (1′D)D1′ hv4
- Gauge: 4 ft 8 1/2 in (1,435 mm)
- Leading dia.: 30 in (762 mm)
- Driver dia.: 58 in (1,473 mm)
- Trailing dia.: 30 in (762 mm)
- Tender wheels: 33 in (838 mm)
- Wheelbase: 103 ft 8 1/4 in (31.60 m)
  - Engine: 58 ft 0 in (17.68 m)
  - Drivers: 42 ft 4 in (12.90 m)
- Length
  - Over couplers: 114 ft 10 1/2 in (35.01 m)
- Height: 15 ft 8 9/16 in (4.79 m)
- Axle load
  - Leading: 34,640 lb (15.7 tonnes)
  - Trailing: 28,300 lb (12.8 tonnes)
- Adhesive weight: 548,500 lb (248.8 tonnes)
- Loco weight: 611,520 lb (277.4 tonnes)
- Total weight: 900,120 lb (408.3 tonnes)
- Fuel type: Coal
- Fuel capacity: 30 t (30 long tons; 33 short tons)
- Water cap.: 22,000 US gal (83,000 L; 18,000 imp gal)
- Firebox
  - Grate area: 106.2 sq ft (9.87 m^{2})
- Boiler
  - Model: Radial Stay
  - Diameter: 102 1/2 in (2,604 mm)
  - Small tubes: 2 1/4 in (57 mm)
  - Large tubes: 5 1/2 in (140 mm)
- Boiler pressure: 300 psi (2.07 MPa)
- Feedwater heater: Worthington SA
- Heating surface
  - Firebox: 371 sq ft (34.5 m^{2})
  - Arch tubes: 59 sq ft (5.5 m^{2})
  - Flues: 5,226 sq ft (485.5 m^{2})
  - Total surface: 7,431 sq ft (690.4 m^{2})
- Superheater
  - Type: Type A
  - Heating area: 1,478 sq ft (137.3 m^{2})
- Cylinders: Four: two low-pressure (front), two high-pressure (rear)
- High-pressure cylinder: 25 in × 32 in (635 mm × 813 mm)
- Low-pressure cylinder: 39 in × 32 in (991 mm × 813 mm)
- Valve gear: Baker
- Valve type: Piston valves
- Loco brake: Air
- Train brakes: Air
- Couplers: Knuckle
Performance figures
- Maximum speed: 50 mph (80 km/h)
- Power output: 5,600 hp (4,200 kW)
- Tractive effort: (Simple: 170,000 lbf (756.2 kN)) (Compound: 126,838 lbf (564.2 kN)) (as built 166,000 lbf (738.4 kN))
- Factor of adh.: 3.30
Career
- Operators: Norfolk and Western Railway
- Class: Y6b
- Number in class: 4 of 30
- Numbers: N&W 2174
- Retired: April 1960
- Scrapped: February 1976
- Disposition: Scrapped

Norfolk and Western 2174 was a Y6b class 2-8-8-2 compound Mallet steam locomotive, built by the Norfolk and Western Railway's (N&W) own Roanoke Shops, in 1948. No. 2174 and the other Y6bs were notably some of the most powerful steam locomotives ever built, being able to pull heavy freight and coal trains, unassisted. They were also some of the last steam locomotives ever built in the United States.

In July 1959, No. 2174 was chosen to haul an excursion train alongside N&W A class No. 1240. The following year, No. 2174 was retired from the N&W, and it was quickly sold to a scrap dealer, the United Iron & Metal Company, who stored the locomotive in their scrapyard for the next several years. In 1975, United Iron was bought out by a British corporation, and the following year, in 1976, No. 2174 was dismantled for scrap. Some local preservationists tried and failed to purchase the locomotive to preserve it.

== Construction and design ==
Throughout the 1920s and 1930s, the Norfolk and Western Railway (N&W) was looking into adding stronger steam locomotives to their roster, since the coal industry was booming, and they wanted to operate longer coal trains out of the Blue Ridge Mountains. The railway's mechanical engineering team was working to refine the company's Y series 2-8-8-2 compound mallets, despite the concept having been phased out on most other railroads. In 1930 and 1931, the N&W's East End Shops in Roanoke, Virginia, turned out their Y5 class locomotives (Nos. 2090–2109).

The Y5s were the N&W's most powerful locomotives at the time, being rated at 5,500 horsepower (4,100 kW), and they were able to produce a tractive effort of 152,200 lbf (677.02 kN) with simple expansion and 126,838 lbf (564.20 kN) with compound expansion. Between 1936 and 1940, locomotives of the Y6 class (Nos. 2120–2154) were built, and they shared identical specifications to the Y5s, but they were built with newer features for improved efficiency. In 1942, the Y6a locomotives (Nos. 2155–2170) were built, and they were classified as such, since certain materials were altered for the World War II effort.

After World War II ended, the N&W decided to construct a bypass grade in their Bluefield Division, to discontinue their electrified section there. The end of their electrification, along with the post-war growth for the coal industry, encouraged the N&W to add more mallets to their roster, and the Railway's mechanical engineering team made multiple upgrades to the existing Y6 design. The newly-developed locomotive, the Y6b class (Nos. 2171-2200), were more powerful than the Y5s and Y6s were, with their tractive effort being rated at 166,000 lbf (738.40 kN) with simple expansion.

Their boilers were also longer in length; the size of their combustion chamber in their firebox was increased from 42 inches (1,100 mm) to 84 inches (2,100 mm); and the upper portion of their smokebox was extended forward to accommodate a Worthington SA feedwater heater. The latter modification resulted in Nos. 2171-2194 initially being built with small "oblong" smokebox doors, but due to limited access for crews, they were later replaced with conventional round doors.

Other modifications made for the Y6bs included roller bearings for all of the tender axles, a larger diameter smokestack, and a manual reducing valve to switch the mallet between simple and compound operations at any speed. The Y6bs still retained some features that were previously applied to their predecessors, including a boiler pressure of 300 psi (2.07 MPa), 58-inch (1,500 mm) diameter driving wheels, and tenders that held 30 short tons (60,000 lb) of coal and 20,000 US gallons (76,000 L) of water. The final Y6b, No. 2200, was completed in April 1952; three years after Baldwin Locomotive Works built the final domestic steam locomotive in the United States.

Also in 1952, Y6b No. 2197 was built with a booster valve that allowed superheated high-pressure steam into the low-pressure cylinders, resulting in its tractive effort being boosted to 170,000 lbf (756.20 kN). 13 short tons (26,000 lb) had to be added to its front chassis frame to prevent wheel slippage, and all of the other Y6bs were subsequently rebuilt with these upgrades.

== History ==
=== Revenue service and excursion run ===
No. 2174 was the fourth Y6b, having rolled out of the East End Shops, in July 1948. All of the Y6bs were assigned alongside the Y5, Y6, and Y6a locomotives to all-purpose duties across the N&W system; they hauled drag-speed coal trains; they hauled manifest freight trains; they helped push heavy trains up steep grades; and they served as mine-shifters in coal fields. The way a Y6b was maintained was akin to the way diesel locomotives were maintained, since their design had been improved to the point that an average maintenance stops during a run lasted 90 minutes.

In 1955, after realizing the economic challenges of keeping and operating an all-steam locomotive fleet, the N&W decided to begin purchasing diesels, with some RS-11s and GP9s being ordered from ALCO and EMD, respectively. In 1958, new president Stuart T. Saunders began prioritizing a complete dieselization of the railway. The following year, the N&W began to retire their Y6bs.

On July 11, 1959, No. 2174 was tasked to haul an 18-car Farewell to Steam excursion on the N&W mainline alongside 2-6-6-4 A class No. 1240. No. 1240 hauled the excursion from Roanoke, Virginia to Bluefield, West Virginia, where the train was transferred to No. 2174. The Y6b hauled it through the N&W's Pocahontas Division to Iaeger, and then it traveled over the Dry Fork Branch to Cedar Bluff. No. 2174 returned the excursion to Bluefield, and then No. 1240 returned the train to Roanoke. Following the excursion, No. 2174 continued to handle revenue assignments, until it was retired from the N&W, in April 1960.

=== Scrapping ===
Shortly after it was retired, No. 2174 was sold to the United Iron & Metal Company and stored in their scrapyard in Roanoke along with fellow Y6b No. 2189 and Y6 No. 2143. The rest of the Y6b class was scrapped between 1959 and 1961. The United Iron had not prioritized the scrapping of the three 2-8-8-2s, since they had already scrapped multiple other locomotives. By 1967, No. 2189 was scrapped, and No. 2174 and the tender-less No. 2143 remained in a corner of the company's yard.

During 1975, some local preservationists, including the Roanoke Chapter of the National Railway Historical Society (NRHS), made an attempt to acquire No. 2174. The Roanoke Chapter made a commitment to raise $1,000 to cosmetically restore the Y6b, but they did not have enough time to raise $50,000, the locomotive's scrap value, to purchase the locomotive. Also in 1975, United Iron was purchased by the British-based Bird International Company, and due to a slump in the steel industry at the time, the company ordered for Nos. 2143 and 2174 to be dismantled. In January 1976, No. 2143 was scrapped, and the following month, on February 11, the scrapping process on No. 2174 began. This decision stirred controversy among local railfans, including retired N&W employees who had operated Mallets in revenue service.

== See also ==
- Chicago, Burlington and Quincy 5632
- Illinois Central 2613
- Norfolk and Western 611
- Norfolk and Western 1218
- Norfolk and Western 2050
- Norfolk and Western 2156

== Bibliography ==
- Dixon, Thomas W. Jr.; Parker, Karen; Huddleston, Gene (2009). Norfolk & Western's Y-Class Articulated Steam Locomotives. TLC Publishing.
