= Chesapeake and Ohio classes J-1 and J-2 =

Steam locomotive

Chesapeake and Ohio class J-1
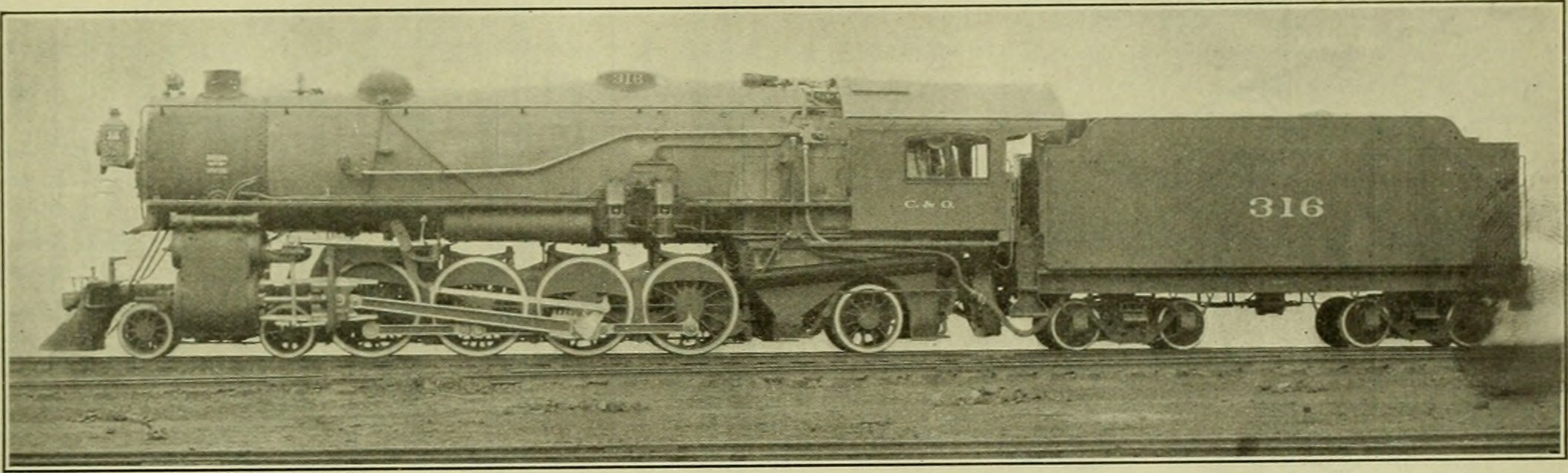
Type and origin
- Power type: Steam
- Builder: American Locomotive Company
- Serial number: 49840-49841, 50848
- Build date: May 1911, March 1912
- Total produced: 3
Specifications
- Configuration
  - Whyte: 4-8-2
  - UIC: 2′D1 h2
- Gauge: 4 ft 8 1/2 in (1,435 mm)
- Driver dia.: 62 in (1,574.8 mm)
- Adhesive weight: 238,000 lb (108 t; 106 long tons)
- Loco weight: 330,000 lb (150 t; 150 long tons)
- Tender weight: 219,100 lb (99.4 t; 97.8 long tons)
- Total weight: 549,100 lb (249.1 t; 245.1 long tons)
- Fuel type: Coal
- Fuel capacity: 15 short tons (14 t)
- Water cap.: 12,000 US gal (45,000 L; 10,000 imp gal)
- Firebox
  - Grate area: 66.5 sq ft (6.18 m^{2})
- Boiler pressure: 180 lbf (0.80 kN)
- Heating surface
  - Firebox: 338 sq ft (31.4 m^{2})
  - Total surface: 4,108 sq ft (381.6 m^{2})
- Superheater: 850 sq ft (79 m^{2})
- Cylinders: Two, outside
- Cylinder size: 29 in × 28 in (737 mm × 711 mm)
- Valve gear: Walschaerts
Performance figures
- Tractive effort: 58,110 lbf (258.49 kN)
- Factor of adh.: 4.10
Career
- Operators: Chesapeake and Ohio Railway
- Numbers: 316-318 (later 130-132 (later 540-542))
- Retired: 1946-1948
- Disposition: All scrapped

Chesapeake and Ohio class J-2
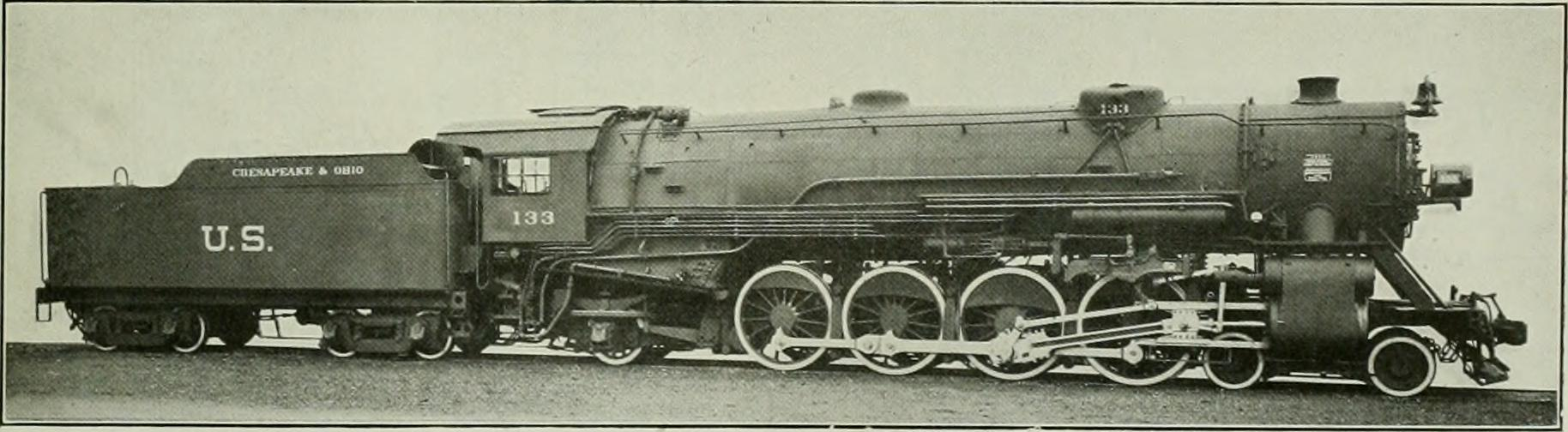
Type and origin
- Power type: Steam
- Builder: American Locomotive Company and Baldwin Locomotive Works
- Serial number: ALCO: 59810-59812 (1918); Baldwin: 51880-51881 (1919)
- Build date: December 1918, June 1919
- Total produced: 5
Specifications
- Configuration
  - Whyte: 4-8-2
  - UIC: 2′D1 h2
- Gauge: 4 ft 8 1/2 in (1,435 mm)
- Driver dia.: 69 in (1,752.6 mm)
- Adhesive weight: 243,000 lb (110 t; 108 long tons)
- Loco weight: 352,500 lb (159.9 t; 157.4 long tons)
- Tender weight: 194,200 lb (88.1 t; 86.7 long tons)
- Total weight: 546,700 lb (248.0 t; 244.1 long tons)
- Fuel type: Coal
- Fuel capacity: 10 short tons (9.1 t)
- Water cap.: 10,000 US gal (38,000 L; 8,300 imp gal)
- Firebox
  - Grate area: 76.3 sq ft (7.09 m^{2})
- Boiler pressure: 200 lbf (0.89 kN)
- Heating surface
  - Firebox: 373 sq ft (34.7 m^{2})
  - Total surface: 4,666 sq ft (433.5 m^{2})
- Superheater: 1,085 sq ft (100.8 m^{2})
- Cylinders: Two, outside
- Cylinder size: 28 in × 30 in (711 mm × 762 mm)
- Valve gear: Baker
Performance figures
- Tractive effort: 57,948 lbf (257.77 kN)
- Factor of adh.: 4.19
Career
- Operators: Chesapeake and Ohio Railway
- Numbers: 133-137 (later 543-547)
- Retired: 1949-1952
- Disposition: All but one tender scrapped

Chesapeake and Ohio class J-2a
Type and origin
- Power type: Steam
- Builder: American Locomotive Company
- Serial number: ALCO: 64216-64217 (1923)
- Build date: July 1922
- Total produced: 2
Specifications
- Configuration
  - Whyte: 4-8-2
  - UIC: 2′D1 h2
- Gauge: 4 ft 8 1/2 in (1,435 mm)
- Driver dia.: 69 in (1,752.6 mm)
- Adhesive weight: 246,850 lb (111.97 t; 110.20 long tons)
- Loco weight: 363,550 lb (164.90 t; 162.30 long tons)
- Tender weight: 300,000 lb (140 t; 130 long tons)
- Total weight: 663,550 lb (300.98 t; 296.23 long tons)
- Fuel type: Coal
- Fuel capacity: 16 short tons (15 t)
- Water cap.: 16,000 US gal (61,000 L; 13,000 imp gal)
- Firebox
  - Grate area: 76.2 sq ft (7.08 m^{2})
- Boiler pressure: 200 lbf (0.89 kN)
- Heating surface
  - Firebox: 438 sq ft (40.7 m^{2})
  - Total surface: 4,727 sq ft (439.2 m^{2})
- Superheater: 1,085 sq ft (100.8 m^{2})
- Cylinders: Two, outside
- Cylinder size: 28 in × 30 in (711 mm × 762 mm)
- Valve gear: Walschaerts
Performance figures
- Tractive effort: 57,948 lbf (257.77 kN)
- Factor of adh.: 4.26
Career
- Operators: Chesapeake and Ohio Railway
- Numbers: 138-139 (later 548-549)
- Retired: 1949-1952
- Disposition: All scrapped

The Chesapeake and Ohio Railway's J-1 and J-2 classes were two classes of 4-8-2 steam locomotives introduced on the Chesapeake and Ohio (C&O) for hauling heavy passenger trains over the Allegheny Mountains. The J-1s were the first 4-8-2s in the United States and earned the wheel arrangement the name of "Mountains" after the C&O's Mountain Divisions over which they would traverse.

== C&O class J-1 ==
In the 1900s, the Chesapeake and Ohio Railway (C&O) decided to replace their wooden coaches with all-steel heavyweight coaches. These would be much safer, more economical, and allow for greater passenger numbers. However, these heavier trains strained the limits of the 4-4-0s and 4-6-0s being used at this time. After noticing the use of 4-6-2 "Pacific"-types on the Missouri Pacific, with their P-69 Class of 1902, the C&O followed suit with their F-15 Class. However, nine years later, the C&O decided to enlarge the 4-6-2 wheel arrangement by lengthening the boiler and the frames and adding an extra pair of driving wheels. This would, in theory, provide more adhesion and distribute the weight better than its six-coupled counterpart. The first two members, 316 and 317, were completed in May 1911, with a third member being completed in March the following year.

With a tractive effort of 58,110 pounds, the class proved to be nearly twice as powerful as the F-15 Class Pacifics. Unfortunately, the small driving wheels and large rods made the trio rough riders and resulted in a high amount of hammer blow to the track. The fact that the crank was on the third axle did not help to ameliorate the issue. As a result, the C&O did not order or purchase any more Mountain-types. Instead, they decided to build more powerful Pacifics such as the F-16s of 1913. Although not as powerful, the F-16s could provide a smoother ride at speeds.

Thankfully, by the 1920s, a solution did arise. This involved lengthening the piston rods and using extra yokes to support the crosshead. After the rebuild, the J-1s, which were now renumbered 130–132, proved to be much more successful and had less of an issue with rough riding and high hammer blow. By 1924, the class was completely renumbered 540–542.

During World War II, the J-1s were used on freight trains over the Allegheny Mountains that they called home. Afterwards, they returned to their original passenger duties over the Mountain Divisions but didn't last longer than a few more years in service.

== C&O classes J-2 and J-2a ==
In December 1918, the C&O purchased three USRA Heavy Mountain-types from the American Locomotive Company's Brooks Works in Dunkirk, New York. Classified as J-2 by the C&O, they proved to be much more successful than the J-1s, despite having about 200 pounds less tractive effort. The J-2s also had Baker valve gear with the crank being positioned on the second driving axle instead of the third. This eliminated the issue of hammer blow and rough riding. Then, in June 1919, the C&O purchased two more Heavy Mountains from Baldwin Locomotive Works. The final two members were delivered from ALCO's Richmond Works of Richmond, Virginia to the C&O in July 1923, bringing a class total of seven members. These last two members, 138 and 139, featured Walschaerts valve gear instead of Baker valve gear and were classified as J-2a. About a year after their arrival, the J-2s were all renumbered 543–549.

In the 1930s, the J-2s received a new general look during their next general overhauls. These included the relocation of the Westinghouse air pumps to the front of the smokebox, new cabs, Vanderbilt tenders, and new feedwater heaters. This was to bring them in line with the C&O's locomotive modernization program.

== Decline and withdrawal ==
By the 1930s and 1940s, the J-1s and J-2s started to be replaced on passenger trains by "super-power" locomotives, in the form of the J-3 class 4-8-4s and the L-2 4-6-4s. All of the J-1s were retired by 1948, with the last of the J-2s retired by 1952, when the C&O dieselized their passenger trains. The only remaining relic from either class is a tender from J-2 No. 545.
