= Norfolk and Western Class A =

Class of American steam locomotives

Norfolk and Western A class
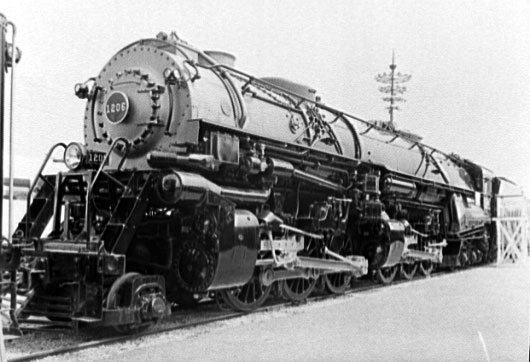
- Norfolk & Western No. 1206 at the New York World's Fair on June 17, 1939
Type and origin
- Power type: Steam
- Designer: John A. Pilcher
- Builder: Roanoke Shops (East End Shops)
- Serial number: 266–267, 273–280, 332–346, 353–362, 380–387
- Build date: 1936–1950
- Total produced: 43
Specifications
- Configuration
  - Whyte: 2-6-6-4
  - UIC: (1′C)C2′ h4g
- Gauge: 4 ft 8 1/2 in (1,435 mm) standard gauge
- Leading dia.: 33 in (838 mm)
- Driver dia.: 70 in (1,778 mm)
- Trailing dia.: 42 in (1,067 mm)
- Wheelbase: Loco & tender: 108.27 ft (33.00 m)
- Length: 121 ft 9 1/4 in (37.1 m) including tender
- Width: 11 ft (3.35 m)
- Height: 15 ft 10 in (4.83 m)
- Axle load: 72,000 lb (33,000 kilograms; 33 metric tons)
- Adhesive weight: 433,350 lb (196,560 kilograms; 196.56 metric tons)
- Loco weight: 573,000 lb (260,000 kilograms; 260 metric tons)
- Tender weight: 378,600 lb (171,700 kilograms; 171.7 metric tons)
- Total weight: 951,600 lb (431,600 kilograms; 431.6 metric tons)
- Fuel type: Coal
- Fuel capacity: 30 short tons (27 t)
- Water cap.: 22,000 US gal (83,000 L; 18,000 imp gal)
- Fuel consumption: 7 short tons (6.4 t) of coal per hour 13,906 US gal (52,640 L; 11,579 imp gal) of water per hour
- Firebox
  - Grate area: 122 sq ft (11.3 m^{2})
- Boiler: 106 in (2,692 mm)
- Boiler pressure: 300 lbf/in^{2} (2.07 MPa)
- Heating surface
  - Firebox: 587 sq ft (54.5 m^{2})
- Superheater
  - Type: Type E
  - Heating area: 2,703 sq ft (251.1 m^{2})
- Cylinders: Four
- Cylinder size: 24 in × 30 in (610 mm × 762 mm)
- Valve gear: Baker
Performance figures
- Maximum speed: Over 70 mph (110 km/h)
- Power output: 5,600 hp (4,180 kW)
- Tractive effort: 114,000 lbf (507.10 kN)
- Factor of adh.: 3.8
Career
- Operators: Norfolk and Western Railway
- Class: A
- Numbers: 1200–1242
- Retired: 1958–1959
- Preserved: (No. 1218)
- Disposition: One preserved, remainder scrapped

The Norfolk and Western "A" was a class of 43 2-6-6-4 simple articulated steam locomotives built by the Norfolk and Western's (N&W) Roanoke Shops in Roanoke, Virginia, between 1936 and 1950 and operated until the late 1950s. These articulated locomotives were designed to haul both fast freight and passenger trains for the N&W and only one has been preserved, No. 1218.

== History ==
=== Background ===
During the mid-1920s, the Norfolk and Western (N&W) Railway compromises a large fleet of compound Mallet type locomotives reliable enough for heavy freight work. However, the N&W were lacking a suitable locomotive needed to pull fast freight or merchandise trains. After World War I ended, the railroad ordered a second batch of 4-8-2 USRA Heavy Mountain (K2a) class and assigned them to double head with the 4-8-0 M class locomotives on pulling fast freight trains. While the K2as run well on flat terrain, pulling medium weight freight trains, they lacked the power of pulling heavier freight trains at desired speeds.

At the quest of needing more power, N&W built their own class of ten 4-8-2s, the K3s, at their Roanoke Shops in Roanoke, Virginia, during 1926. Although the K3s were designed specifically for dual service, they were not fully satisfactory due to running gear and counterbalancing issues. The K3s also lack the suitable power of handling timed freight trains over the mountains and with speed limitations inherent of their 63 in (1,600 mm) driving wheels, fell short of speeds on level portions of the mainline. In a vain attempt to upgrade their existing roster during 1928, N&W converted one of its 2-6-6-2 Z1 class, No. 1399, to a four-cylinder single expansion locomotive and classify it as a Z2. Although the starting tractive effort of No. 1399 was higher, the boiler was too small to supply steam for the four high-pressure cylinders and the locomotive was too light to provide adequate adhesion.

=== Introduction and construction ===
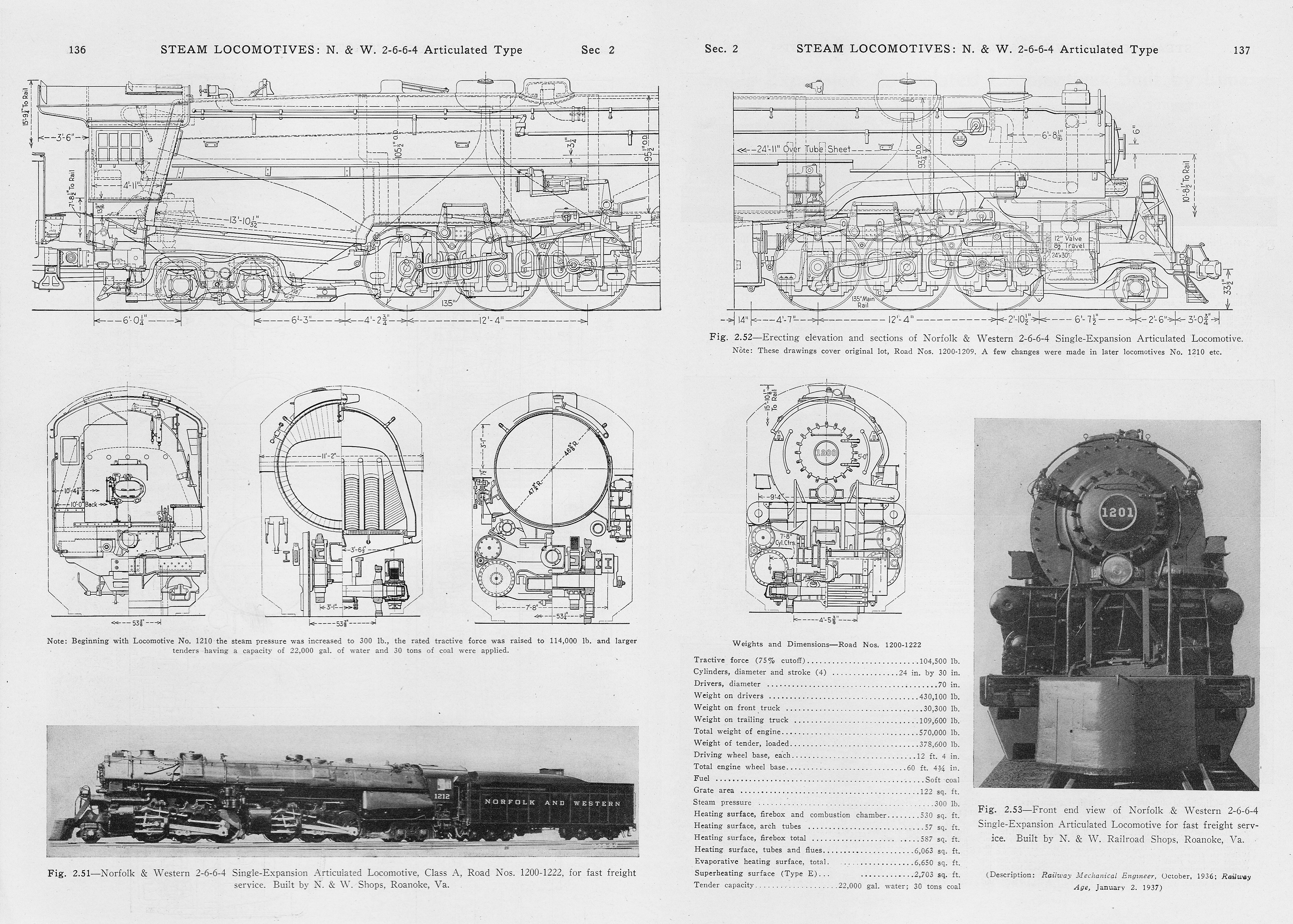
A drawing design of the N&W class A locomotive

By the mid-1930s, N&W decided to make plans to design a new heavy Mallet type locomotive needed to eliminate the double-heading of passenger trains and pulling timed freight trains. Upon delivery on the class starting in 1936, starting with 1200 and 1201, they were tested and proved successful. The railroad was satisfied with the class and bought eight more the following year. During testing, N&W officials were very impressed with their performance, as they were capable of pulling 4,800 tons at 25 mph on a 0.5% grade and 7,500 tons at 64 mph on level track. During World War II, the railroad built 25 more "A"s between 1943 and 1944 and finally eight more between 1949 and 1950. They were some of the last mainline steam locomotives to be put into service.

The locomotives had a cast-steel frame and Timken roller bearings on nearly every surface. The last five had McGill MultiRol roller bearings in the side and main rods, making them the only articulated locomotives to take such friction-reducing measures. They were assigned to freight service and have pulled slower heavy freight trains as well as fast time freight. They were rated at 13,000 tons of drag freight between Williamson, West Virginia and Portsmouth, Ohio, and could reach speeds up to 42 mph pulling such a load. Between Portsmouth and Columbus, Ohio, they were rated at 5,200 tons of fast freight and could reach 65 mph. On passenger runs, they could reach 70 mph. Over the Kenova District, the railroad increased the "A"'s slow freight tonnage ratings from 13,000 to 14,500 tons. To reduce the amount of stops for water, they ran with auxiliary tenders with capacities of up to 20,800 gallons of water. (Note: Stopping for water implied having to restart the train, which could be difficult if the stop was on a slight uphill grade. Avoiding troublesome stopping points allowed pulling a heavier train. This is similar to the concept of momentum grades.) This also increased gross ton-miles per train hour (GTM) 31% on the 112-mile Kenova District between Williamson and Portsmouth, Ohio.

In 1952, the N&W tested one of the "A"s and Y6b-class locomotives against a four-unit Electro-Motive Division (at that time, of General Motors) F7 diesel set. The tests indicated that fuel costs and similar items were roughly the same, and the test was considered a tie. However, diesels eventually won out for lower maintenance and other operational costs. As successful as the class was, diesels eventually replaced them. Retirement started in 1958 and by 1959, all of the "A"s had been retired.

== Roster ==
Table of orders and numbers
Year built	Quantity	Serial nos.	N&W no.	Notes
1936	2	266–267	1200–1201	Scrapped May 1958.
1937	8	273–280	1202-1209	Scrapped June 1958. No. 1202 scrapped in September 1964.
1943	15	332–346	1210–1224	No. 1218 preserved, ran excursions between 1987 and 1991, sole remaining 2-6-6-4. Remainder scrapped October 1958-December 1959.
1944	10	353–362	1225–1234	Scrapped July 1959. No. 1230 scrapped in September 1964.
1949–1950	8	380–387	1235–1242	Scrapped August-September 1959. Nos. 1238-1242 equipped with Timken Roller Bearing Rods.

== Notable examples ==
=== No. 1218 ===
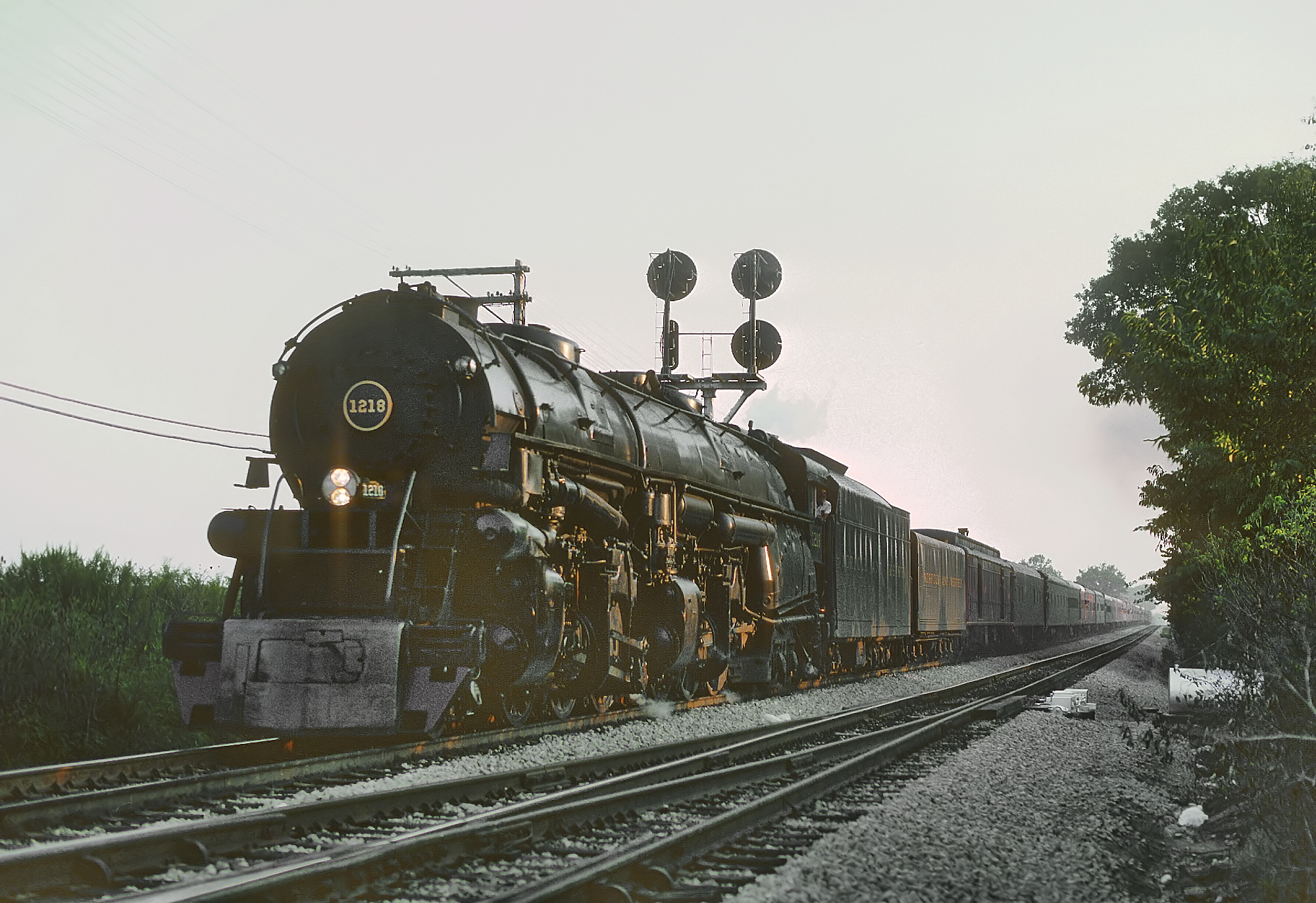
Norfolk and Western No. 1218 puling an excursion in Bellevue, Ohio in 1987

No. 1218 is the only class A locomotive to be preserved, which also makes it the only surviving 2-6-6-4 steam locomotive in the world. It was retired in 1959 and on the same year, it was purchased by the Union Carbide Co. in Charleston, West Virginia, where it was used as a stationary boiler at a chemical plant. In 1965, No. 1218 was repurchased by New England millionaire F. Nelson Blount for his locomotive collection at Steamtown, U.S.A. in Bellows Falls, Vermont. Three years later, its former owner did a cosmetic restoration on No. 1218 at their East End Shops in Roanoke, Virginia (the same place where it was built). After that, it was put on display at the Roanoke Transportation Museum in 1971. It was restored and operated in excursion service for the Norfolk Southern steam program between 1987 and 1991 and went for an overhaul. The program was then canceled in 1994, and No. 1218 was eventually put back on display at the Virginia Museum of Transportation in Roanoke.

=== No. 1240 ===
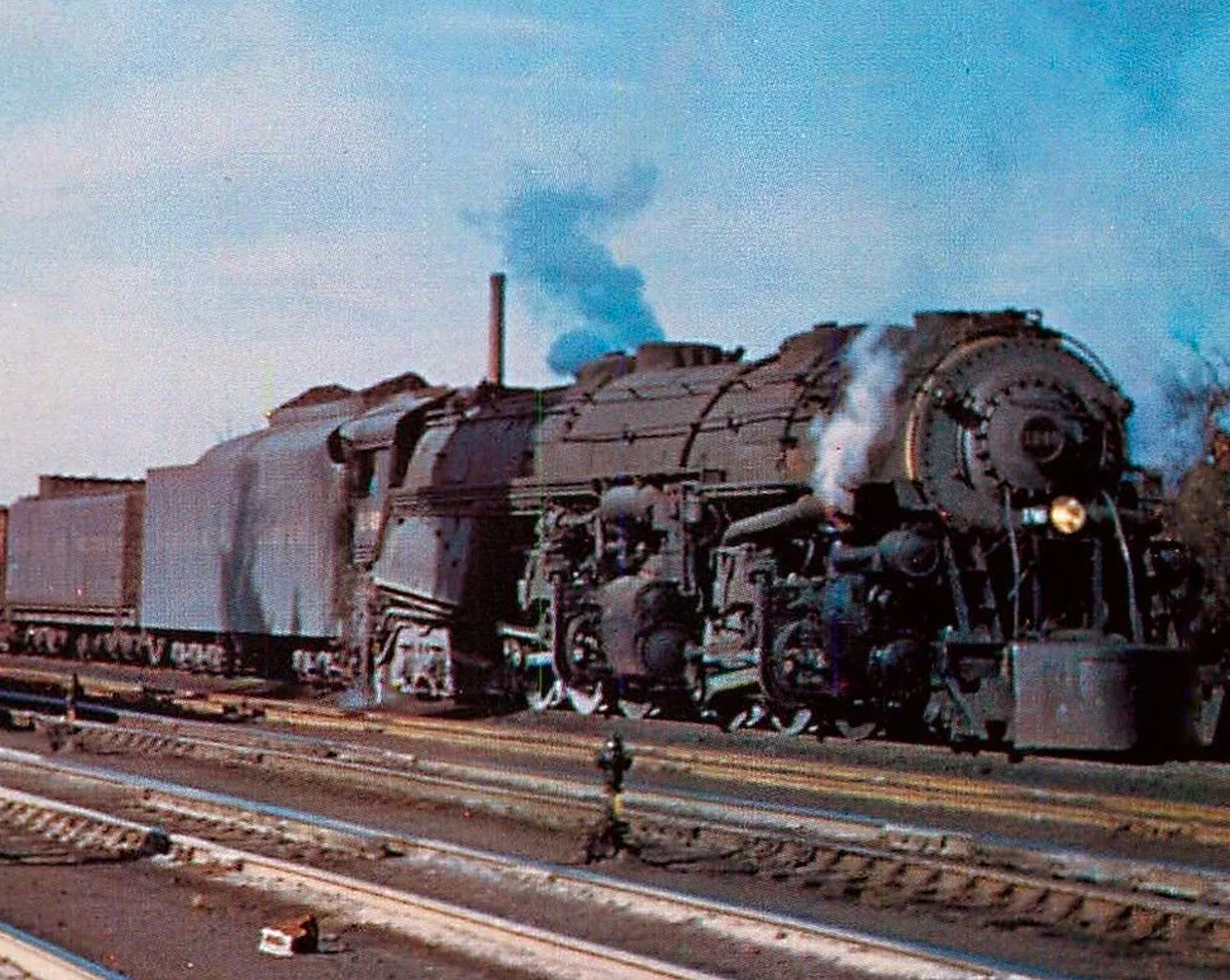
Norfolk and Western No. 1240 at Norfolk, Virginia c. 1956

On July 11, 1959, No. 1240 was fired up and used on the N&W's Farewell to Steam excursion train along with class Y6b No. 2174. No. 1240 pulled the excursion from Roanoke, Virginia to Bluefield, West Virginia, where the train was transferred to No. 2174, which ten pulled it through the N&W's Pocahontas Division to Iaeger, and then it travelled over the Dry Fork Branch to Cedar Bluff. No. 2174 returned the excursion to Bluefield, and then No. 1240 returned the train to Roanoke. When the Farewell to Steam excursion had ended that same year in 1959, No. 1240 was sold for scrap.

== Bibliography ==
- Drury, George H. (2015). Guide to North American Steam Locomotives (2nd ed.). Kalmbach Media. ISBN 978-1-62700-259-2.
- Jeffries, Lewis (2005). N&W: Giant of Steam, Revised Edition (2nd ed.). Norfolk and Western Historical Society, Inc. ISBN 0-9704794-5-X.
- King, Ed (1991). The A: Norfolk & Western's Mercedes of Steam First Edition (1st ed.). Trans-Anglo Books. ISBN 0-870460-96-X.
- Wrinn, Jim (2000). Steam's Camelot: Southern and Norfolk Southern Excursions in Color (1st ed.). TLC Publishing. ISBN 1-883089-56-5.
- Solomon, Brian (2015). The Majesty of Big Steam. Voyageur Press. ISBN 978-0-7603-4892-5.
