= Norfolk and Western 1218 =

Preserved N&W class A locomotive

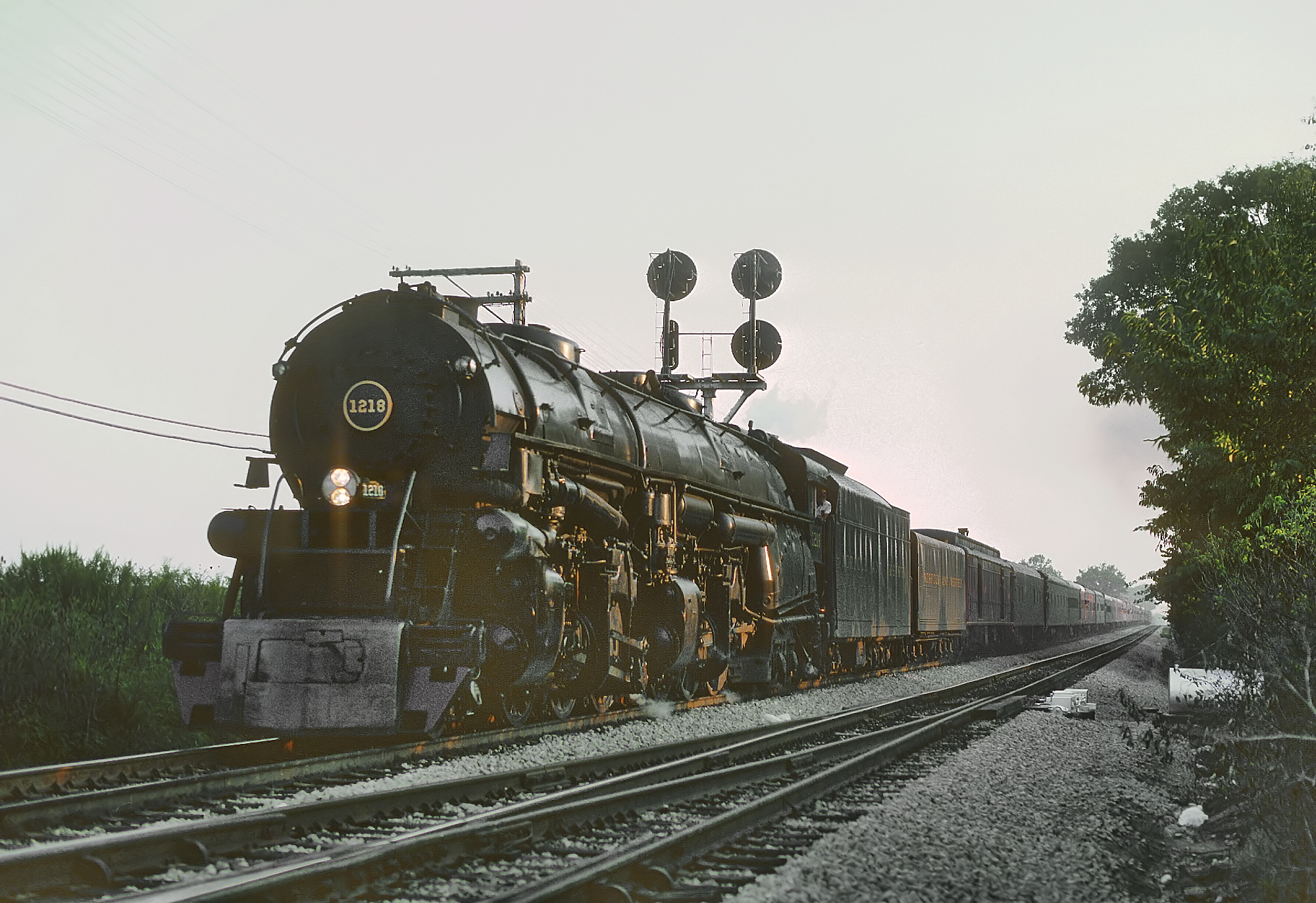
- Norfolk and Western No. 1218 leads an excursion through Bellevue, Ohio in August 1987
Type and origin
- Power type: Steam
- Designer: John A. Pilcher
- Builder: Roanoke Shops (East End Shops)
- Serial number: 340
- Build date: June 2, 1943
Specifications
- Configuration
  - Whyte: 2-6-6-4
  - UIC: (1′C)C2′ h4g
- Gauge: 4 ft 8 1/2 in (1,435 mm)
- Leading dia.: 33 in (838 mm)
- Driver dia.: 70 in (1,778 mm)
- Trailing dia.: 42 in (1,067 mm)
- Length: 121 ft 9 1/4 in (37.1 m) including tender
- Width: 11 ft 2 in (3.4 m)
- Height: 16 ft (4.88 m)
- Axle load: 72,000 lb (32.7 tonnes)
- Adhesive weight: 433,350 lb (196.6 tonnes)
- Loco weight: 573,000 lb (259.9 tonnes)
- Tender weight: 378,600 lb (171.7 tonnes)
- Total weight: 951,600 lb (431.6 tonnes)
- Fuel type: Coal
- Fuel capacity: 35 t (34.4 long tons; 38.6 short tons)
- Water cap.: 22,000 US gal (83,000 L; 18,000 imp gal)
- Fuel consumption: 7 short tons (6.4 t) of coal per hour 13,906 US gal (52,640 L; 11,579 imp gal) of water per hour
- Firebox
  - Grate area: 122 sq ft (11.3 m^{2})
- Boiler: 106 in (2,692 mm)
- Boiler pressure: 300 lbf/in^{2} (2.07 MPa)
- Heating surface
  - Firebox: 587 sq ft (54.5 m^{2})
  - Tubes and flues: 6,052 sq ft (562.2 m^{2})
- Superheater
  - Type: Type E
  - Heating area: 2,703 sq ft (251.1 m^{2})
- Cylinders: Four, simple articulated
- Cylinder size: 24 in × 30 in (610 mm × 762 mm)
- Valve gear: Baker
- Valve type: Piston valves
- Loco brake: Air
- Train brakes: Air
- Couplers: Knuckle
Performance figures
- Maximum speed: 70 mph (110 km/h)
- Power output: 5,400 hp (4,000 kW)
- Tractive effort: 114,000 lbf (507.10 kN)
- Factor of adh.: 3.8
Career
- Operators: Norfolk and Western Railway→Norfolk Southern Railway
- Class: A
- Number in class: 19 of 43
- Numbers: N&W 1218
- Nicknames: The Mercede of Steam
- Locale: United States, South and Midwest
- Retired: July 1959 (revenue service); November 1991 (excursion service)
- Preserved: September 1964
- Restored: March 26, 1987
- Current owner: Virginia Museum of Transportation
- Disposition: On static display
- Norfolk & Western Class A No. 1218 Locomotive
- U.S. National Register of Historic Places
- Location within Virginia Location within the United States
- Location: 303 Norfolk Avenue SW, Roanoke, Virginia
- Coordinates: 37.272943°N 79.947231°W
- Built: 1943
- Built by: Roanoke Shops
- NRHP reference No.: 100011843
- Added to NRHP: May 19, 2025

Norfolk and Western 1218 is the only surviving example of the Norfolk and Western Railway's (N&W) class A 2-6-6-4 steam locomotives. It was built in June 1943 by N&W's Roanoke (East End) Shops in Roanoke, Virginia to haul both fast passenger and freight trains around the N&W system. No. 1218 was retired from regular revenue service in July 1959 and sold to the Union Carbide Company (UCC) to be used as a stand-by stationary boiler at one of their chemical plants in South Charleston, West Virginia. In 1964, No. 1218 was sold to F. Nelson Blount, who added it to his Steamtown, U.S.A. collection for preservation and display.

In 1969, it was relocated to Roanoke, where it was cosmetically restored and put on display at the Roanoke Transportation Museum; later known as the Virginia Museum of Transportation (VMT). In 1985, No. 1218 was removed from display by Norfolk Southern (NS), and in 1987, it was restored and placed into service on NS' steam excursion program. It hauled a number of excursions until 1991, when it began to undergo an overhaul. After NS cancelled the steam program in 1994, No. 1218 returned to Roanoke, where it was returned to display at the VMT in 2003, and it was donated proper to them in 2012. As of 2026, the locomotive remains on static display at the museum.

== History ==
=== Background and revenue service ===
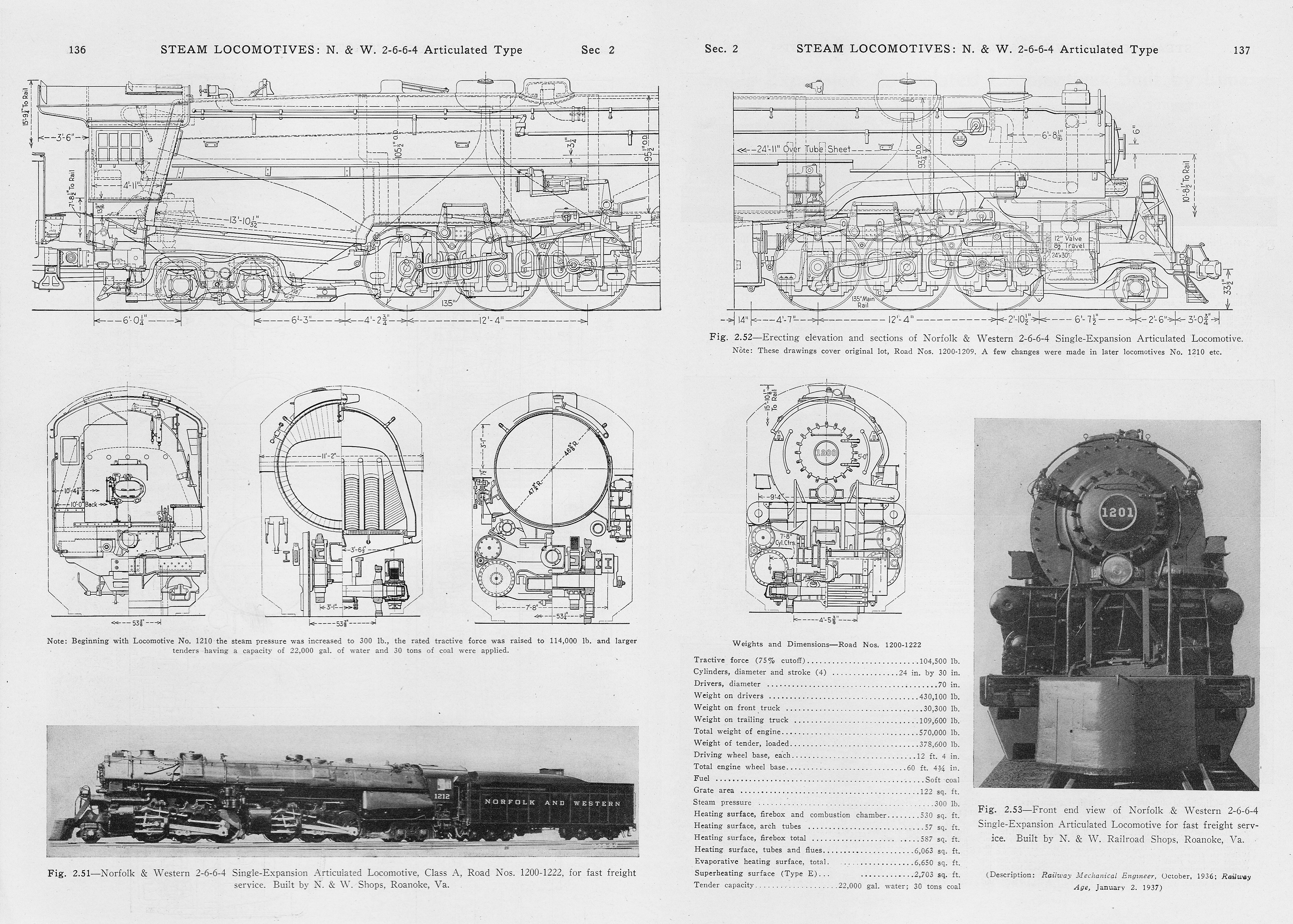
A drawing design of the N&W class A locomotive

By the mid-1930s, the Norfolk and Western Railway (N&W) was looking into creating a new class of mallet locomotives to haul their heavy freight and passenger trains at high speeds, assignments that their K2 and K3 classes of 4-8-2 "Mountain"-types were struggling to handle. The railway's chief mechanical engineer, John A. Pilcher, created a simple articulated design with equal-sized 24-by-30-inch (610 mm × 760 mm) cylinders and a 2-6-6-4 wheel arrangement. The wheel arrangement had previously been created by the Baldwin Locomotive Works for the Pittsburgh and West Virginia (P&WV) and the Seaboard Air Line (SAL), but the N&W design had larger diameter driving wheels at 70 inches (1,800 mm), a greater weight on the driving wheels, and a larger firebox grate area at 122 square feet (11.3 m^{2}).

In 1936, the N&W built two prototypes, Nos. 1200 and 1201, at their Roanoke (East End) Shops in Roanoke, Virginia, and they were designated as class As. The two As were deemed a success, and a second batch of eight locomotives (Nos. 1202–1209) followed in 1937. The As were initially built with "chicken coop" cowcatchers, lightweight multiple-bearing crossheads for the valve gear, Timken roller bearings for all axles, lateral motion control, and a boiler pressure of 275 psi (1,900 kPa). They were mainly assigned to haul manifest freight and heavy passenger trains throughout the N&W's system, mostly over flat terrain at high speeds, and while they did operate over the N&W's Blue Ridge Mountain grades at lower speeds, their maximum cutoff (75%) and factor of adhesion (3.72) were set for flatland operations.

During World War II, as the N&W was in need of additional locomotives to accommodate their wartime traffic surge, 25 more class As were built (third batch (Nos. 1210–1224) in 1943; fourth batch (Nos. 1225–1234) in 1944), and the design was upgraded with alligator crosshead guides and a boiler pressure of 300 psi (2,100 kPa), and their tractive effort became rated at 114,000 pounds-force (510 kN). The latter two modifications were applied to the earlier As. No. 1218 was the ninth member of the third batch, being completed at the East End Shops on June 2, 1943, and it was first assigned to haul troop trains.

After the war ended, No. 1218, along with most of the other As, were rebuilt with the crown sheet lowered to keep water from overflowing into the dry pipe, and they were upgraded with a cast steel pilot with a retractable coupler, an air system aftercooler on the pilot deck, and a larger tender for greater coal and water capacity. The final batch of class As (Nos. 1235–1242) was subsequently built with all the modifications the earlier As had, along with Timken roller bearing rods. In peacetime, No. 1218 was assigned to haul fast freight trains, heavy coal trains, and heavy passenger trains on the N&W's Scioto Division, between Williamson, West Virginia, Portsmouth, Ohio, and Columbus, Ohio, and it made some occasional side trips to Cincinnati. In the late 1950s, No. 1218 was reassigned to the Norfolk Division, running between Roanoke and Norfolk, Virginia.

=== First retirement and preservation ===
In 1958, under the presidency of Stuart T. Saunders, the N&W began to dieselize the entirety of their locomotive roster, and retirement of the class As began that same year. In July 1959, No. 1218 was retired from revenue service and was planned to be sold for scrap, as the railway had no plans to preserve any of the As. Concurrently, the Union Carbide Company (UCC) placed an order for three retired locomotives from the N&W, as the company was in need of spare stationary boilers for one of their chemical plants in South Charleston, West Virginia. In response, the N&W delivered No. 1218, along with fellow class As Nos. 1202 and 1230, to Union Carbide, which in turn moved them to their South Charleston plant at Blaine Island within the Kanawha River.

UCC saw no use for their tenders and scheduled for all three to be scrapped, but employee Phil Titus intervened: he arranged with a friend and FMC official to have them stored on some spare sidings at FMC's own South Charleston facility. Nos. 1218, 1202 and 1230 were converted as stationary boilers by being lined up with their cabs adjacent to each other; a makeshift platform being built between the cabs; gas pipes being connected to their fireboxes; and steam pipes being connected to their smokeboxes. The three locomotives were used during freezing winter months and whenever one of UCC's main boilers had to shut down.

In June 1964, amidst changing conditions, UCC decommissioned the class As, removed them from the plant, and sold them for scrap, along with their tenders, to the Raleigh Junk Company. Titus, along with fellow employee George Greenacre, looked for someone who could acquire and prevent one of the As from being scrapped, and they quickly contacted New England millionaire F. Nelson Blount, who had established his own collection of steam locomotives at Steamtown, U.S.A. in Bellows Falls, Vermont.

Blount agreed to add one of the As to his collection, and he authorized for a purchase of a locomotive in the best condition and with parts from the others added to make it complete. By September 1964, No. 1218 was chosen alongside its tender, and while Raleigh Junk was cutting up Nos. 1202 and 1230 along with their tenders, Titus and Greenacre cannibalized many parts from them, including an air pump, the crosshead guide yokes, the front side rods, and the gauges, and applied them to No. 1218. By 1965, No. 1218, which became the final surviving class A, was moved to Steamtown and put on display in a dilapidated appearance. That same year, Robert B. Claytor, the then-executive vice president of the N&W, became aware of No. 1218's status and believed it needed to be preserved within Roanoke, Virginia alongside sole-surviving N&W class J No. 611. On Claytor's behalf, the N&W negotiated with Steamtown and offered to acquire No. 1218.

In mid-1967, Blount agreed to put No. 1218 on a long-term lease to the N&W, and the locomotive was towed out of Bellows Falls. (Note: Sources conflict each other over No. 1218's transfer from Steamtown to Roanoke: newspapers at the time reported that the locomotive was purchased directly from Steamtown and did not leave Bellows Falls until 1969, after Blount's death, but according to other sources, including a 1987 Railfan & Railroad magazine article written by George Greenacre and Jim Boyd, the deal was a long-term lease—as evidenced by a 1984 trade for ownership of No. 1218 for two diesels—and it left Bellows Falls shortly before Blount's death in 1967.) In August, Blount died in an airplane crash, and No. 1218's move was halted at Binghamton, New York, while the Blount estate and the N&W disputed over the locomotive's status. By 1969, after the disputes were resolved, No. 1218 arrived in Roanoke, where the N&W subleased it to the City of Roanoke, and the locomotive underwent a cosmetic restoration at the N&W's East End Shops, the same place where it was built, to return its appearance to its as-built condition. In 1971, the restoration was completed, and on May 1, No. 1218 was temporarily displayed at the Roanoke station to coincide with the publicized final run of the N&W's Pocahontas passenger train, hauled by Nickel Plate Road 759. The class A was subsequently put on static display at the Roanoke Transportation Museum in Wasena Park alongside Chesapeake and Ohio (C&O) Allegheny No. 1604.

=== Excursion service ===
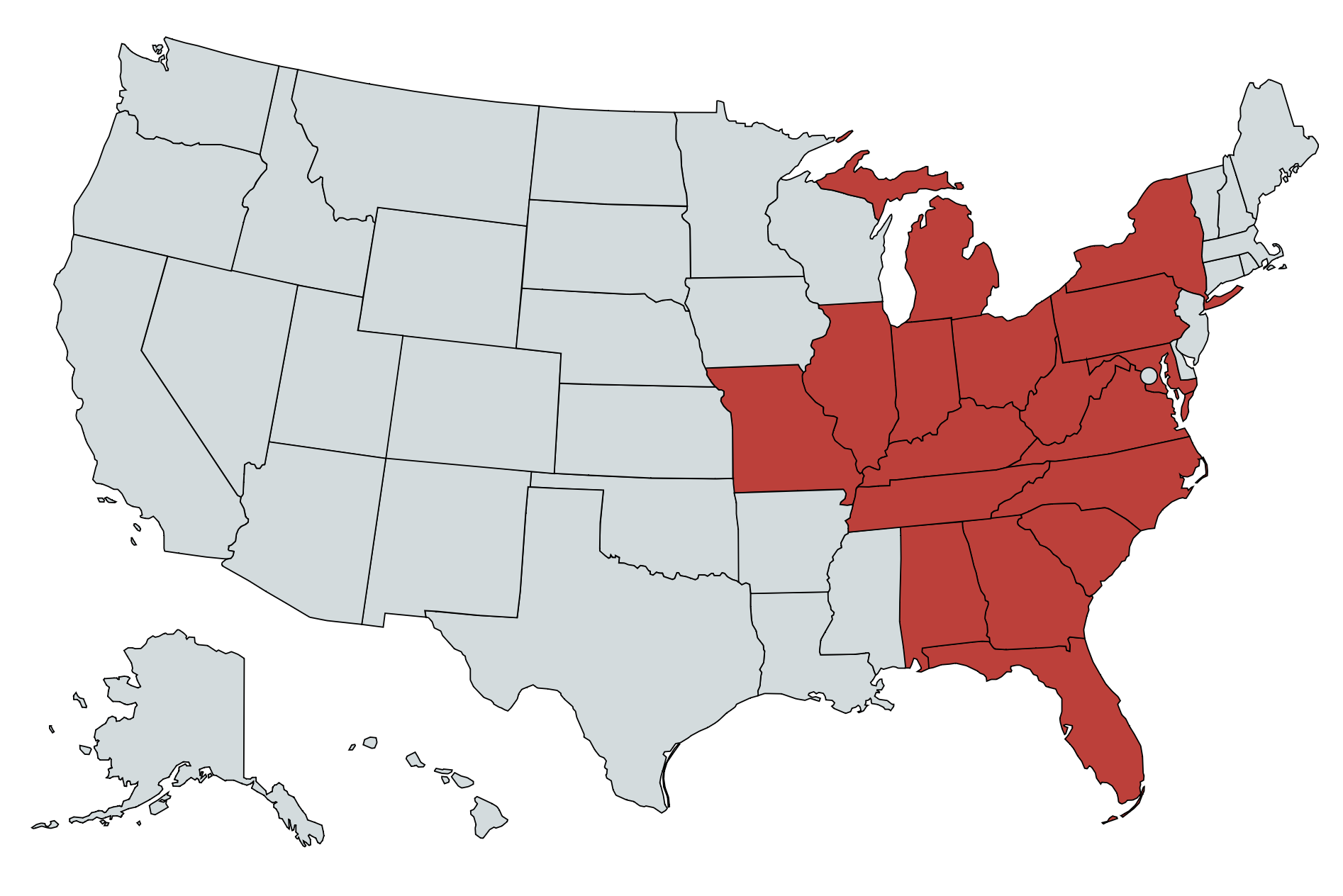
US states visited by No. 1218 in excursion service

In 1982, the N&W and the Southern Railway (SOU) both merged to form the new Norfolk Southern Railway (NS). Concurrently, No. 1218's feedwater pump was removed to replace the damaged one on No. 611, which was restored to operating condition for excursion service on the NS steam program, which started in 1966 by the SOU. In 1984, Robert Claytor, who by then was NS' chairman and CEO, considered having No. 1218 enter the steam program to pull the longer and heavier excursion trains along with assisting No. 611. Accompanied by ex-N&W road foreman Frank W. Collins, Claytor personally inspected No. 1218's smokebox and found that most of the piping connected to the cylinders had been cut out by UCC, but Collins encouraged Claytor to authorize further evaluation, reminding him that replacement pipes could have been fabricated, while most of No. 1218's other critical parts remained intact. The Steamtown Foundation, which still owned No. 1218, but was experiencing financial difficulties, agreed to trade the title of No. 1218 to NS in exchange for two EMD diesel locomotives (an ex-Wabash SW8 and ex-Nickel Plate Road GP9 No. 514).

On May 10, 1985, Norfolk Southern laid some temporary panel track over the museum's display tracks, and then No. 1218 was towed out of its display spot by two NS diesel locomotives and back to the East End Shops. (Note: The Roanoke Transportation Museum would be heavily damaged six months later by Hurricane Juan, but because No. 1218 had been towed out, it was uninvolved in the damage.) Upon being deemed fit for shipping, No. 1218 was further moved to the former Southern Railway's Norris Yard Workshop in Irondale, Alabama. Under the leadership of NS master mechanic of steam Doug Karhan, No. 1218 was disassembled for evaluation, and as work progressed, the project was shifted to a full-blown rebuild. The class A had to receive numerous replacement parts, many of which were fabricated by off-site fabricators and welders, along with machine tooling transferred from the Roanoke shops, and a replacement feedwater pump was received from one of the B&O Railroad Museum's steam locomotives. The tender tank also contained multiple rusted panels that were subsequently removed and replaced. No. 1218 was also retrofitted with a new 26-L type brake stand to accommodate easier repairs and improved self-lapping.

No. 1218's restoration was expected to be completed sometime in 1986, but due to unforeseen problems that required addressing, the completion was pushed back, and its scheduled excursion runs for that year were filled in by No. 611. On January 15, 1987, No. 1218 underwent a stationary test fire. That same month, James "Jim" Bistline, the steam program's long-time general manager, formally retired, and he was succeeded by ex-N&W employee Carl Jensen. The restoration cost was roughly $500,000. On March 26, No. 1218 moved under its power for the first time in 28 years; it performed a break-in run between Irondale and Wilton, Alabama. (Note: No. 1218 also received auxiliary water tender No. 614B—formerly from a Louisville and Nashville (L&N) 2-8-4 Big Emma M-1—which NS acquired from Ross Rowland.)

On April 21, 1987, at the site of the former Birmingham Terminal Station, No. 1218 was christened with a bottle of champagne by Claytor. Afterwards, it began its ferry run to Roanoke. On the way, the locomotive made an unscheduled stop at Anniston, Alabama, due to overheated rod brass bearings. The next day, it was repaired and arrived in Atlanta, where it met up with 4-6-2 Savannah and Atlanta 750, which was formerly leased by SOU/NS from 1968 to 1984 and operated by the New Georgia Railroad. On April 23, No. 1218 arrived back in Roanoke. On April 25, No. 1218 pulled its first public excursion for the NS steam program between Roanoke and Bluefield, West Virginia, but some heavy rain and flooding that day caused some mudslides and fallen trees to delay the trip's completion. The following day, No. 1218 pulled two more excursions between Roanoke, Lynchburg and Walton, without incident. On May 4, No. 1218 pulled an empty 100-hopper car train to Crewe, unassisted. In August, during the 1987 National Railway Historical Society (NRHS) convention in Roanoke, No. 1218 pulled an empty 50-hopper car train, where it ran side by side with No. 611, which pulled a 24-car excursion train from Roanoke to Radford, Virginia, in which the former double-headed with the latter for the return trip later on. Following the convention, No. 611 underwent an extensive FRA-mandated overhaul, leaving No. 1218 to haul almost all of the NS excursions for the remainder of 1987 and into 1988. In November 1987, No. 1218 visited Jacksonville, Florida and hauled three Suwanee Steam Special excursions between Jacksonville and Valdosta, Georgia, sponsored by the North Florida Chapter of the NRHS.

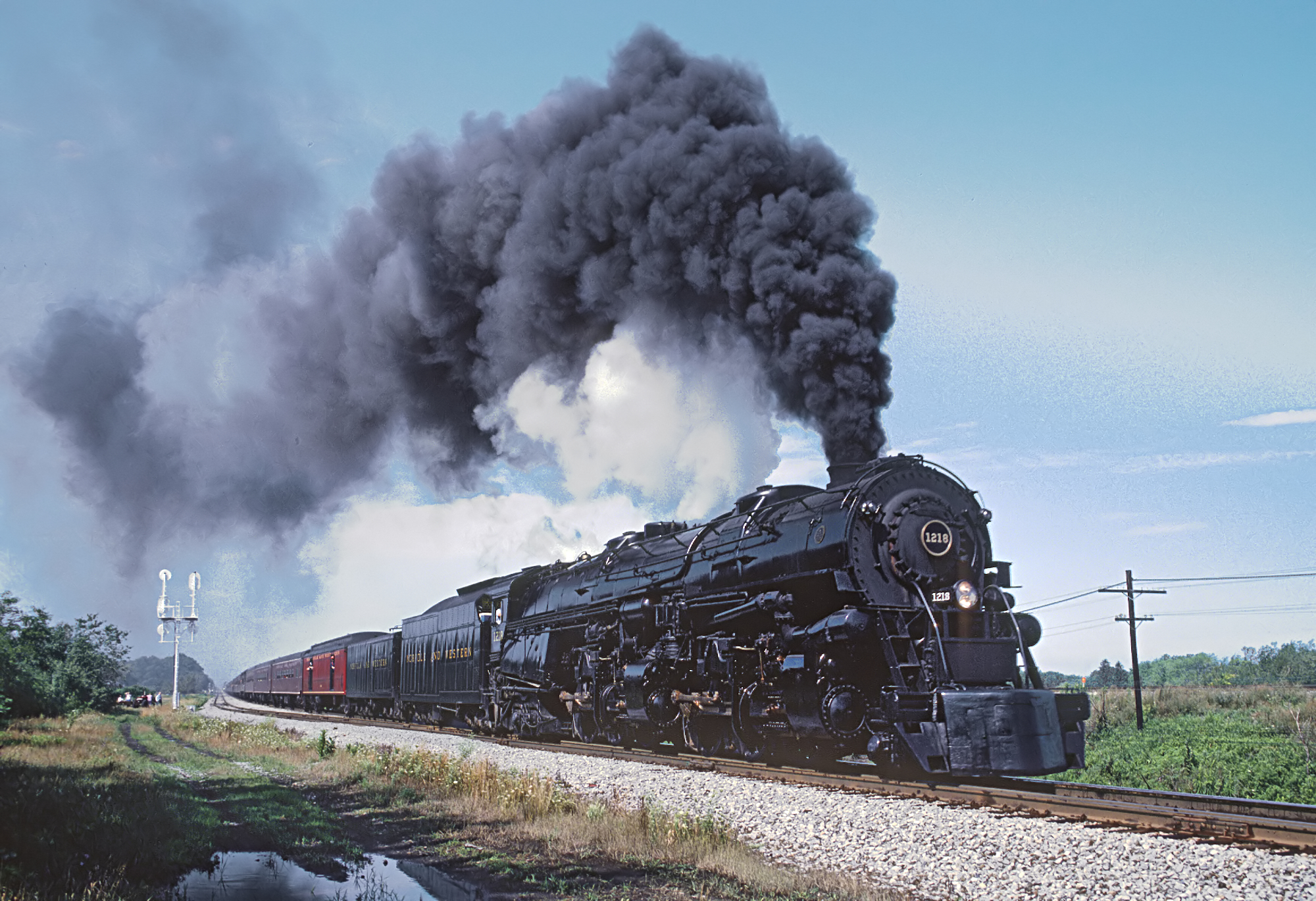
No. 1218 leads an excursion train in Brocton, New York, on August 6, 1988

In June 1988, No. 1218 hauled an annual long-distance excursion, the Independence Limited, over four days from Roanoke to Chicago, Illinois, but en route, on June 11, the locomotive collided with a truck at a crossing near Old Fort, Ohio. In July, No. 1218 hauled some excursions between Fort Wayne, Indiana and Detroit, Michigan, and then it traveled to Buffalo, New York for two roundtrips between Buffalo and Ashtabula, Ohio, sponsored by the Niagara Frontier Chapter NRHS. In September, No. 611 returned to service and handled most of the remainder of that year's operating season. Excursion ridership for the 1988 season reportedly increased from the previous year at 55,239 passengers with a profit of $257,000 out of a gross take of $1.9 million.

On July 16, 1989, No. 1218 performed a rare tripleheader excursion with No. 611 and Nickel Plate Road 587 from Roanoke to Lynchburg, Virginia, as a prelude to that year's NRHS convention held in Asheville, North Carolina. On July 18, No. 611 hauled the 14-car Asheville Special excursion from Alexandria to Salisbury, and at Lynchburg, No. 1218 was added to double-head. The following day, No. 1218 double-headed with No. 587 and the excursion to Asheville, where a night photo session was held on July 21, with North Carolina governor James Martin in attendance, and then No. 1218 returned the Asheville Special to Salisbury on July 23, with Martin briefly serving as the engineer.

In June 1990, No. 1218 hauled that year's Independence Limited from Columbus, Ohio to St. Louis, Missouri, and then it participated in the 1990 NRHS convention held at the former St. Louis Union Station, being displayed alongside steam locomotives Cotton Belt 819, Frisco 1522, and Union Pacific 844. Since No. 1218 had already been spotlighted for the previous two conventions it attended, it spent the majority of the St. Louis event on display, while the other three locomotives handled most of the convention excursions. On June 13, No. 1218 moved to Burlington Northern's (BN) former Frisco Chouteau Yard, where it posed alongside Nos. 844 and 1522 for a private photo session for Trains magazine's 50th anniversary. On June 17, half of No. 1218's excursion consist was temporarily added to No. 819's consist for a run from St. Louis to Illmo. On June 20, the final day of the convention, No. 1218 hauled an excursion between St. Louis and Kansas City over NS' former Wabash mainline.

In early 1991, No. 1218 underwent a maintenance period with No. 611 at the Norris Yard Steam Shop in Irondale, and their excursion schedules for April that year were filled in by Atlanta and West Point 290. On April 20, No. 1218 returned to service, and on May 11, as part of the 25th anniversary of Norfolk Southern's steam program, its smokebox plate was painted with an imperfect silver graphite and oil mix, and the outdoor heat turned it gold. In August 1991, No. 1218's smokebox plate received another imperfect graphite mix, resulting in a silver appearance. That same month, No. 1218 took part in that year's NRHS convention of Huntington, West Virginia, leading two excursion runs out of Kenova, before the rest of the convention was focused on Nickel Plate Road 765 and Pere Marquette 1225 operating over the CSX mainline. No. 611 was originally advertised to haul the Kenova excursions, but its prolonged repairs held it back. On November 3, as the main event for the steam program's 25th anniversary, No. 1218 joined No. 611 and Southern Railway 4501 to triple-head a 28-car passenger excursion train from Chattanooga, Tennessee to Atlanta, Georgia. At Ooltewah, Tennessee, No. 4501 took the first eight coaches for a complete round trip, turning around at Cleveland, Tennessee, and then Nos. 611 and 1218 completed the rest of the trip to Atlanta.

=== Second retirement ===
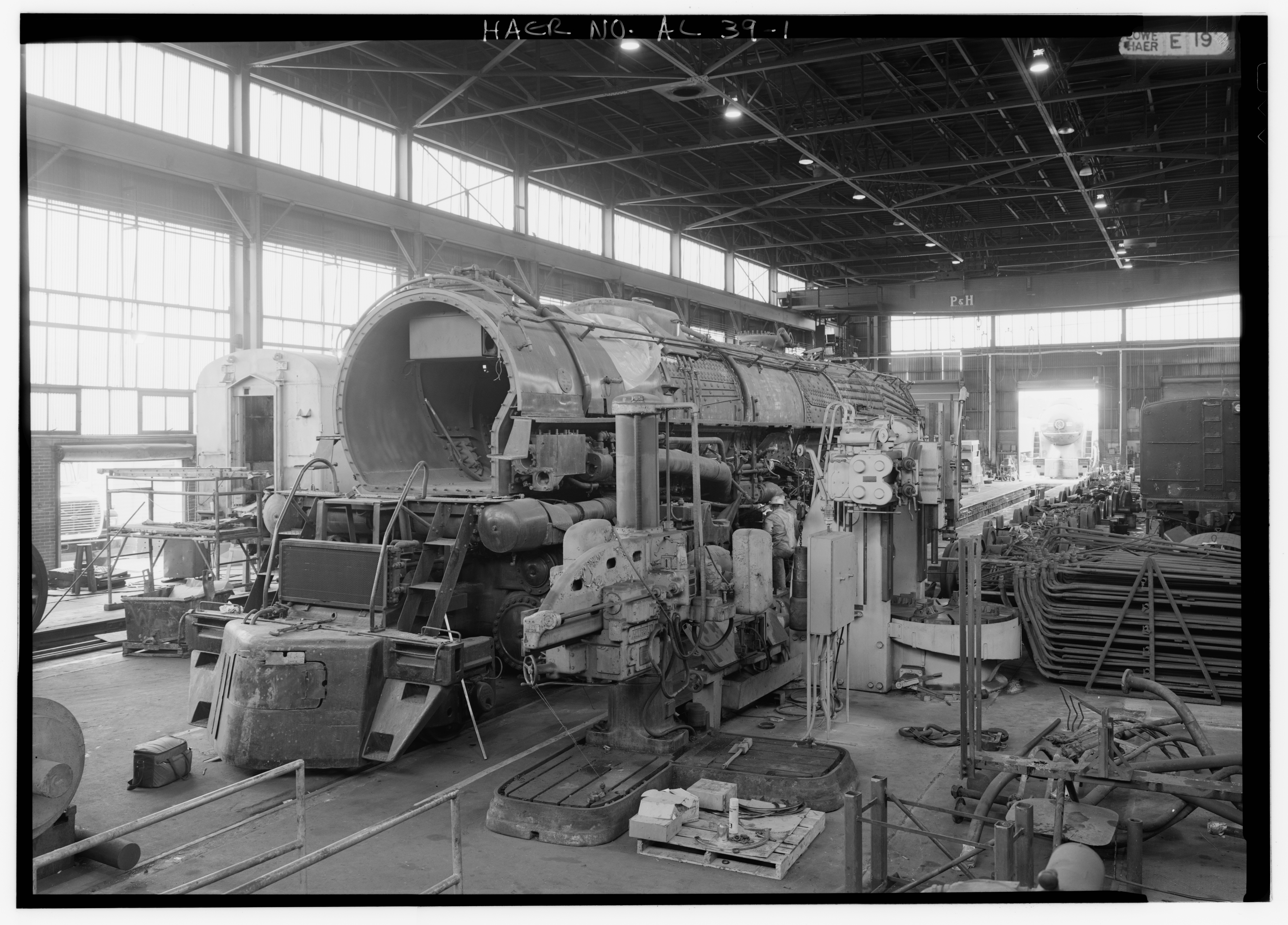
No. 1218 under overhaul at NS' Norris Yard Workshop in Irondale, Alabama, 1993

On November 8, No. 1218 hauled its very last excursion from Huntsville, Alabama to Chattanooga and return, sponsored by the North Alabama Railroad Club. Following the end of the 1991 excursion season, the locomotive returned to the Norris Yard Steam Shop for an extensive overhaul, since its flues needed to be replaced, large portions of its firebox sheets needed replacement, and two seams within the boiler barrel had developed leaks. No. 1218 was planned to return to service for the beginning of the 1996 excursion season. In late 1994, No. 1218's overhaul was halted, since NS chairman David R. Goode cancelled the steam program, following a yard switching accident involving nine passenger cars in Lynchburg. Goode cited serious safety concerns, rising insurance and maintenance costs for steam locomotives, decreasing spare network availability, and delayed freight traffic as the reasons for the cancellation. No. 611 would haul the last NS steam excursion on December 3, from Birmingham to Chattanooga and back.

In January 1996, No. 1218 was partially reassembled and towed back to Roanoke to be stored at the East End Shops. In 2000, the locomotive was moved out of the East End Shops and put on the turntable for a nighttime photoshoot, hosted by photographer O. Winston Link. Link wanted No. 1218 to be exhibited near the former N&W passenger station in downtown Roanoke, which was planned to be converted into a museum that displayed Link's N&W photographs.

"I was joined in line by Roanoke Chapter member Lawanda Ely. I commented that it was too bad Mr. O. Winston Link did not live to see this day. I said likewise for the Claytor brothers. Lawanda quickly corrected me on the second statement. If Robert Claytor were still alive, 1218 would be out on the high iron and the rest of us along with her. I couldn't agree more."

— Roanoke Chapter NRHS member and editor Robin R. Shavers during No. 1218's move to the Virginia Museum of Transportation in 2003

Link died on January 30, 2001, but plans for the museum were still carried on, and in June, Norfolk Southern agreed to donate No. 1218 to the City of Roanoke to honor Link's wishes. Preparations were subsequently made—including a cosmetic restoration by Norfolk Southern—to put the locomotive on display at the Virginia Museum of Transportation (VMT), formerly known as the Roanoke Transportation Museum. On June 11, 2003, during the 60th anniversary of No. 1218's 1943 construction date, the locomotive was pushed into place at the VMT's Robert B. Claytor and W. Graham Claytor Jr. Pavilion shed next to No. 611.

In 2007, Nos. 1218 and 611 were both temporarily put on display at the East End Shops to commemorate its 125th anniversary. On April 2, 2012, the City of Roanoke officially donated both to the VMT. No. 1218 continues to sit on display at the VMT, next to another former N&W steam locomotive, G-1 class No. 6, with No. 611 restored to operating condition. In May 2015, the N&W's Big Three trio was reunited, as No. 1218—and No. 611 outside of its excursion schedules—were paired with preserved Y6a class No. 2156, which was on loan from the Missouri-based National Museum of Transportation from 2015 to 2020. In July 2024, a mural featuring No. 1218 was painted by artist Jon Murrill at 108 Church Avenue SE in downtown Roanoke. The mural depicts No. 1218 along with various other local icons. On March 31, 2025, the VMT announced that No. 1218 was designated as a Virginia Historic Landmark, and on May 19, it became listed on the National Register of Historic Places (NRHP).

== See also ==
- Birmingham District
- Norfolk and Western 433
- Norfolk and Western 475
- Norfolk and Western 2050
- Texas and Pacific 610
- Western Maryland Scenic Railroad 1309

== Bibliography ==
- Jeffries, Lewis (2005). N&W: Giant of Steam, Revised Edition (2nd ed.). Norfolk and Western Historical Society, Inc. ISBN 0-9704794-5-X.
- Huddleston, Eugene (September 1987). "Today's Best Articulated?". Railfan & Railroad. Vol. 6, no. 11. Carstens Publications. pp. 34–45.
- Huddleston, Eugene L. (2001). World's Greatest Steam Locomotives: C&O 2-6-6-6, Virginian 2-6-6-6, N&W 2-6-6-4, UP 4-8-8-4 (1st ed.). TLC Publishing. ISBN 1-883089-60-3.
- McKinney, Wayne (2014). Roanoke Locomotive Shops and the Norfolk & Western Railroad. Images of Rails (1st ed.). Arcadia Publishing. ISBN 978-1-4671-2111-8.
- Withuhn, Bill (September 1987). "1218: Home to Roanoke". Trains. Vol. 47, no. 11. Kalmbach Publishing. pp. 26–33.
- Wrinn, Jim (2000). Steam's Camelot: Southern and Norfolk Southern Excursions in Color (1st ed.). TLC Publishing. ISBN 1-883089-56-5.
