= Norfolk and Western K2 and K2a classes =

Class of American locomotives, 1919, 1923

Type and origin
- Power type: Steam
- Builder: K2: American Locomotive Company (ALCO); K2a: Baldwin Locomotive Works (BLW)
- Build date: K2: May 1919; K2a: April–July 1923
- Total produced: K2: 10; K2a: 12
- Rebuilder: Norfolk and Western Railway
- Rebuild date: late 1940's
- Number rebuilt: 22
Specifications
- Configuration
  - Whyte: 4-8-2
- Gauge: 4 ft 8 1/2 in (1,435 mm) standard gauge
- Leading dia.: 36 in (914 mm)
- Driver dia.: 69 in (1,753 mm)
- Trailing dia.: 42 in (1,067 mm)
- Adhesive weight: 248,150 lb (112.6 tonnes)
- Loco weight: 359,460 lb (163.0 tonnes)
- Tender weight: 378,600 lb (171.7 tonnes)
- Total weight: 738,060 lb (334.8 tonnes)
- Fuel type: Coal
- Fuel capacity: 30 short tons (60,000 lb)
- Water cap.: 22,000 US gal (83,000 L; 18,000 imp gal)
- Boiler: 92 in (2,337 mm) (front); 102 in (2,591 mm) (back)
- Boiler pressure: 220 psi (1.52 MPa), formerly 200 psi (1.38 MPa)
- Feedwater heater: Worthington Type 4BL
- Superheater: Elesco Type A
- Cylinders: Two
- Cylinder size: 28 in × 30 in (711 mm × 762 mm)
- Valve gear: Baker
Performance figures
- Tractive effort: 63,800 lbf (283.80 kN), formerly 58,000 lbf (258.00 kN)
- Factor of adh.: 3.95
Career
- Operators: Norfolk and Western Railway
- Class: K2 and K2a
- Number in class: 22
- Numbers: K2: 116-125; K2a: 126-137
- Nicknames: J Juniors
- Retired: 1957-1959
- Disposition: All scrapped

The Norfolk and Western K2 and K2a classes were 4-8-2 "Mountain" steam locomotives built for the Norfolk and Western Railway (N&W).

== History ==
Ten K2s were built by American Locomotive Company (ALCO) in 1919 as part of the United States Railroad Administration (USRA) Heavy Mountain design. After being released from the USRA control, N&W ordered twelve similar-looking 4-8-2s from Baldwin Locomotive Works (BLW) in 1923. These new locomotives had incorporated parts design from the N&W, larger smokestack, and exhaust stand, which classified them as K2a.

In the late 1940s, these locomotives were rebuilt and streamlined in a similar fashion to that of the J class of 1941, earning them the nickname J Juniors. They also were fitted with roller bearings on all but the drivers, new fireboxes and stokers, and new cylinders. They were eventually retired and scrapped between 1957 and 1959 with none preserved.

== Bibliography ==
- Jeffries, Lewis (2005). N&W: Giant of Steam, Revised Edition (2nd ed.). Norfolk and Western Historical Society, Inc. ISBN 0-9704794-5-X.
