= Chesapeake and Ohio classes L-2 and L-2-A =

American steam locomotive class

C&O L-2
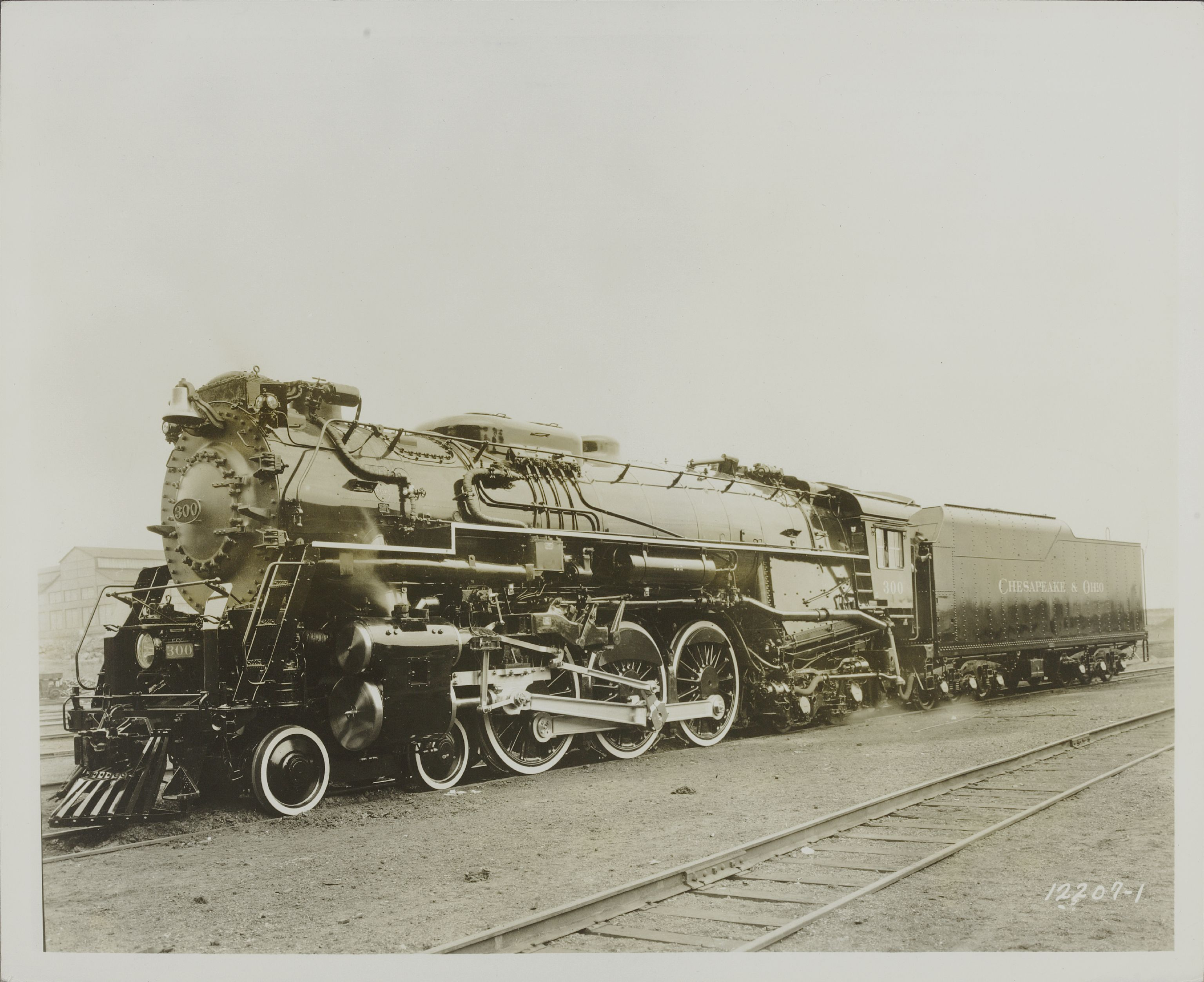
Type and origin
- Power type: Steam
- Builder: Baldwin Locomotive Works
- Build date: 1941
- Total produced: 8
Specifications
- Configuration
  - Whyte: 4-6-4
  - UIC: 2′C2′ h2
- Gauge: 4 ft 8 1/2 in (1,435 mm) standard gauge
- Driver dia.: 78 in (1.981 m)
- Length: 108 ft 0 in (32.92 m)
- Adhesive weight: 217,500 lb (98,700 kg; 98.7 t)
- Loco weight: 439,500 lb (199,400 kg; 199.4 t)
- Total weight: 832,500 lb (377,600 kg; 377.6 t)
- Fuel type: Coal
- Fuel capacity: 60,000 lb (27,000 kg; 27 t)
- Water cap.: 21,000 US gallons (79,000 L; 17,000 imp gal)
- Firebox
  - Grate area: 90 sq ft (8.4 m^{2})
- Boiler pressure: 255 psi (1.76 MPa)
- Heating surface: 4,233 sq ft (393.3 m^{2})
- Superheater
  - Heating area: 1,810 sq ft (168.2 m^{2})
- Cylinders: Two
- Cylinder size: 25 in × 30 in (635 mm × 762 mm)
Career
- Operators: Chesapeake and Ohio Railway
- Numbers: 300–307
- Retired: 1953
- Disposition: All scrapped

C&O L-2-A
Type and origin
- Only differences from L-2 above are shown
- Power type: Steam
- Builder: Baldwin Locomotive Works
- Build date: 1948
- Total produced: 5
Specifications
- Driver dia.: 78 in (1.981 m)
- Length: 108 ft 0 in (32.92 m)
- Adhesive weight: 219,500 lb (99,600 kg; 99.6 t)
- Loco weight: 443,000 lb (201,000 kg; 201 t)
- Total weight: 836,000 lb (379,000 kg; 379 t)
Career
- Operators: Chesapeake & Ohio Railway
- Numbers: 310–314
- Retired: 1955-1958
- Scrapped: 1959
- Disposition: All scrapped

The Chesapeake and Ohio Railway's class L-2 comprised eight coal-fired 4-6-4 "Hudson" type steam locomotives numbered 300–307 and built by the Baldwin Locomotive Works of Philadelphia, Pennsylvania in 1941. They had roller bearings on all axles, and the first-built, No. 300, also had roller bearings on its side and main rods. No. 300 bore "Elephant ear" smoke deflectors from 1948.

In 1947, the C&O ordered five additional and very similar locomotives, numbering them 310–314; these were class L-2-A and differed mostly in using Franklin RC poppet valves instead of the Baker valve gear of the L-2s. These were the last express passenger steam locomotives ordered by a United States railroad, and some of the most expensive at $353,346 each, 80% more than the cost of the 8 earlier L-2 locomotives.

Both classes were among the largest 4-6-4s ever built, and they were even more powerful than the C&O's L-1 class. The heaviest were the C&O's L2a class at 443,000 lbs, They were intended to work the C&O's top-flight express trains on level ground; the railroad purchased 4-8-4 "Greenbrier" types for mountain service.

By 1953, C&O passenger services were wholly dieselized, and there was no more work for these locomotives to do. Hudson locomotives were very unsuited to freight work, with such a comparatively small proportion of their weight on the drivers. All the L2’s and L2a’s were quickly scrapped by 1953.

== Notes ==
1. Huddleston, Eugene L. (Jan–Feb 2002). "The outstanding features and many lives of C&O 614". Chesapeake and Ohio Historical Magazine. Archived from the original on 2006-06-21.
