= USRA Heavy Mountain =

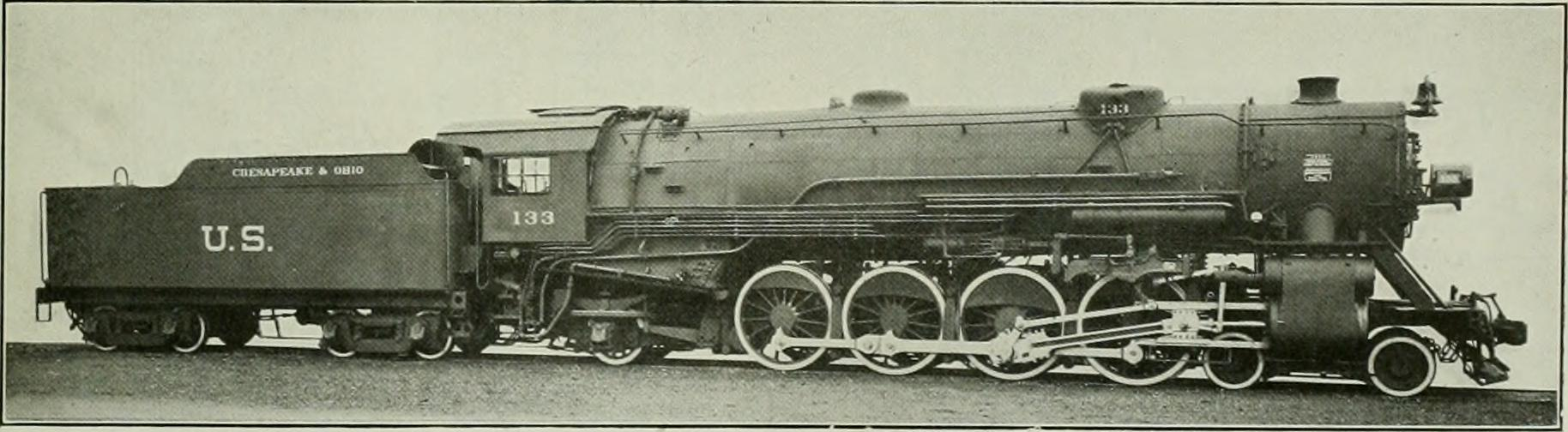
Type and origin
- Power type: Steam
- Builder: American Locomotive Company (13+25); Baldwin Locomotive Works (2+12)
- Build date: 1918-1926
- Total produced: 15 (plus 37 copies)
Specifications
- Configuration
  - Whyte: 4-8-2
  - UIC: 2′D1′ h2
- Gauge: 4 ft 8 1/2 in (1,435 mm)
- Wheelbase: Coupled: 18 ft 3 in (5.56 m); Locomotive: 40 ft 0 in (12.19 m); Loco & tender: 75 ft 8 1/2 in (23.08 m)
- Axle load: 60,000 lb (27,000 kg)
- Adhesive weight: 240,000 lb (110,000 kg)
- Loco weight: 350,000 lb (160,000 kg)
- Tender weight: 172,000 lb (78,000 kg)
- Total weight: 522,000 lb (237,000 kg)
- Fuel type: Coal
- Fuel capacity: 32,000 lb (15,000 kg)
- Water cap.: 10,000 US gal (38,000 L; 8,300 imp gal)
- Firebox
  - Grate area: 76.3 sq ft (7.09 m^{2})
- Boiler pressure: 200 psi (1.38 MPa)
- Heating surface
  - Firebox: 346 sq ft (32.1 m^{2})
  - Tubes: 2,790 sq ft (259 m^{2})
  - Flues: 1,323 sq ft (122.9 m^{2})
  - Total surface: 4,666 sq ft (433.5 m^{2})
- Superheater
  - Heating area: 10,780 sq ft (1,001 m^{2})
- Cylinders: Two
- Cylinder size: 28 in × 30 in (711 mm × 762 mm)
- Valve gear: Walschaerts
- Valve type: 14-inch (360 mm) piston valves
Performance figures
- Tractive effort: 58,200 lbf (258.89 kN)
- Factor of adh.: 4.1
Career
- Preserved: 0
- Scrapped: 1940-1959
- Disposition: All scrapped

The USRA Heavy Mountain was a USRA standard class of steam locomotive designed under the control of the United States Railroad Administration, the nationalized railroad system in the United States during World War I. This was the standard heavy freight locomotive of the USRA types, and was of 4-8-2 wheel arrangement in the Whyte notation, or 2′D1′ in UIC classification.

A total of 15 locomotives were built under the auspices of the USRA.

Table of original USRA allocation
Railroad	Quantity	Class	Road numbers	Notes
Chesapeake and Ohio Railway	5	J-2	543-547	Built 1918 by Baldwin. Renumbered from 133-137. Scrapped 1940-1947.
Norfolk and Western Railway	10	K2	116–125	Built 1919 by ALCO. Scrapped 1951-1952.
Total	15			

Table of copies acquired
Railroad	Quantity	Class	Road numbers	Notes
Chesapeake and Ohio Railway	2	J-2a	548–549	Built 1923 by ALCO. Renumbered from 138-139. Scrapped in 1948.
Florida East Coast Railway	23	801	801–823	Built 1926 by ALCO Schenectady. Scrapped 1950-1952.
Norfolk and Western Railway	12	K2a	126–137	Built 1923 by Baldwin. Scrapped 1947-1959.
Total	37			

Neither the originals built by the USRA or any of the subsequent copies were preserved, being scrapped between 1940 and 1959.
