= 2-6-6-4 =

Articulated locomotive wheel arrangement

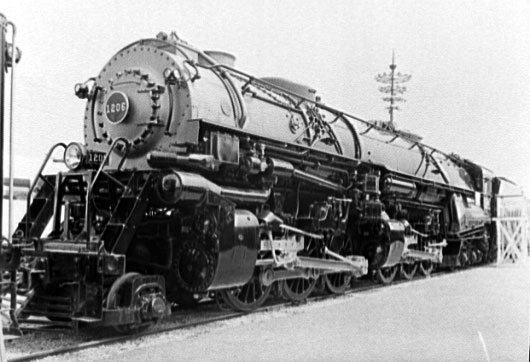
Norfolk & Western A class No. 1206 displayed at the New York World's Fair in 1939.

In the Whyte notation for the classification of steam locomotive wheel arrangement, a 2-6-6-4 is a locomotive with a two-wheel leading truck, two sets of six driving wheels, and a four-wheel trailing truck. All 2-6-6-4s are simple articulated locomotives.

Other equivalent classifications are:

- UIC classification: (1'C)C2' (also known as German classification and Italian classification)
- French classification: 130+032
- Turkish classification: 34+35
- Swiss classification: 3/4+3/5

The UIC classification is refined to (1'C)C2' for simple articulated locomotives.

The 2-6-6-4 was a fairly late development, a product of the superpower steam concept, introduced by the Lima Locomotive Works, which encouraged the use of large fireboxes supported by four-wheel trailing trucks. Such a firebox could sustain a rate of steam generation to meet any demands of the locomotive's cylinders, even at high speed. High speeds were certainly among the design goals for the 2-6-6-4; most of the type were intended for use on fast freight trains.

The first 2-6-6-4s built in the United States were for the Pittsburgh and West Virginia Railway, and these were not high-speed locomotives but rather mountain engines. They received three in 1934 and four more in 1937 and operated the 2-6-6-4s until 1953.

The next of the type was a class of ten ordered by the Seaboard Air Line in 1935 and 1937. These were high-speed freight engines and very successful. Upon dieselization the class was sold to the Baltimore and Ohio Railroad in 1947, who operated them until 1953.

The final class of 2-6-6-4s was the Norfolk and Western Railway's A class, built starting in 1936. 43 were built until 1950 but were operated until 1959 to prepare the ending of steam power. The powerful 2-6-6-4s were capable of more than 5,000 drawbar horsepower at 45 mph (72 km/h) and could reach 70 mph (110 km/h), while pulling heavy coal trains. They were used until dieselization in 1959.

In all, sixty 2-6-6-4s were constructed in North America. Only one remains: Norfolk and Western 1218 was preserved and in 1987 was restored to running order, running on excursions until 1991. Today it is on display at the Virginia Museum of Transportation.
