= Chesapeake and Ohio Greenbrier =

Class of 12 American 4-8-4 locomotives

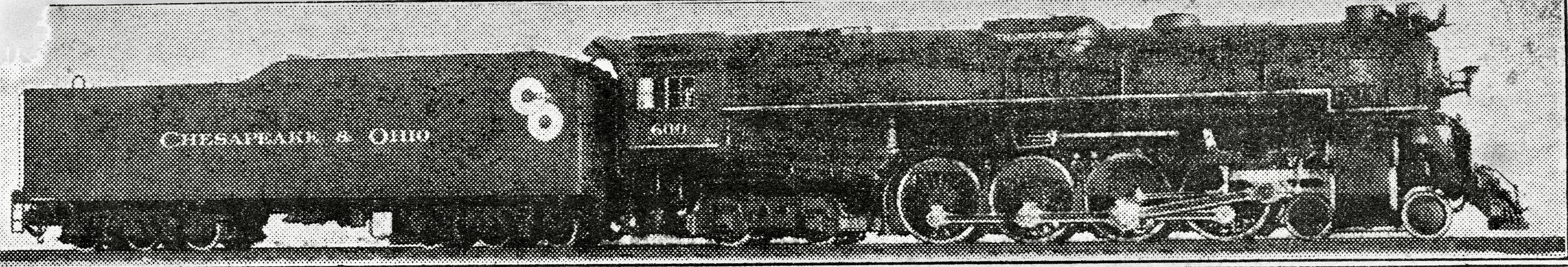
- C&O No. 600, the first J-3 Greenbrier
Type and origin
- Power type: Steam
- Builder: Lima Locomotive Works
- Order number: 1131, 1156, 1201
- Serial number: 7627-7631, 7842-7843, 9302-9306
- Build date: 1935-1948
- Total produced: 12
Specifications
- Configuration
  - Whyte: 4-8-4
  - UIC: 2′D2′ h2
- Gauge: 4 ft 8 1/2 in (1,435 mm) standard gauge
- Leading dia.: J-3: 36 in (914 mm); J-3a: 38 in (965 mm)
- Driver dia.: J-3: 72 in (1,829 mm); J-3a: 74 in (1,880 mm)
- Trailing dia.: J-3: 36 in (914 mm); J-3a: 42 in (1,067 mm) (44 in (1,118 mm) on last axle)
- Tender wheels: 36 in (914 mm)
- Minimum curve: 20°
- Length
  - Over couplers: 112 ft 2 3/4 in (34.21 m)
- Height: 15 ft 8 7/8 in (4.80 m)
- Axle load: J-3 (Nos. 600-604): 69,700 lb (31,600 kilograms; 31.6 metric tons); J-3 (Nos. 605-606): 73,200 lb (33,200 kilograms; 33.2 metric tons); J-3a: 71,700 lb (32,500 kilograms; 32.5 metric tons)
- Adhesive weight: J-3 (Nos. 600-604): 273,000 lb (124,000 kilograms; 124 metric tons); J-3 (Nos. 605-606): 292,800 lb (132,800 kilograms; 132.8 metric tons); J-3a: 282,400 lb (128,100 kilograms; 128.1 metric tons)
- Loco weight: J-3 (Nos. 600-604): 477,000 lb (216,000 kilograms; 216 metric tons); J-3 (Nos. 605-606): 506,300 lb (229,700 kilograms; 229.7 metric tons); J-3a: 479,400 lb (217,500 kilograms; 217.5 metric tons)
- Tender weight: J-3 (Nos. 600-604): 381,700 lb (173,100 kilograms; 173.1 metric tons); J-3 (Nos. 605-606): 388,020 lb (176,000 kilograms; 176.00 metric tons); J-3a: 386,130 lb (175,150 kilograms; 175.15 metric tons)
- Total weight: J-3 (Nos. 600-604): 858,700 lb (389,500 kilograms; 389.5 metric tons); J-3 (Nos. 605-606): 894,320 lb (405,660 kilograms; 405.66 metric tons); J-3a: 865,530 lb (392,600 kilograms; 392.60 metric tons)
- Fuel type: Coal
- Fuel capacity: 50,000 lb (23,000 kilograms; 23 metric tons)
- Water cap.: J-3: 22,000 US gal (83,000 L; 18,000 imp gal); J-3a: 21,500 US gal (81,000 L; 17,900 imp gal)
- Firebox
  - Grate area: J-3: 100 sq ft (9.3 m^{2}); J-3a: 100.3 sq ft (9.32 m^{2})
- Boiler
  - Diameter: 100 in (2,540 mm)
  - Small tubes: J-3 (Nos. 600-604): 65 - 2 1/2 in (64 mm); J-3 (Nos. 605-606) and J-3a: 22 - 2 1/4 in (57 mm)
  - Large tubes: 220 - 3 1/2 in (89 mm)
- Boiler pressure: J-3 (Nos. 600-604): 250 psi (1.72 MPa); J-3 (Nos. 605-606) and J-3a: 255 psi (1.76 MPa)
- Feedwater heater: J-3: Worthington 5-S; J-3a: Hancock TA-1
- Heating surface
  - Firebox: J-3 (Nos. 600-604) and J-3a: 150 1/16 in × 96 1/4 in (3,812 mm × 2,445 mm); J-3 (Nos. 605-606): 150 in × 96 1/4 in (3,810 mm × 2,440 mm)
  - Total surface: J-3: 7,880 sq ft (732 m^{2}); J-3a: 6,879 sq ft (639.1 m^{2})
- Superheater
  - Type: Type E
  - Heating area: J-3: 2,342 sq ft (217.6 m^{2}); J-3a: 2,058 sq ft (191.2 m^{2})
- Cylinders: Two
- Cylinder size: 27 1/2 in × 30 in (698 mm × 762 mm)
- Valve gear: J-3 (Nos. 600-604): Walschaert; J-3 (Nos. 605-606) and J-3a: Baker
Performance figures
- Maximum speed: 100 mph (160 km/h)
- Power output: 3,468 hp (2,590 kW; 3,520 PS)
- Tractive effort: J-3 (Nos. 600-604): 66,960 lbf (297.85 kN) (With Booster: 81,035 lbf (360.46 kN)); J-3 (Nos. 605-606): 66,450 lbf (295.58 kN) (With Booster: 80,805 lbf (359.44 kN)); J-3a: 66,450 lbf (295.58 kN) (With Booster: 78,850 lbf (350.74 kN))
- Factor of adh.: J-3 (Nos. 600-604): 4.184.41; J-3 (Nos. 605-606): 4.25; J-3a: 4.44
Career
- Operators: Chesapeake and Ohio Railway
- Class: J-3; J-3a
- Numbers: 600-606, 610-614
- Retired: J-3: 1952; J-3a: 1955-1956
- Disposition: One J-3a (614) preserved, remainder scrapped.

The Chesapeake and Ohio Greenbrier was a class of twelve 4-8-4 steam locomotives built by the Lima Locomotive Works between 1935 and 1948 and operated by the Chesapeake and Ohio Railway (C&O). The C&O did not name their 4-8-4s "Northerns", and instead chosen the name "Greenbrier" after the Greenbrier Hotel in White Sulphur Springs, West Virginia, which was owned by the C&O, and served as a major destination on the C&O mainline.

They were built with the primary purpose of hauling heavy express passenger trains for the C&O Railway, such as the George Washington and the Fast Flying Virginian. All retired by the mid 1950s, only No. 614 is preserved, and it is undergoing restoration to operating condition.

== History ==
Built in three batches, all 12 of the Greenbriers were built for mountain passenger service, hauling trains such as the "George Washington" or the "Sportsman". They also saw service pulling freight and occasionally in pusher service for eastbound coal trains when necessary. The overall design was largely the same between the three batches, although there were changes between each batch.

=== First batch ===
The first batch consisted of five "Greenbriers" (600-604) built in 1935 and named Virginia statesmen Thomas Jefferson, Patrick Henry, Benjamin Harrison, James Madison and Edmund Randolph. These first five were classified as J-3. They were delivered with spoked driving wheels and worked at a boiler pressure of 250 PSI, which was later raised to 255 PSI. The 1935 J-3s were the only "Greenbriers" built with Walschaerts valve gear, which was later changed to Baker, and were equipped with feedwater heaters and thermic siphons, arch tubes, and a combustion chamber in the firebox.

=== Second batch ===
Only two locomotives were part of a second batch in 1942, numbered 605-606. These were also classified as J-3 but referred to by some accounts as "J-3b." Like their predecessors, they were given the names of Virginia statesmen: Thomas Nelson, Jr and James Monroe. They also used the same trailing truck boosters, feedwater heaters, and arrangement of thermic siphons, arch tubes, and combustion chamber as the 1935 J-3s. Nonetheless, there were several changes from the original design. The 1942 J-3 pair were built new with Baker valve gear and saw the steam and sand domes change positions. They also worked at a slightly higher boiler pressure of 255 PSI from delivery, had three more superheater flues in the boiler, and used roller bearings on the lead and trailing trucks. The 1942 pair were heavier than the 1935 locomotives as well, presumably due to the use of heavier metals in construction than the lightweight alloys often used before the start of World War II.

=== Third batch ===
The final batch of "Greenbriers" were numbered 610-614 and were built in 1948 and classified as J-3a. These locomotives were unnamed and saw many changes to the original design. Boxpok driving wheels, which offered better counterbalancing, were used in place of spoked wheels, and cast steel frame beds were used instead of bar frames for structural integrity. Timken roller bearings were used on the axles and running gear to reduce maintenance, and a different model of feedwater heater was fitted. No. 613 was also equipped with experimental smoke deflectors. Despite having a smaller heating surface than the earlier J-3s, the J-3as had firebox circulators, a larger combustion chamber, and larger-diameter flues in the boiler to improving steaming capacity. They were also fitted with a cast steel, streamlined pilot. These locomotives were the last 4-8-4s built by Lima and were the last commercially built 4-8-4s in the United States.

== Preservation ==
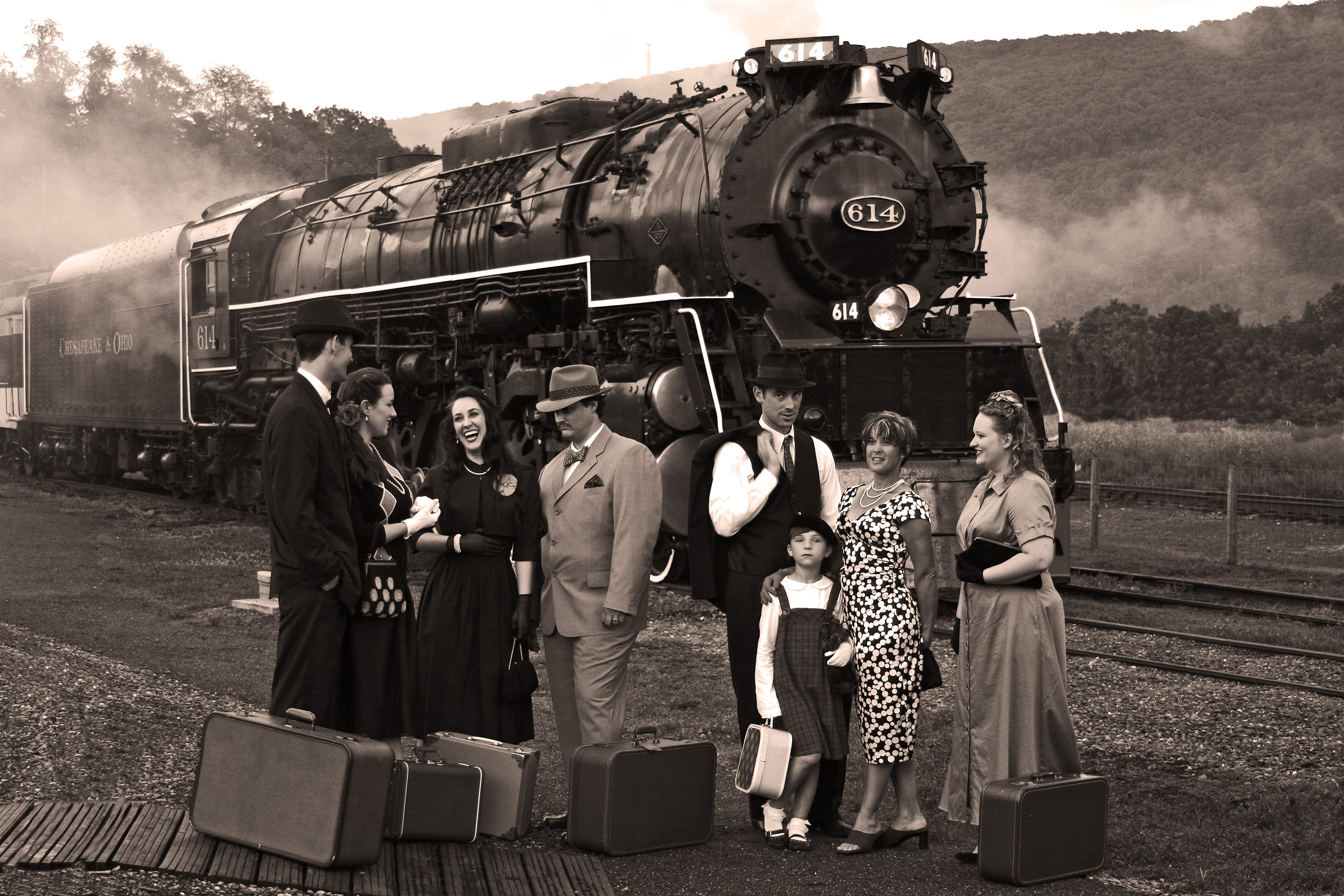
Preserved C&O Greenbrier No. 614 during a photoshoot at the C&O Railway Heritage Center in Clifton Forge, Virginia

Only one "Greenbrier" has survived into preservation, No. 614. 614 ran in a number of excursions, starting with the Chessie Safety Express in the early 1980s and ending pulling excursions in conjunction with New Jersey Transit (NJT) and co-sponsored by the Volunteer Railroaders Association between 1996 and 1998. No. 614 was also used as a test locomotive for the ACE 3000 project, hauling coal trains between Huntington and Hinton, West Virginia in 1985 and "T" was added next to her number to indicate testing. During 614's excursion career, her tender was modified, reducing its water capacity from 21,500 gallons to 18,200 gallons, but increased its coal capacity from 23 metric tons to 45 metric tons. To compensate the reduced water capacity, an auxiliary tender was given to 614, increasing her overall water capacity to 50,000 gallons, these changes increased distance traveled with fewer coal and water stops. For many years, 614 was on display at the C&O Railway Heritage Center in Clifton Forge, Virginia in the Greenbrier Presidential Express scheme, a luxury passenger train which never came to be.

On November 8, 2024, it was announced that C&O 614 was sold by Ross Rowland to RJD America, LLC of Denville, New Jersey, who will be restoring it to operating condition. The locomotive has been moved to the Strasburg Railroad in June 2025, who has been contracted to complete the restoration.

== Roster ==
C&O Greenbrier locomotive numbers and details
| Nos. | Lima serial number | Names | Build date | Disposition |
|---|---|---|---|---|
| 600 | 7627 | Thomas Jefferson | 1935 | Sold for scrap April 1953 |
| 601 | 7628 | Patrick Henry | 1935 | Sold for scrap April 1953 |
| 602 | 7629 | Benjamin Harrison | 1935 | Sold for scrap July 1953 |
| 603 | 7630 | James Madison | 1935 | Sold for scrap April 1953 |
| 604 | 7631 | Edmund Randolph | 1935 | Sold for scrap July 1953 |
| 605 | 7842 | Thomas Nelson Jr. | 1942 | Scrapped 1953 |
| 606 | 7843 | James Monroe | 1942 | Scrapped 1953 |
| 610 | 9302 | | 1948 | Scrapped 1957 |
| 611 | 9303 | | 1948 | Scrapped 1955 |
| 612 | 9304 | | 1948 | Scrapped 1956 |
| 613 | 9305 | | 1948 | Scrapped 1956 |
| 614 | 9306 | | 1948 | Undergoing restoration at the Strasburg Rail Road in Strasburg, Pennsylvania |
