= Powhatan Arrow =

Flagship passenger train operated in the United States

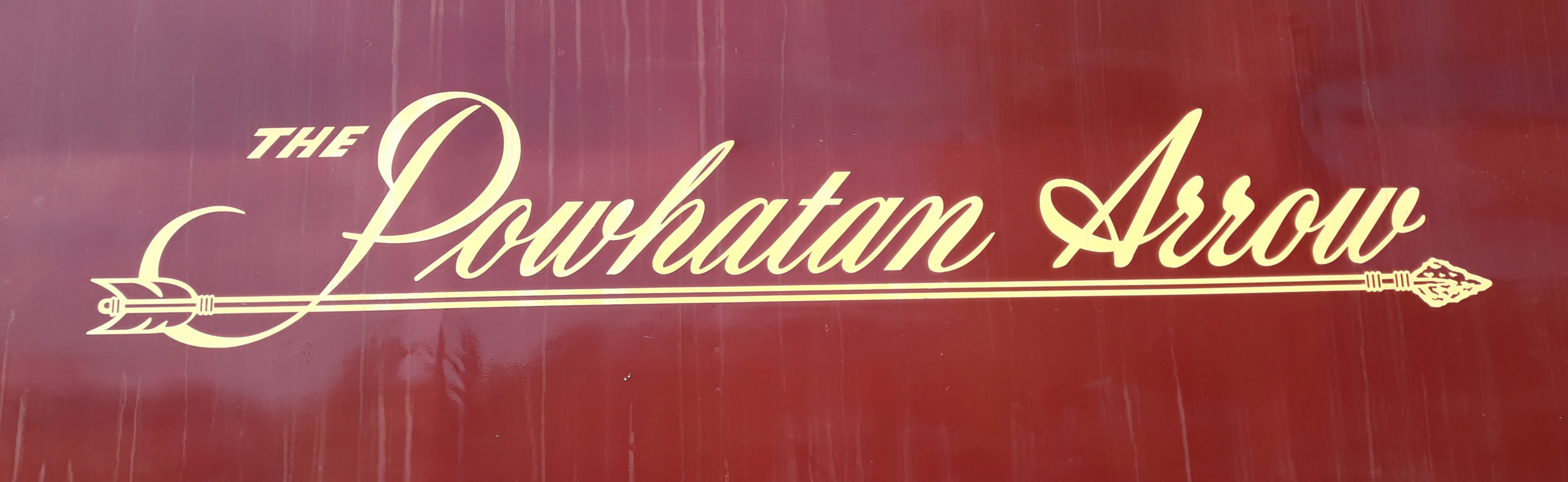

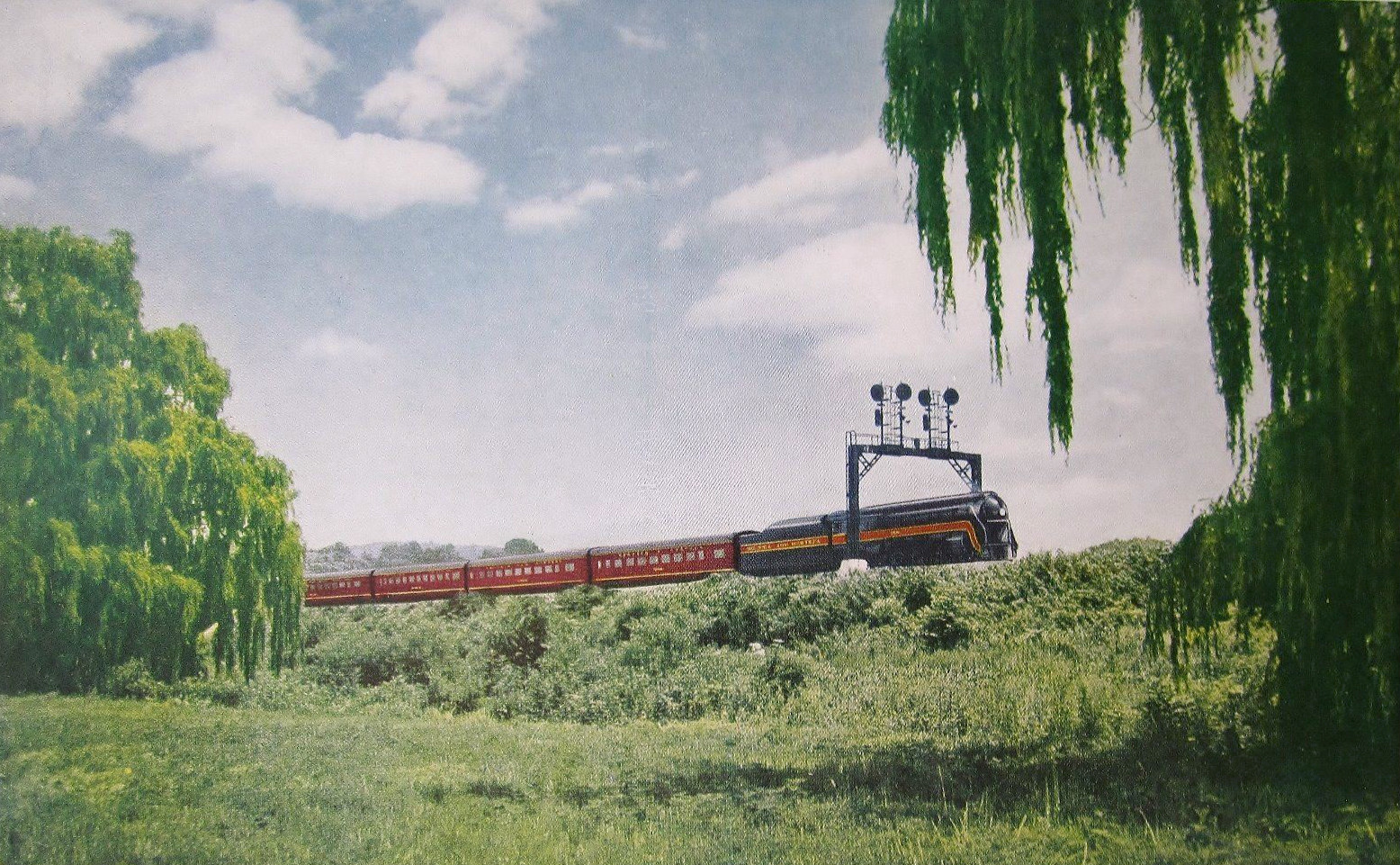
- A postcard photo of the Powhatan Arrow

Overview
- Service type: Inter-city rail
- Status: Discontinued
- Locale: Mid-Atlantic and Midwestern United States
- First service: April 28, 1946; 80 years ago
- Last service: May 23, 1969; 57 years ago
- Former operator: Norfolk and Western

Route
- Termini: Norfolk, Virginia; Cincinnati, Ohio
- Stops: Petersburg, Virginia; Crewe, Virginia; Lynchburg, Virginia; Roanoke, Virginia; Bluefield, West Virginia; Williamson, West Virginia; Kenova, West Virginia; Portsmouth, Ohio
- Distance travelled: 676 miles (1,088 km)
- Average journey time: 15 hours and 45 minutes
- Service frequency: Daily
- Train numbers: 25, 15-25 (westbound); 26, 16-26 (eastbound)

On-board services
- Seating arrangements: Reclining seat coaches
- Catering facilities: Dining-lounge car

Technical
- Track gauge: 4 ft 8 1/2 in (1,435 mm) standard gauge
- Operating speed: 20–60 mph (32–97 km/h)

The Powhatan Arrow (or the Arrow for short) was a named flagship passenger train operated by the Norfolk and Western Railway (N&W) in the United States. Debuting on April 28, 1946, the daily westbound No. 25 and the eastbound No. 26 connected Norfolk, Virginia, and Cincinnati, Ohio, covering 676 miles (1,088 km) in about 15 hours and 45 minutes behind streamlined 4-8-4 class J steam locomotives. In late 1949, the N&W re-equipped the Powhatan Arrow consist with new lightweight passenger cars, dining cars, and observation cars from the Pullman-Standard Company. It was advertised as the "most beautiful train in the east."

Over the next decade, the Powhatan Arrow trains changed drastically: railway post office (RPO) cars were added, dining cars were converted to diner-lounge types, observation cars were eliminated, and the class J locomotives were replaced with Electro-Motive Diesel (EMD) E-units leased from the Atlantic Coast Line (ACL) and Richmond, Fredericksburg and Potomac (RF&P) railroads. These diesels themselves were replaced by the N&W's new EMD GP9s towards the end of 1958. N&W passenger traffic declined over the following decade, and the Powhatan Arrow made its last run on May 23, 1969.

== History ==
=== Background and inauguration ===
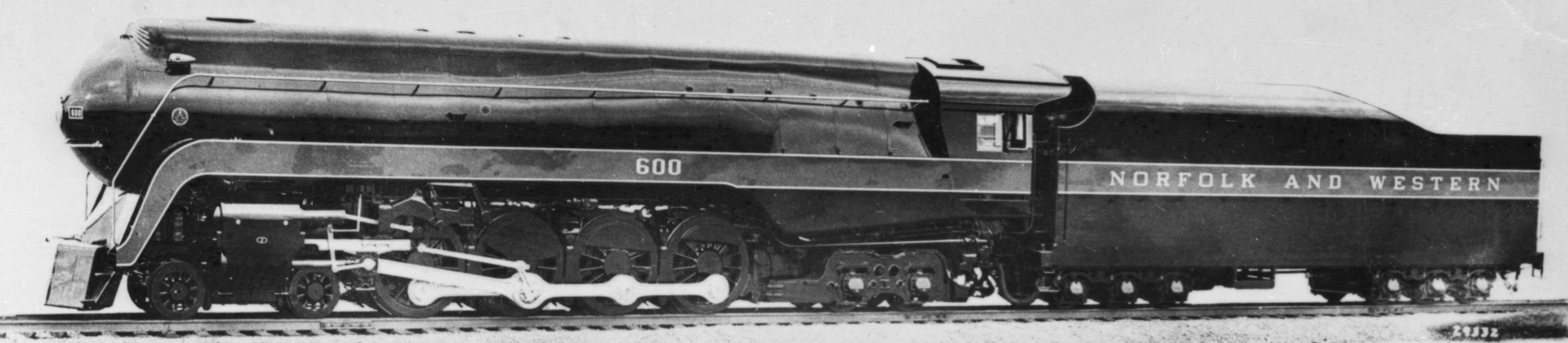
No. 600, the first of the class J locomotives that hauled the Powhatan Arrow from 1946 to 1958

During the 1920s, the Norfolk and Western Railway (N&W) operated two crack passenger trains: the Pocahontas and Cavalier, which ran on the N&W's 676-mile (1,088 km) mainline between Norfolk, Virginia and Cincinnati, Ohio; via Roanoke, Virginia. Amid the Great Depression of the 1930s, N&W leaders sought to offset declining ridership revenue by modernizing their passenger trains with streamlined designs. The N&W built the first batch of five streamlined 4-8-4 class J steam locomotives, Nos. 600-604, at their Roanoke Shops, then ordered 15 streamlined Pm-class coaches, Nos. 1720-1734, from the Pullman-Standard Company to re-equip their Pocahontas and Cavalier consists in late 1941 and early 1942. The Pm-class coaches had 60 reclining seats. In 1943, the second batch of six class J locomotives, Nos. 605-610, were built without streamlined casings due to wartime restrictions; initially classified as J1s, they were fitted with the casing a year later and reclassified as Js.

After World War II, N&W president Robert H. Smith and other executives were determined to keep passengers riding. On April 28, 1946, the railroad launched the Powhatan Arrow, a luxurious passenger train that ran between Norfolk and Cincinnati daily. The train was named after Powahatan, the head of the Powhatan Confederacy, and the name was chosen by former N&W employee Leonard A. Scott of Dry Branch, Virginia, who won the $500 first prize in an N&W naming contest. Drawn by a class J locomotive, the six-car trains included five Pm-class coaches and a re-equipped De-class dining car—all painted in Tuscan red with golden yellow stripes and letterings. The Powhatan Arrow was advertised as the N&W's flagship passenger train and, despite its reuse of older equipment, as one of America's first new postwar streamliners.

On November 24, 1946, the N&W suspended the Powhatan Arrow and their other passenger train services to comply with an order by the federal Office of Defense Transportation, which told railroads to temporarily cease use of 25% of their steam locomotives to alleviate a severe shortage of coal caused by a massive coal miners' strike. On December 7, the order was lifted and the Powhatan Arrow services resumed operations.

In June 1947, the Powhatan Arrow consist was given additional tavern-lounge cars, which were rebuilds of the Pm-class coaches Nos. 1720-1722. These cars were equipped with N&W-built mahogany furniture, ashtrays cast at the Roanoke Shops' foundry, and formica counter tops and tables.

=== Services and connections ===
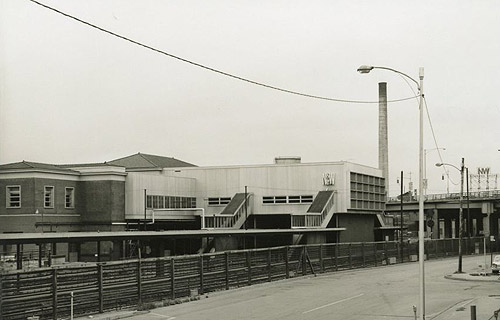
The abandoned Roanoke station served by the Powhatan Arrow, in September 1972

The Powhatan Arrow had two trains. No. 25 departed from Norfolk Terminal Station at 7:30 a.m.; made station stops in Virginia (Petersburg, Crewe, Lynchburg, and Roanoke) and West Virginia (Bluefield and Williamson) along with Portsmouth, Ohio; and terminated at Cincinnati Union Terminal at 11:15 p.m. There were also two request stops at Christiansburg, Virginia, and Ironton, Ohio; the former to discharge passengers from beyond Roanoke and receive for Cincinnati; the latter to discharge passengers from Bluefield and beyond for No. 25. No. 26 departed from Cincinnati at 8:20 a.m. and arrived at Norfolk at 11:55 p.m., with the Christiansburg and Ironton stops reversed. Both trains ran 15 hours and 45 minutes per day at an average speed of about 45 mph (72 km/h).

At Petersburg, trains connected to Richmond, Virginia, via Atlantic Coast Line (ACL); at Lynchburg, to Durham, North Carolina; at Roanoke, to Winston-Salem, North Carolina, and to the Southern Railway's (SOU) Birmingham Special and Tennessean passenger trains. Cincinnati offered connecting trains to Chicago, Illinois (via New York Central (NYC) or Pennsylvania Railroad (PRR)); St. Louis, Missouri (via NYC or Baltimore and Ohio (B&O)); and Detroit, Michigan (via B&O).

By early 1948, Christiansburg and Ironton became normal stops; on July 14, a new request stop was added at Pearisburg, Virginia, enabling connections to Kenova, West Virginia, and beyond. On June 19, 1949, the departure time for No. 25 at Norfolk was backed up to 7 a.m. In 1950, Cincinnati added connections to Louisville, Kentucky; Memphis, and Nashville, Tennessee, via the Louisville and Nashville Railroad (L&N). In July 1951, No. 26's running time was extended 15 minutes east of Roanoke with a new arrival time at 11:40 p.m. in Norfolk. By early 1955, No. 26's departure time in Cincinnati was changed to 8:10 a.m., while its arrival time at Norfolk was 11:25 p.m. Additionally, the connecting services to Durham were discontinued and the Powhatan Arrow was given flag stops, covering six stations between Williamson and Kenova, and 13 between Portsmouth and Cincinnati. Within a year later, most of the stops west of Portsmouth were rearranged for No. 25 to discharge passengers and No. 26 to receive them.

=== Rolling stock re-equipment ===
"It is without doubt the most beautiful train in the east today and one of the most thrilling things on the rails anywhere."

— The Roanoke World-News on the re-equipped Powhatan Arrow

In April 1946, the month of the Powhatan Arrow's debut, N&W ordered 18 new passenger cars for the train from Pullman-Standard for more than $2 million. The car company promised delivery in the second quarter of 1947, but missed the deadline by nearly two and a half years while it completed orders for other railroads. N&W finally received the fleet on November 22, 1949: two P1-class locker coaches Nos. 501-502, two P2-class divided coaches Nos. 511-512, 10 P3-class straight coaches Nos. 531-540, two D1-class dining cars Nos. 491-492, and two P4-class tavern-lounge-observation cars Nos. 581-582. All of them had the Powhatan Arrow logo inscribed on their sides. (Note: Plans to build two dome cars for train had been cancelled because the domes might have struck the overhead cables on N&W's electrified lines.) N&W also had two other D1 class dining cars, Nos. 493-494, named General William Mahone and Frederick J. Kimball, respectively. They were delivered a month prior for primary usage on the Pocahontas and relief duty on the Powhatan Arrow.

The new Powhatan Arrow consist has six or seven cars: one P1 locker coach, one P2 divided coach, two or three P3 straight coaches, one D1 diner, and a D4 lounge-tavern-observation car. This freed up the Pm-class coaches for the Cavalier and Pocahontas trains. On November 30, 1949, the re-equipped train was sent on a publicity tour, pulled by class J No. 609 to various stations between Roanoke and Bluefield. On December 4–11, the train did an exhibition tour to various stations along the N&W mainline. The re-equipped train's first revenue runs took place on December 12.

In the summer of 1950, N&W built three more class J locomotives, Nos. 611-613, the final mainline passenger steam locomotives built in the United States. By 1953, the No. 25 train had nosed out the New York Central's James Whitcomb Riley train as the third-fastest American long-distance run, maintaining an average speed of 65.4 mph (105 km/h) on the N&W main line, running 58.9 miles (94.8 km) between Suffolk and Petersburg, Virginia.

=== Drastic changes, downgrades, and discontinuation ===
In 1955, the N&W sought to reduce the Powhatan Arrow's operating costs in the face of declining ridership by shortening the trains to just five cars: removing two P3 straight coaches and replacing the P1 locker coaches with combine cars that also handled a small amount of mail business. Occasionally, the consist was given additional mail storage cars in case if there was any extra mail business. In early 1958, the N&W removed the P4 observation cars, converted the D1 dining cars into diner-lounge types, and added a railway post office car to accommodate even more mail business.

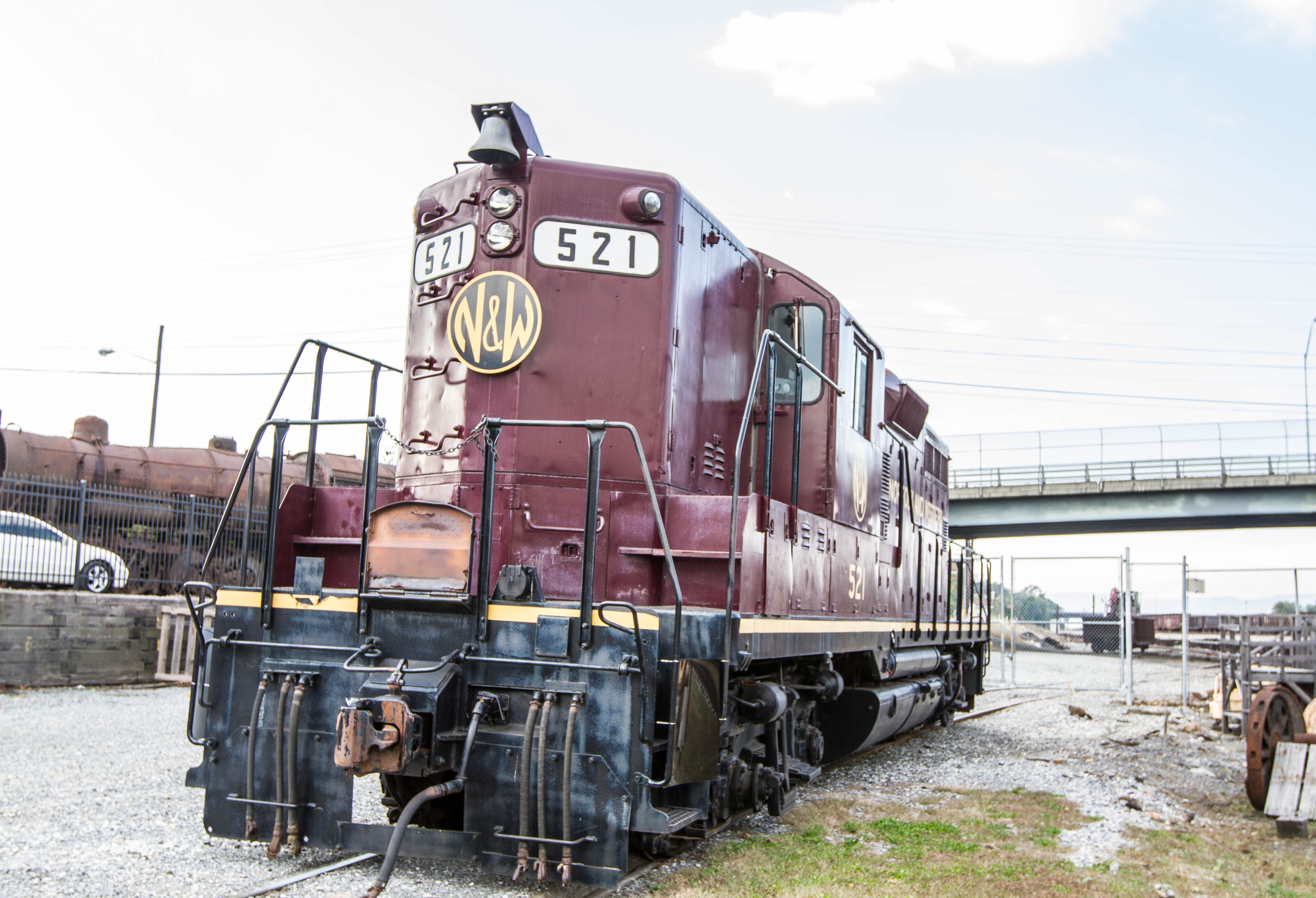
No. 521, one of the GP9s used on the Powhatan Arrow during 1958 to 1969, on display at the VMT in October 2016

On April 1, 1958, the N&W's new president, Stuart T. Saunders, launched his plan to dieselize the railroad. He demoted the class J steam locomotives that had drawn the Powhatan Arrow to freight service; J class No. 610 hauled the last steam-powered Powhatan Arrow train on July 17, 1958. The Js were replaced at the head of the Powhatan Arrow with an EMD E6A (No. 512) and seven EMD E7A units (Nos. 524, 530, 531, 533, and 549-551) leased from the Atlantic Coast Line (ACL) and four EMD E8A units (Nos. 1012-1015) leased from the Richmond, Fredericksburg and Potomac (RF&P). Additionally, the E-units were re-lettered with NORFOLK & WESTERN letterings, but still retained their respective railroads' paint schemes. That year brought more changes: the connections with the Birmingham Special and Tennessean were no longer advertised on the Powhatan Arrow timetables, and in October, train No. 26's arrival time at Norfolk was pushed past midnight. In late 1958, some of the class J locomotives briefly returned to passenger service, including the Powhatan Arrow, when the ACL recalled its E-units to handle heavy winter traffic in Florida.

By the end of 1958, the N&W's new diesel locomotives, EMD GP9s, arrived to serve as the main motive powers of the Powhatan Arrow trains and the class Js returned to freight service until they were all retired around 1959. It was around that time that the connection to Richmond was discontinued and the passengers, disembarking at Petersburg, were advised to take the Greyhound bus. The leased E8A units returned to the RF&P in February 1959.

In April 1963, train No. 25's departure time from Norfolk was set back to 6:10 a.m. with checked baggage service stops between Bluefield and Cincinnati, giving train No. 25's running time now set to 16 hours and 25 minutes. In July 1964, the lounge-diner was cut back between Roanoke and Portsmouth, Ohio. Additionally, the time schedule of Nos. 25 and 26 leaving from and arriving in Norfolk, was changed to 5:30 a.m. and 1:30 a.m., respectively. In 1966, the Powhatan Arrow's cars were repainted in a new acrylic blue paint scheme under the influence of ex-Wabash Railroad (WAB) president and the N&W's next president, Herman H. Pevler. Additionally, the Powhatan Arrow consist was finally given dome cars, which were originally used on WAB's Banner Blue and Blue Bird passenger trains when the WAB merged with the N&W two years prior.

On April 30, 1967, the Cavalier combined with the Powhatan Arrow, changing the latter's trains' numbers from Nos. 25 and 26 to Nos. 15-25 and 16-26, respectively. Additionally, the Powhatan Arrow's schedule was drastically changed to an overnight run with No. 15-25 departing Norfolk at 10:05 p.m. and No. 16-26 arriving in Norfolk at 4:45 a.m. On October 28, 1967, the Powhatan Arrow ran its last RPO operations with the U.S. Post Office. In April 1968, the Railway Express Agency discontinued their service with the Powhatan Arrow. This would leave the mail storage car being the only head-end business remaining on the Powhatan Arrow. In December of that same year, the Powhatan Arrow's dining cars were now operated between Roanoke and Clare Yard in Mariemont, Ohio on train No. 15-25, and 14 miles east of Cincinnati on train No. 16-26.

Due to competition with airlines and road vehicles, passenger ridership on every railroads, including the N&W, started to decrease. On April 26, 1969, N&W filed a petition with the Interstate Commerce Commission (ICC) to discontinue the Powhatan Arrow service and the ICC agreed to the request on May 9. The Powhatan Arrow made its final run on May 23. Afterwards, most of the former Powhatan Arrow coaches and dining cars with exception of diner No. 491, were repainted with the Pocahontas logo on both sides to be part of the Pocahontas being upgrade as N&W's flagship passenger train. The Pocahontas would also make its last run on May 1, 1971, where the N&W officially ended their passenger train services.

== Rolling stock disposition ==
=== Locomotives ===
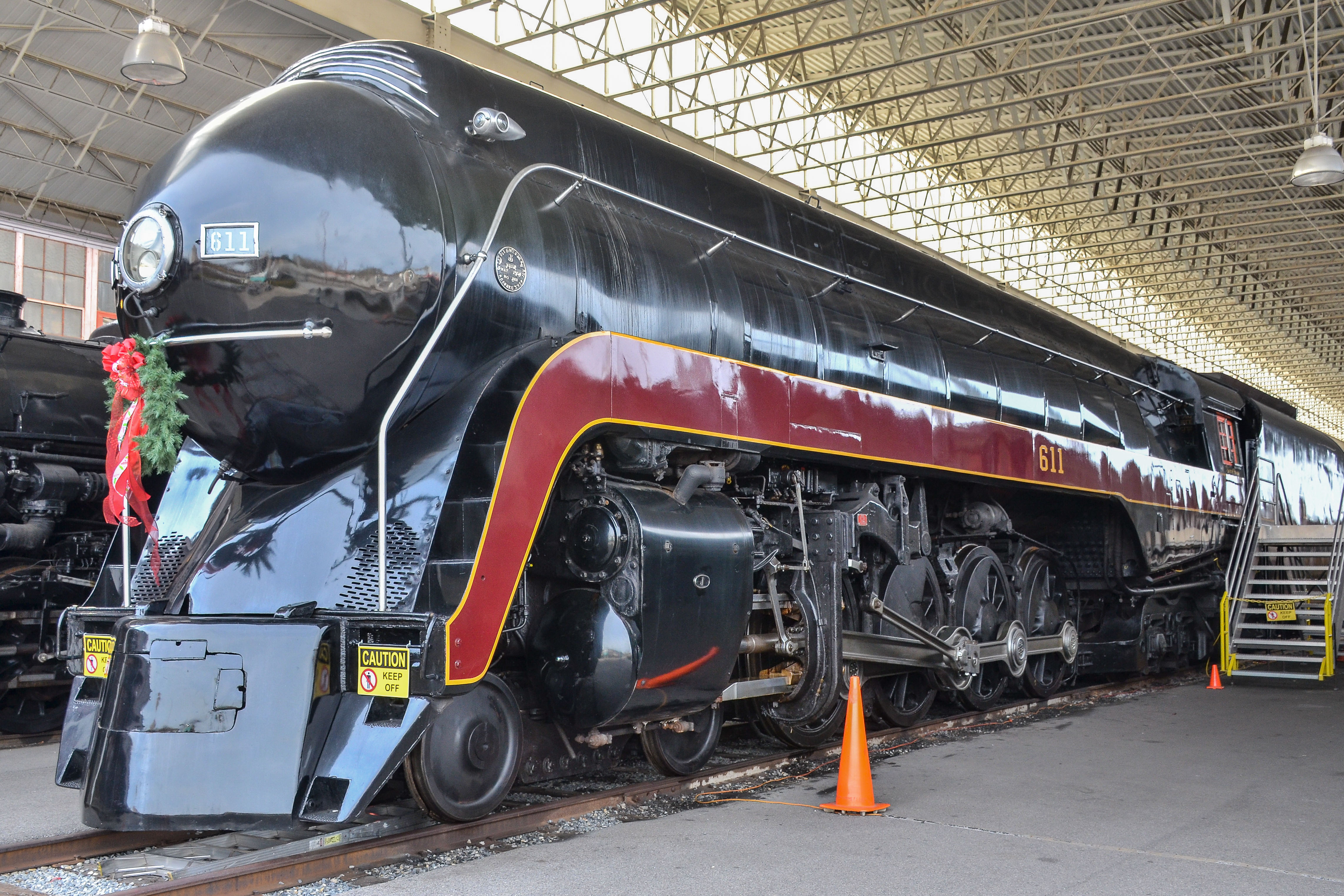
No. 611 on display at the VMT in December 2016

Only one class J locomotive survives: No. 611. It was saved from the scrap heap since it remained in good condition after being repaired from its accident in 1956. In 1981–1982, the N&W successor Norfolk Southern (NS) restored the locomotive to operating condition; it pulled excursion trains for the NS steam program until late 1994. In 2013–2015, the Virginia Museum of Transportation (VMT) in Roanoke, re-restored No. 611 to operation with $3.5 million from nearly 3,000 donors, including ones from 18 foreign countries. As of 2025, VMT operates the locomotive as a traveling exhibit.

Two EMD GP9s were preserved. No. 521 is owned and on display by the VMT. No. 514 was used in freight service by the N&W, then by NS until 1987, when it was sold to the Tennessee Southern Railroad. In 2004, Indiana Boxcar Corporation acquired No. 514 and leased it to Keystone Cooperative for use as a grain elevator switcher in Indiana. In August 2024, No. 514 was acquired by the Roanoke Chapter of the National Railway Historical Society (NRHS), which announced plans to restore it to its original Tuscan red livery.

=== Passenger cars ===
The 48-seat P1 coaches initially held a smoking lounge room for passengers and a locker area for the crew; these cars were rebuilt as 68-seat straight coaches in 1959. The P2 coaches had two sections to comply with the era's Jim Crow laws; the front for 24 black passengers, the rear for 42 white passengers. The P3 straight coaches had 58 seats plus spacious men's and women's restrooms. The D1 dining cars had 36 seats with a kitchen equipped with modern appliances such as an electric dishwasher and garbage disposal unit. The P4 tavern-lounge-observation cars had 52 seats in two sections. All of the cars' bottom skirtings were removed to simplify maintenance during 1955. After being removed from the Powhatan Arrow, both D4 observation cars were sold and exported to Saudi Arabia in 1960. By 1994, one of the observation car was scrapped, while the other is preserved in a museum. (Note: It was unknown of which number of the observation car is preserved weather it was No. 581 or 582.)

1949 passenger car details
Number	Class	Type	Seats	Images	Current owner	Disposition	Notes
491	D1	Diner-lounge (formerly Diner)	36		Norfolk Southern	Operational	Converted into a dormitory car by NS and renumbered to 12 with the name Indiana.
492	D1	Diner-lounge (formerly Diner)	36		Conway Scenic Railroad	Operational	Used as a diner in Lewiston, Maine, until being sold to the Conway Scenic Railroad in North Conway, New Hampshire, around August 2008.
501	P1	Straight (formerly Locker)	68 (formerly 48)		North Carolina Transportation Museum	Operational	Renumbered to 28, under NS ownership in 1984.
502	P1	Straight (formerly Locker)	68 (formerly 48)		-	Scrapped	Sold to Amtrak on October 19, 1971, and eventually scrapped around the late 1970s.
511	P2	Divided	66		-	Scrapped	Sold to the Ontario Northland Railway (ONT) in Canada during 1971.
512	P2	Divided	66		Roanoke Chapter NRHS	Undergoing restoration	Stored in 1971 until it was donated to the Roanoke Chapter NRHS in 1984.
531	P3	Straight	58		Atlanta Railcar Company	Leasing for use	
532	P3	Straight	58		-	Scrapped	Sold to ONT in 1971.
533	P3	Straight	58		North Carolina Transportation Museum	Operational	Renumbered to 29, under NS ownership in 1984.
534	P3	Straight	58		Eastern Virginia Railroad Historical Society	Undergoing restoration	Rebuilt into a commuter coach and renumbered to 1010 around 1975.
535	P3	Straight	58		-	Scrapped	Sold to ONT in 1971.
536	P3	Straight	58		Great Smoky Mountains Railroad	Operational	Used in excursion service with NS and later sold to the Great Smoky Mountains Railroad (GSMR) in Bryson City, North Carolina, on February 28, 1995.
537	P3	Straight	58		Roanoke Chapter NRHS	Operational	Rebuilt into a commuter coach and renumbered to 1009 around 1974. It was donated to the Roanoke Chapter NRHS in 1980 for lease in excursion service.
538	P3	Straight	58		Roanoke Chapter NRHS	Awaiting restoration	In storage after N&W ended passenger service in 1971 and was later donated to the Roanoke Chapter NRHS in July 1984.
539	P3	Straight	58		Watauga Valley Chapter NRHS	Operational	Retired from N&W passenger service in 1971 and used in commuter rail service at Chicago. Acquired by NS in 1982 for use in their steam program until it was donated to the Watauga Valley Chapter NRHS in 1992, where it was now use for lease in public and private excursions by Amtrak and some various heritage railroads and railroad museums.
540	P3	Straight	58		Tennessee Valley Railroad Museum	Awaiting restoration	In NS executive service until being sold to the Western Maryland Scenic Railroad (WSMR) in Cumberland, Maryland, during 1995.
581	P4	Tavern-lounge-observation	52		-	Scrapped or preserved	Sold and exported to Saudi Arabia in 1960.
582	P4	Tavern-lounge-observation	52		-	Scrapped or preserved	Sold and exported to Saudi Arabia in 1960.

== Accidents and incidents ==
- At 3:18 p.m. on June 12, 1946, No. 604 was hauling No. 26 at an excessive speed of 55 mph (89 km/h) when it derailed four miles west of Powhatan, West Virginia. The engineer and fireman were killed; 23 passengers, three dining car employees, and one train service employee were injured.
- On February 20, 1948, No. 607 was also hauling No. 26 when it derailed near Franklin Furnace, Ohio, killing its fireman. The accident was caused by failure to obey an automatic block-signal and entering a turnout at an excessive speed of 77 mph.
- On June 24, 1953, No. 611 was pulling No. 26 when it ran into the end of a tractor-trailer truck at a crossing near Ironton, Ohio, denting its bullet nose and crushing its front footstep on the fireman's side. It was repaired shortly afterwards.
- On the evening of December 7, 1954, No. 611 was pulling No. 25 when it collided with a 1941 Ford sedan at McDermott, Ohio.

== See also ==
- Chessie
- Coast Daylight
- Pere Marquette

== Bibliography ==
- Davis, Willie (January 2016). "Coal Country Queen: The Pocahontas". Passenger Train Journal. Vol. 40, no. 266. White River Productions. pp. 20–30.
- Dixon, Jr., Thomas W. (2009). Norfolk & Western's Powhatan Arrow (1st ed.). TLC Publishing. ISBN 978-0-939487-91-2.
- Drury, George H. (2015). Guide to North American Steam Locomotives (2nd ed.). Kalmbach Media. ISBN 978-1-62700-259-2.
- Hensley, Timothy B.; Miller, Kenneth L. (2021). Norfolk and Western Six-Eleven - 3 Times A Lady, Revised Edition (2nd ed.). Norfolk & Western Historical Society. ISBN 978-0-9899837-2-3.
- Jeffries, Lewis (2005). N&W: Giant of Steam, Revised Edition (2nd ed.). Norfolk and Western Historical Society, Inc. ISBN 0-9704794-5-X.
- Miller, Kenneth L. (2000). Norfolk and Western Class J: The Finest Steam Passenger Locomotive (1st ed.). Roanoke Chapter, National Railway Historical Society, Inc. ISBN 0-615-11664-7.
- Morgan, David P. (February 1950). "Fine new feathers". Trains. Vol. 10, no. 4. Kalmbach Publishing. pp. 14–17.
- Nichols, Jim (1997). Norfolk & Western in Color Volume 1: 1954-1964 (1st ed.). Morning Sun Books. ISBN 1-878887-72-6.
- Schafer, Mike; Welsh, Joe (1997). Classic American Streamliners (1st ed.). Motorbooks International. ISBN 0-7603-0377-0.
- Warden, William E.; Miller, Kenneth L. (2000). Norfolk and Western Passenger Service: 1946–1971 (2nd ed.). TLC Publishing. ISBN 1-883089-50-6.
