= Great Dismal Swamp train derailment =

1986 train derailment in Suffolk, Virginia

Coordinates: 36°44′50″N 76°27′40″W

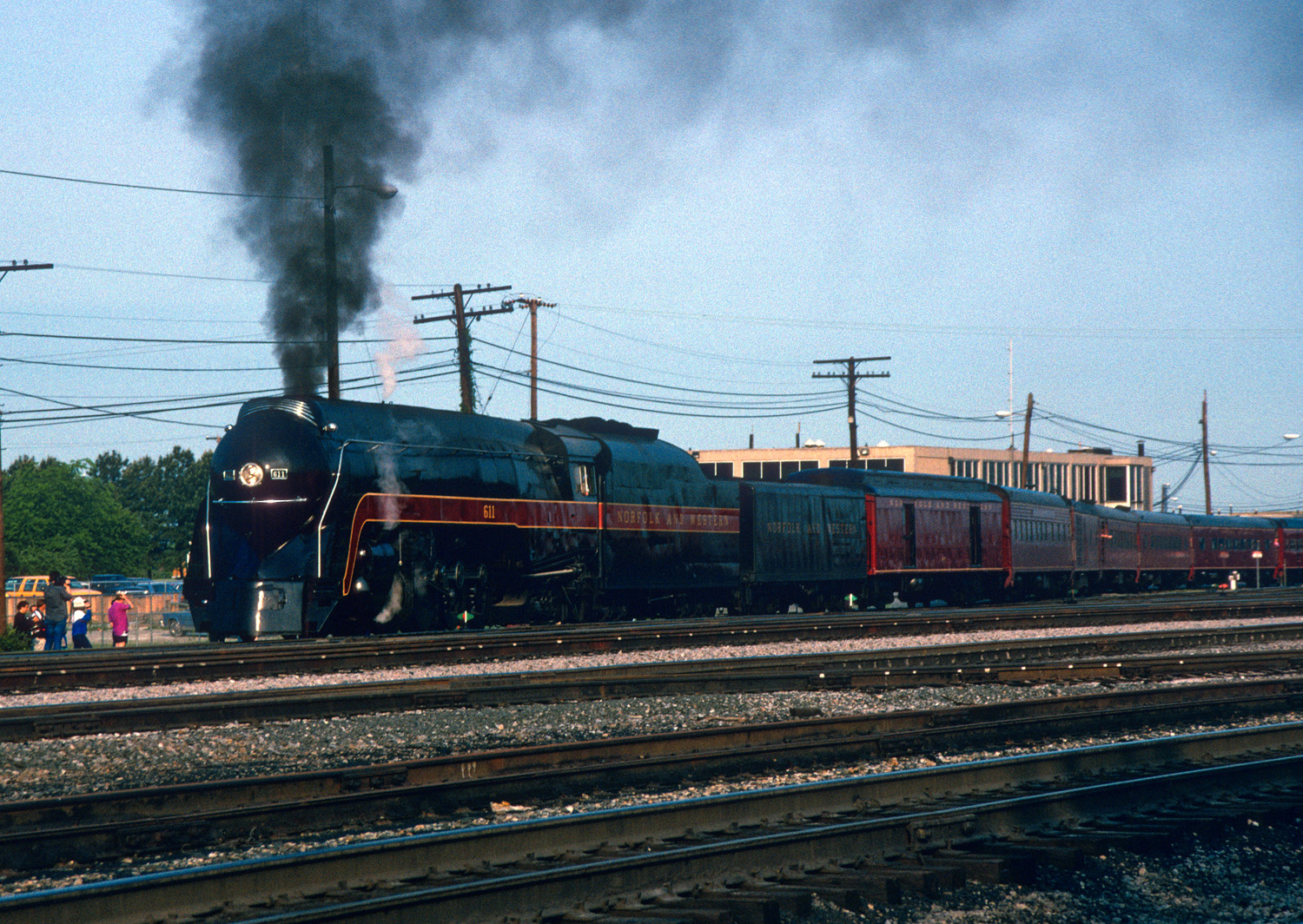
- Norfolk and Western 611, the locomotive involved in the derailment

Details
- Date: May 18, 1986; 02:09 p.m.
- Location: Suffolk, Virginia
- Country: United States
- Line: Norfolk District
- Operator: Norfolk Southern Railway
- Service: Passenger train
- Incident type: Derailment
- Cause: Misaligned switch

Statistics
- Trains: 1
- Passengers: 1000
- Injured: 177

The Great Dismal Swamp train derailment occurred on the afternoon of May 18, 1986, when a special Norfolk Southern employee passenger train derailed at the Great Dismal Swamp near Suffolk, Virginia. The accident injured 177 passengers; 18 were seriously injured and needed to be airlifted to nearby hospitals in Norfolk, Virginia. The train was pulled by Norfolk and Western 611, a class J 4-8-4 steam locomotive, which was restored to operating condition for excursion service in 1982.

== Accident ==
On the afternoon of May 18, 1986, at 1:31 P.M., No. 611 departed Norfolk, Virginia, pulling a Norfolk Southern (NS) employee special excursion train to Petersburg, Virginia. The train consisted of 23 passenger cars with NS chairman and CEO Robert B. Claytor running the locomotive. When the train was running at 58 mph (93 km/h) near the Great Dismal Swamp in Suffolk, Virginia, two of the passenger cars struck a faulty switch on the main line derailing them and the other 12 passenger cars with them. The locomotive, the first six cars, and the last two cars stayed on the rails undamaged. 177 passengers were injured while 18 of the most seriously injured needed to be airlifted to hospitals in Norfolk for treatment. Eleven of the derailed passenger cars were repaired, but the two open-air cars, the Missionary Ridge and Queen and Crescent Club were a total loss and scrapped. The other damaged car; the W. Graham Claytor, Jr., was donated to the VMT. After the wreck, NS decided to limit the steam locomotives, including No. 611, to 40 mph (64 km/h) while pulling excursions on their rails.

== See also ==
- Cedar train wreck

== Bibliography ==
- Wrinn, Jim (2000). Steam's Camelot: Southern and Norfolk Southern Excursions in Color (1st ed.). TLC Publishing. ISBN 1-883089-56-5.
