= Norfolk and Western Class J (1941) =

Class of 14 American 4-8-4 locomotives

Norfolk and Western J class (1941)
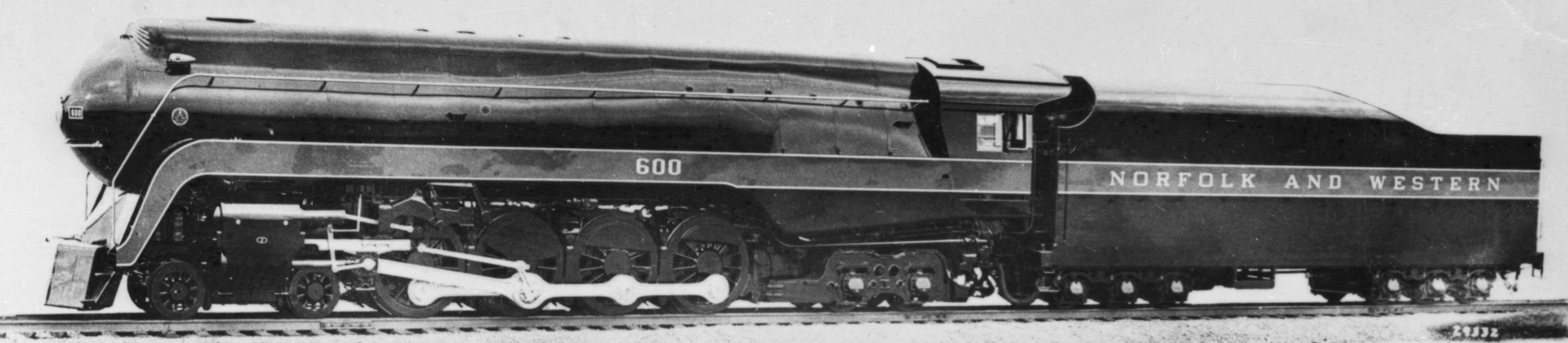
- Norfolk and Western No. 600, the first of the class
Type and origin
- Power type: Steam
- Designer: H.W. Reynolds; G.P. McGavock; C.H. Faris; Franklin C. Noel
- Builder: Roanoke Shops
- Build date: 1941–1950
- Total produced: 14
Specifications
- Configuration
  - Whyte: 4-8-4
  - UIC: 2′D2′ h2
- Gauge: 4 ft 8 1/2 in (1,435 mm) standard gauge
- Leading dia.: 36 in (914 mm)
- Driver dia.: 70 in (1,778 mm)
- Trailing dia.: 42 in (1,067 mm)
- Length: 109 ft 2 in (33.27 m)
- Width: 11 ft 2 in (3.40 m)
- Height: 16 ft 0 in (4.88 m)
- Axle load: 72,000 lb (32,658.7 kilograms; 32.7 tonnes) for drivers
- Adhesive weight: 288,000 lb (130.6 tonnes)
- Loco weight: 494,000 lb (224.1 tonnes)
- Tender weight: 378,600 lb (171.7 tonnes)
- Total weight: 872,600 lb (395.8 tonnes)
- Fuel type: Coal
- Fuel capacity: 35 short tons (70,000 lb), originally 26 short tons (52,000 lb) (Nos. 600-610)
- Water cap.: 20,000 US gal (76,000 L; 17,000 imp gal), originally 22,000 US gal (83,000 L; 18,000 imp gal) (Nos. 600-610)
- Fuel consumption: 6.5 short tons (5.9 t) of coal per hour 11,975 US gal (45,330 L; 9,971 imp gal) of water per hour
- Firebox
  - Grate area: 107.7 sq ft (10.01 m^{2})
- Boiler: 92 in (2,337 mm) (front); 102 in (2,591 mm) (back)
- Boiler pressure: 300 psi (2.07 MPa), originally 275 psi (1.90 MPa) (Nos. 600-610)
- Feedwater heater: Worthington 6-SA; 12,000 gal/hr capacity
- Heating surface
  - Firebox: 578 sq ft (53.7 m^{2})
  - Tubes: 2.25 in (57 mm)
  - Flues: 3.5 in (89 mm)
  - Tubes and flues: 4,693 sq ft (436.0 m^{2})
  - Total surface: 5,271 sq ft (489.7 m^{2})
- Superheater
  - Type: Elesco Type E
  - Heating area: 2,177 sq ft (202.2 m^{2})
- Cylinders: Two, outside
- Cylinder size: 27 in × 32 in (686 mm × 813 mm)
- Valve gear: Baker
- Valve type: Piston valves 14-inch (356 mm), 8.5-inch (216 mm) travel
Performance figures
- Power output: 5,100 hp (3,800 kW) @ tender drawbar
- Tractive effort: 80,000 lbf (355.86 kN)
- Factor of adh.: 3.6
Career
- Operators: Norfolk and Western Railway
- Class: J (3rd)
- Number in class: 14
- Numbers: 600–613
- Retired: 1958–1959
- Disposition: One preserved, remainder scrapped

The Norfolk and Western J class was a class of 14 4-8-4 "Northern" streamlined steam locomotives built by the Norfolk and Western Railway (N&W) at its Roanoke Shops in Roanoke, Virginia, between 1941 and 1950. The most powerful 4-8-4 locomotives ever produced in the U.S. and among the most powerful in the world, the J class were part of the N&W's "Big Three" (along with the class A and Y6 freight locomotives) that represented the pinnacle of U.S. steam technology.

They were built to pull N&W's named passenger trains on the N&W main line between Norfolk, Virginia, and Cincinnati, Ohio; they also ferried the Southern Railway's passenger trains between Monroe and Bristol, Virginia, until these trains were taken over by diesel locomotives in the summer of 1958. The class J locomotives were subsequently reassigned to haul local freight trains; all but one were retired and scrapped by the end of October 1959.

The lone exception was No. 611, which was donated to the Virginia Museum of Transportation (VMT) in 1962. It has been restored twice: once as part of the Norfolk Southern Railway's (NS) steam program in 1982, and again as part of the VMT's Fire up 611! campaign in 2015.

== History ==
=== Background and concept ===
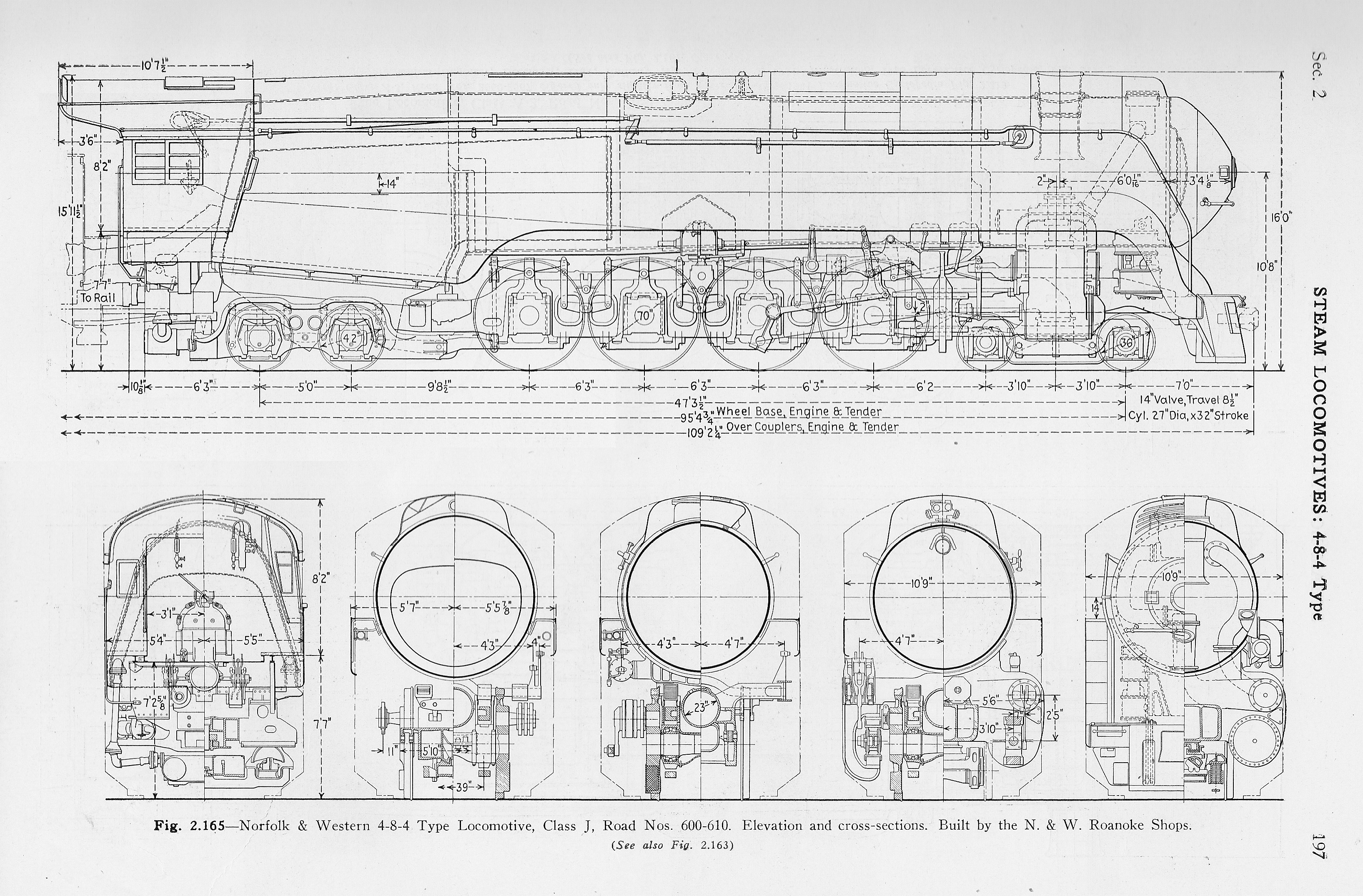
A drawing design of the N&W class J locomotive

In the late 1930s, the Norfolk and Western Railway's (N&W) K2 and K2a 4-8-2 "Mountains" were reaching their limit and could not handle the rising passenger traffic after the Great Depression abated, so the N&W opted for a more powerful and fancy-looking passenger steam locomotive. The N&W mechanical department team originally considered a class N 4-8-4 type, but deemed its 63 in (1,600 mm) driving wheels inadequate for the N&W's railway grades. N&W mechanical engineer H.W. Reynolds redesigned the drivers' diameter to a 70 in (1,778 mm) design that could be counterbalanced against wheel slippage.

In late 1940, N&W passenger car supervisor Franklin C. Noel originally drew a design, which was based on the Southern Pacific GS class, but the N&W officials rejected it to be "too plain". Noel reproposed the design with an almost similar specification to the streamlined New York Central Hudson, but was rejected again for being "too fancy". On the third and final concept, Noel developed the class J bullet-nosed design to give the locomotive smoothness and beauty along with speed, power, and dependability. His wife Louise suggested painting the locomotive black with a Tuscan red stripe wrapped with Dulux gold linings and letterings. The N&W officials were satisfied with the final design and considered it to be the most beautiful streamlined steam locomotive ever.

=== Construction and design changes ===
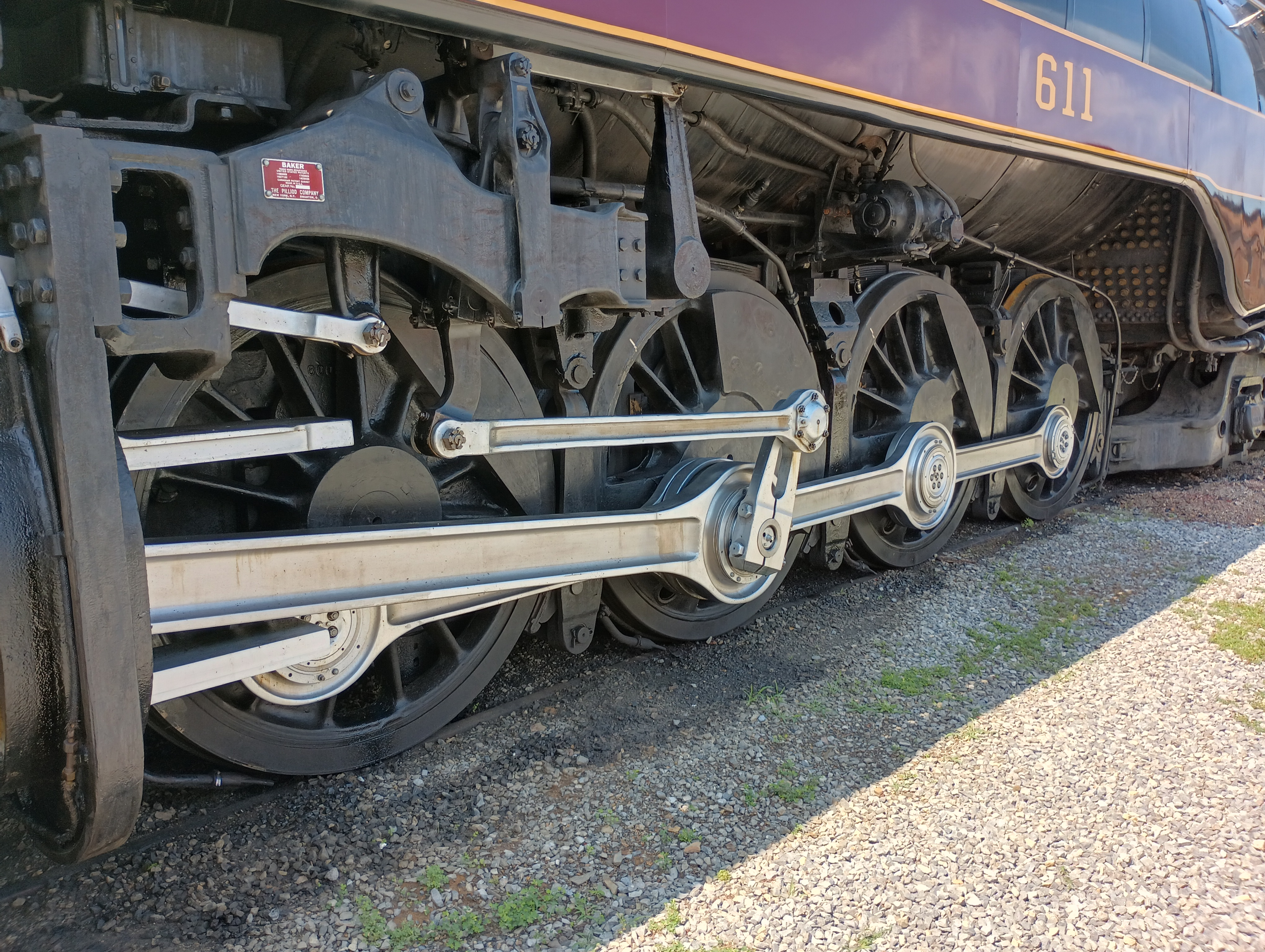
A close-up of No. 611's running gear in 2023 (Note: Most of the running gear's components came from sister locomotive No. 605.)

In the summer of 1941, the first of the J class, No. 600 was erected at the N&W's Roanoke (East End) Shops in Roanoke, Virginia, and completed on October 20. It sported a streamlined pilot with a retractable coupler that could horizontally swing out, a bullet-shaped nose with an enclosed headlight mounted into the nose, and a skyline casing that encased the smokestack, sand dome, steam dome, bell, whistle, and safety valves on top of the boiler. Among the running boards, there was a broad skirting mounted from the cab and firebox sides forward over the cylinders, then narrowing as turned into the pilot. The class J tender is a 22D-type, which holds 26 short tons (52,000 lb) of coal and 22,000 US gallons (83,000 L) of water. This would later change to 35 short tons (70,000 lb) and 20,000 US gallons (76,000 L), respectively due to multiple water stops on the N&W mainline in the mid-1940s. No. 600 was equipped with a Hancock long-bell 3-chime "steamboat" whistle, as well as Timken roller bearings and lightweight reciprocating parts on all of its axles, rods, pistons, crossheads, valve gear, and wrist pins, which provided the locomotive a smooth run and quicker acceleration.

The Roanoke Shops built four more locomotives; No. 601 on November 17; No. 602 on December 8; No. 603 on December 24; and No. 604 on January 27, 1942. No. 602 was equipped with a trailing truck booster, which increased starting tractive effort from 73,300 lbf (326.05 kN) up to 85,800 lbf (381.66 kN). In December 1945, No. 602's booster was removed for easier maintenance. The result was an increase in the starting tractive effort of the main engine to 80,000 lbf (355.86 kN) (rendering the booster on No. 602 superfluous), and an increase in maximum drawbar horsepower from 4,700 hp (3,500 kW) to 5,100 hp (3,800 kW) at 40 mph (64 km/h). Nos. 600–604 cost the N&W $167,000 apiece. Because of their presence, the class J locomotives became the poster of N&W's advertisements. They were built with automatic lubricators at 220 points, allowing them to operate up to 1,300 miles (2,100 km) between refills.

The second batch of six locomotives, Nos. 605–610, was delivered in 1943 at a cost of $168,550 each without streamlined casings and lightweight side rods, due to the limitations on the use of certain materials during the war; classifying them as the J1s. Unlike the previous batch, which were equipped with multiple-bearing crossheads, the second batch were built with alligator types as the N&W felt they were more satisfactory. In 1944, the N&W were allowed to reclassified the J1s as Js with the lightweight rods and streamlined shrouding added. By the end of 1949, the class J locomotives had accumulated their age and required more running repairs in addition to their scheduled shoppings.

In 1950, the last three locomotives, Nos. 611-613, built on May 29, June 27, and July 24, respectively, costing $251,544 each. Additionally, they were marked as the last mainline steam passenger locomotives built in the United States. This also brought the total number of J class locomotives to fourteen. Unlike Nos. 600-610, which had an arched tender deck, Nos. 611-613's tender deck had a flat top straight shape. Nos. 611-613 were also equipped with one-piece, cast steel pilot wheels, which were more economical than the spoke ones used on the previous batch. These new pilot wheels were applied to Nos. 600-610 later on during subsequent shoppings in the early 1950s. Additionally, the third batch had their bell mounted behind the pilot on the fireman's side instead of on top of the boiler. This configuration would also apply to the early batches around 1953.

In 1952, at the suggestion of Timken, the tandem coupling rods were discontinued. Nos. 600, 605, 610, and 611, who were scheduled for their major shoppings during 1958, had their tandem rods located between the second and third drivers replaced with a single coupling rod so that the rods were set closer to the wheels to reduce the stress of longer crankpins on the fourth driver and requiring less maintenance. Around 1955, all of the J class locomotives' streamlined front end, underneath the bullet nose, was given access holes to give ventilation for the cross-compound air pumps from behind.

The driving wheels were small for a locomotive that was able to pull trains at more than 100 mph (160 km/h). To overcome the limitation, the wheelbase was made extremely rigid, lightweight rods were used, and the counterbalancing was precise – so precise that it could theoretically allow the locomotives to reach speeds up to 140 mph (230 km/h) without the rail damage that could have occurred with conventional designs. One drawback of this highly engineered powertrain was sensitivity to substandard track.

Table of orders and numbers
Quantity	Serial Nos.	Year built	N&W No.	Tender No.	Tender deck shape	Crosshead type
5	311–315	1941–1942	600–604	220076-220080	Arched	Multiple-bearing
6	347–352	1943	605–610	220112-220117	Arched	Alligator
3	388–390	1950	611–613	220165-220167	Straight	Alligator

=== Testing and trial ===
While on loan between late 1944 and early 1945, No. 610 made twelve round trip runs, hauling a 1,015-ton passenger train with 11 to 15 cars at speeds of more than 110 mph (180 km/h) between Chicago, Illinois and Crestline, Ohio on the Pennsylvania Railroad's Fort Wayne Division. It even made two trips in freight service. On August 6, 1945, N&W used No. 604 for testing with a dynamometer car and fifteen cars, running from Roanoke to Walton, and back. After the testing, it was decided that all of the class J locomotives, including No. 604, would have their boiler pressure raised from the original 275 psi (1.90 MPa) to 300 psi (2.07 MPa) by fall of 1945. Despite the class J locomotives' small driving wheels, they rode very smoothly at all speeds: the Pennsylvania Railroad's inspector stated that it rode better than any of their own steam locomotives except for the 6-4-4-6 class S1 Duplex. They also steam very well even on poor coal due to the large grate.

=== Revenue service ===
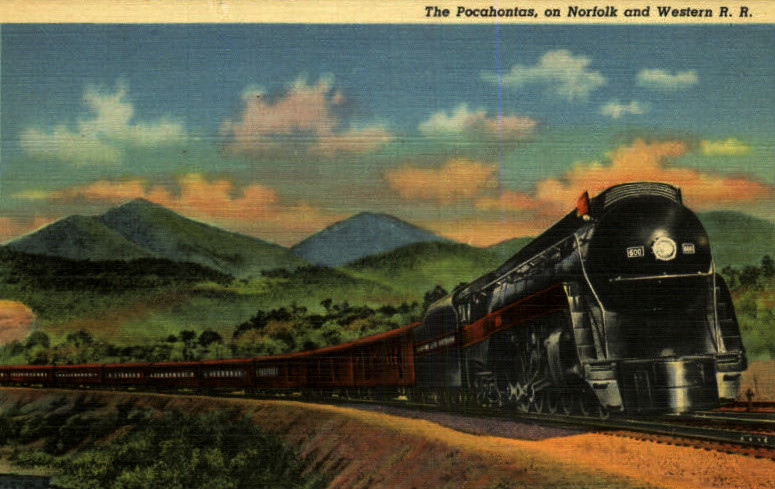
A postcard featuring locomotive No. 600 pulling the Pocahontas

The class J locomotives pulled the N&W's prominent passenger trains, such as the Powhatan Arrow, the Pocahontas, and the Cavalier between Norfolk and Cincinnati, as well as ferrying the Southern Railway's (SOU) Birmingham Special, Pelican, and Tennessean passenger trains between Monroe and Bristol, Virginia. They also hauled mail trains and local passenger trains. Additionally, while pulling N&W's mainline passenger trains each month, the class J locomotives would take in turns to swap each other out in Roanoke and go to the Shaffers Crossing engine terminal for maintenance service and a washdown. They can haul passenger trains from Roanoke to Cincinnati without locomotive change at a distance of 423 miles (681 km). Because of their power and speed, the class J locomotives were among the most reliable and efficient engines, running as many as 15,000 miles (24,000 km) per month, even on the mountainous and relatively short route of the N&W.

During 1941, No. 600 made visits at Bristol, Virginia on October 25; Winston-Salem, North Carolina, on October 27; Lynchburg, Virginia on October 28, and Durham, North Carolina, on October 29 for public displays. No. 600 made its first revenue run on October 30, pulling SOU's re-equipped Tennessean and later pulled N&W's Cavalier and Pocahontas passenger trains in early November. On the same month, No. 601 entered service pulling the Tennessean and Birmingham Special trains. No. 603 entered service on December 26, 1941; it pulled local passenger trains between Roanoke and Bristol for testing before being assigned to haul the Pocahontas and Cavalier fast passenger trains. On April 28, 1946, the class J locomotives became the main motive powers of the N&W's brand-new Powhatan Arrow passenger train.

=== Retirement ===
Around February and early March 1958, their tenders' rear decks were outfitted with a cupola to accommodate the head-end brakeman. In the summer of 1958, N&W's new president Stuart T. Saunders began to dieselize the railroad, ordering 268 GP9 locomotives from Electro-Motive Diesel (EMD). However, Saunders did not receive the passenger GP9s and instead leased an EMD E6A (No. 512) and seven EMD E7A units (Nos. 524, 530, 531, 533, and 549-551) leased from the Atlantic Coast Line (ACL) and four EMD E8A units (Nos. 1012-1015) from the Richmond, Fredericksburg and Potomac (RF&P) to replace the class J steam locomotives in passenger service.

The class Js were reassigned to local freight service on the Norfolk Division, running between Norfolk and Crewe, Virginia, along with occasional trips to Lynchburg, Virginia. They also hauled timed freight trains on the Scioto Division, between Williamson, West Virginia, and Columbus, Ohio. Additionally in early 1958, they were also given tonnage ratings over the Kenova District between Williamson, West Virginia and Portsmouth, Ohio, where they were rated for 11,500 tons of drag freight and 5,000 tons of timed freight. When the ACL E units returned to their railroad to handle heavy winter traffic in Florida, some of the class J locomotives briefly returned to passenger service until being replaced by N&W's new passenger GP9s, which arrived in late 1958. Some of them continued to haul freight trains until their boiler flue ticket certificate expired around 1959. Ultimately, the class Js had operated approximately 30,450,000 miles (49,000,000 km) in revenue service.

N&W J class locomotive retirement details
Nos.	Retirement date	Disposal date	Disposition
600	June 16, 1959	August 1959	Sold for scrap at M.D. Friedman in Portsmouth, Ohio.
601	March 27, 1959		Scrapped at M.D. Friedman in Portsmouth, Ohio.
602	January 8, 1959	February 1959	Retired at Bluefield, West Virginia and scrapped in Roanoke, Virginia.
603	April 24, 1959		Retired at Bluefield, West Virginia
604	October 24, 1958		Retired at Shaffers Crossing, Roanoke, Virginia
605	June 15, 1959		Retired at Williamson, West Virginia
606	May 22, 1959		Retired at Bluefield, West Virginia and scrapped at M.D. Friedman in Portsmouth, Ohio.
607	February 25, 1959		Retired at Shaffers Crossing, Roanoke, Virginia
608	May 22, 1959		Retired at Bluefield, West Virginia
609	May 22, 1959		Retired at Bluefield, West Virginia
610	August 21, 1959		Retired at Crewe, Virginia
611	October 27, 1959	May 1962	Preserved at the Virginia Museum of Transportation in Roanoke, Virginia
612	August 21, 1959		Retired at Lambert's Point, Norfolk, Virginia
613	March 27, 1959	July 1959	Scrapped at M.D. Friedman in Portsmouth, Ohio

=== Accidents and incidents ===
- On June 12, 1946, No. 604 hauled the eastbound Powhatan Arrow after departing Cincinnati, Ohio, at 8:10 a.m. for Norfolk. At 3:18 p.m., the locomotive derailed four miles west of Powhatan, West Virginia, due to excessive speed at 56 mph, killing the engineer and fireman. These injuries included 23 passengers, three dining car employees, and one train service employee.
- On February 20, 1948, No. 607 derailed near Franklin Furnace, Ohio, while hauling the Powhatan Arrow, killing its fireman. The cause of the accident was failure to obey an automatic block-signal and entering a turnout at an excessive speed of 77 mph.
- On October 30, 1953, in Wallace, Virginia, just northeast of Bristol, No. 613 crashed into the rear of a local freight train while pulling the No. 45 Tennessean train, injuring 56 people. The accident was blamed on the fast passenger train for failing to heed warning signals. The loco was repaired and remained in service until 1959.
- On January 23, 1956, No. 611 derailed along the Tug River near Cedar, Mingo County, West Virginia, while pulling the Pocahontas. The engineer ran the engine at an excessive speed around a curve and its high center of gravity caused it to flip on its side. The loco was repaired and continued revenue passenger service.
- On May 18, 1986, No. 611 was at the head of a Norfolk Southern employee appreciation train from Norfolk with Robert Claytor at the throttle. One of the passenger cars failed to negotiate a switch on the main line through the Great Dismal Swamp, causing it and 12 other cars of the 23-car train to derail. 177 of nearly 1,000 employees and their family members were injured; some of the more seriously injured had to be airlifted to hospitals in nearby Norfolk for treatment.

== Preservation ==
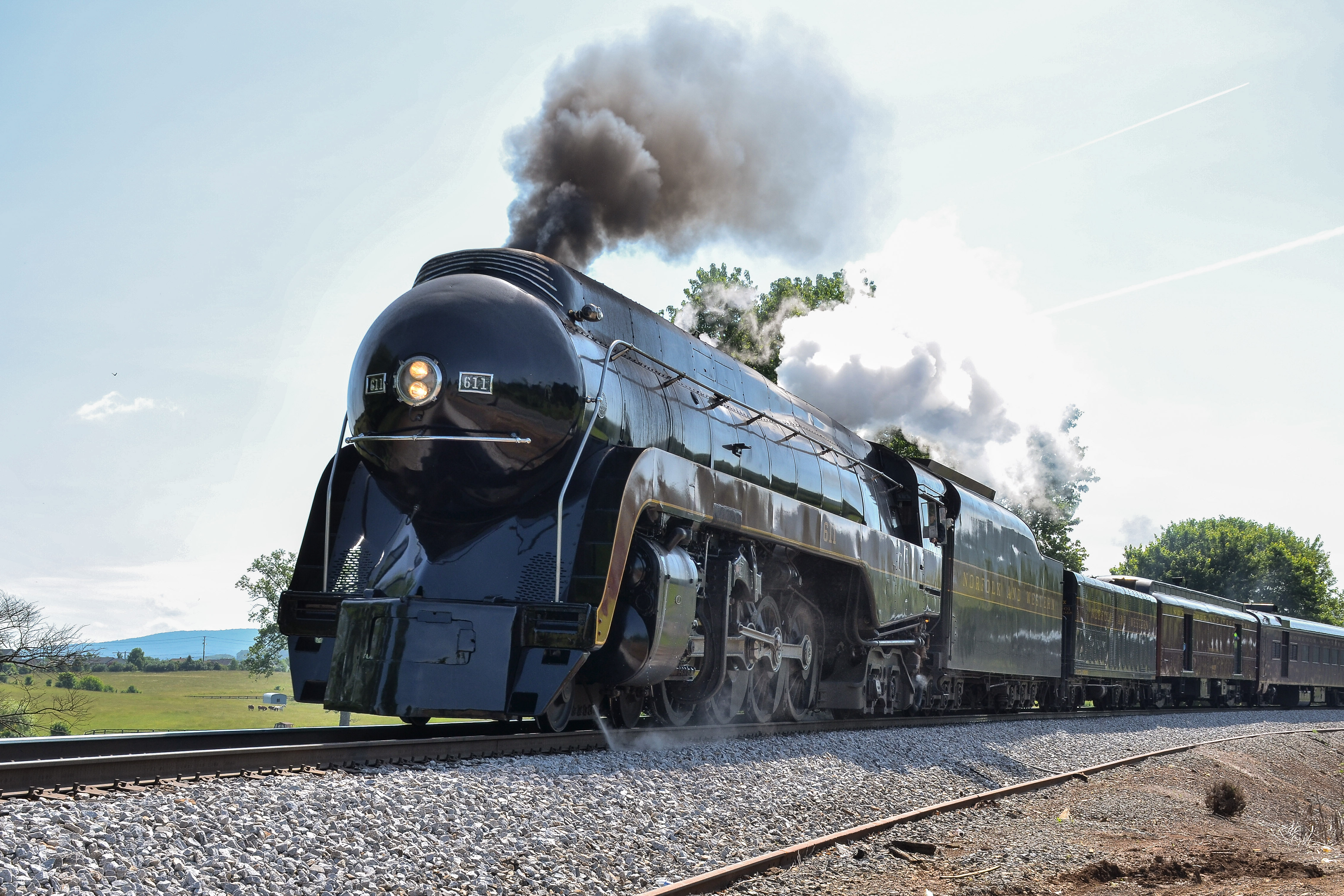
Norfolk and Western No. 611 pulling an excursion in 2015

Only one class J locomotive has been preserved. No. 611's survival is due to its excellent condition in the late 1950s, thanks to its 1956 derailment and subsequent repair, and to attorney and railfan W. Graham Claytor Jr., who worked to save one class J locomotive from scrapping. During its final revenue run in late 1959, it pulled three sponsored excursions from the Appalachian Power Company, the Washington Chapter of the National Railway Historical Society, and the Rail Museum Safari.

No. 611 was donated to the Virginia Museum of Transportation (VMT) in 1962, where it sat on static display for two decades. In 1981 and 1982, it was restored to operating condition for Norfolk Southern's (NS) steam program, where it used to pull excursion trains as far south as Florida, as far north as New York, and as far west as Illinois and Missouri. In late 1994, the locomotive was once again retired and sent to the VMT after liability insurance costs led NS to end its steam program.

From 2013 to 2015, the VMT restored No. 611 at a cost of $3.5 million covered by nearly 3,000 donors from 19 countries. The VMT has since operated the locomotive as a traveling exhibit, sending it to the North Carolina Transportation Museum, the Strasburg Rail Road, and the Virginia Scenic Railway.

== See also ==
- List of Norfolk and Western Railway locomotives
- New York Central Niagara
- Norfolk and Western Railway class A
- Southern Pacific class GS-4

== Bibliography ==
- Dixon, Jr., Thomas W. (2009). Norfolk & Western's Powhatan Arrow (1st ed.). TLC Publishing. ISBN 978-0-939487-91-2.
- Drury, George H. (2015). Guide to North American Steam Locomotives (2nd ed.). Kalmbach Publishing. ISBN 978-1-62700-259-2.
- Hensley, Timothy B.; Miller, Kenneth L. (2021). Norfolk and Western Six-Eleven - 3 Times A Lady, Revised Edition (2nd ed.). Norfolk & Western Historical Society, Inc. ISBN 978-0-9899837-2-3.
- Jeffries, Lewis (2005). N&W: Giant of Steam, Revised Edition (2nd ed.). Norfolk and Western Historical Society, Inc. ISBN 0-9704794-5-X.
- McClure, III, William G.; Plant, Jeremy F. (2007). Norfolk & Western Steam in Color (1st ed.). Morning Sun Books. ISBN 978-1-58248-216-3. Archived from the original on 2023-08-02.
- Miller, Kenneth L. (2000). Norfolk and Western Class J: The Finest Steam Passenger Locomotive (1st ed.). Roanoke Chapter, National Railway Historical Society, Inc. ISBN 0-615-11664-7.
- Miller, Kenneth L. (2015). "The Norfolk & Western Class J". Trains. No. 2. Kalmbach Media. pp. 22–29. ISBN 978-1-62700-305-6.
- Nichols, Jim (1997). Norfolk & Western in Color Volume 1: 1954-1964 (1st ed.). Morning Sun Books. ISBN 1-878887-72-6. Archived from the original on 2023-08-02.
- Prince, Richard E. (1980). Norfolk & Western Railway: Pocahontas Coal Carrier (1st ed.). KP Graphics-Utah Division. SBN 9600088-9-6.
- Rosenburg, Ron; Archer, Eric H. (1973). Norfolk & Western Steam (The Last 25 Years) (1st ed.). Quadrant Press Inc. ISBN 0-915276-00-3.
- Warden, William E. (1987). Norfolk and Western Railway A and J Class Locomotives (1st ed.). Andover Junction Publications. ISBN 0-944119-02-6.
- Warden, William E.; Miller, Kenneth L. (2000). Norfolk and Western Passenger Service: 1946–1971 (2nd ed.). TLC Publishing. ISBN 1-883089-50-6.
- Withuhn, William L. (2019). American Steam Locomotives: Design and Development, 1880–1960 (1st ed.). Indiana University Press. ISBN 978-0-253-03933-0.
