= Pocahontas (train) =

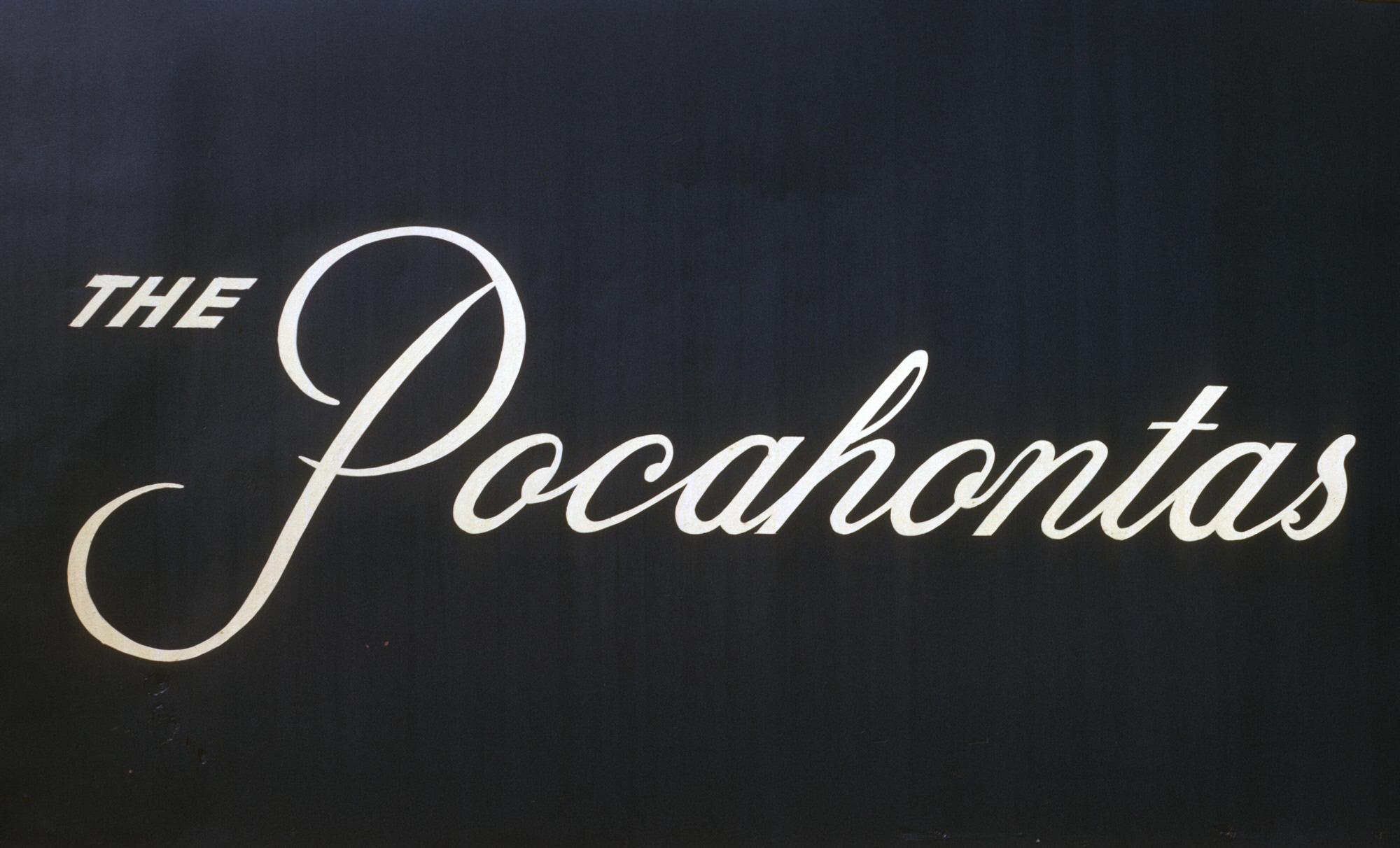

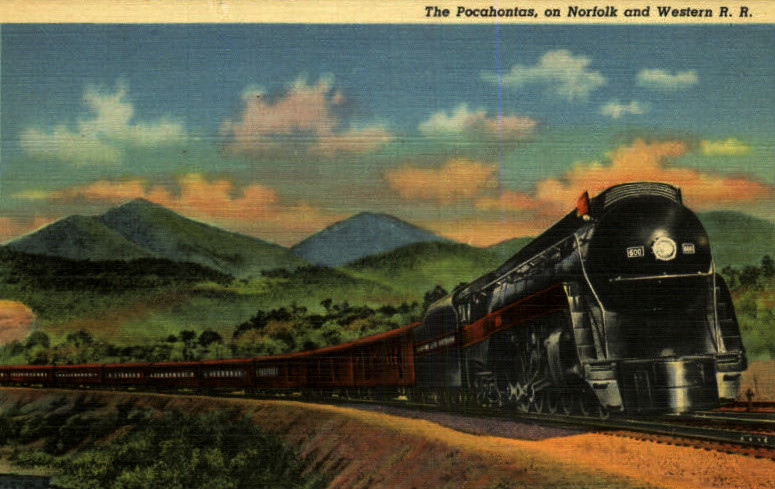
- A postcard photo of the Pocahontas

Overview
- Service type: Inter-city rail
- Status: Discontinued
- Locale: Midwest/Middle Atlantic
- Predecessor: Norfolk-Chicago Express
- First service: November 21, 1926; 99 years ago
- Last service: May 1, 1971; 55 years ago
- Successor: Mountaineer
- Current operator: Norfolk and Western Railway

Route
- Termini: Norfolk, Virginia; Cincinnati, Ohio
- Distance travelled: 676.6 miles (1,088.9 km)
- Service frequency: Daily
- Train number: 3/4

On-board services
- Seating arrangements: Coaches
- Sleeping arrangements: Open sections, compartments and drawing rooms (1949)
- Catering facilities: Dining car

Technical
- Track gauge: 4 ft 8 1/2 in (1,435 mm) standard gauge

The Pocahontas (or the Pokey for short) was a named overnight passenger train, operated by the Norfolk and Western Railway (N&W) in the United States. It made its inaugural operation on November 21, 1926, with two trains; Nos. 3 and 4, which both ran 676 miles (1,088 km) daily at night on the N&W mainline between Norfolk, Virginia, and Cincinnati, Ohio, with a through-connection to and from Chicago, Illinois. The Pocahontas replaced an earlier passenger train called the Norfolk-Chicago Express, which bears the same train numbers.

== History ==
=== Background and inauguration ===
During the Roaring Twenties, passenger intercity ridership on all railroads, including the Norfolk and Western (N&W), started to decline as more people started to buy and drive the automobiles to travel. On November 21, 1926, N&W management, determined to maintain their ridership, launched their brand-new Pocahontas train service, which ran on N&W's 676 miles (1,088 km) mainline daily at night between Norfolk, Virginia, and Cincinnati, Ohio. The train was named after the Native American woman, Pocahontas, who rescued English explorer John Smith. Additionally, the train's name was received by city ticket agent E.V. Perdew of Portsmouth, Ohio, who won the $25 first prize in an N&W naming contest.It has two trains: Nos. 3 and 4. The former left Norfolk at 2:40 p.m. and arrived at Cincinnati at 7:35 a.m., while the latter left Cincinnati at 11:25 p.m. and arrived back at Norfolk at 5:10 p.m. A connection was made in Portsmouth, with the Columbus District passenger trains 33 and 34.

The train carried two 10-roomette-6-double-bedroom sleeping cars from Norfolk to Cincinnati, one of which went through to Chicago on train 71 of the Pennsylvania Railroad. Pocahontas also handled a Winston-Salem to Columbus 10-6 sleeping car that was carried in train 12 from Winston-Salem to Roanoke, train 3 from Roanoke to Portsmouth, and train 33 from Portsmouth to Columbus. All those trains had counterparts operating in the opposite directions.

The most famous engines to power the Pocahontas were the class J steam locomotives. They were the pride of the N&W, pulling crack passenger trains such as the Cavalier, the Powhatan Arrow, and the Pocahontas, as well as ferrying the Southern Railway's Tennessean between Lynchburg, Virginia, and Bristol, Virginia. One test proved that a class J could pull 15 cars at 100 m.p.h. along one section of flat, straight track in eastern Virginia. The only surviving unit of the J class is No. 611.

In April 1946 the N&W ordered sufficient passenger cars to re-equip the Pocahontas partially and the Powhatan Arrow completely. The new cars for the Pocahontas included ten 56-seat coaches (P3 class #531–540), two 36-seat dining cars (D1 class, #493 General William Mahone and #494 Frederick J. Kimball), three 10-roomette-6-double bedroom cars from Pullman-Standard (S2 class), and 20 similar cars from Budd (S1 class). Some of the P3 and two more D1 cars (#491–492) were for the Powhatan Arrow, and the sleeping cars, which were all named after colleges and counties in Virginia, were used on all N&W sleeping-car trains.

The cars were delivered in 1949. They were smooth-sided and were delivered in Tuscan Red and Black; even the stainless-steel Budd cars were painted, and they lacked the usual fluted sides. Of the ten P3 cars, eight may still be in operation. Several of those cars were used in the Norfolk Southern Steam Program. The N&W streamlined/lightweight trains were originally painted as follows: sides, ends, and skirts ("Tuscan Red"), roofs ("Dark Brown"), with Trucks ("Pullman Green") and lettering/striping ("Gold Leaf").

Around the early 1950s the lettering/striping was changed to imitation gold. The roofs, when repainted in the '50s, changed to black, as were the trucks. The heavyweights were painted the same but did not carry train-name logos or striping. N&W adopted blue at the end of 1965, but the repaints were not all done right away.

May 1, 1971, marked the final run for N&W train 4, the eastbound Pocahontas; it was also N&W's last regularly scheduled passenger train. For the occasion, Nickel Plate Road (NKP) 2-8-4 No. 759 was brought in to haul the train, complete with a relettering to "NORFOLK AND WESTERN."

== Major stops ==
- Norfolk Terminal Station
- Petersburg Union Station
- Lynchburg
- Roanoke
- Christiansburg station
- Bluefield, West Virginia
- Portsmouth, Ohio
- Cincinnati Union Terminal
- Branch service from Petersburg to Richmond; branch service from Portsmouth to Columbus, Ohio

== Derailments ==
- On January 23, 1956, class J No. 611 derailed along the Tug River near Cedar, Mingo County, West Virginia while pulling the Pocahontas. It was determined that the engineer ran the engine at an excessive speed around a curve and its high center of gravity caused it to flip on its side. No. 611 was repaired and continued revenue passenger service. It was retired in 1959 and purchased by the Virginia Museum of Transportation, which restored it to operational condition in 2015.

== Bibliography ==
- Warden, William E.; Miller, Kenneth L. (2000). Norfolk and Western Passenger Service: 1946–1971 (2nd ed.). TLC Publishing. ISBN 1-883089-50-6.
