= Petersburg Union Station =

Former railway station in Petersburg, Virginia

Petersburg, VA
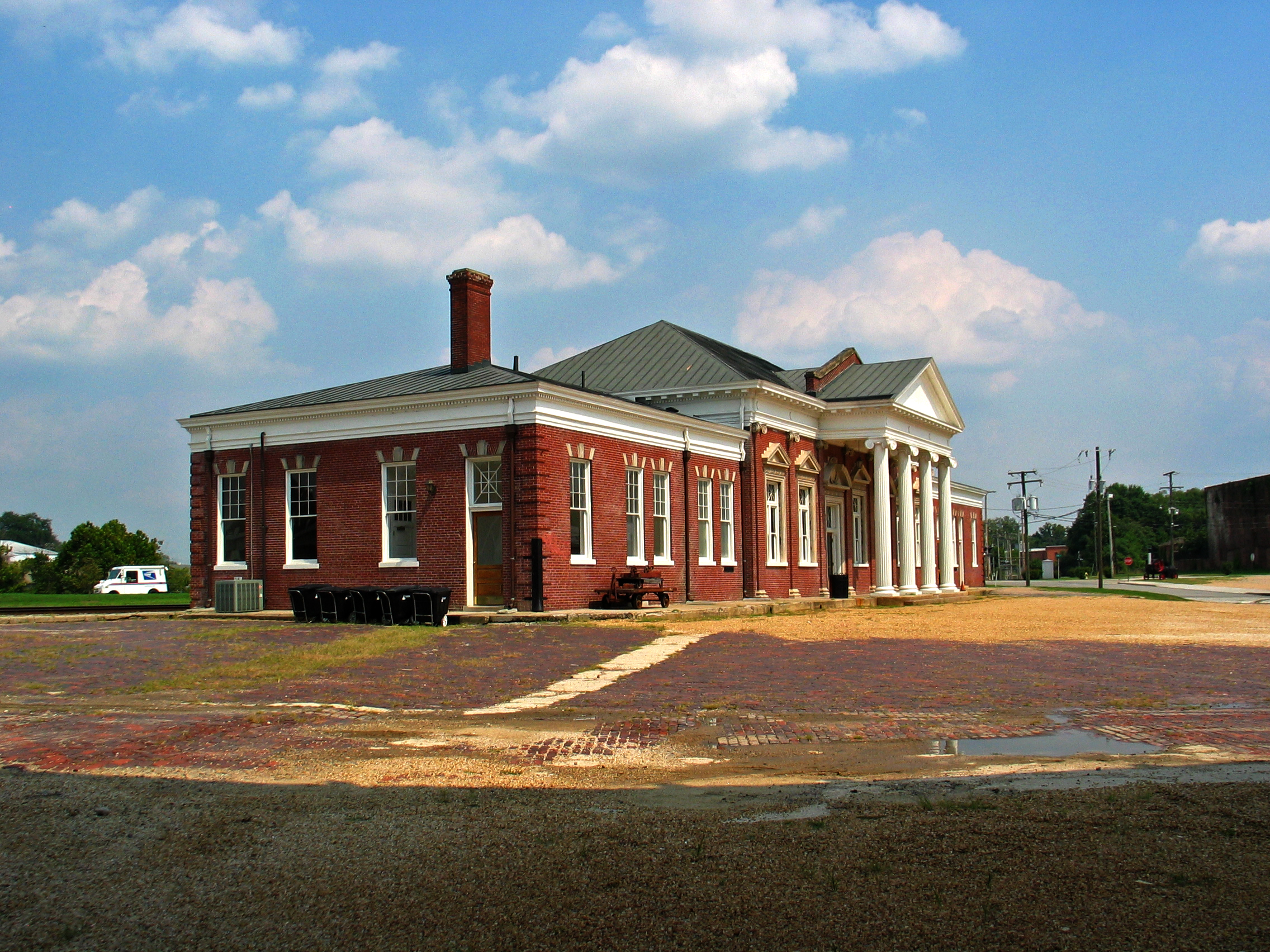
- Petersburg Union Station in 2005

General information
- Location: 103 River Street, Petersburg, Virginia
- Coordinates: 37°14′3.4″N 77°24′9.2″W
Former services
Preceding station	Amtrak	Following station
Nottoway County toward Chicago	Mountaineer 1975–1977	Suffolk toward Norfolk
Preceding station	Atlantic Coast Line Railroad	Following station
Reams toward Tampa	Main Line	Dunlop toward Richmond
Preceding station	Norfolk and Western Railway	Following station
Jack toward Cincinnati	Main Line	Poe toward Norfolk
- Petersburg Union Station
- U.S. Historic district – Contributing property
- Built: 1909-1910
- Architect: Norfolk and Western Railway
- Part of: Petersburg Old Town Historic District (ID80004314)
- Designated CP: July 4, 1980
Location

Petersburg Union Station is a former train station in Petersburg, Virginia, United States. It was built in 1909–1910 for the Norfolk and Western Railway and was later used by the Atlantic Coast Line Railroad and Amtrak.

== History ==
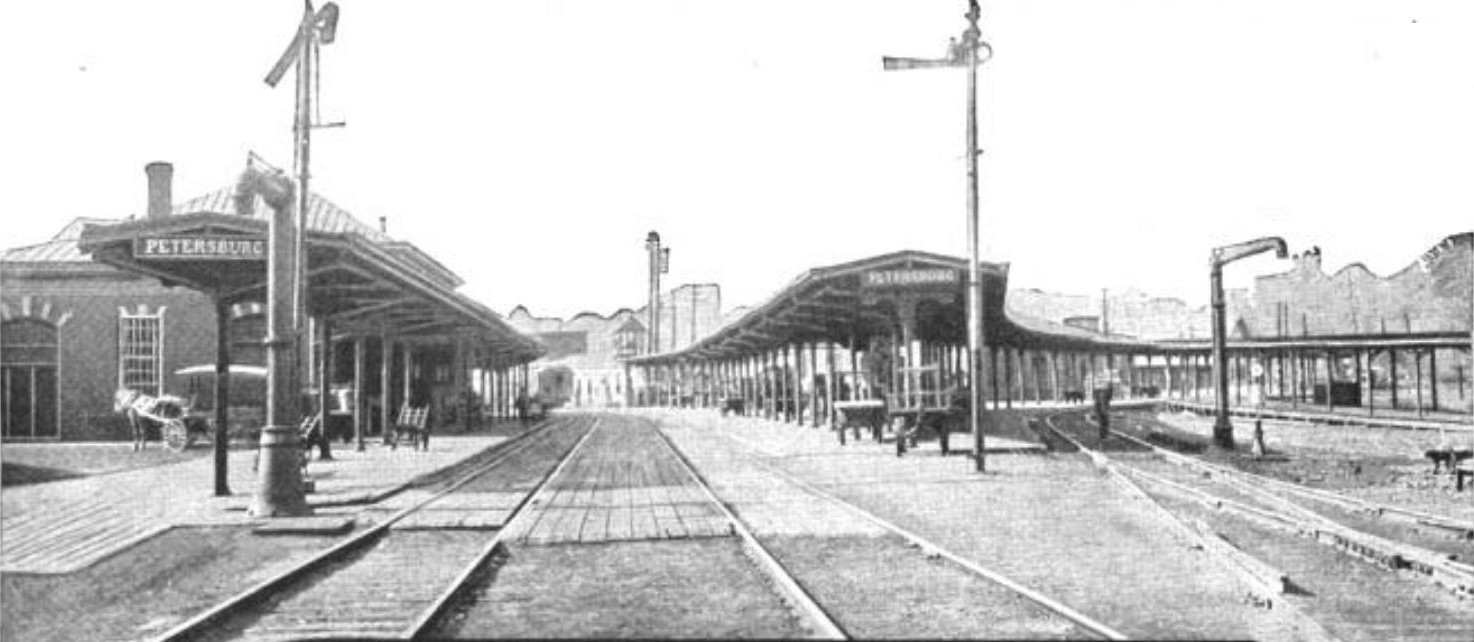
Union Station in 1921

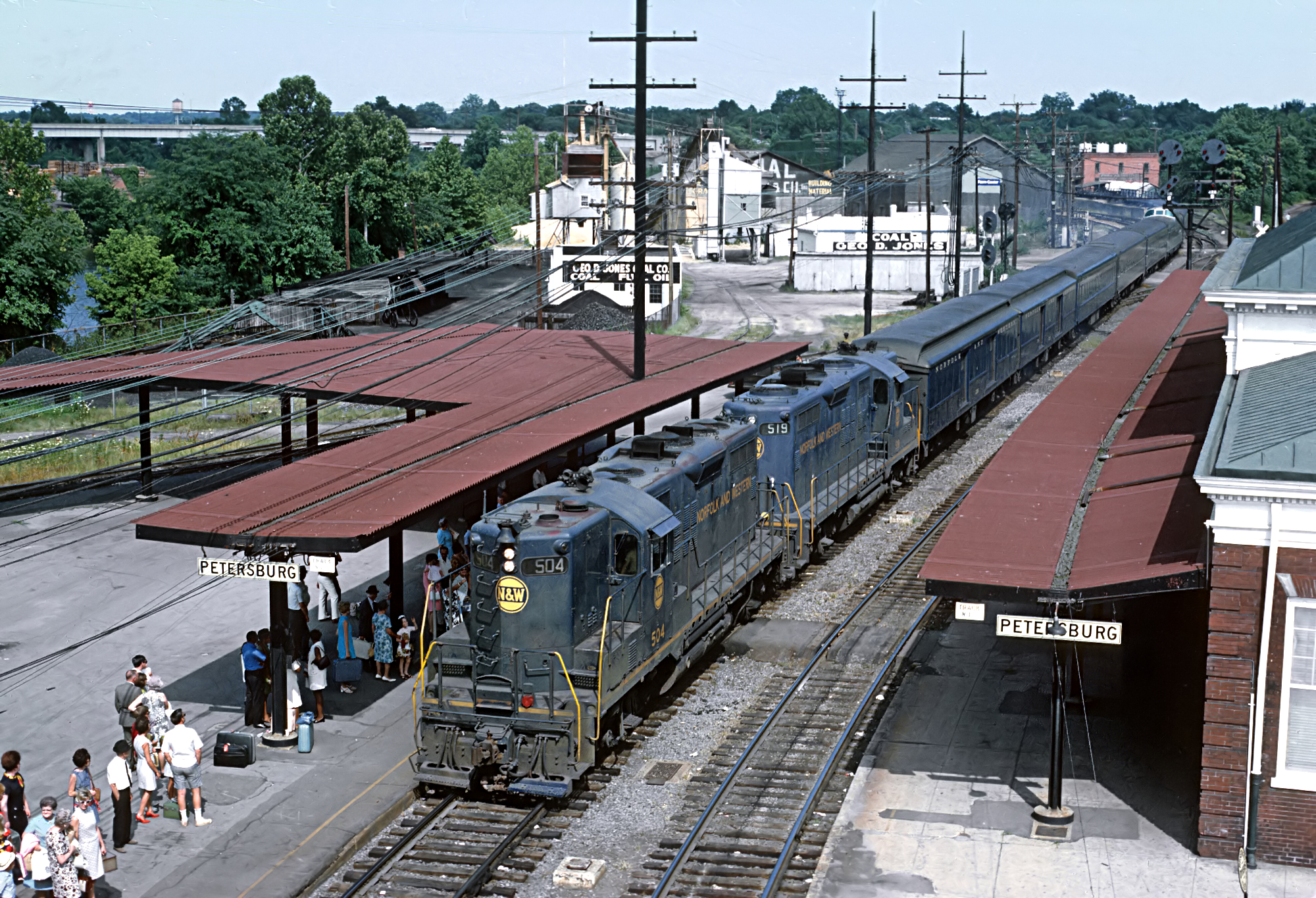
The Pocahantas at Petersburg in 1970

The Petersburg Railroad (opened 1833) and Richmond and Petersburg Railroad (opened 1838) ran north–south on a winding route through Petersburg. The two lines merged in 1898 and became part of the Atlantic Coast Line Railroad (ACL) in 1900. The ACL used a station located at Washington Street and Union Street. The east–west Southside Railroad, predecessor of the Norfolk and Western Railway (N&W), opened in the early 1850s. It used a still-extant station at River Street and Rock Street.

The Seaboard Air Line Railroad (SAL) opened its own north–south line through Petersburg in 1900, crossing the Appomattox River on a high bridge. The SAL had a passenger station at Dunlop Street for through trains, and terminating passenger and freight stations at Market Street on a spur line. The SAL never used Union Station; the Dunlop Street station was replaced with a brick station near Bluefield Street in 1944.

In 1909–10, the N&W constructed Union Station at the junction with the ACL near Third Street. It allowed riders to transfer between the Norfolk–Cincinnati trains - the Cavalier, Pocahontas and Powhatan Arrow - and ACL Florida–New York trains. The ACL moved to a new station in Ettrick on a western bypass route in 1955, leaving only the N&W at Union Station.

When Amtrak took over intercity passenger service on May 1, 1971, east–west service on the N&W was discontinued, while north–south service continued to use the Ettrick station. From 1975 to 1977, Amtrak operated the Norfolk-Cincinnati Mountaineer, with a stop at Union Station The Hilltopper, which replaced the Mountaineer and ran until 1979, used a station located slightly to the west at Fleet Street instead.

Union Station is part of the Petersburg Old Town Historic District, which was added to the National Register of Historic Places in 1980.
