= Norfolk Terminal Station =

Former union train station in Virginia

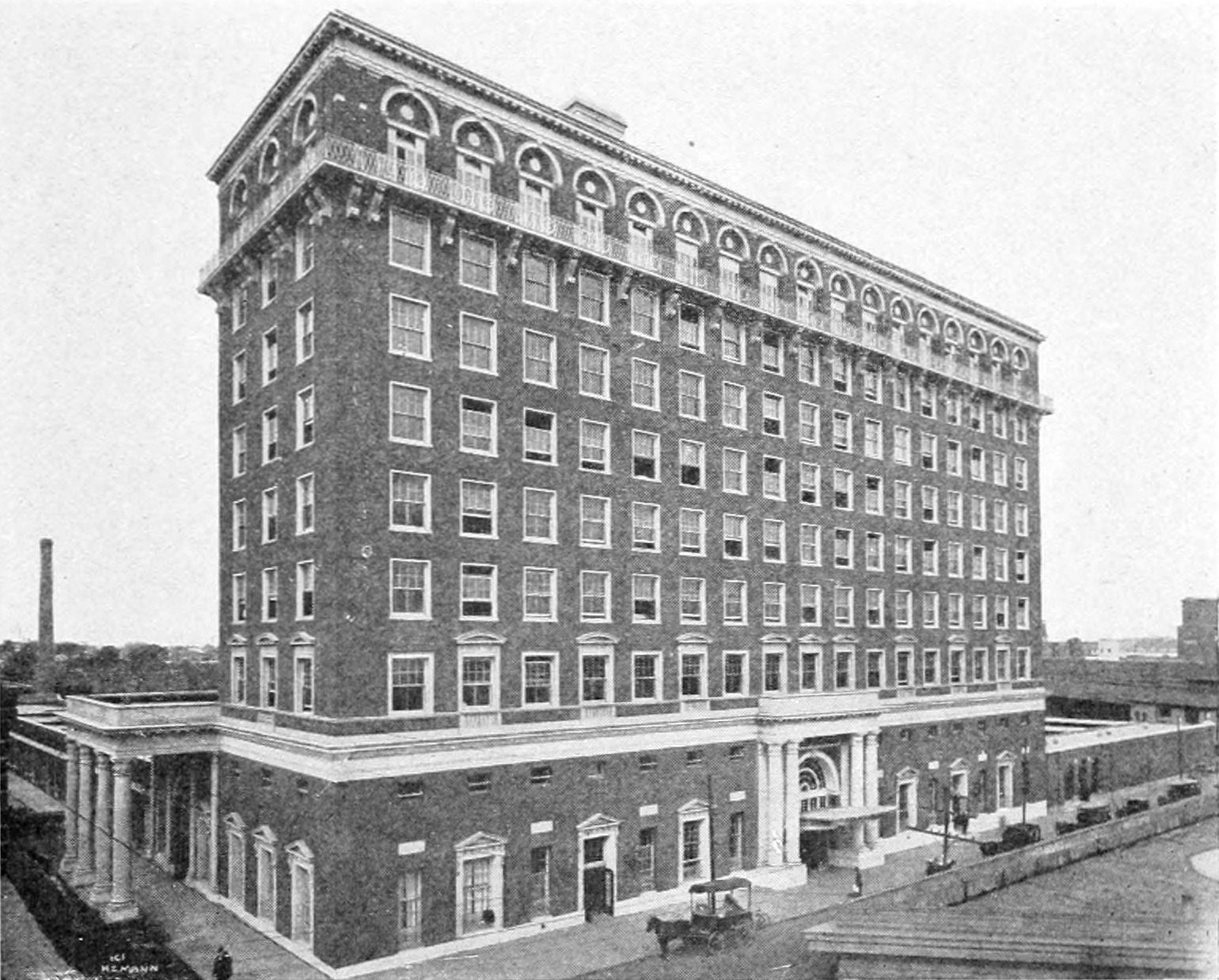
- Photo of the station c. 1914

General information
- Coordinates: 36.843078°N 76.281938°W
- Lines: Norfolk and Western Railway, Norfolk Southern Railway, Virginian Railway

History
- Opened: 1912
- Closed: 1962

Key dates
- 1963: demolished

Former services
Preceding station	Norfolk and Western Railway	Following station
Suffolk toward Cincinnati	Main Line	Terminus
Preceding station	Virginian Railway	Following station
Sunray toward Deepwater	Main Line	Terminus
Location

Norfolk Terminal Station was a railroad union station located in Norfolk, Virginia, which served passenger trains and provided offices for the Norfolk and Western Railway, the original Norfolk Southern Railway (a regional carrier in Virginia and North Carolina which became part of and later lent its name to the much larger company known as Norfolk Southern in the 1980s) and the Virginian Railway. The N&W, Norfolk Southern, and Virginian's Norfolk terminal location stood in contrast to competitor railroads, such as the Chesapeake and Ohio Railway, Southern Railway, Atlantic Coast Line Railroad, Pennsylvania Railroad and Seaboard Air Line Railroad which operated out of Cape Charles (Virginia), Newport News and Portsmouth, terminals outside of Norfolk. Customers took ferries or, later in the 20th century, buses from Norfolk to reach those other terminals. The terminal was located at 1200 East Main Street in Norfolk, near today's Harbor Park baseball stadium.

== History ==
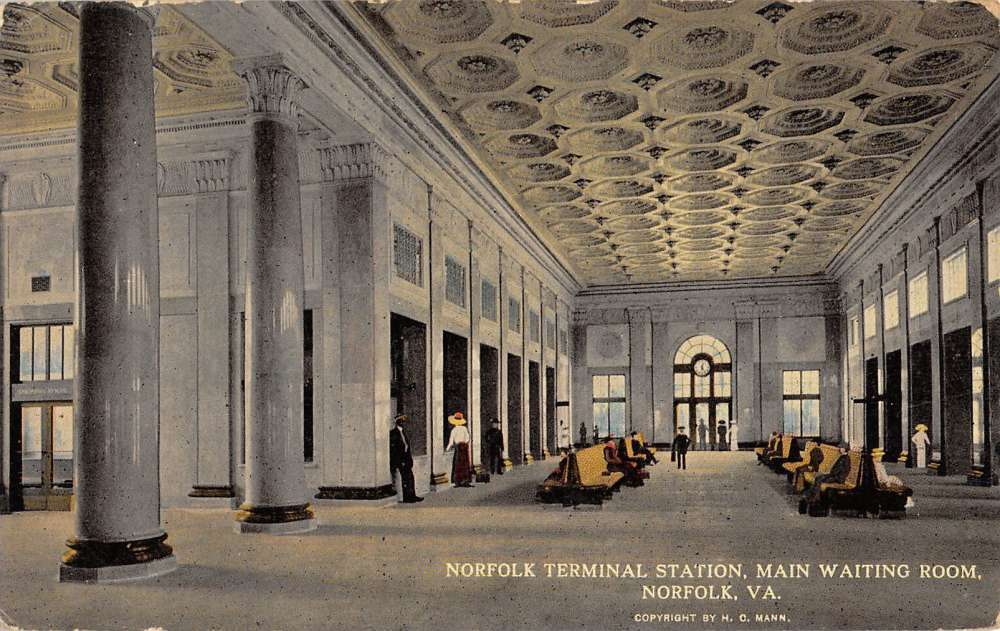
Norfolk terminal Waiting room

Norfolk Terminal Station was built following destruction by fire of the large wooden N&W passenger station on October 13, 1909. After a sharing agreement was reached and a terminal operating company were formed, the new brick building was opened in 1912. Offices of all three tenant railroads occupied the upper floors, with passenger facilities at the ground level. The General Offices of the Virginian Railway occupied the top three floors whereas N&W General Offices were located in Roanoke, Virginia.

With the decline of passenger rail travel, and the merger of the Virginian Railway into the Norfolk and Western in 1959, the station closed in 1962 and was demolished in 1963. A contract for the demolition was awarded to ABC Demolition, of Arlington, Virginia, for an undisclosed price. Passenger service moved to Lambert's Point. In 2012 Amtrak opened a new Norfolk station in the vicinity of the former Norfolk Terminal Station.

== Trains and destinations in station's heyday ==
Major Norfolk & Western trains and destinations in station's mid-20th Century prime:

- Cavalier - Cincinnati, via Petersburg, Lynchburg, Roanoke
- Pocahontas - Cincinnati, via Petersburg, Lynchburg, Roanoke
- Powhatan Arrow - Cincinnati, via Petersburg, Lynchburg, Roanoke
