= Herman H. Pevler =

Herman H. Pevler (20 April 1903 – 29 August 1978) was the tenth president of the Roanoke, VA based Norfolk and Western Railway (N&W). He had previously served as president of the Wabash Railroad, and served as president of the N&W from October 1, 1963, until his retirement in April 1970.

== Personal life ==
Commonwealth Magazine once described Pevler as "a driver who operated with doors open and coats off," citing the "sheer force of his personality" and vigor in his activities. He was an alumnus of Purdue University. He was buried in Evergreen Burial Park, Roanoke, Virginia,

== Career ==
In 1927, Herman Pevler commenced work with the Pennsylvania Railroad, and he was elected vice president of that railway in 1948.

In 1959, he was elected a director of the First National Bank in St. Louis.

Herman Pevler was the president of Wabash Railroad before he succeeded Stuart T. Saunders as President of N&W. Saunders left to head the Pennsylvania Railroad, a major N&W stockholder at that time. Pevler oversaw a complex group of mergers, which began under Saunders and merged the Nickel Plate Road, the Wabash Railroad, and portions of the Pennsylvania Railroad into the N&W company. The mergers were completed in 1964 and widely expanded the company, reaching major points such as Detroit, Chicago, and St. Louis. The latter two were major gateways and interchange points with western railroads.

Following the expansion, N&W's revenue quadrupled during Pevler's administration. Coming from the Wabash, he was the first N&W president in the 20th century to have not come up through the lower ranks of the N&W, and his leadership was met with some resistance by some N&W staff. Among his legacies was a change in N&W livery on locomotives to a blue very similar to that employed by the Wabash, which became known within the company as "Pevler blue." As his mandatory retirement age approached, it became known that Pevler intended to recommend to the board of directors a top official of another railroad as his replacement. However, quick maneuvering by N&W insiders and lobbying of key directors resulted in the selection of John P. Fishwick, a longtime N&W staff attorney who Pevler had assigned to Cleveland to oversee a subsidiary operation.

In 1959, Pevler wrote a 12-page pamphlet on Featherbedding titled The Changing Railroad Picture.

Pevler supported the Demonstration Cities and Metropolitan Development Act of 1966.

== Awards ==
In 1967, Pevler was named Roanoke's Outstanding Citizen.

Preceded by Stuart T. Saunders	President of Norfolk and Western Railway; 1963 – 1970	Succeeded by John P. Fishwick
