= Robert Hall Smith =

Robert Hall Smith (March 10, 1888 – June 18, 1960) was an American railroad executive who served as the President of the Norfolk and Western Railway (N&W) from 1946 to 1958.

== Life and career ==
Robert Hall Smith was born in Baltimore, Maryland on March 10, 1888. He grew up on a ranch in Colorado and studied engineering at Princeton University where he was a member of the university's rowing team. He joined the staff of N&W while still a student at Princeton; working as an axeman and chainman on a surveying crew in the summer of 1910. He graduated Phi Beta Kappa with a degree in civil engineering in 1911.

After earning his diploma, Smith returned to N&W where he remained employed for the rest of his career. He initially worked as a masonry inspector and transit-man before being appointed to the post of assistant roadmaster in 1913, and then roadmaster in 1914. In 1917 he became assistant superintendent of N&W's Pocahontas Division, and then was moved in the same capacity to the Radford Division in 1919. In 1922 he became superintendent of the Radford Division. He remained in that role until 1931 when he was named first general superintendent of N&W's Eastern Division, before being moved to the same role in the Western Division. In 1933 he became general manager of N&W, and in 1939 he was named vice president of the company while still remaining its general manager. On January 1, 1942 he became N&W's vice president in charge of operations. He succeeded William J. Jenks as president in 1946 and remained in that post until his retirement on March 31, 1958 when he was succeeded by Stuart T. Saunders.

Smith was a proponent of steam motive power during his tenure as president. He authorized operating tests in 1952 to compare General Motors Electro-Motive Division diesel locomotives with two N&W-designed and -built steam locomotives. He also supported the experimental coal-burning, steam-turbine electric locomotive, Jawn Henry, which the Railway tested from 1954 to 1957.

Smith's nickname "Racehorse" came from his long stride and rapid pace. The story goes that once when offered a ride to his office he declined saying that he was in a hurry. He served a term as President of the Roanoke Regional Chamber of Commerce and was a trustee of Hollins College. He was a member of the executive committee for the Roanoke Diamond Jubilee Celebration which was held in 1957. In February 1960 he was awarded the Silver Beaver Award from the Boy Scouts of America.

Smith was married to Mary Wysor of Pulaski, Virginia. The couple had five children. Their youngest child was the operatic soprano Jane Stuart Smith. He died in Roanoke on June 18, 1960.

| Preceded by William J. Jenks | President of Norfolk and Western Railway; 1946 – 1958 | Succeeded by Stuart T. Saunders |
