= Cedar, Mingo County, West Virginia =

Unincorporated community in West Virginia, United States

Cedar
- Unincorporated community
- Location within the state of West Virginia
- Coordinates: 37°33′18″N 82°6′13″W
- Country: United States
- State: West Virginia
- County: Mingo
- Elevation: 745 ft (227 m)
- Time zone: UTC-5 (Eastern (EST))
  - Summer (DST): UTC-4 (EDT)
- FIPS code: 1554089

Cedar is an unincorporated community located in Mingo County, West Virginia, United States. Its post office is closed. In early 1956, a Norfolk and Western passenger train derailed at that location.

== Geography ==
Cedar is located in the Appalachian Mountains and has an average elevation of 745 ft (227 m).
