= Stuart T. Saunders =

American railroad executive

Stuart Thomas Saunders, Sr. (July 16, 1909 – February 7, 1987) was an American railroad executive best known for his tenure with Penn Central.

== Biography ==
Saunders was born in McDowell, West Virginia, and reared near Bedford, Virginia. He graduated from Roanoke College in 1930 and from Harvard Law School in 1934. He served as chairman of Roanoke's board of trustees, was a trustee of Hollins University, and was a charter trustee of the Virginia Foundation of Independent Colleges, a fundraising entity representing Virginia's private colleges and universities. Saunders, a lawyer by trade, also served as president of the Virginia State Bar from 1951 to 1952.

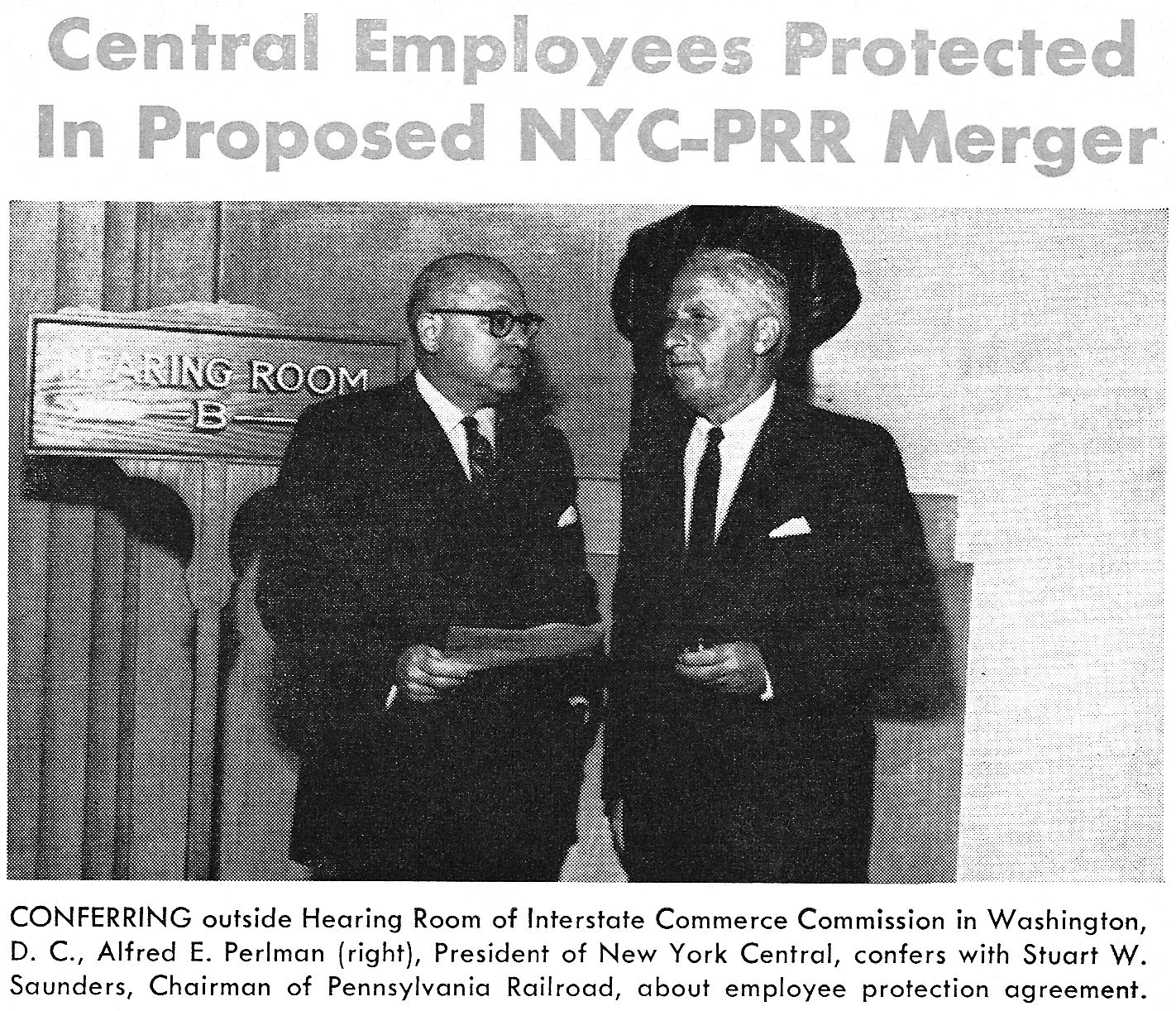
Conferring outside Hearing Room of Interstate Commerce Commission in Washington, D.C., Alfred E. Perlman (right), President of New York Central Railroad, confers with Stuart W. Saunders, Chairman of the Pennsylvania Railroad, about employee protection agreement.

=== Norfolk & Western ===
Saunders served as president of the Norfolk & Western Railway (N&W), one of the nation's most profitable railroads, from 1958 to 1963. During his tenure, the company merged with the Virginian Railway and began negotiations to merge with the Nickel Plate, Wabash Railroad and portions of the Pennsylvania Railroad (PRR) (the mergers were completed in 1964 after Saunders departed). Saunders also oversaw construction of a high-speed coal pier in Norfolk, Virginia that expanded the N&W's core activity (transporting coal from West Virginia to Hampton Roads for follow-on worldwide shipment) and he initiated conversion from steam locomotives to diesels ending the company's distinction as the nation's last steam railroad.

=== Penn Central ===
Saunders became CEO of PRR in 1963. It was during his term that the iconic Roman-inspired Pennsylvania Station in New York City was razed to make way for an underground Penn Station, topped with two office buildings and Madison Square Garden. The outcry over the destruction of the ornate structure instigated the landmarks preservation movement. Saunders also orchestrated PRR's merger with the New York Central Railroad to create Penn Central (PC), serving as that railroad's chairman and CEO. Financial difficulties forced the company into bankruptcy in 1970. Saunders was ousted during restructuring and retired.

Of the failed merger, Saunders commented "Because of the many years it took to consummate the merger, the morale of both railroads was badly disrupted and they were faced with unmanageable problems which were insurmountable. In addition to overcoming obstacles, the principal problem was too much governmental regulation and a passenger deficit which amounted to more than $100 million a year."

Saunders appeared on the January 26, 1968 cover of Time, and was the Saturday Review Businessman of the Year in 1968.

== Death ==
Saunders died of heart failure in Richmond, Virginia on February 7, 1987. He was 77 years old.

Preceded by Robert H. Smith	President of Norfolk and Western Railway; 1958 – 1963	Succeeded by Herman H. Pevler
Preceded by James M. Symes	Chief Executive Officer of Pennsylvania Railroad; 1963 – 1968	Penn Central merger
Preceded by D. William Brosnan (SOU)	Modern Railways magazine Man of the Year; 1965 – 1966	Succeeded by Louis W. Menk (NP)
New title	Chief Executive Officer of Penn Central; 1968 – 1970	Succeeded by Paul A. Gorman
