= Cavalier (N&W train) =

- "Drumhead" logos such as this often adorned the ends of observation cars on the Cavalier.

Overview
- Service type: Inter-city rail
- Status: Discontinued
- Locale: Midwest/Middle Atlantic
- First service: 1928
- Last service: 1966
- Former operator: Norfolk and Western Railway

Route
- Termini: Norfolk, Virginia; Cincinnati, Ohio
- Distance travelled: 676.6 miles (1,088.9 km)
- Service frequency: Daily
- Train number: 15/16 (1954)

On-board services
- Seating arrangements: Coaches
- Sleeping arrangements: Open sections and drawing rooms (1954)
- Catering facilities: Dining car

Technical
- Track gauge: 4 ft 8 1/2 in (1,435 mm) standard gauge

The Cavalier was one of the named passenger trains of the Norfolk and Western Railway. Originally running from Norfolk, Virginia, to Cincinnati, Ohio, by 1957 trains 15 and 16 had been cut back to a Petersburg, Virginia, to Portsmouth, Ohio run. Service to Norfolk was maintained by combining train 15 with train 27, and train 16 with train 22, the eastbound Cannonball.

Westbound, train 27 departed Norfolk at 10:15 pm and arrived at Petersburg at 12:01 am. Train 15 departed Petersburg at 12:35 am, and made selected stops before arriving at Roanoke, Virginia, at 5:15 am, and a connection with the Southern Railway's Pelican. After a 6:25 am departure from Roanoke, the Cavalier became a local, with scheduled or flag stops at most stations to Portsmouth, where it arrived at 5:45 pm.

Eastbound, departure from Portsmouth was at 12:20 pm, with an 11:35 pm arrival at Roanoke. Departing at 12:30 am, the Cavalier ran limited-stop to Petersburg, arriving at 4:55 am. The connecting Cannonball arrived at Norfolk at 7:30 am.

The Cavalier carried three sleeping cars, but not all at the same time. A Norfolk to Roanoke 10-roomette-6-double-bedroom car was carried in trains 27 and 22 from Norfolk to Petersburg and in the Cavalier from Peterburg to Roanoke. Also at Roanoke, sleeping cars were switched with the Pelican – a Petersburg to Bristol, Virginia 10-section-1-compartment-2-double-bedroom car would be exchanged for a Washington, D.C., to Williamson, West Virginia 10-roomette-6-double-bedroom car.

Also carried was a Roanoke to Williamson lounge-dining car.

Despite the small contribution they made to the Norfolk & Western's operating revenue, the company offered a wide variety of passenger trains to serve the public. Although there were relatively few people in its service area from which to draw patrons, N&W put its best foot forward. Named trains such as the Pocahontas, the Cavalier, and the famed all-coach Powhatan Arrow were but a part of a fleet including joint operations with other companies as well as branch line accommodations. However, the Cavalier ran on a more local schedule, and the Pocahantas and Powhatan Arrow made more limited stops.
