= Norfolk and Western 2300 =

American experimental steam-turbine-electric locomotive

Baldwin 6-6-6-6-4500/1-TE “Jawn Henry”
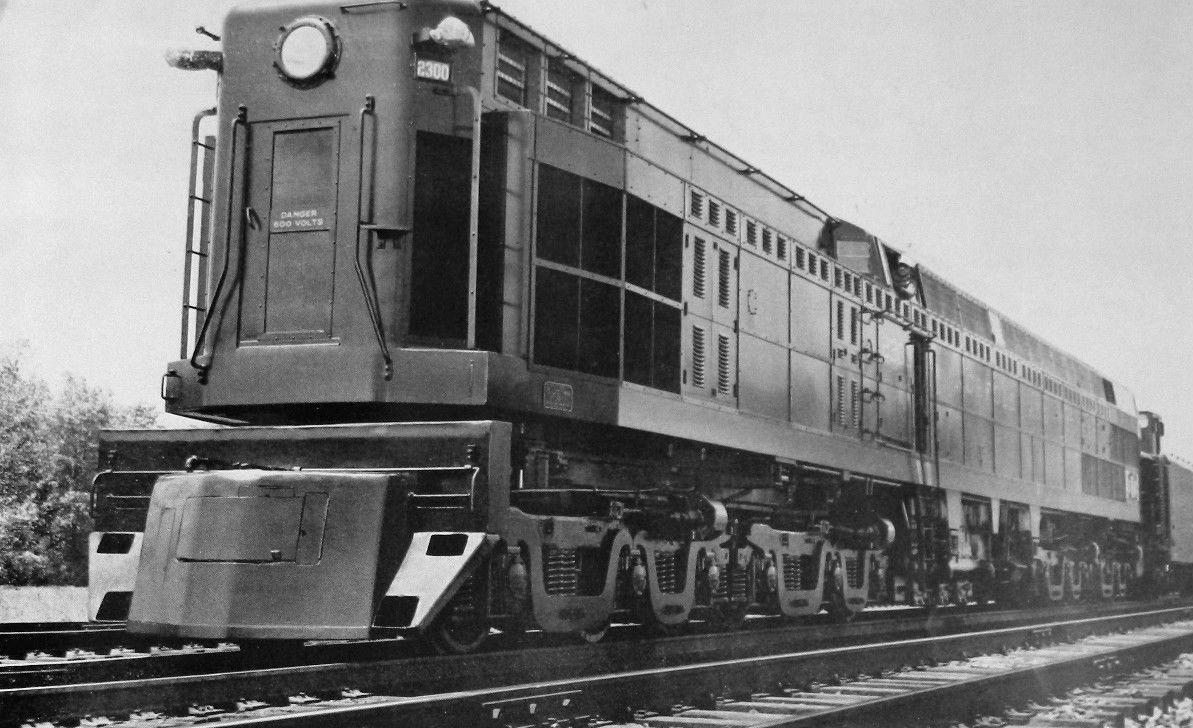
- Norfolk and Western Railway 2300 "Jawn Henry"
Type and origin
- Power type: Steam turbine electric
- Builder: Baldwin-Lima-Hamilton Corporation
- Serial number: Baldwin 75911
- Model: Baldwin 6-6-6-6-4500/1-TE
- Build date: May 1954
- Total produced: 1
Specifications
- Configuration
  - Whyte: 0-6-6-0+0-6-6-0TE
  - AAR: C+C-C+C
  - UIC: Co′Co′-Co′Co′GTurb
- Gauge: 4 ft 8 1/2 in (1,435 mm)
- Driver dia.: 42 in (1,067 mm)
- Length: Locomotive: 111 ft 7 1/2 in (34.02 m); Loco and tender: 161 ft 1 1/2 in (49.11 m)
- Tender weight: 364,100 lb (165,200 kg) (when loaded)
- Total weight: 1,182,100 lb (536,200 kg)
- Fuel type: Coal
- Fuel capacity: 20 short tons (18.1 t; 17.9 long tons)
- Water cap.: 22,000 US gal (83,000 L; 18,000 imp gal)
- Boiler pressure: 600 lbf/in^{2} (4.1 MPa)
Performance figures
- Power output: 4,500 hp (3,400 kW)
- Tractive effort: 144,000 lbf (640.54 kN) (at 9 mph (14 km/h))
Career
- Operators: Norfolk and Western Railway
- Class: TE
- Numbers: 2300
- Nicknames: Jawn Henry
- Retired: 1958
- Disposition: Scrapped

Norfolk and Western 2300, also known as the Jawn Henry, was a single experimental steam turbine locomotive of the Norfolk and Western Railway in the United States. The N&W placed it in the TE class. It was nicknamed "the Jawn Henry" after the legend of John Henry, a rock driller who famously raced against a steam drill and won, only to die immediately afterwards. It was designed to demonstrate the advantages of steam turbines espoused by Baldwin Chief Engineer Ralph P. Johnson. It was the longest steam locomotive ever built.

The unit looked similar to the Chesapeake and Ohio class M-1 turbines but differed mechanically; it was a C+C-C+C with a Babcock & Wilcox water-tube boiler with automatic controls. The boiler controls were sometimes problematic, and as with the C&O turbines coal dust and water got into the electric traction motors. Number 2300 was retired, stricken from the N&W roster on January 4, 1958, and scrapped later in 1961.

== History 1954-1961 ==
The order for the N&W 2300 was submitted to the Baldwin-Lima-Hamilton Corporation in 1954 and subsequently completed and launched in May that same year. Its boiler operated at 600 psi (4,100 kPa), more than the average ~300–330 psi (2,100–2,300 kPa) locomotives of the time. It had 175,000 lbf (780 kN) of starting tractive effort and 144,000 lbf (640 kN) at 10 mph (16 km/h). However, the design performed at a 15% speed disadvantage (over 12 mph (19 km/h)) compared to the Norfolk and Western A Class (which stopped production four years prior) and its attempt to replace the Norfolk and Western Railway's Y6b locomotives failed completely.

Other shortcomings included the very high cost of production, more than the Class A's and other competing Baldwin designs of the time. Its very complex controls took new engineers longer to learn, leading to higher downtime and training costs as well as difficulty when coupling to a train. Its size was too large for any N&W turntables and the firebox led to issues with coal dust and ash. It was retired from pulling and helping freight trains in 1958 and scrapped in 1961. The locomotive had 12 powered axles and a separate 12 wheel water tender while the C&O M1 locomotives designed to pull the Chessie Streamliner had 8 powered axles as well as a separate 12 wheel water tender.
