= Chesapeake and Ohio 490 =

Preserved American 4-6-4 locomotive

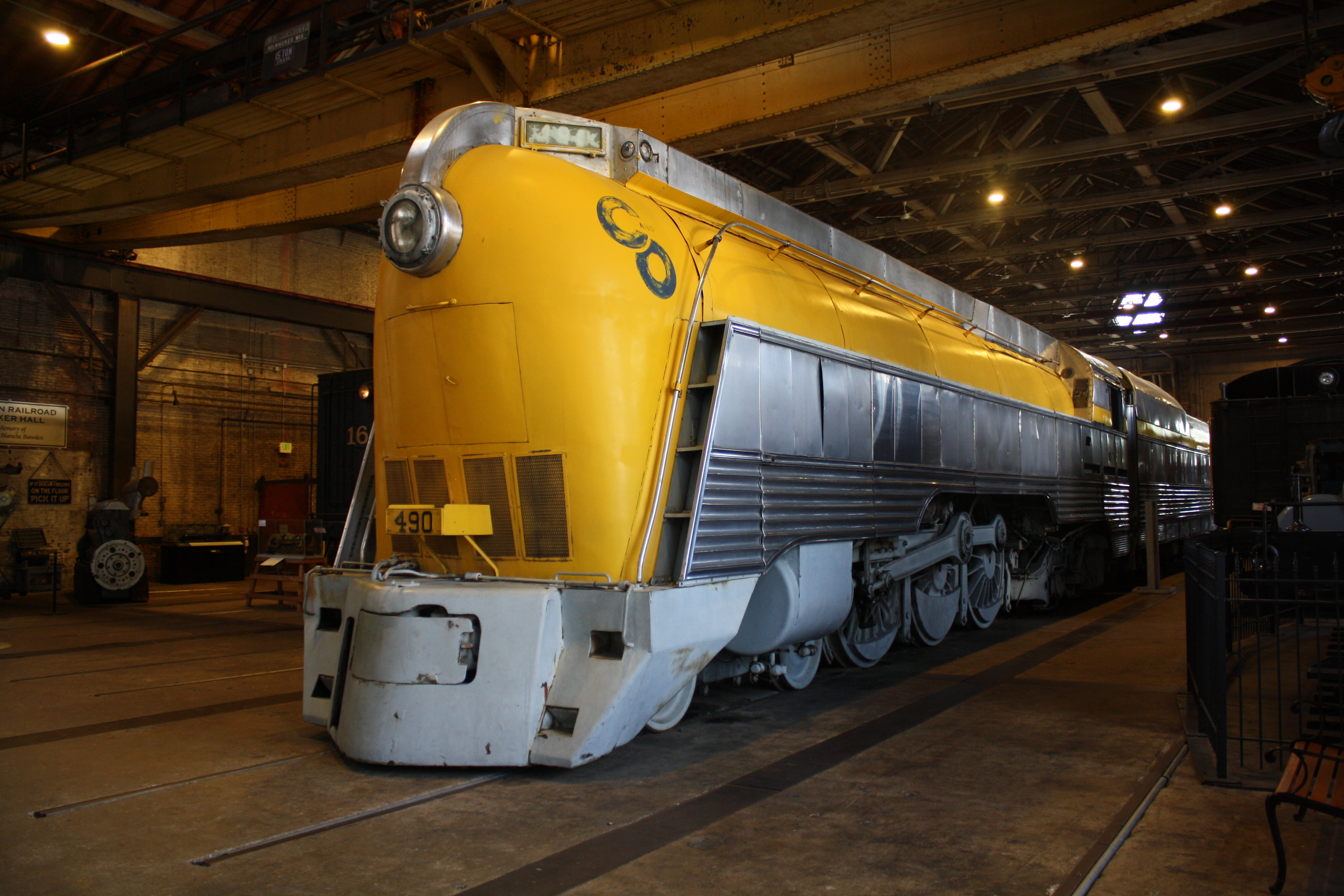
- No. 490 on static display at the B&O Railroad Museum in Baltimore (August 2022)
Type and origin
- Power type: Steam
- Builder: American Locomotive Company (Richmond works)
- Serial number: 66555
- Build date: 1926
- Rebuilder: Chesapeake and Ohio Railway
- Rebuild date: 1946
Specifications
- Configuration
  - Whyte: New: 4-6-2; Current: 4-6-4
  - UIC: New: 2'C1' h2; Current: 2'C2' h2
- Gauge: 1435
- Driver dia.: 74 in (1,900 mm)
- Wheelbase: New: 76.48 ft (23.31 m); Current: 87.77 ft (26.75 m)
  - Engine: New: 36.58 ft (11.15 m); Current: 37.96 ft (11.57 m)
  - Drivers: 13 ft (4.0 m)
- Axle load: New: 66,700 lb (30,300 kg); Current: 67,900 lb (30,800 kg)
- Adhesive weight: New: 200,000 lb (91,000 kg); Current: 202,500 lb (91,900 kg)
- Loco weight: New: 331,500 lb (150,400 kg); Current: 388,700 lb (176,300 kg)
- Tender weight: New: 347,000 lb (157,000 kg); Current: 355,300 lb (161,200 kg)
- Total weight: New: 678,500 lb (307,800 kg); Current: 744,000 lb (337,000 kg)
- Fuel type: Coal
- Fuel capacity: 28 t (28 long tons; 31 short tons)
- Water cap.: New: 12,000 US gal (45,000 L; 10,000 imp gal); Current: 18,000 US gal (68,000 L; 15,000 imp gal)
- Firebox
  - Grate area: 80.70 sq ft (7.497 m^{2})
- Boiler pressure: New: 200 psi (1,400 kPa); Current: 210 psi (1,400 kPa)
- Heating surface
  - Firebox: 281 sq ft (26.1 m^{2})
- Cylinders: Two, outside
- Cylinder size: 27 in × 28 in (690 mm × 710 mm)
- Valve gear: New: Baker; Current: Type A Poppet
- Loco brake: Air
- Train brakes: Air
Performance figures
- Maximum speed: 95 mph (153 km/h)
- Tractive effort: Old: 46,892 lbf (208.6 kN); Current: 49,237 lb (22,334 kg); Booster: 12,000 lbf (53.4 kN); Total Current: 61,237 lbf (272.4 kN)
- Factor of adh.: New: 4.27; Current: 4.11
Career
- Operators: Chesapeake and Ohio Railway
- Class: New: F-19; Current: L-1
- Number in class: 1 of 5
- Numbers: C&O 490
- Nicknames: Yellowbelly
- Retired: April 1953
- Current owner: B&O Railroad Museum
- Disposition: On static display

Chesapeake and Ohio 490 is a L-1 class 4-6-4 "Hudson" type steam locomotives built by the ALCO's Richmond works in 1926 originally as an F-19 class 4-6-2 "Pacific" type to be used to pull the Chesapeake and Ohio's secondary passenger trains. It was eventually rebuilt in 1946 to become a streamlined 4-6-4 for the C&O's Chessie streamliner.

After the Chessie was cancelled, No. 490 remained in secondary passenger service, until it was retired in 1953. It spent several years in storage in Huntington, West Virginia, until 1968, when it was donated to the B&O Railroad Museum in Baltimore, Maryland. It remains on static display at the museum, as of 2026.

== History ==
Throughout the 1910s and 1920s, the Chesapeake and Ohio Railway (C&O) acquired multiple 4-6-2 "Pacific" and 4-8-2 "Mountain"-type locomotives for use in pulling their heavy passenger trains. Since some of the C&O's main passenger routes traveled over mountainous grades in the Blue Ridge and Allegheny Mountains, the trains often required doubleheading 4-6-2s and 4-8-2s. In 1926, the C&O approached the American Locomotive Company's (ALCO) Richmond, Virginia works, and ordered a new class of 4-6-2s, the F-19 class. The F-19s, Nos. 490-494, were the final new 4-6-2s the C&O received (later 4-6-2s would be purchased second-hand from the Richmond, Fredericksburg and Potomac Railroad (RF&P).

No. 490 was the first locomotive of the class, and it was initially assigned to pull mainline trains on flat portions of the C&O system east of Charlottesville, Virginia. In 1930, No. 490 was assigned to pull the C&O's premiere passenger train, The Sportsman between Washington, D.C. and Cincinnati, Ohio, as well as the George Washington between D.C. and Louisville, Kentucky. In 1933, No. 490's original Vanderbilt tender was swapped for a modern VA tender to increase its water capacity by 6,000 gallons.

By the early 1940s, No. 490 was reassigned to secondary passenger service after the C&O had ordered larger 4-8-4 "Greenbrier" locomotives for their mountainous passenger operations. After World War II, most of the C&O's 4-6-2s and 4-8-2s were found to be worn out. Concurrently, C&O president Robert R. Young authorized for a new steam-powered passenger train to be developed to demonstrate coal as an alternative to diesel power. The train was planned to be called the Chessie, and it was to be mainly hauled by M-1 class steam turbine locomotives between D.C. and Cincinnati. The C&O also decided to rebuild their F-19 locomotives as 4-6-4 "Hudsons" to haul the Chessie feeder trains out of Newport News, Virginia and Louisville.

The railway sent No. 490 to their Huntington, West Virginia shops in 1946. No. 490's original Baker valve gear was replaced with Franklyn type A poppet valve gear, an extra trailing axle was added beneath the new, larger firebox, the locomotive received roller bearings, it received a front-end throttle, it received a high-speed booster, it received a cross counterbalance, it became shrouded with fluted, stainless steel streamlining akin to that on the M-1s, and it was reclassified as an L-1. The other F-19s went through the same rebuilding process, but No. 494 became the only L-1 without streamlining.

By 1948, passenger traffic on the C&O slowly declined, and due to how costly the Chessie was planned to be, it was cancelled before service was planned to begin. While equipment for the train was being auctioned off, No. 490 and the other L-1s subsequently proceeded to pull secondary passenger trains and mail trains alongside the L-2 class 4-6-4s, despite having already been modified for premiere passenger service. Since their new streamlined looks were mostly yellow, the L-1s were nicknamed "Yellowbellies" by crews.

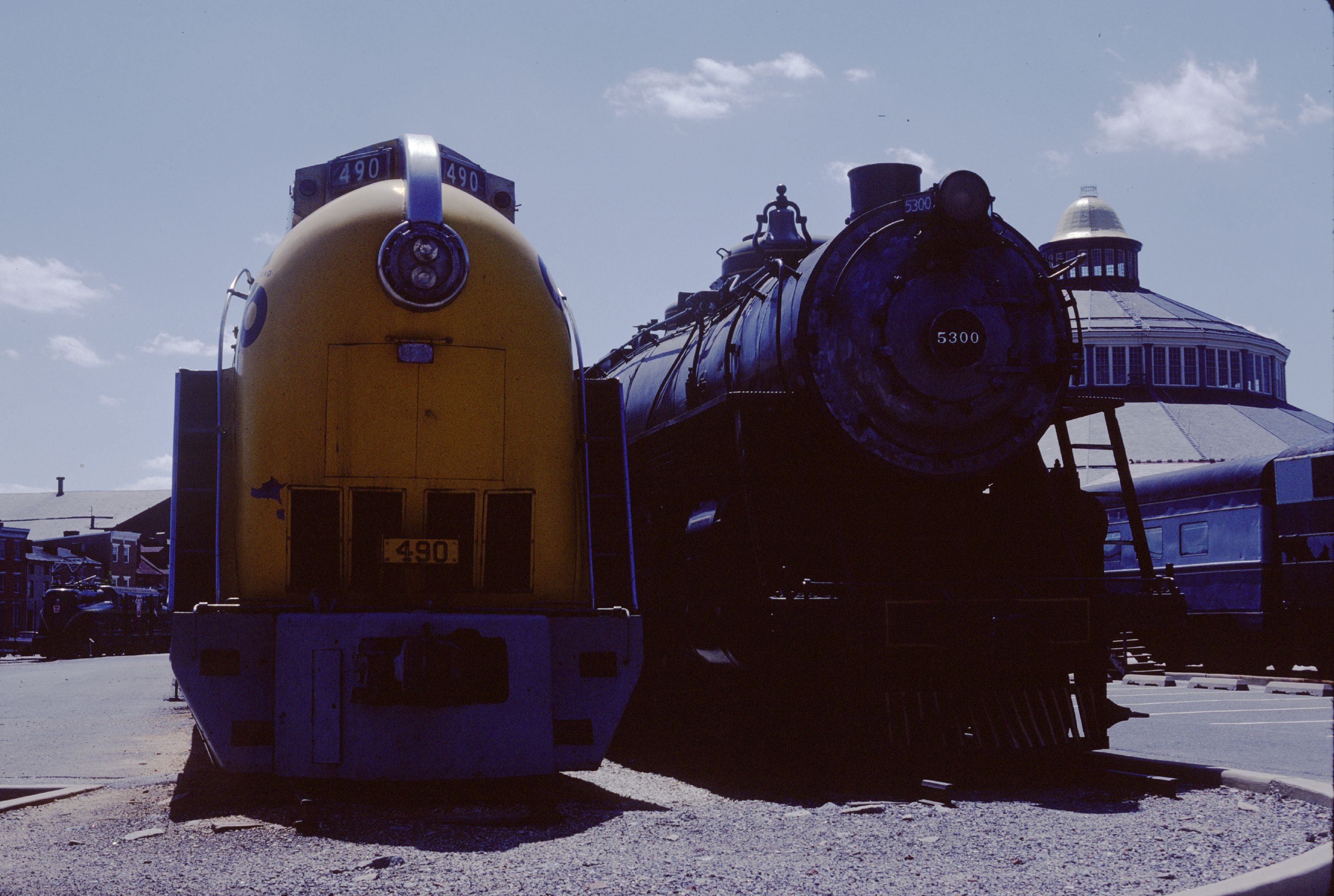
No. 490 displayed with Baltimore and Ohio 5300 in 1984

Following a major coal strike in 1949, the C&O's newest president, Walter J. Tuohy, began to dieselize the C&O's operations, with EMD E8s being ordered to cover their passenger trains. 1953 was the final year No. 490 operated under its own power, as it hauled the final scheduled steam-powered passenger train on the C&O in April of that year before it was retired. No. 490 spent the next fifteen years being stored in Huntington, and by the end of the 1950s, No. 490 became the last remaining C&O 4-6-4, as all of the other L-1s and L-2s were scrapped.

In 1968, the C&O donated No. 490 to the B&O Railroad Museum with the hopes of putting it on static display. A cosmetic restoration took place in 1971, and the locomotive was subsequently moved to the museum's property in Baltimore. Since its arrival at the museum, No. 490 would spend several decades being left on static display outdoors alongside other locomotives. The last remaining L-1 would slowly deteriorate as a result of being exposed to the elements, but museum volunteers have given the locomotive one cosmetic repaint in the early 1990s. In 2005, No. 490 was moved inside one of the museum's buildings to be protected from further deterioration. As of 2024, No. 490 remains on static display inside one of the museum's buildings, waiting for another eventual cosmetic refurbishment.

== See also ==
- Baltimore and Ohio 5300
- Chesapeake and Ohio 614
- Chesapeake and Ohio 2716
- Chicago, Burlington and Quincy 4000
