= GE steam turbine locomotives =

Steam turbine locomotives

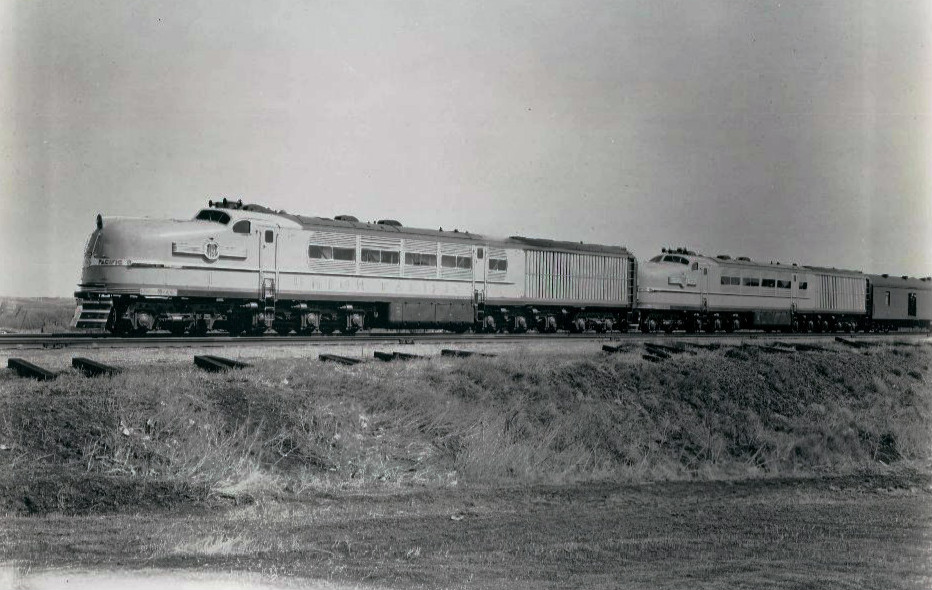
- Union Pacific's General Electric steam turbine locomotives, circa April 1939
Type and origin
- Power type: Steam turbine
- Designer: General Electric
- Builder: General Electric
- Build date: 1938
- Total produced: 2
Specifications
- Configuration
  - Whyte: 4-6-0+0-6-4T
  - AAR: 2+C-C+2
- Gauge: 4 ft 8 1/2 in (1,435 mm)
- Leading dia.: 36 inches (910 mm)
- Driver dia.: 44 inches (1,100 mm)
- Trailing dia.: 36 inches (910 mm)
- Length: 90 feet 10 inches (27.69 m)
- Width: 10 feet (3.0 m)
- Height: 15 feet 3/4 inch (4.591 m)
- Loco weight: 548,000 pounds (249,000 kg)
- RPM range: 12,500
- Head end power: Yes
- Boiler pressure: 1,500 pounds per square inch (10,000 kPa)–1,600 pounds per square inch (11,000 kPa)
Performance figures
- Maximum speed: 125 miles per hour (201 km/h)
- Power output: 2,500 horsepower (1,900 kW)
- Tractive effort: Starting: 86,500 pounds-force (385,000 N); Continuous: 32,000 pounds-force (140,000 N)–40,500 pounds-force (180,000 N)
Career
- Operators: Union Pacific; New York Central; Great Northern
- Locale: United States
- Delivered: April 1939
- Withdrawn: June 1939 (UP); 1943 (GN)
- Disposition: Both scrapped

The General Electric steam turbine locomotives were two steam turbine locomotives built by General Electric (GE) for Union Pacific (UP) in 1938. The two units were streamlined, 90 feet 10 inches (27.69 m) in length, capable of producing 2,500 horsepower (1,900 kW), and reputedly able to attain speeds of 125 miles per hour (201 km/h). Stylistically, they resembled UP's Pullman-designed M-10003 through M-10006 power units and contemporary Electro-Motive Corporation (EMC) diesel designs.

The two locomotives were delivered to UP in April 1939, and they completed test runs and participated in a variety of publicity events for the railroad, including the grand opening of the Los Angeles Union Passenger Terminal, the world premiere of Cecil B. DeMille's film Union Pacific, and an inspection by President Franklin D. Roosevelt. While the locomotives displayed excellent acceleration and could maintain schedules better than conventional steam locomotives, they were also unreliable and expensive to maintain. They never entered regular revenue service.

In June 1939, UP returned the locomotives to GE. By December 1941, the railroad had abandoned the project. In 1941, the GE steam turbine locomotives were tested by the New York Central, and they were operated by the Great Northern in 1943 during the World War II "power crunch" (a lack of sufficient locomotives to sustain regular operations) before being retired from service later that year. They were scrapped before the end of World War II.

== Background ==
Development of the General Electric (GE) steam turbine locomotives began in late 1936, when GE and the Union Pacific (UP) began collaborating on an oil-powered steam turbine-electric design that they termed a "steam-electric locomotive". To produce an altogether new type of locomotive, GE hoped to adapt mature steam turbine technology from maritime and stationary applications for railroad use. Early GE specifications detailed a streamlined shape, 2+C-C+2 wheel arrangement, and production of 2,500 horsepower (1,900 kW) and 81,000 pounds-force (360,000 N) of starting tractive effort (the force generated by a locomotive's prime mover in order to generate motion through tractive force).

GE had hoped to deliver a prototype steam turbine locomotive to UP in 1937, but none were completed until December 1938, and were delivered for testing in spring 1939. In total, the two prototype locomotives had taken almost two years to complete.

== Design ==
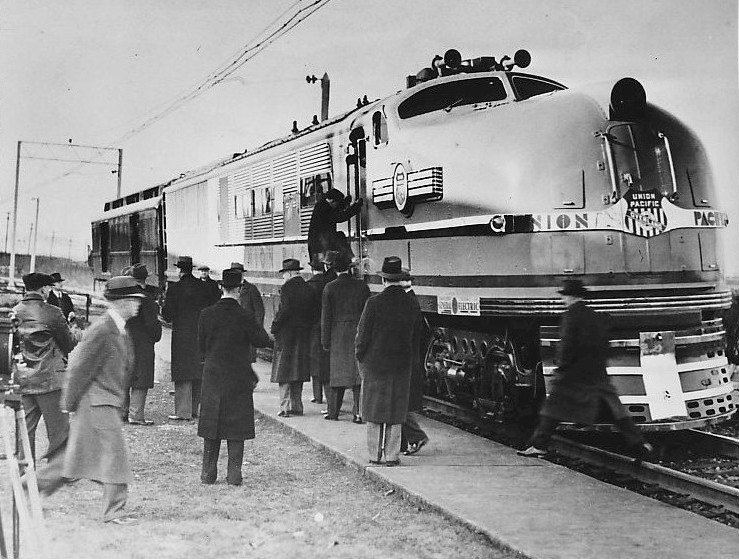
A GE steam turbine locomotive on a test run in 1938

GE's new steam turbine locomotives featured streamlined bodies with an appearance somewhat similar to contemporary EMC diesel streamliner designs. The GE locomotives had lightweight bodies consisting of steel frames covered with riveted sheet metal, most of which was made of aluminum. They also had elevated cabs, similar to those of UP's Pullman-designed M-10003 through M-10006, which afforded greater visibility. The noses were significantly longer than those on the Pullman units, at 9 feet (2.7 m), which afforded safety for operating crews. In total, each unit measured 90 feet 10 inches (27.69 m) in length, 10 feet (3.0 m) in width (at the cab), and 15 feet 3/4 inch (4.591 m) in height.

The February 1939 issue of General Electric Review claimed that each of the steam turbine locomotives could attain speeds of 125 miles per hour (201 km/h) and that they had twice a conventional steam locomotive's thermal efficiency. The two units built for UP were streamlined and capable of producing 2,500 horsepower (1,900 kW), and had been designed to operate together "elephant style", nose to tail. Fully loaded, each of the two locomotives weighed 548,000 pounds (249,000 kg). Each could produce 86,500 pounds-force (385,000 N) of starting tractive effort, and between 32,000 and 40,500 pounds-force (142,000 and 180,000 N) of continuous tractive effort, depending on the amount of cooling.

Both of the locomotives had Babcock & Wilcox water-tube boilers, as well as specialized Bailey Meter Company equipment designed to automatically fire and regulate the boiler. Each boiler regularly operated at 920 °F (493 °C) and 1,500 pounds per square inch (10,000 kPa) to 1,600 pounds per square inch (11,000 kPa), a boiler pressure higher than that of any extant steam locomotive and much higher than contemporary conventional steam locomotives. The GE locomotives stored enough oil to give them an operating range of 500 miles (800 km) to 700 miles (1,100 km).

The turbines were designed to operate at 12,500 rpm and were paired with a generator set with a 10:1 reduction gearing. A twin-armature DC generator was used to power the traction motors, while a three-phase, 220-volt AC generator powered auxiliary functions such as traction motor blowers and providing head-end power. The latter, which provided lighting, heating, and air conditioning to passenger cars, was unusual in 1939 and would not become standard until the 1970s.

Another notable feature was dynamic brakes, where some (or most) braking is created by running the traction motors in reverse as generators, and then dissipating that electric power in resistors to produce heat. In this case, the heat was generated in the locomotive as opposed to the roof-top open-air coolers on most modern locomotives. The resistors were cooled by water from the steam loop, thus heating it. This allowed the braking energy to be recaptured into motive power, or as it is more typically known, offered regenerative braking.

The locomotives also used a gear ratio of 65:31, as well as driving wheels with a diameter of 44 inches (1,100 mm) and 36-inch (910 mm)-diameter guide and trailing wheels. Each also had a 2+C-C+2 wheel arrangement, or 4-6-0-0-6-4T in Whyte notation. Although sold to UP together and promoted as a single 5,000-horsepower (3,700 kW) locomotive, the two units were capable of operation independently of each other.

== Operation ==
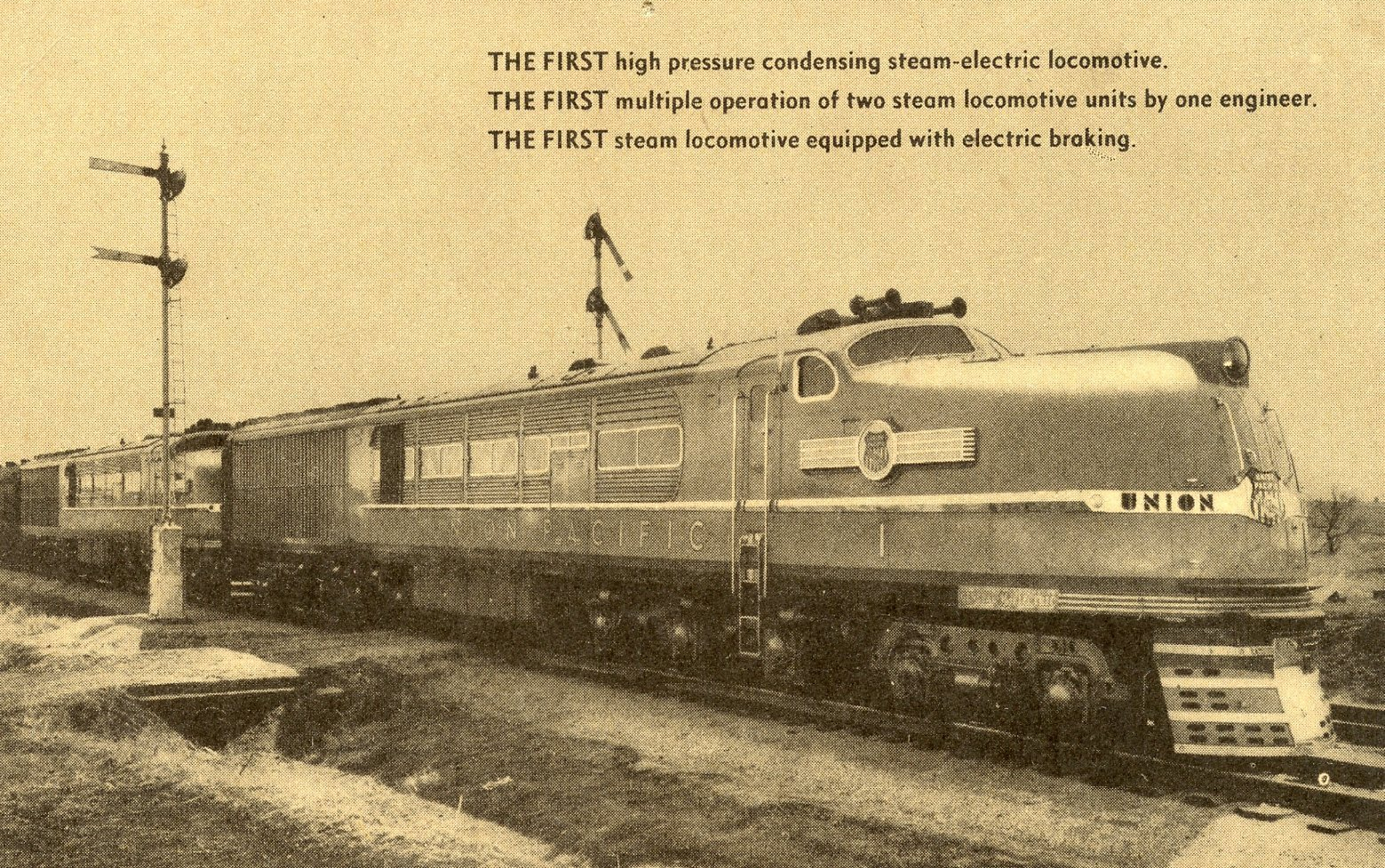
A circa-1939 postcard touting the GE steam turbine locomotives' "firsts", including first multiple operation of two steam locomotives by a single engineer

The locomotives were in operation for six months, among the shortest operational careers in recorded railroading. After being completed in December 1938, they were first tested by GE at its Erie, Pennsylvania facility, then road tested on New York Central tracks between January and March 1939. They were then delivered to UP in April 1939 at Omaha, Nebraska, in time for the 70th anniversary of the completion of the first transcontinental railroad in May, and given road numbers 1 and 2. According to UP historians William Kratville and Harold Ranks, the new locomotives were hoped to be the "replacement to steam" and the "successor of diesels". After completing test runs, UP put the locomotives on public display with tour trains, a national tour, and an inspection by President Franklin D. Roosevelt. They were present at the grand opening of the Los Angeles Union Passenger Terminal and were on display in Omaha for the world premier of Cecil B. DeMille's film Union Pacific on April 28.

During test runs, the locomotives displayed excellent acceleration and an ability to maintain schedules better than conventional steam engines, although they also had serious reliability problems and relatively high maintenance costs. On one occasion, the two locomotives failed while hauling a train from Colorado to Omaha, necessitating a 2800-class Pacific steam locomotive to pull them along with the rest of the train for the remainder of the journey. The locomotives worked on several routes in a variety of different capacities, including both passenger and perishable freight service, although they never entered regular revenue service; in June 1939, the railroad returned them to GE in Chicago for what UP president W. M. Jeffers called "necessary modification and/or reconstruction".

While UP retained interest in the concept of steam turbine locomotives for the next two years, in December 1941 it decided to end its agreement with GE. Rail transport author Brian Solomon opines that this was due to the development of other types of locomotives, particularly the 4-8-8-4 "Big Boy" steam locomotives, EMD E-units, and EMD FT freight diesels, as well as a potential personnel change in the railroad's motive power department in 1939.

GE continued to work on its steam turbine locomotives after UP lost interest. In 1941, the New York Central tested them along its Water Level Route in New York. During the "power crunch" on American railroads caused by World War II, in 1943 the steam turbine locomotives were operated by the Great Northern between Spokane and Wenatchee, Washington. By that point, they had been repainted a dark gray, and renumbered GE-1 and GE-2. According to a number of sources, including The Streamliner, they provided satisfactory service for GN. By late 1943, the locomotives were retired from service and returned to GE. They were scrapped before the end of World War II.

== Legacy ==
The GE steam turbine locomotives were both the first turbine locomotives to be built in North America as well as GE's only steam-powered locomotives.

In the words of history professor and author Jeffrey W. Schramm, the locomotives "were the most ambitious and technologically advanced locomotives to have traveled American rails to that point." UP historian Alfred Bruce described the design as "one of the most exceptional steam locomotives ever built".

UP steam turbine locomotives #1 and #2 have been reproduced in model form by Overland Models.

== See also ==
- Chesapeake and Ohio class M-1
