= Up to eleven =

Popular culture idiom

The original "up to eleven" knobs in the 1984 film This Is Spinal Tap

"Up to eleven", also phrased as "these go to eleven", is an idiom from popular culture describing something that is up to or beyond the maximum threshold, or to an extremely high or strong degree. The phrase originates from the 1984 film This Is Spinal Tap, where guitarist Nigel Tufnel demonstrates a guitar amplifier whose volume knobs are marked from zero to eleven, instead of the usual zero to ten.

In 2002, the phrase entered the Shorter Oxford English Dictionary with the definition "up to maximum volume".

== Original scene from This Is Spinal Tap ==
The phrase was coined in a scene from the 1984 rock mockumentary This Is Spinal Tap by the character Nigel Tufnel, played by Christopher Guest. In this scene, Nigel gives the rockumentary's director, Marty DiBergi, played by Rob Reiner, a tour of his stage equipment. While Nigel is showing Marty his Marshall guitar amplifiers, he points out a selection whose control knobs all have a highest setting of eleven, unlike standard amplifiers whose volume settings are typically numbered from 0 to 10. Believing that this numbering increases the highest volume of the amp, he explains, "It's one louder, isn't it?" When Marty asks why not simply make the 10 setting louder, Nigel hesitates before responding: "These go to eleven."

== Prior examples ==
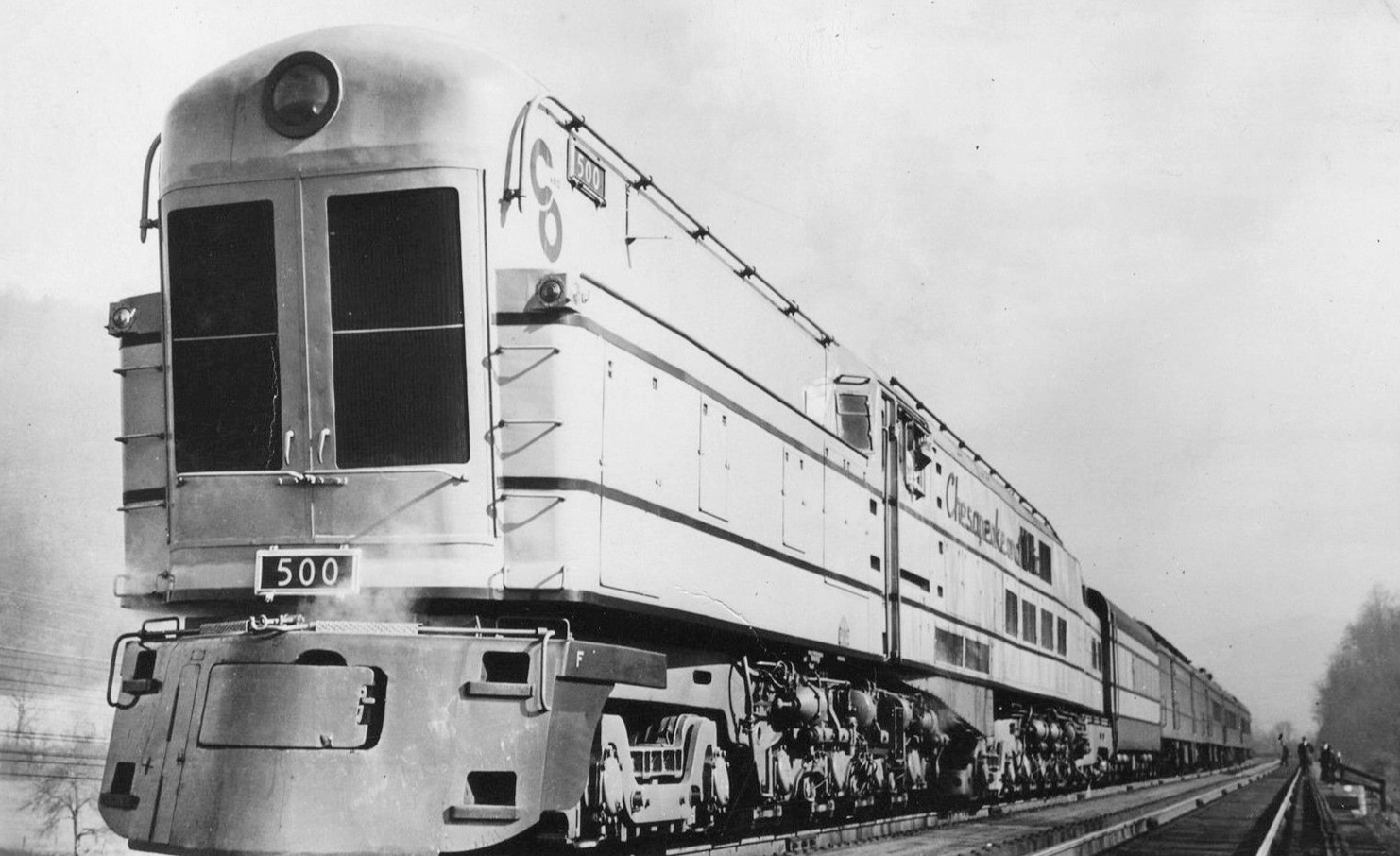
C&O's No. 500 first went "up to 11" in 1947.

The use of 11 as a maximum pre-dates This Is Spinal Tap by almost 40 years. In 1947, the Baldwin Locomotive Works and the Chesapeake and Ohio Railway introduced the Chesapeake and Ohio class M-1 steam turbine locomotive. The locomotive's throttle included eleven settings, ranging from one (idling) to eleven (full speed). The locomotive's cruising speed was 70 miles per hour (113 km/h), at which point the throttle was on "seven". During a trial run with a reporter from Popular Mechanics aboard, a C&O engineer expressed his dissatisfaction with a local speed limit of 75 miles per hour (121 km/h), noting that he would "Sure like to be able to pull it back to eleven!"

Gibson Les Paul guitars with low-impedance pickups were outfitted with special controls designed by Les Paul himself. Controls included a "Decade" switch that went up to 11.

== Subsequent examples ==
As a consequence of the film, real bands and musicians started buying equipment whose knobs went up to 11, or even higher, with Eddie Van Halen reputedly being the first to do so. Marshall, the company that provided amplifiers for the film that the custom-marked knobs were applied to, now sells amplifiers such as its JCM900 (first sold in 1990) whose knobs are marked from 0 to 20. The QSC 3500 and 3800 amplifiers made for the professional sound company Sound Image in the 1990s went to 11, as do amps from Soldano and Friedman.

Other controls with a maximum of 11 include SSL mixing consoles, Amazon Alexa, the BBC's iPlayer on demand video player, the headphone volume control on the PreSonus AudioBox 1818VSL, the volume control on the Apogee Mini-DAC, the IRIX audio panel (when invoked with the undocumented -spinaltap option), and the Tesla Model S's volume control. The tachometer on a Singer Vehicle Design modified Porsche 911 goes up to 11, representing 11,000 RPM. The "Drive" knob of the Elektron Syntakt drum computer and synthesizer goes from 0 to 11 with 1 in the middle, using 0—1 for normal clean audio levels followed by 10 additional steps of distorted range.

On its primary page for This Is Spinal Tap, the IMDb website and mobile app display the user rating for the film out of 11 stars (e.g., 7.9/11) instead of the standard scale of one to ten. Users can only rate the film on a scale of one to ten, and other IMDb pages display the rating on a ten-point scale.

The volume controls for video playback on the BBC News website and BBC iPlayer go up to 11.

The influence of the phrase "up to eleven" is such that it has been used outside of music; in 2016, for example, astronomer Krzysztof Stanek described the then brightest-known object in the universe, ASASSN-15lh, as being "as if nature took everything we know about magnetars and turned it up to 11".

== See also ==
- Loudest band (list)
- Loudness war – Increasing audio levels in recorded music
- Red line (phrase) – Figurative phrase meaning a limit, "a limit past which safety can no longer be guaranteed"
- Plaid Speed – In the film Spaceballs, the consequence of exceeding the red line of Ludicrous Speed
