= SNCF 232.Q.1 =

French experimental steam locomotive

Type and origin
- Power type: Steam
- Builder: Schneider et Cie
- Serial number: 4647
- Build date: June 1940
- Total produced: 1
Specifications
- Configuration
  - Whyte: 4-6-4
  - UIC: 2′Co2′ turb.
- Gauge: 1,435 mm (4 ft 8 1/2 in)
- Driver dia.: 1.500 m (4 ft 11 in)
- Wheelbase: 21.270 m (69 ft 9 1/2 in)
  - Engine: 12.720 m (41 ft 8 3/4 in)
  - Leading: 2.300 m (7 ft 6 1/2 in)
  - Drivers: 4.040 m (13 ft 3 in)
  - Trailing: 2.000 m (6 ft 6 3/4 in)
  - Tender: 6.100 m (20 ft 1/4 in)
  - Tender bogie: 2.000 m (6 ft 6 3/4 in)
- Length: Locomotive: 15.740 m (51 ft 7 3/4 in); Loco+tender: 25.200 m (82 ft 8 1/4 in)
- Loco weight: 122 tonnes (120 long tons; 134 short tons)
- Tender weight: 67.5 tonnes (66.4 long tons; 74.4 short tons)
- Fuel capacity: Coal
- Water cap.: 30,000 litres (6,600 imp gal; 7,900 US gal)
- Tender cap.: 6 tonnes (5.9 long tons; 6.6 short tons)
- Firebox
  - Type
  - Grate area: 4.90 m^{2} (52.7 sq ft)
- Boiler pressure: 25 kg/cm^{2} (2.45 MPa; 356 psi)
- Heating surface: 211.0 m^{2} (2,271 sq ft)
- Superheater
  - Heating area: 89.0 m^{2} (958 sq ft)
Performance figures
- Maximum speed: 130 km/h (81 mph)
- Power output: 2,600 CV (1,900 kW; 2,600 hp)
Career
- Operators: SNCF
- Class: 232.Q
- Nicknames: Locatu
- Disposition: Scrapped

The SNCF 232.Q.1 was an experimental prototype steam locomotive of the Société nationale des chemins de fer français (SNCF) which entered service in 1940. It was Baltic or 4-6-4 locomotive.

== Origins ==
The locomotive was ordered on 9 March 1936 by the Société nationale des chemins de fer français in an attempt to solve the problem of the crankshaft which limited, in part, the speed of the locomotive and its inherent dynamic augment or hammer blow.

The order for its construction was placed with the firm of Schneider et Cie.

== Description ==
It was decided to equip the locomotive with a conventional high-pressure boiler and individual turbines for the axles.

The boiler chosen was of the classic fire-tube type. This boiler was pressed to 25 kg/cm^{2} (2.45 MPa; 356 psi), the maximum pressure for this type of boiler, unlike 232.P.1 which had a water-tube boiler pressed to 60 kg/cm^{2} (5.88 MPa; 853 psi).

The turbines, three in number, powered the driving axles via a Westinghouse-type elastic link. They had a maximum speed of 10,000 rpm at a speed of 140 km/h (87 mph). This drive system had the advantage of dispensing with the connecting rods, thus eliminating any oscillating motion and the hammer blow on the track.

Due to the absence of connecting rods, the locomotive had outside frames. It was also fitted with an integral fairing.

== Service history ==
The locomotive was rolled out of the Schneider et Cie's Creusot factory in early June 1940, and commenced testing. However, the Battle of France quickly caused the tests to be suspended, and the locomotive went into store in the manufacturer's workshops as early as 12 June. The tests resumed later in September, before they were moved to the Vitry-sur-Seine test plant in October 1940. The first series of tests showed that the locomotive was very quiet and very stable. From 16 January 1942, the locomotive was used to haul workers' trains in the Creusot area, and regular trains between Paris and Dijon. Damage to the central turbine forced its return the manufacturer, where it survived its first bombardment without damage. Subsequently, it was moved to Laumes depot, where it survived a second bombardment unscathed. Finally, it was sabotaged by the retreating German Army in August 1944. While deemed repairable, authorisation for its restoration was refused on 8 August 1946. Authorisation for retirement was granted in April 1947, and it was struck from the roster in January 1948.

== Conclusion ==
The locomotive was designed to reduce the number of moving parts, and to give a smoother ride. However, the delay caused by the Second World War and the SNCF's choice of electric traction, meant that the good results obtained did not secure a future for steam traction. Parallels can be drawn with the other prototypes that finally came too late: 2-232.P.1, 3-242.A.1, and 4-160.A.1.

== Tender ==
The tender coupled to 232.Q.1 was an ex-PLM 30.A bogie type that had a capacity of 30,000 litres (6,600 imp gal; 7,900 US gal) of water and 6 tonnes (5.9 long tons; 6.6 short tons) of coal. It was fitted with a steam-driven coal pusher to ease the task of the fireman.
