= Loudest band =

Disputed claim

The loudest band in the world is a subject of some dispute in musical circles. Many bands have claimed to be the loudest, measuring this in various ways including with decibel meters at concerts and by engineering analysis of the CDs on which their albums are published. The Guinness World Records no longer recognizes "The Loudest Band in the World" for fear of promoting hearing loss.

== By observation and reputation ==
Some bands, groups, and orchestral performances have at times been described as extraordinarily loud by subjective opinion of reviewers, but not by actual measured decibel levels.

=== 19th century ===
Volume in classical music is determined to some degree by the score, rather than the ensemble. However, many of the loudest performances have been determined by the size, instrumentation, inclination, and location of the orchestra, assuming a piece which is written to be loud.

One hundred musicians played at the 1813 premiere of Beethoven's work Wellington's Victory, which Corinna da Fonseca-Wollheim described as a "sonic assault on the listener" and the "beginning of a musical arms race for ever louder... symphonic performance", quoting an unnamed attendee as remarking that the performance was "seemingly designed to make the listener as deaf as its composer". Frédéric Döhl described performances of this work as "not like an evening at the Berlin Philharmonie, but rather like a modern-day rock concert". According to da Fonseca-Wollheim, music continued to grow louder after this as the world grew louder, partly due to developments in instrumentation (steel strings, metal flutes, valves on trumpets).

The opening day of the 1869 National Peace Jubilee in Boston featured a performance of the Anvil Chorus that featured thousands of musicians, including 50 firemen pounding anvils as well as cannon and church bells.

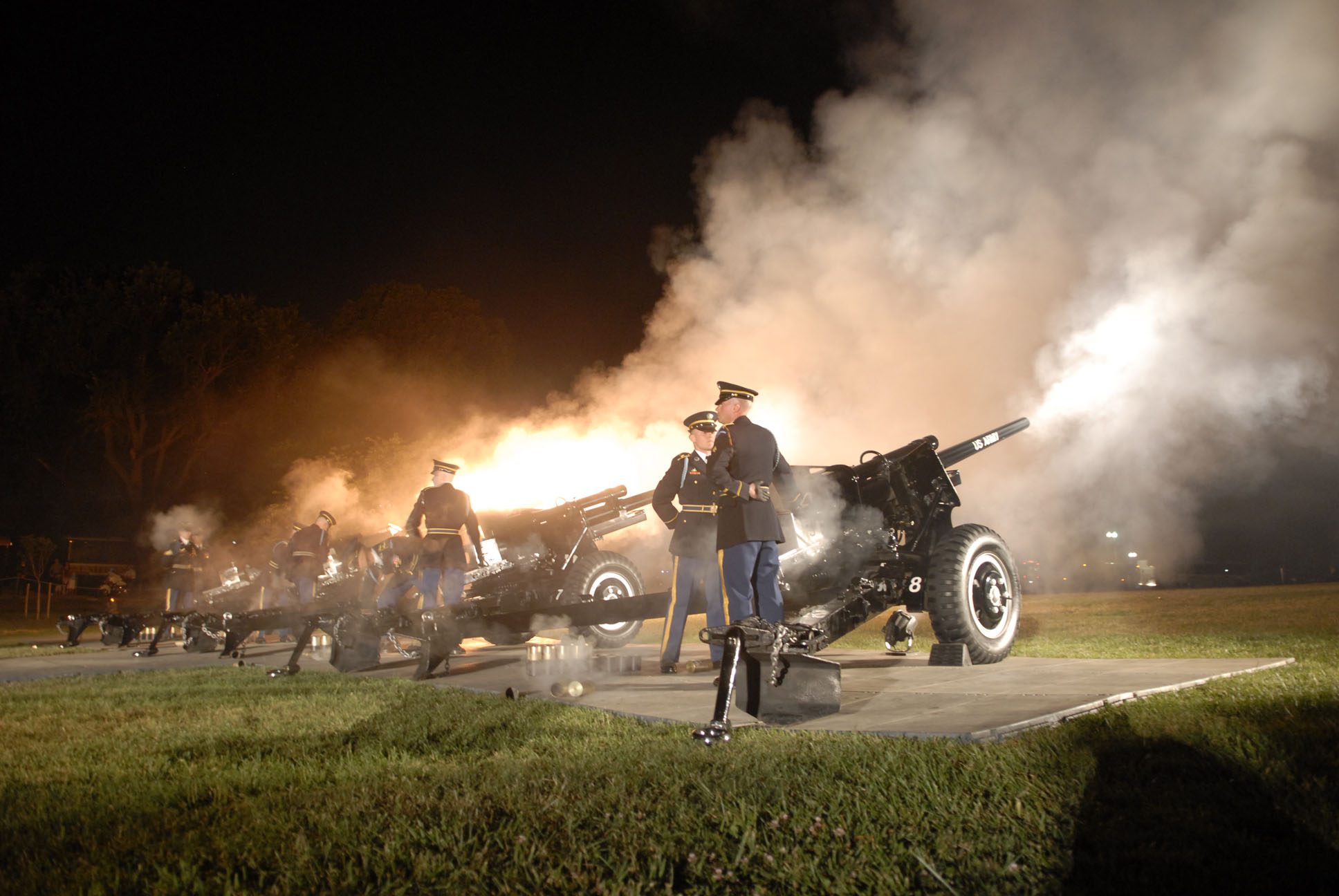
Performance of the 1812 Overture by the United States Army Band, 2008

Tchaikovsky's 1880 work 1812 Overture, which is scored for artillery and has passages marked as ffff (in a score, "fortississimo" (fff) instructs the musicians to play the marked passage extremely loudly and is normally the loudest volume specified; "fortissississimo" (ffff), which means to play louder than fortississimo, is sometimes used) has been described as the loudest classical piece. The piece has been played with FH70 155 mm (6.1 in) howitzers and Type 74 Main Battle Tanks included in the orchestra instrumentation (a typical 155mm howitzer generates about 180 dB at the source, sufficient to sometimes cause immediate and permanent hearing damage (artillery crews are issued hearing protection)). The piece is usually performed outdoors or with simulated or recorded cannons, but an indoor performance with live cannon at the Royal Albert Hall has been cited as having been particularly loud.

=== Early 20th century ===
Pluck the string so hard that it hits the wood.

— Gustav Mahler, instruction in the score of Symphony No. 7 (1904–05), which includes an fffff passage, albeit for strings rather than brass

The "Mars" movement of Gustav Holst's 1918 work The Planets includes ffff passages. The close of the finale of the 1919 suite of Stravinsky's 1910 work The Firebird is scored at ffff, as are passages of other works.

According to James R. Oestreich (writing in 2004), modern symphony orchestras can easily reach 96 to 98 decibels, and certain brass and percussion instruments have registered 130 to 140 at close range.

=== 1948 ===
Kids are going haywire over the sheer noise of this band... There is a danger of an entire generation growing up with the idea that jazz and the atom bomb are essentially the same natural phenomenon.

— Barry Ulanov, Metronome, 1948

Stan Kenton's bands have been described as "the loudest of the big bands" with "the shattering effect of the Kenton band's loud, dissonant brass" created by "screaming 'walls of brass'".

Bill Gottlieb wrote "Warm or cold, it was loud. Stan's screaming horns presaged the high decibels of the rock age, but his stalwarts did it without electronic amplification. Just old-fashioned lung power. When Stan raised his long arms to call for 'more,' the men in the brass section blew until their faces reddened, their eyes bulged, and incipient hernias popped."

=== 1968 ===
Tiny articles in early rock magazines said Blue Cheer were so loud they had to record outdoors — part of their second album, Outsideinside, was recorded on a San Francisco pier

— Neil Peart, Rolling Stone

Blue Cheer, the first American band to use Marshall amps, has been seen as a pioneer of extreme loudness, being the first band ever listed in The Guinness Book of World Records as loudest band in the world, preceding Deep Purple.

They have been described as "undoubtedly the heaviest and loudest band of the time", "Weird, obnoxious, loud as in L-O-U-D!!!" and "loud enough to get [god of music] Apollo's attention".

Billy Altman described them as the loudest band ever; "So loud, in fact, that within just a few songs, much of the crowd [at a 1968 concert] in the front orchestra section was fleeing".

Blue Cheer's 1968 debut album, Vincebus Eruptum, was widely described as the loudest record ever made at that time. Their 1986 "Best of" compilation album was titled Louder Than God.

=== 1969 ===
Daniel Kreps of Rolling Stone has maintained that "Whole Lotta Love" established Led Zeppelin's reputation as one of the loudest bands of their time.

== By decibel record ==
Decibel measurement is highly dependent on distance from the source of the sound; if this is not given, the sound level reported is of limited use. Also, sound level may be metered on several ways: average, maximum level (with the sound level meter set to Fast, Slow, Impulse, or Peak), etc. In addition, there are several decibel scales. Therefore, the decibels on the following list are not necessarily comparable to each other.

=== 1972 ===
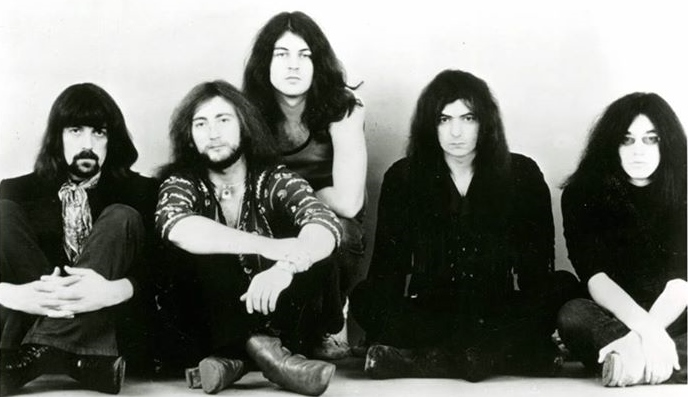
Deep Purple Mark II in 1971

Deep Purple was recognised by The Guinness Book of World Records as the "globe's loudest band" for a concert at the London Rainbow Theatre, during which the sound reached 117 dB and three members of the audience fell unconscious.

=== 1976 ===
The Who were next to be listed as the "record holder" at 126 dB, having been measured 32 metres (105 feet) from the speakers during a concert in London at The Valley on 31 May 1976.

=== 1984 and 1994 ===
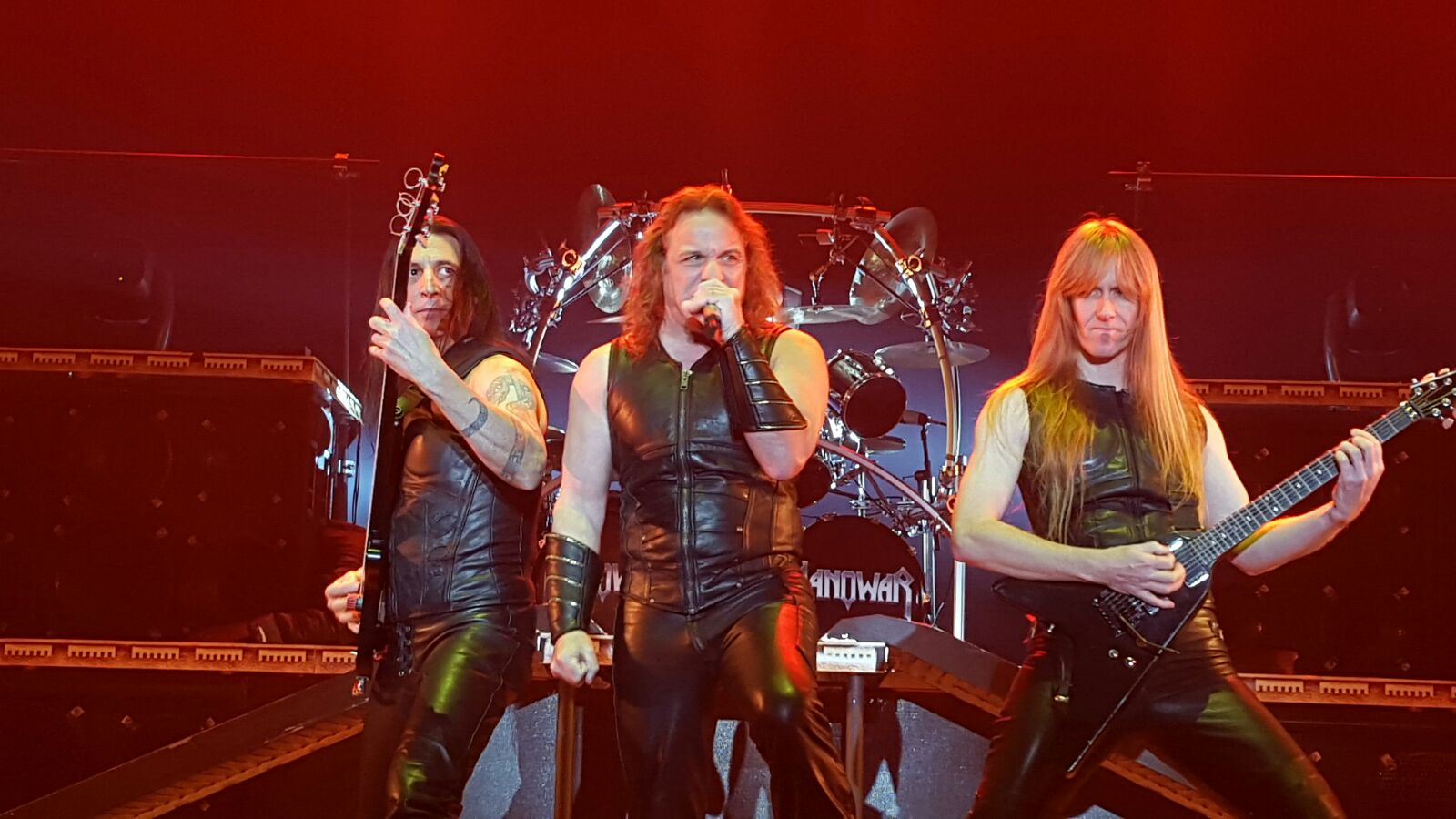
Manowar in 2016

The Guinness Book of World Records listed Manowar as the loudest band for a performance in 1984. The band claimed a louder measurement of 129.5 dB in 1994 at Hanover, but Guinness did not recognise it, having discontinued the category by that time for fear of encouraging hearing damage.

=== 1986 ===
An article by Scott Cohen appeared in February 1986 issue of Spin entitled "Motörhead is the Loudest Band on Earth". In it, Cohen alluded to an undated concert during which Cleveland's Variety Theater actually sustained damage from Motörhead reaching a decibel level of 130. This he reported was 10 decibels louder than the record set by The Who.

=== 1990 ===
The 1990 edition of the Guinness World Records contained the following entry: Largest PA system: On August 20, 1988, at the Castle Donington "Monsters of Rock" Festival a total of 360 Turbosound cabinets offering a potential 523 kW of programme power, formed the largest front-of-house PA. The average Sound Pressure Level at the mixing tower was 118 dB, peaking at a maximum of 124 dB during Iron Maiden's set. It took five days to set up the system."

=== 1996 ===
The English House/Electronica band Leftfield, while on tour to support their debut album Leftism, gained notoriety for the sheer volume of their live shows. In June 1996, while the group was playing at Brixton Academy, the sound system caused dust and plaster to fall from the roof, with the sound volume reaching 135 dB.

=== 2007 ===
British punk band Gallows allegedly broke Manowar's penultimate record, claiming to have reached 132.5 dB; however, this record claim was made in an isolated studio as opposed to a live environment.

=== 2008 ===
Manowar registered an SPL of 139 dB during the sound check (not the actual performance) at the Magic Circle Fest in 2008.

=== 2009 ===
On July 15, American band Kiss recorded an SPL of 136 dB measured during their Alive 35 World Tour concert in Ottawa, Canada. Noise complaints from residents in the area eventually forced the band to turn the volume down. (Note: 136 dB is approximately the threshold of pain, and is about as loud as either the sound made by a jet airplane taking off 100 metres (330 ft) away or by the loudest human voice shouting 1 inch (2.5 centimetres) away from the ear.)

== Deafening sound ==
Loud sounds have long been known to cause damage to ears. In Norway, this fact was proved for coppersmiths as far back as 1731. Acoustic instruments may represent a risk for hearing damage, especially with lengthy exercising in rooms with high reverberation. With powerful amplifiers and loudspeakers, the sound level and risk are increased. The volume at some concerts is above the level which may cause hearing damage without ear protection. A volume of 115 dB(A) risks permanent damage after only 30 seconds; in the UK, Norway, and possibly certain other countries, exposure to sound at that level without ear protection for more than a few minutes is strictly prohibited. The sound level claimed at some of Manowar's performances may cause ear damage almost immediately; the phrase deafening sound should be taken literally. The Control of Noise at Work Regulations 2005 introduced safety limits for daily noise exposure in the UK, an average of 92 dB(A) over 30 minutes.

Concertgoers at amplified concerts sometimes wear or improvise earplugs. Musicians and music technicians (and some concertgoers) commonly wear specialized musician's earplugs, which provide hearing protection while attenuating noise equally over all frequencies to better preserve accurate timbre perception.

== Parodies ==
The notion of "loudness equals greatness" pervades rock music to the extent that it has been satirized. In the mockumentary This Is Spinal Tap, the band is presented by the fictional filmmaker Marty di Bergi as "one of England's loudest bands". One popular joke from the film features Nigel Tufnel displaying the band's amplifiers which are calibrated up to 11, instead of up to 10, allowing them to go "one louder". As a consequence of this, manufacturers began making amplifiers with knobs that went up to 11, or even higher, with Eddie Van Halen reputedly being the first to purchase one. Marshall, the company that provided amplifiers for the film that the custom marked knobs were applied to, now sells amplifiers such as its JCM900 (first sold in 1990) whose knobs are marked from 0 to 20.

The fictional band Disaster Area (appearing in Douglas Adams's The Restaurant at the End of the Universe) plays concerts which can literally devastate entire planets. The audience listens from a specially-constructed concrete bunker some thirty miles from the stage, and the band plays its instruments by remote control from a spacecraft in orbit around the planet (or around a different planet).

== See also ==
- Examples of sound pressure
- Loudness war
