= Chesapeake and Ohio class M-1 =

American steam turbine locomotives (1947–1949)

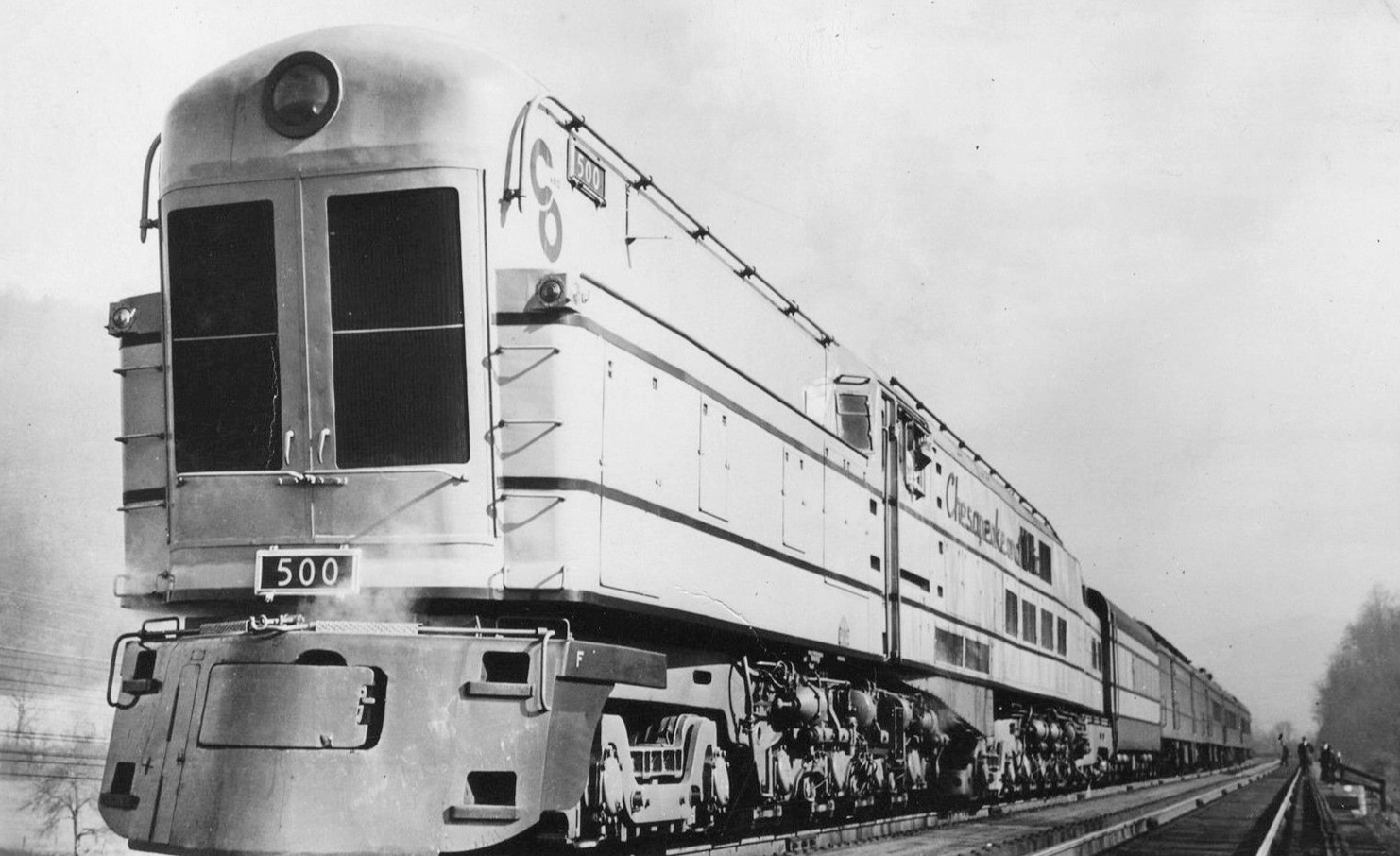
Type and origin
- Power type: Steam turbine electric
- Builder: Baldwin Locomotive Works
- Serial number: 73079–73081
- Model: M-1
- Build date: 1947–1948
- Total produced: 3
Specifications
- Configuration
  - Whyte: 4-8-0+4-8-4 (4 nopwr leading, 6 drive 2 nopwr trailing / 4 nopwer leading, 6 powered 2 nopwr trailing, 4 powered)
  - AAR: 2-C1+2-C1-B
  - UIC: (2′Co1)′(2′Co1Bo′)′
- Gauge: 4 ft 8 1/2 in (1,435 mm)
- Driver dia.: 40 in (1,016 mm)
- Length: 154 ft 3/4 in (46.96 m)
- Loco weight: 857,000 lb (388.7 tonnes)
- Total weight: 680.1 short tons (607.2 long tons; 617.0 tonnes)
- Fuel type: Coal
- Fuel capacity: 29.25 short tons (26.54 t)
- Water cap.: 25,000 US gal (95,000 L; 21,000 imp gal)
- Prime mover: Steam turbine
- Generator: 4× 1,240 hp (920 kW) DC generators
- Traction motors: 8 traction motors
- Boiler pressure: 310 psi (2.14 MPa)
Performance figures
- Maximum speed: 100 mph (160 km/h)
- Power output: 6,000 hp (4,470 kW) (turbine)
- Tractive effort: 98,000 lbf (436 kN)
Career
- Operators: Chesapeake and Ohio Railway
- Numbers: 500–502
- Nicknames: Sacred Cow
- First run: 1947
- Last run: 1949
- Scrapped: 1950
- Disposition: All scrapped

The Chesapeake and Ohio class M-1 was a fleet of three steam turbine locomotives built by the Baldwin Locomotive Works for the Chesapeake and Ohio Railway in 1947–1948 for service on the Chessie streamliner. As diesel locomotives became more prevalent following World War II, the C&O was one of several railroads that were reluctant to abandon coal as a fuel source, and saw coal-fueled steam turbine technology as a possible alternative to diesel. At the time of its construction, the M-1 was the longest single-unit locomotive in the world.

== Design ==
The M-1 was a collaboration between the C&O, the Baldwin Locomotive Works, and Westinghouse. The C&O possessed substantial coal-hauling revenue and was loath to abandon it as a fuel source. Further, C&O's engineering staff expressed concern that oil reserves would be exhausted within 25–30 years. The locomotive contained a Westinghouse turbine that drove four direct current (DC) generators, mounted in pairs. Each generator produced 1,000 kilowatts (1,300 hp) and collectively powered eight traction motors.

Unlike typical steam locomotives, the M-1's boiler was in the rear and its coal bunker was in the front. In addition, lacking cylinders, its turbine/generator drive system had fewer moving parts which, in theory, meant that it required far less maintenance than conventional steam locomotives; its designers predicted that it could make a round trip between Washington and Cincinnati without servicing.

The locomotive's throttle had 11 settings, ranging from 1 (idle) to 11 (full speed). During a trial run with a reporter from Popular Mechanics aboard, a C&O engineer expressed his dissatisfaction with a local speed limit of 75 miles per hour (121 km/h), noting that he would "sure like to be able to pull [the throttle from position 7] back to 11!" Not including research and development, the three locomotives cost US$1.6 million.

== Use ==
The C&O cancelled the Chessie train in 1948 before it ran in revenue service. Unable to fill the role for which they were intended, the M-1s were instead used between Clifton Forge and Charlottesville, Virginia, where they proved expensive to operate and mechanically unreliable before being scrapped in 1950.

== See also ==
- GE steam turbine locomotives
- Chesapeake and Ohio 490
