= Chessie (train) =

Proposed passenger train

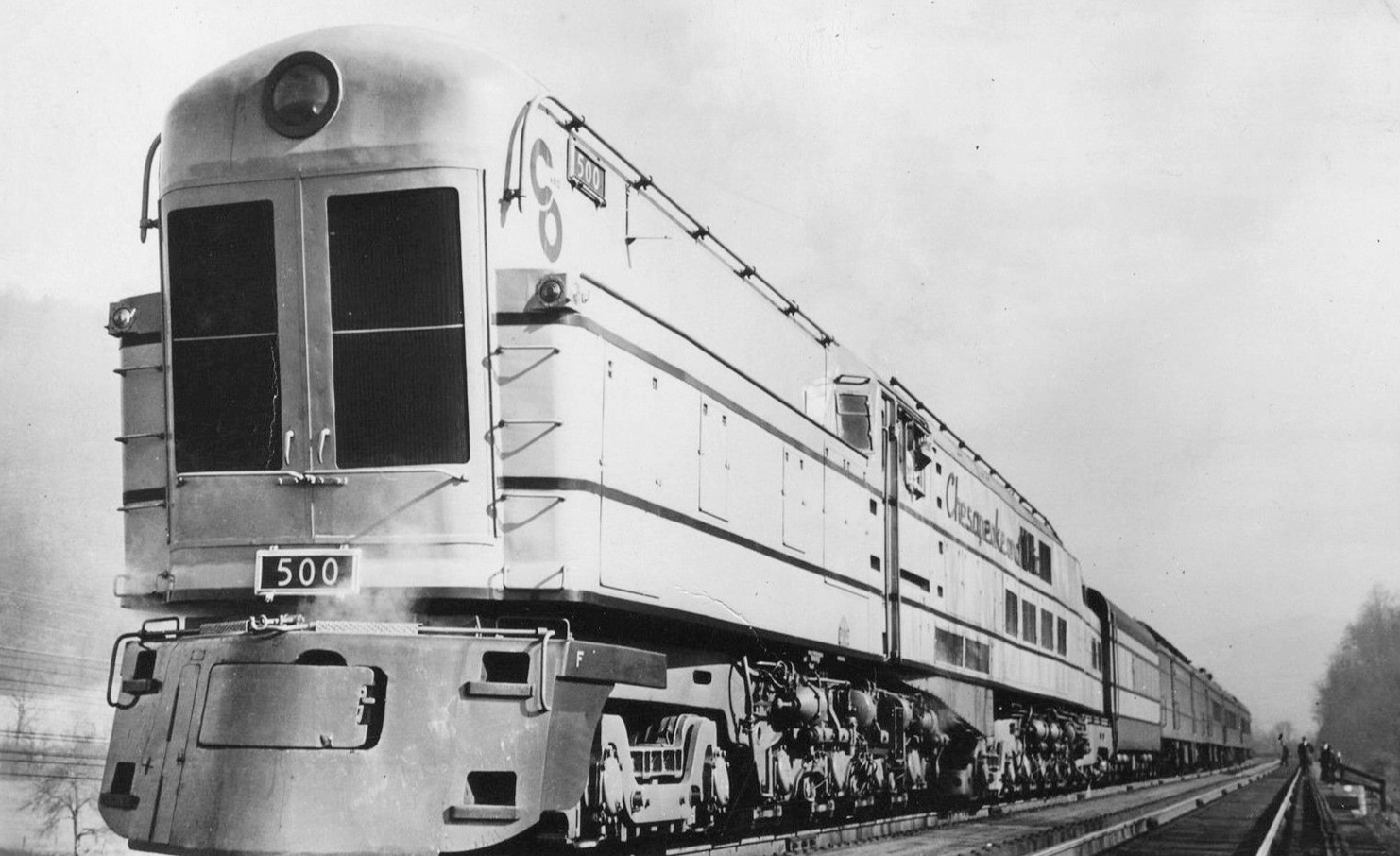
- #500, one of three Class M-1 steam turbine locomotives delivered to the C&O for the Chessie. The locomotives proved unreliable and were quickly scrapped.

Overview
- Status: Cancelled
- Locale: Eastern United States
- Former operator: Chesapeake and Ohio Railway (Not introduced)

Route
- Termini: Washington, D.C. Cincinnati, Ohio
- Average journey time: 11 hours 45 minutes

Technical
- Track gauge: 4 ft 8 1/2 in (1,435 mm) standard gauge
- Operating speed: up to 100 mph (160 km/h)

The Chessie was a proposed streamlined passenger train developed by the Chesapeake and Ohio Railway (C&O) in the late 1940s. The brainchild of C&O executive Robert R. Young, the Chessie would have operated on a daylight schedule between Washington, D.C., and Cincinnati, Ohio. The train's luxury lightweight equipment was built new by the Budd Company. A revolutionary new steam turbine locomotive would have provided power, including speeds up to 100 miles per hour (160 km/h). Although the equipment was delivered, a worsening financial outlook led to the cancellation of the train before it operated in revenue service.

== Concept ==
Robert Young became chairman of the C&O in 1942. Chairman Young proved himself an innovator and pushed for improved passenger service on the C&O. He intended the Chessie as a vehicle for his ideas, naming the train after Chessie, the small cat who served as the C&O's mascot and alter-ego. The Chessie would operate between Washington and Cincinnati in daylight, with feeder routes to Newport News, and Norfolk, Virginia, at Charlottesville, and Louisville, Kentucky, at Ashland. Passengers would travel in unprecedented comfort: coaches would contain just 36 seats, while standard configurations at the time had between 44 and 60, and the extra space would carry lounge seating. A year before the Chicago, Burlington and Quincy Railroad (CB&Q) demonstrated the "Silver Dome" dome car, Young planned to have domes on the Chessie. A section of the twin-unit dining car on the train's rear would show first-run movies. All the cars would be newly built lightweight equipment. Finally, the Chessie would be hauled by a revolutionary new steam turbine locomotive, the M1, which would enable the train to cover the 666 miles (1,072 km) between Washington and Cincinnati in 11 hours 45 minutes.

== Cancellation ==
The C&O ordered the equipment in 1944, at the height of World War II and optimism about post-war traffic prospects. By the time Budd completed the order in 1948, much had changed. Passenger traffic, which had peaked at 6.7 million in 1944, fell to 3.9 million by 1947 and 3 million in 1948. The C&O scaled back its expansion plans, canceling several outstanding equipment orders and selling off delivered cars. The Chessie was a casualty of this new outlook. In addition, the Baltimore and Ohio's competing service on the Cincinnati route, the Cincinnatian, was losing money and cost far less to operate than the upper-scale Chessie. The C&O did operate a single test train of the Chessie, but by October 1948 the C&O had broken up the consists and was reallocating the Chessie's equipment to other trains, if not selling it outright. Most of the cars went to the Pere Marquette Division to equip two new Pere Marquette streamliners between Chicago and Grand Rapids, Michigan. Almost all the equipment was sold to other railroads in 1951. Twelve coaches of the Chessie were exported to Argentina and replaced their standard-gauge bogies for a broad gauge ones for use on General Roca Railway's premium service El Marplatense that operated from Buenos Aires to Mar del Plata.

== Equipment ==
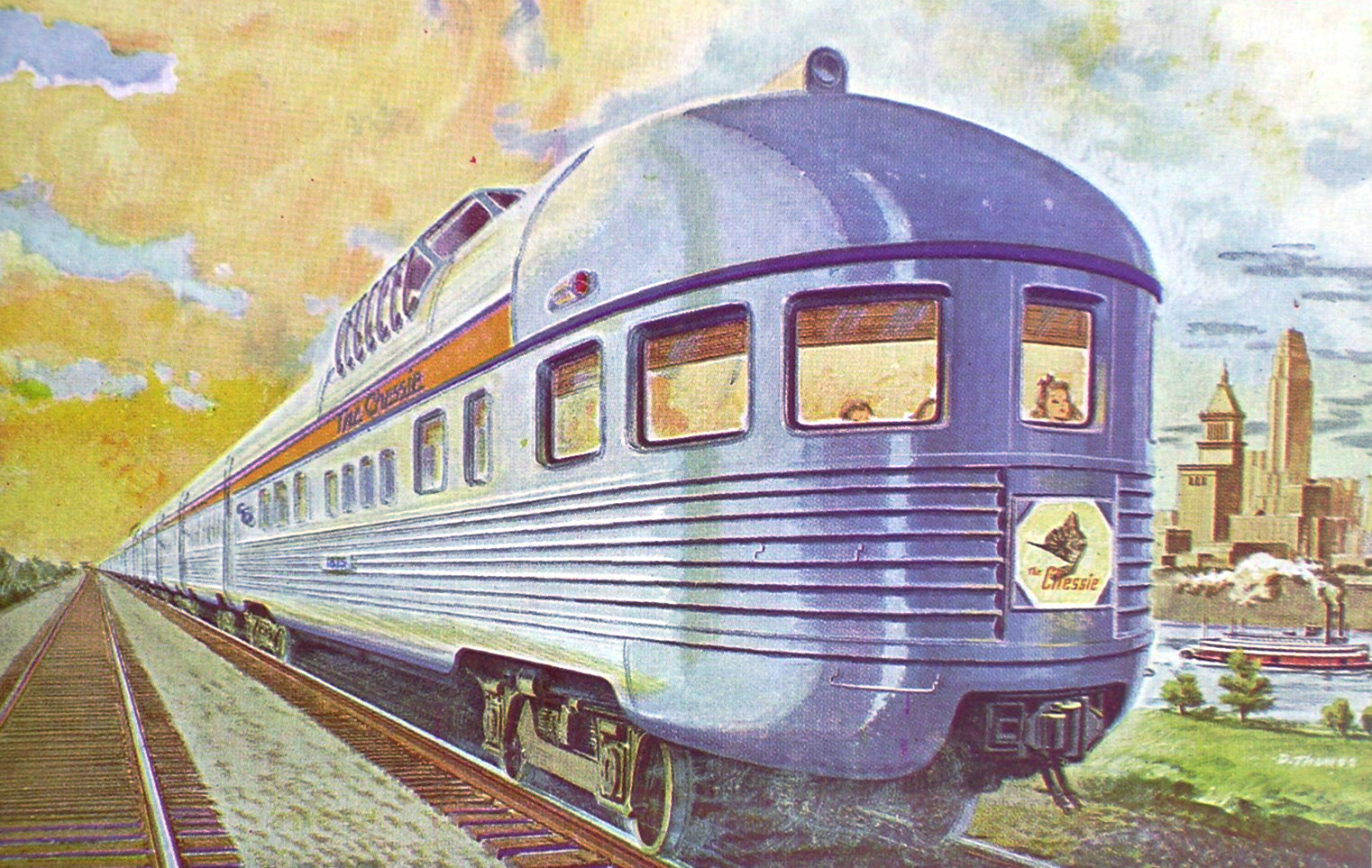
The line issued this postcard depiction of the train's observation car with dome.

The C&O ordered 46 cars from the Budd Company, including baggage cars, coaches, dome cars, tavern-lounges, dining-observation cars, and dining room-theater cars. The C&O placed its orders with Budd in 1944 and the equipment arrived in August 1948. The cars cost $6.1 million.

=== Power ===
To pull the Chessie the C&O ordered three experimental steam turbine locomotives from the Baldwin Locomotive Works. As diesel locomotives became more prevalent following World War II, the C&O was one of several railroads who were reluctant to abandon coal as a fuel source, and they believed steam turbine technology was a possible alternative to diesel. At the time of their construction, these M1 turbines were the longest single-unit locomotives in the world. Not including research and development, the three locomotives cost $1.6 million. The M1s proved a failure in operation and were scrapped in 1950. From 1946 to 1947, the C&O rebuilt their five 1926-built F-19 class 4-6-2 "Pacifics" into new streamlined L-1 class 4-6-4 "Hudson" locomotives, which were planned to be used for the Chessie feeder trains. The railway also ordered five J-3a class 4-8-4 "Greenbriers" with the same streamlining as the L-1s, but their streamlining was quickly cancelled during construction. After the Chessie's cancellation, the L-1s were assigned to other services and soon replaced by diesels. One L-1, No. 490, was spared from scrap and eventually donated to the Baltimore and Ohio Railroad Museum for static display.

=== Roster ===
Type	Capacity	Number	Road numbers	Disposition
Baggage-coach	28 seats	3	1400-1402	1402 retained by C&O, 1400-1401 sold to the General Roca Railway (Ferrocarriles Argentinos).
Coach	36 seats	12	1500-1511	1501-1502-1503-1506-1507-1508-1509-1511 sold to the General Roca Railway (Ferrocarriles Argentinos); rest sold to the Seaboard Air Line Railway and Atlantic Coast Line Railroad.
Coach	36 seats	10	1600-1609	Sold to the Seaboard Air Line Railway and Atlantic Coast Line Railroad. 1600, 1605, 1606 heavily rebuilt and currently operated by Via Rail Canada.
Family coach	32 seats	3	1700-1702	Sold to the Chicago and Eastern Illinois Railway (C&EI)
Private room/dome car	3 drawing rooms, 5 roomettes, 1 bedroom 24 seats in the dome	3	1850-1852	Sold to the Baltimore and Ohio Railroad (B&O) in 1950 and branded as "Strata-Domes".
Dome coach/observation	20 seats	3	1875-1877	Sold to the Denver and Rio Grande Western Railroad.
Lunch counter/tavern lounge		3	1900-1902	1900 retained by C&O (R. Young's private coach), 1901-1902 sold to the General Roca Railway (Ferrocarriles Argentinos).
Lunch counter/dining/observation		3	1920-1922	Retained by C&O
Dormitory/lunch counter/kitchen		3	1940-1942	Sold to the Atlantic Coast Line Railroad.
Dining room/theater		3	1970-1972	Sold to the Atlantic Coast Line Railroad.
