= SNCF 232.P.1 =

French experimental steam locomotive

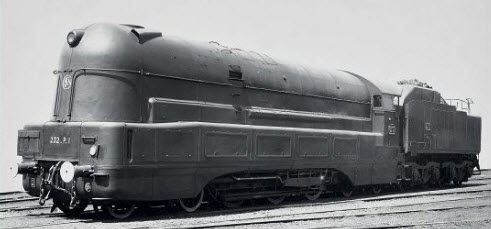
Type and origin
- Power type: Steam
- Builder: SACM
- Serial number: SACM 7759
- Build date: 1939
- Total produced: 1
Specifications
- Configuration
  - Whyte: 4-6-4
  - UIC: 2′C2′ h18
- Gauge: 1,435 mm (4 ft 8 1/2 in)
- Driver dia.: 1,550 millimetres (5 ft 1 in)
- Wheelbase
  - Leading: 2,300 millimetres (7 ft 6 1/2 in)
  - Drivers: 4,100 millimetres (13 ft 5 1/2 in)
  - Trailing: 2,300 millimetres (7 ft 6 1/2 in)
- Length: Loco: 15,070 millimetres (49 ft 5 1/4 in); Loco & tender: 25,015 millimetres (82 ft 3/4 in)
- Width: 2,930 millimetres (9 ft 7 3/8 in)
- Height: 4,250 millimetres (13 ft 11 3/8 in)
- Loco weight: 126 tonnes (124 long tons; 139 short tons)
- Tender type: SNCF 36.B
- Fuel type: Coal
- Fuel capacity: 9 tonnes (8.9 long tons; 9.9 short tons)
- Water cap.: 36,000 litres (7,900 imp gal; 9,500 US gal)
- Firebox
  - Grate area: 3.5 m^{2} (38 sq ft)
- Boiler pressure: HP: 60 kgf/cm^{2} (5.88 MPa; 853 psi); LP: 20 kgf/cm^{2} (1.96 MPa; 284 psi)
- Feedwater heater: HP: Knorr; LP: ACFI
- Heating surface
  - Firebox: 44.0 m^{2} (474 sq ft)
  - Tubes: 115.2 m^{2} (1,240 sq ft)
  - Total surface: 159.5 m^{2} (1,717 sq ft)
- Superheater
  - Heating area: 47.50 m^{2} (511.3 sq ft)
- Cylinders: 6 three-cylinder motors
- Cylinder size: 150 by 255 millimetres (5 7/8 in × 10 1/16 in)
Performance figures
- Maximum speed: 140 km/h (87 mph)
- Power output: 2,500 CV (1,840 kW; 2,470 hp)
- Tractive effort: 17,000 kgf (167 kN; 37,500 lbf)
Career
- Operators: SNCF
- Class: SNCF: 232.P
- Numbers: SNCF: 232.P.1
- Withdrawn: 1949
- Disposition: Scrapped

SNCF 232.P.1 was an experimental prototype high-pressure steam locomotive ordered by the Chemins de fer du Nord, but delivered to the SNCF after the major French railway companies merged. It was the first and only member of SNCF's first class of 4-6-4 or Baltic type of locomotives.

== Origins ==
The locomotive was ordered by on 9 March 1936 by the Chemins de fer du Nord in an attempt to improve on the power output and fuel consumption of the conventional steam locomotive.

The project involved three of the French big-four locomotive manufacturers: Société alsacienne de constructions méchaniques (SACM); Fives-Lille; and Schneider et Cie. It also received assistance from the Swiss Locomotive and Machine Works (SLM) of Winterthur, which made the design and delivered the boiler and the steam motors.

== Description ==
It was decided to fit the locomotive with a high-pressure boiler and multiple small steam motors to drive each axle

The boiler was in two parts: the main, rear part, was a water tube boiler pressed to 60 kgf/cm^{2} (5.88 MPa; 853 psi) (a conventional boiler was limited to 25 kgf/cm^{2} or 2.45 MPa or 356 psi). The forward part was a conventional fire-tube boiler pressed to 20 kgf/cm^{2} (1.96 MPa; 284 psi) and served as a feed-water heater.

There were six, three-cylinder, 500-metric-horsepower (370 kW; 490 hp) steam motors, which were attached, two per axle, to the driving axles by gearing. They had a maximum rotational speed of 1000 rpm, which would give the locomotive a theoretical maximum speed of 148 km/h (92 mph). The small motors were less bulky, had a higher power-weight ratio and were more efficient. Their use eliminated the need for a crank axle, and enable the use of small diameter driving wheels of 1,550 mm (5 ft 1 in), and shortened the length of the locomotive

The Direction du Matériel et de la Traction (service MT) (Rolling Stock and Traction Department) believed that the small motors could easily be disconnected and would not immobilise the locomotive.

Due to the absence of connecting rods, the locomotive had outside frames and an integral fairing.

== Service history ==
The locomotive left the Graffenstaden works of SACM in the early days of 1939 and testing started immediately. However, the outbreak of World War II quickly interrupted these tests; the locomotive was sent to workshops at Oullins where it went into storage. The tests resumed in 1943, and after a presentation at the Oullins Workshops in 1946 and a series of measurements taken on the Vitry-sur-Seine test plant in 1947, the locomotive went back into store. Placed awaiting authorisation for retirement in 1948, it was finally withdrawn in 1949.

== Conclusion ==
The design had to answer the desire to increase the efficiency or reduce the consumption for the same power. However, the delay caused by the World War II, the fact that the boiler was more complex, and the difficulty of maintaining the main boiler at very high pressure made the gains obtained, viz., fuel economy in the order of 30%, meant that the design had no impact on future steam locomotives.

== Tender ==
The tender which was attached to the locomotive was one of the bogie tenders of type 36.B which held 36,000 litres (7,900 imp gal; 9,500 US gal) of water and 9 tonnes (8.9 long tons; 9.9 short tons) of coal (in this case 36.B.9).
