= Steam turbine locomotive =

Locomotive using a steam turbine

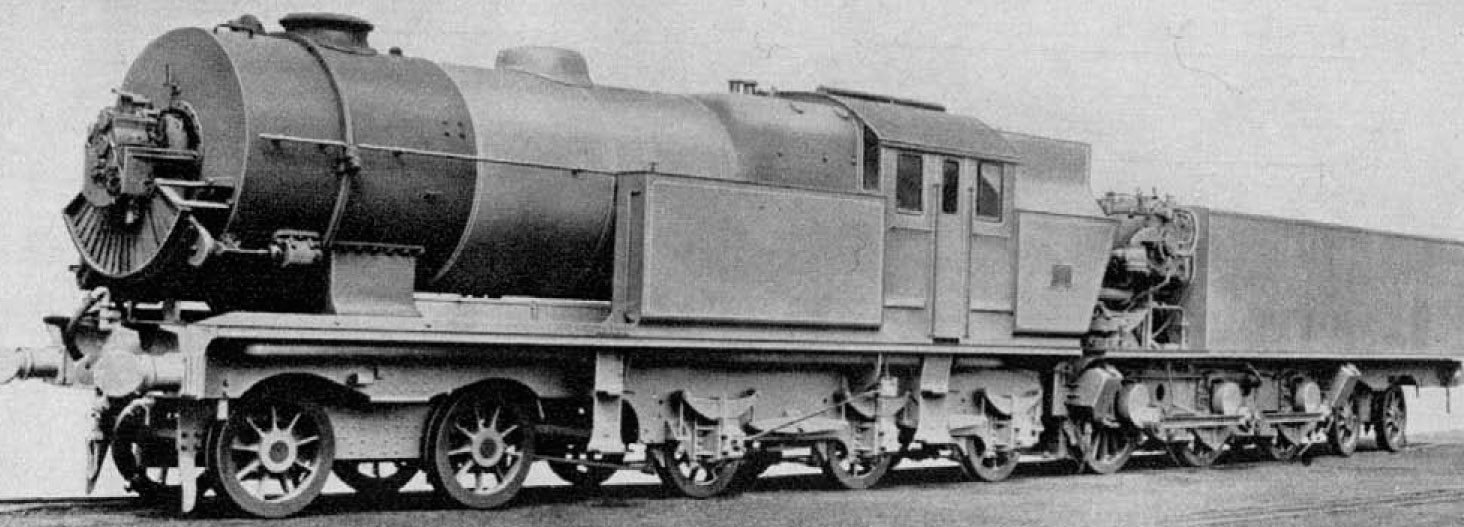
Ljungström steam turbine locomotive with preheater (circa 1925)

A steam turbine locomotive was a steam locomotive which transmitted steam power to the wheels via a steam turbine. Numerous attempts at this type of locomotive were made, mostly without success. In the 1930s this type of locomotive was seen as a way to both revitalize steam power and challenge the diesel locomotives then being introduced.

== Advantages ==
- High efficiency at high speed.
- Far fewer moving parts, hence potentially greater reliability.
- Conventional piston steam locomotives give a varying, sinusoidal torque, making wheelslip much more likely when starting.
- The side rods and valve gear of conventional steam locomotives create horizontal forces that cannot be fully balanced without substantially increasing the vertical forces on the track, known as hammer blow.

== Disadvantages ==
- High efficiency is ordinarily obtained only at high speed and high power output (though some Swedish and UK locomotives were designed and built to operate with an efficiency equal to or better than that of piston engines under customary operating conditions including part-load). Gas-turbine locomotives had similar problems, together with a range of other difficulties.
- Peak efficiency can be reached only if the turbine exhausts into a near vacuum, generated by a surface condenser. These devices are heavy and cumbersome.
- Turbines can rotate in only one direction. A reverse turbine must also be fitted for a direct-drive steam turbine locomotive to be able to move backwards.

== Drive methods ==
There were two ways to drive the wheels: either directly via gears, or using generator-driven traction motors.

=== Direct drive ===
==== Argentina ====
The route from Tucumán to Santa Fe, Argentina goes through mountainous terrain with few opportunities to take on water. In 1925 the Swedish firm NOHAB built a turbine locomotive similar to Fredrik Ljungström's first design. The condenser worked quite well - only 3 or 4% of the water was lost en route and due only to leakage from the tank. The locomotive had reliability problems and was later replaced by a condenser-equipped piston steam locomotive.

==== France ====
Two attempts were made in France. One effort, the Nord Turbine, resembled the LMS Turbomotive in both appearance and mechanical layout. The project was canceled and the locomotive was built as a compound piston steam locomotive instead. The second attempt, SNCF 232.Q.1, was built in 1940. It was unusual in that its driving wheels were not connected by side rods. Each of its three driving axles had its own turbine. It was heavily damaged by German troops in World War II and was scrapped in 1946.

==== Germany ====
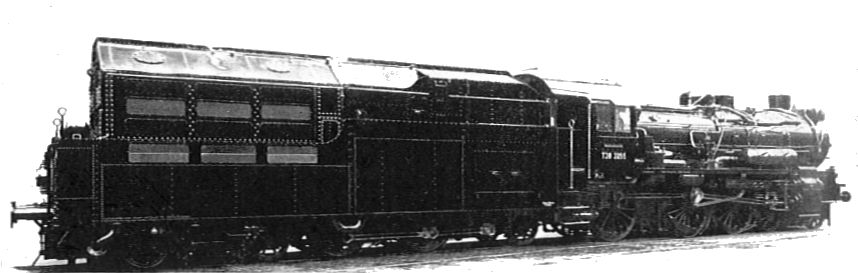
Henschel T38-2555, with the steam turbine tender

Multiple attempts at this type were made by German locomotive builders. In 1928 Krupp-Zoelly built a geared steam turbine locomotive. The exhaust of the turbine was fed to a condenser which both conserved water and increased the thermal efficiency of the turbine. Draught for the fire was provided by a steam-driven fan in the smokebox. In 1940, this locomotive was hit by a bomb. It was withdrawn from service and not repaired.

A similar machine was built by Maffei in 1929. Despite having a higher-pressure boiler, it was less efficient than the Krupp-Zoelly locomotive. It was hit by a bomb in 1943 and removed from service.

Henschel converted a normal DRG Class 38 steam locomotive to use a steam turbine in 1927. The locomotive itself was little modified, the major changes being to the tender which was fitted with coupled driving wheels in a 2-4-4 layout, driven by separate forward and reverse turbines. Both turbines were driven by intermediate-pressure exhaust steam from the original cylinders. A condenser in the tender provided a vacuum for the turbine exhaust, increasing thermal efficiency. As the final exhaust was at negligible pressure, the original smokebox blastpipe had to be replaced by an electric draught fan in the smokebox.

Performance was disappointing, and the turbine tender was removed in 1937.

==== Italy ====
Giuseppe Belluzzo of Italy designed a number of experimental turbine locomotives. None were ever tested on main lines. His first was a small locomotive with four wheels, each fitted with its own small turbine. Reverse movement was accomplished by feeding steam into the turbines via a backwards-facing inlet. Steam turbines are designed to rotate in only one direction, making this method very inefficient. No one else appears to have attempted it.

Belluzzo contributed to the design of a 2-8-2 locomotive built by Ernesto Breda in 1931. It used four turbines in a multiple expansion arrangement. Belluzzo's US patent from that period shows the turbine driving a jackshaft through a gearbox in front of the locomotive's drivers. This locomotive was never completely fitted out.

In 1933, a FS Class 685 2-6-2 locomotive was the object of a curious experiment, in which the piston engine was removed and a turbine fitted in its place, leaving the locomotive otherwise completely unchanged. Tests run were however a failure, as its performance proved to be well below that of a normal 685; the turbine soon broke up, and that signalled the end of the attempt. In 1936 the locomotive was refitted with a normal piston engine.

==== Sweden ====
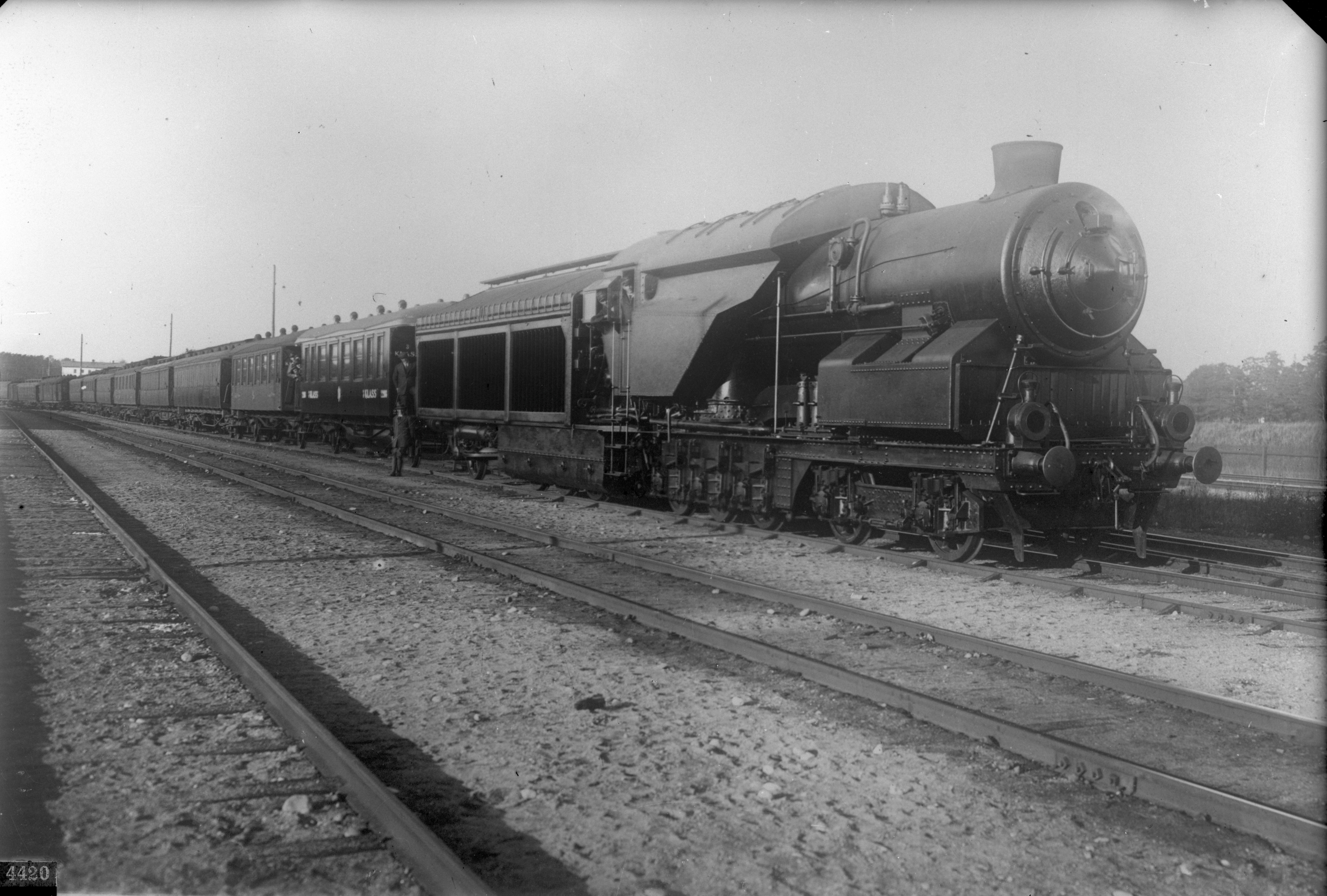
Ljungström locomotive of 1921

Swedish engineer Fredrik Ljungström designed a number of steam turbine locomotives, some of which were highly successful. His first attempt in 1921 was a rather odd-looking machine. Its three driving axles were located under the tender, and the cab and boiler sat on unpowered wheels. As a result, only a small portion of the locomotive's weight contributed to traction. In the mid-1920s, Ljungström filed a patent on a quill drive for a steam turbine locomotive.

The second design was a 2-8-0 similar to a successful freight design. Built in 1930 and 1936 by Nydqvist & Holm, these locomotives replaced conventional ones on the Grängesberg-Oxelösund Railway. No condenser was fitted, as its complexity outweighed its thermodynamic advantages. The wheels were driven by a jackshaft. These engines were not retired until the 1950s when the line was electrified. Three engines of this type were built, all three of which have been preserved. These can currently be seen in the Railway Museum of Grängesberg, two (71 and 73) being owned by the Grängesbergbanornas Järnvägsmuseum (GBBJ) and the third (72) by the Swedish Railway Museum.

==== Switzerland ====
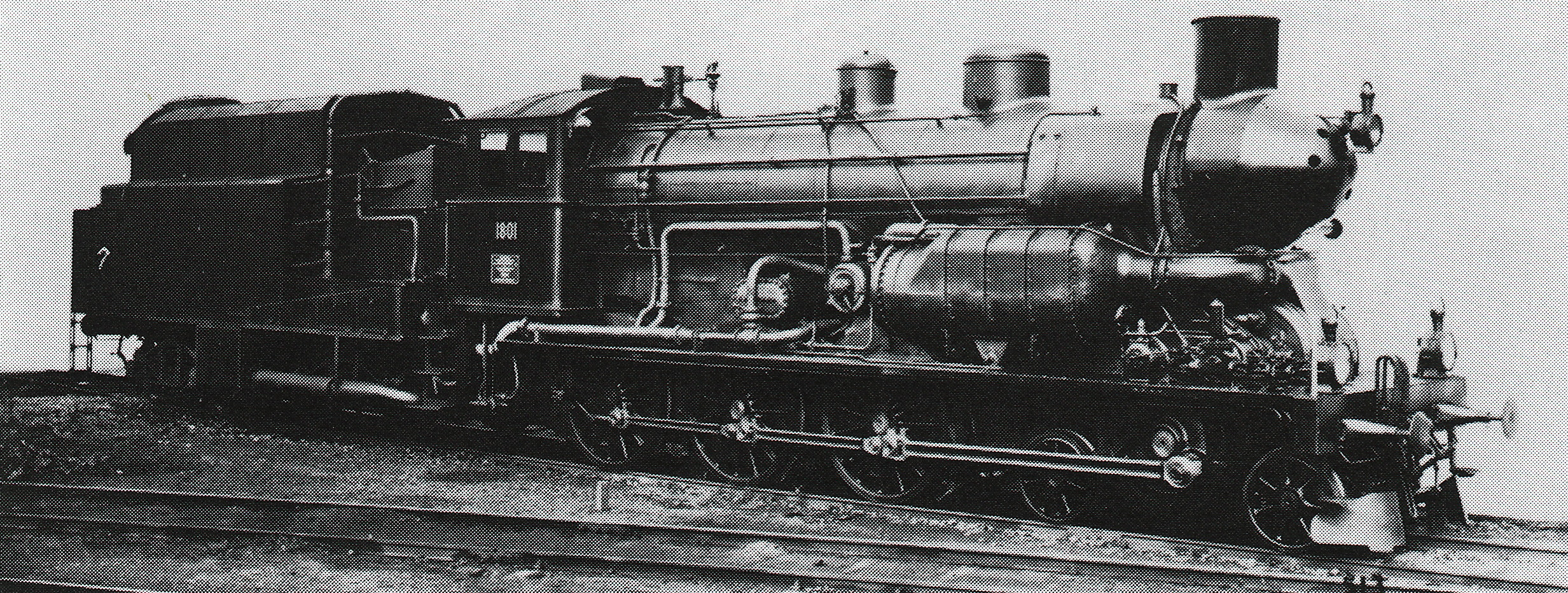
SBB Nr. 1801

The Swiss firm Zoelly built a turbine locomotive in 1919. It was a 4-6-0 locomotive fitted with a condenser. It was fitted with a cold-air blower feeding into the firebox grate rather than a suction fan in the smokebox. This avoided the complexity of building a fan that could withstand hot, corrosive gases, but introduced a new problem. The firebox was at positive pressure, and hot gases and cinders could be blown out the firebox doors if they were opened while the blower was operating. This potentially dangerous arrangement was eventually replaced with a smokebox fan.

==== United Kingdom ====
Turbomotive

One of the more successful turbines operated in the United Kingdom, the LMS Turbomotive, built in 1935, was a variation of the Princess Royal 4-6-2 large passenger express locomotive. There was no condenser. Although a disadvantage for thermal efficiency of the turbine, it allowed the turbine exhaust to still be used through a blastpipe to draw the fire, as for a conventional steam locomotive and avoiding the separate draught fans that caused so much trouble for other turbine locomotives. Despite this limitation, it had greater thermal efficiency than conventional locomotives. The high efficiency mainly resulted from the fact that there were six steam nozzles directed into the turbine which could be turned on and off individually. Each nozzle could thus be allowed to operate, or not, at full power, rather than being inefficiently throttled to a lower pressure. A certain amount of inspiration appears to have come from Fredrik Ljungström's turbines in Sweden.

The main turbine failed after eleven years in heavy service. The Turbomotive was converted to piston drive in 1952, renamed "Princess Anne" and shortly after entering service was withdrawn following the deadly Harrow and Wealdstone rail crash in 1952.

Other designs

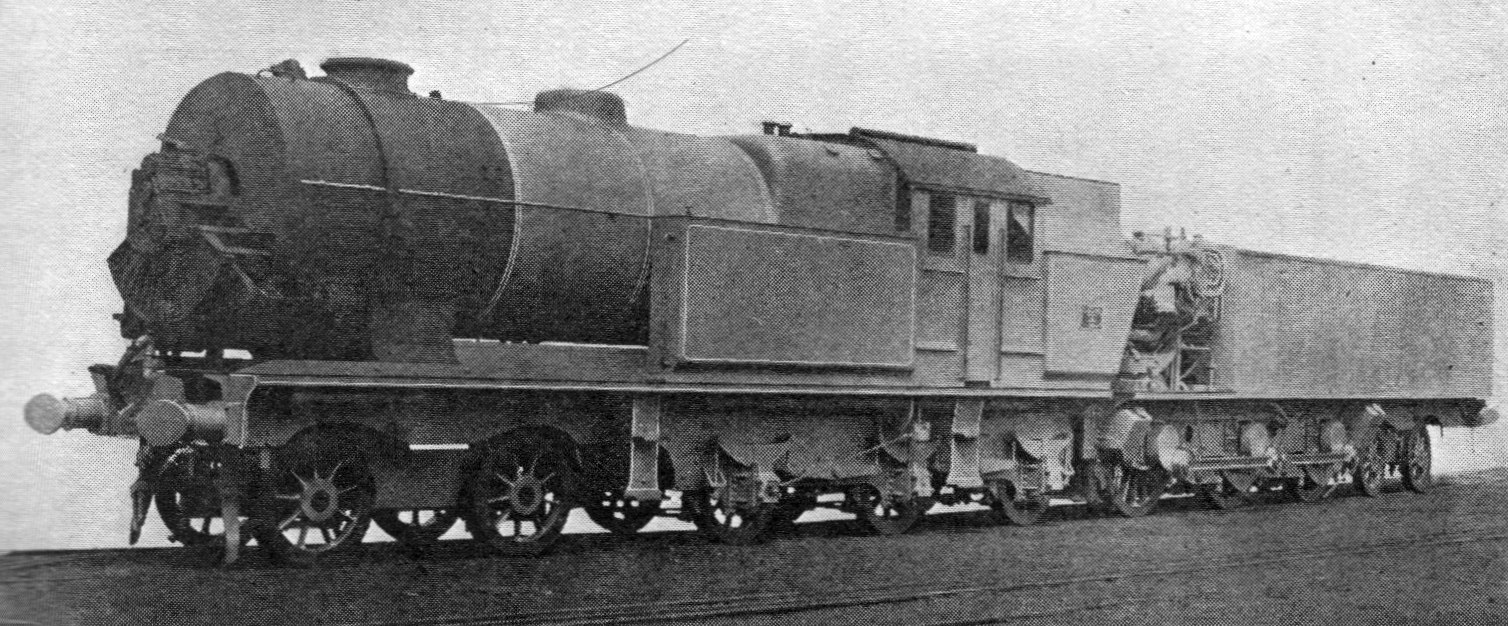
Beyer-Ljungström locomotive

Another locomotive was built by Beyer, Peacock and Company, using the Ljungström turbine by Fredrik Ljungström. Like one of Ljungström's early designs, the driving wheels were under the tender. Performance was disappointing, however, partly because of poor heating of the boiler.

The Reid-Ramsey locomotive (described below) was rebuilt by the North British Locomotive Company, replacing its electrical transmission with a direct drive from the turbine. Only a few tests were done before it was abandoned due to mechanical failures.

==== United States ====
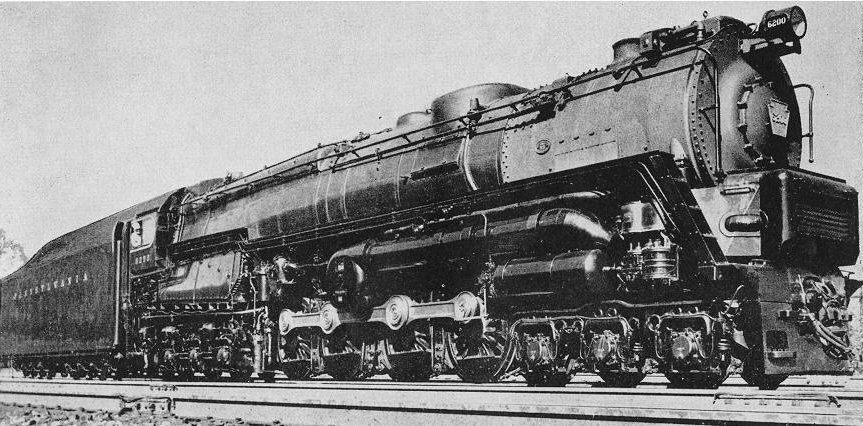
Pennsylvania Railroad class S2 6200 in a PRR promotional image

In the waning years of steam, the Baldwin Locomotive Works undertook several attempts at alternative technologies to diesel power. In 1944, Baldwin built the sole example of the S2 class for the Pennsylvania Railroad, delivering it in September 1944. It was the largest direct-drive steam turbine locomotive in the world and had a 6-8-6 wheel arrangement. It was originally designed as a 4-8-4, but due to shortages of lightweight materials during World War II, the S2 required additional leading and trailing wheels. Numbered 6200 on the PRR roster, the S2 had a maximum power output of 6,900 HP (5.1 MW) and was capable of speeds over 100 mph (160 km/h). With the tender, the unit was approximately 123 feet (37 m) long.

The steam turbine was a modified marine unit. While the gearing system was simpler than a generator, it had a fatal flaw: the turbine was inefficient at slow speeds. Below about 40 mph (64 km/h) the turbine used enormous amounts of steam and fuel. At high speeds, however, the S2 could propel heavy trains smoothly and efficiently. The smooth turbine drive put far less stress on the track than a normal piston-driven locomotive. However, poor efficiency at slow speeds doomed this turbine, and with diesel–electrics being introduced, no more S2s were built. The locomotive was retired in 1949 and scrapped in May, 1952.

=== Electric transmission ===
==== United Kingdom ====
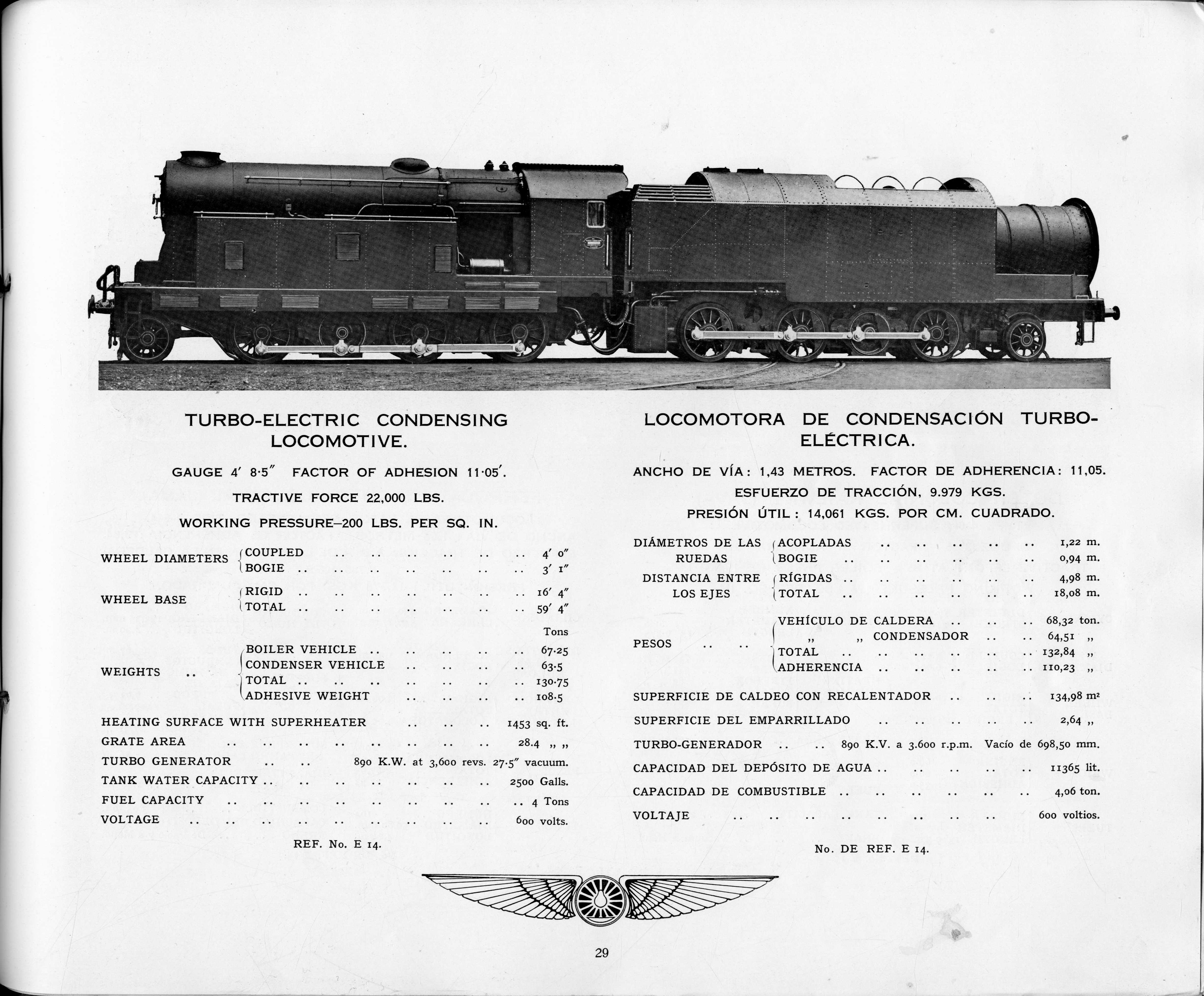
Armstrong Whitworth Turbo Electric Locomotive catalogue image

The Reid-Ramsey turbine, built by the North British Locomotive Company in 1910, had a 2-B+B-2 (4-4-0+0-4-4) wheel arrangement. Steam was generated in a standard locomotive boiler, with superheater, and passed to a turbine generator. Exhaust steam was condensed and recirculated by small auxiliary turbine pumps. The armatures of the motors were mounted directly on the four driving axles. It was later rebuilt as a direct-drive turbine locomotive as noted above.

The Armstrong Whitworth turbine, built in 1922 (image right), had a 1-C+C-1 (2-6-6-2) wheel arrangement. It was fitted with a rotary evaporative condenser, in which the steam was condensed by passing it through a rotating set of tubes. The tubes were dampened and cooled by the evaporation of water. The loss of water from evaporation was far less than what it would have been with no condenser at all. The airflow in the condenser had to take a convoluted path, reducing the condenser's efficiency. The locomotive was overweight and a poor performer. It was returned in 1923 and scrapped.

==== United States ====
General Electric

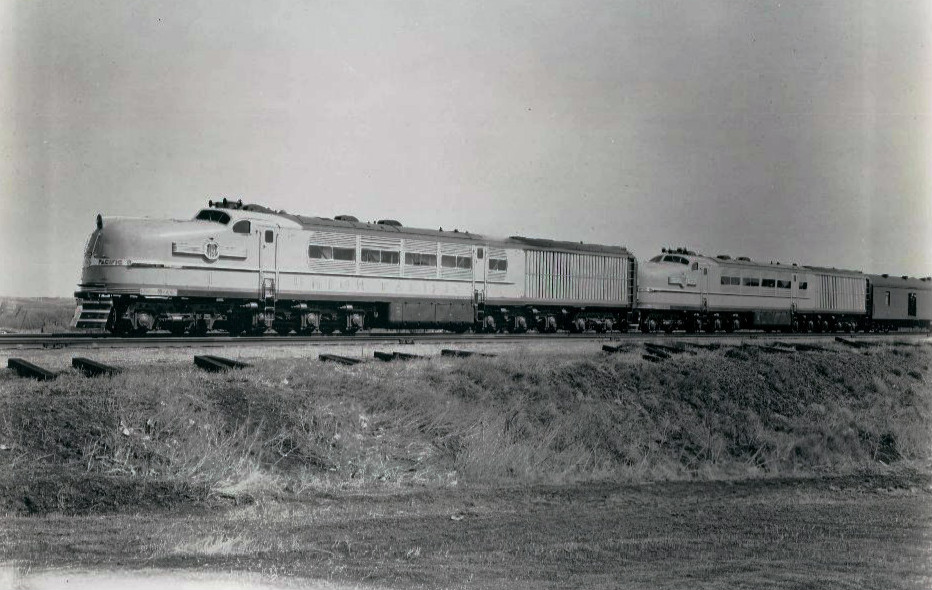
Union Pacific GE steam turbine locomotives in April 1939

General Electric built two steam turbine–electric locomotives with a 2+C-C+2 (4-6-6-4) wheel arrangement for the Union Pacific in 1938. These locomotives essentially operated as mobile steam power plants and were correspondingly complex. They were the only condensing steam locomotives ever used in the United States. A Babcock & Wilcox boiler provided steam, which drove a pair of steam turbines which powered a generator, providing power to the electric traction motors that drove the wheels, as well as providing head-end power for the rest of the train. Boiler control was largely automatic, and the two locomotives could be connected together into a multiple unit, both controlled from a single cab. The boiler was oil-fired, and the fuel was "Bunker C" heavy fuel oil, the same fuel used in large vessels, and also the fuel which was later used in Union Pacific's gas turbine–electric locomotives.

Union Pacific accepted the locomotives in 1939, but returned them later that year, citing unsatisfactory results. The GE turbines were used during a motive power shortage on the Great Northern Railway in 1943, and appear to have performed quite well. However, by the end of 1943, the wheels of both locomotives were worn to the point of needing replacement, and one of the locomotive's boilers developed a defect. The locomotives were returned to GE and dismantled.

C&O Railway

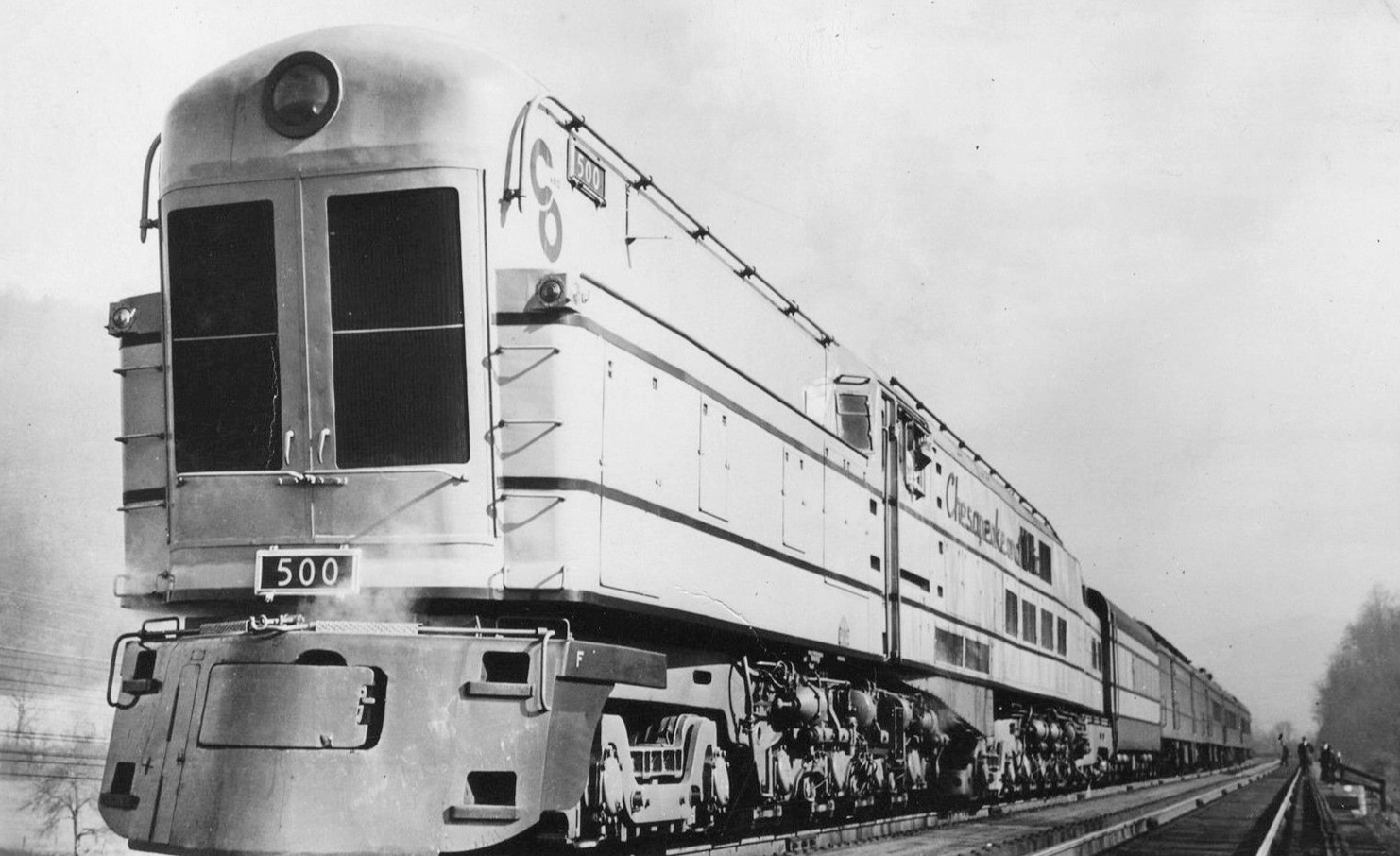
The first of the three locomotives, #500

In 1947–1948 Baldwin built three unusual coal-fired steam turbine–electric locomotives for passenger trains on the Chesapeake & Ohio Railway (C&O). Their designation was M1, but because of their expense and poor performance they acquired the nickname "Sacred Cow". The 6,000 horsepower (4,500 kW) units, which had Westinghouse electrical systems, had a 2-C1+2-C1-B wheel arrangement. They were 106 feet (32 m) long. The cab was in the center with a coal bunker ahead and a conventional boiler behind it, with the tender only carrying water. These locomotives were intended for a route from Washington, D.C. to Cincinnati, Ohio but could never travel the whole route without some sort of failure. Coal dust and water frequently got into the traction motors. While these problems could have been fixed given time, it was obvious that these locomotives would always be expensive to maintain and all three were scrapped in 1950.

Norfolk & Western Railway

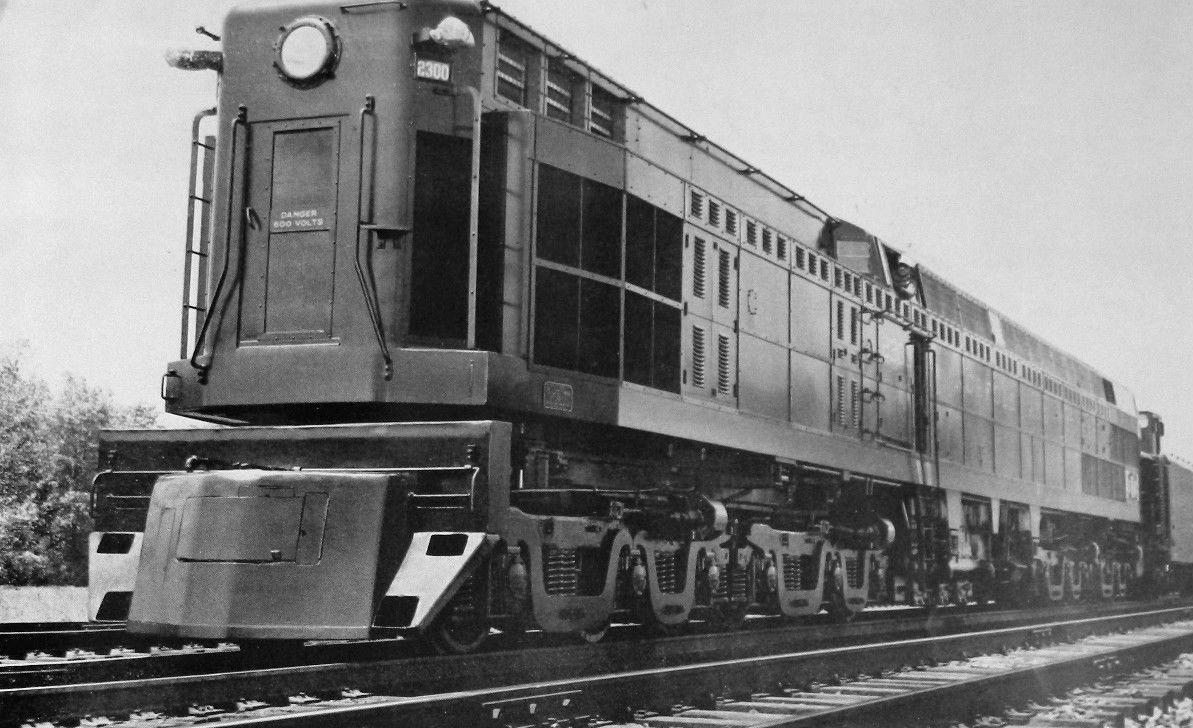
Norfolk & Western Railway locomotive 2300, "Jawn Henry"

In May 1954 Baldwin built a 4,500 horsepower (3,400 kW) steam turbine–electric locomotive for freight service on the Norfolk & Western Railway (N&W), nicknamed the Jawn Henry after the legend of John Henry, a rock driller who famously raced against a steam drill and won, only to die immediately after. Length including tenders was 161 ft 1 1/2 inches, probably the record for a steam locomotive; engine-only length was 111 ft 7 1/2 inches, perhaps the record for any single unit.

The unit looked similar to the C&O turbines but differed mechanically; it was a C+C-C+C with a Babcock & Wilcox water-tube boiler with automatic controls. The boiler controls were sometimes problematic, and (as with the C&O turbines) coal dust and water got into the motors. The Jawn Henry was retired from the N&W roster on January 4, 1958.
