= List of preserved GE 25-ton switchers =

This is a summary, listing every GE 25-ton switcher in preservation. All are listed by serial number.

== List ==
=== Canada ===
Works no.	Locomotive	Build date	Former operators	Retire date	Disposition and location	Notes	References
31575	Port Stanley Terminal Rail L1 "Stanley"	1952	Consolidated Sand and Gravel (CS&G)	-	Operational at Port Stanley Terminal Rail in Port Stanley, Ontario		

=== United States ===
Photograph	Works no.	Locomotive	Build date	Former operators	Retire date	Disposition and location	Notes	References
	15853	CTA MS-65	September 1942	Columbia Steel; Duffy and Son; Chicago Transit Authority (CTA)	2020	Operational at the Fox River Trolley Museum in South Elgin, Illinois		
	30591	Missouri-Kansas-Texas 400	May 1950	Missouri–Kansas–Texas Railroad (MKT); Alan Ritchey Inc. (ALR)	-	Under restoration at the Oklahoma Railway Museum in Oklahoma City, Oklahoma		
	30827	Ellwood National Forge 188	November 1950	Pennsylvania Power Company; Ellwood National Forge	December 2008	Operational at the Lake Shore Railway Museum in North East, Pennsylvania		
	30983	Long Island Rail Road 397	1950	National Lead Co. of New Jersey; Long Island Rail Road (LIRR)	-	Operational at the Oyster Bay Railroad Museum in Oyster Bay, New York		
	31561	Hartford Electric Light 52	April 1952	Hartford Electric Light Company (HELCo)	2005	On static display at the Railroad Museum of New England in Thomaston, Connecticut		
	31784	Central Texas Gravel 210	April 1953	Central Texas Gravel	2005	On static display at the Arkansas Railroad Museum in Pine Bluff, Arkansas	Added to the NRHP in 2007	
	33030	Long Island Rail Road 398	May 1958	Long Island Rail Road (LIRR)	-	Operational at the Oyster Bay Railroad Museum in Oyster Bay, New York		
	33375	Long Island Rail Road 399	August 1958	Long Island Rail Road (LIRR)	-	Operational at the Railroad Museum of Long Island in Riverhead, New York		
	Unknown	Jackass and Western L-2	1943	Jackass and Western	-	On static display at the Nevada State Railroad Museum Boulder City in Boulder City, Nevada		
	Unknown	Wabash Alloys Locomotive	ca. 1940	Wabash Alloys	2003	On static display at the Arkansas Railroad Museum in Pine Bluff, Arkansas	Added to the NRHP in 2007	
	Unknown	Golden Spike NHP Locomotive	-	-	-	Operational at the Golden Spike National Historical Park in Promontory, Utah	Used to move 119 and Jupiter when those aren't operating	
	Unknown	Buck Steam Station 5159	-	Buck Steam Station (BSS)	-	Operational at the North Carolina Transportation Museum in Spencer, North Carolina		

== See also ==
- List of preserved GE locomotives
- List of preserved GE 44-ton switchers
