= List of preserved GE 44-ton switchers =

This is a summary, listing every GE 44-ton switcher in preservation across the world. All are listed by serial number.

== List ==
=== Australia ===
Photograph	Works no.	Locomotive	Build date	Model	Former operators	Retire date	Disposition and location	Notes	References
	17933	ANR DE91	1943	B-B-88/88-4GE733	New South Wales Government Railways (NSWGR); Commonwealth Railways (CR)	-	Operational at the National Railway Museum in Port Adelaide		

=== Canada ===
Photograph	Works no.	Locomotive	Build date	Former operators	Retire date	Disposition and location	Notes	References
	27975	Maine Central Railroad 15	May 1945	Maine Central Railroad (MEC); Conway Scenic Railroad (CSRX)	December 1974	Operational at the Southern Prairie Railway in Ogema, SK		
	28349	Port Stanley Terminal Rail L3 Winnie	May 1947	Canadian National Railway (CN); Greater Winnipeg Water District Railway (GWWD)	1966 (CN); 1994 (GWWD)	Operational at the Port Stanley Terminal Rail in Port Stanley, Ontario		

=== United States ===
Photograph	Works no.	Locomotive	Build date	Former operators	Retire date	Disposition and location	Notes	References
	12911	Great Northern 51	August 1940	Great Northern Railway (GN); Smoky Mountain Railway (SMRR)	-	Stored at the Walkersville Southern Railroad (WSRR) at Walkersville, Maryland		
	12947	Arcade and Attica 110	June 1941	Arcade and Attica Railroad (ARA)	-	Displayed at the Arcade and Attica Railroad in Arcade, New York		
	15028	Salt Lake, Garfield and Western DS-2	December 13, 1941	Salt Lake, Garfield and Western Railway (SLGW); New York, Ontario and Western Railroad (NYOW)	-	On static display, awaiting restoration at the Western Railway Museum in Suisun City, California		
	15031	New York, Ontario & Western 104	January 1942	New York, Ontario & Western (NYOW); Hartwell Railroad (HRT)	-	Stored at the Southeastern Railway Museum in Duluth, Georgia		
	15122	Detroit and Mackinac 10	September 1942	Minneapolis and St. Louis Railway (MSTL); Detroit and Mackinac Railway (D&M)	-	Awaiting restoration at the Southern Michigan Railroad Society in Clinton, Michigan		
	15757	United States Army 7069	December 1942	United States Army (USAX); US Air Force (USAF)	-	Operational at the Georgia State Railroad Museum in Savannah, Georgia		
	17930	Western Maryland 75	July 1943	Western Maryland Railway (WM); US Plywood; Adrian and Blissfield Railroad	-	Operational at the Southern Michigan Railroad Society in Clinton, Michigan		
	18197	Arcata and Mad River 104	April 1945	New York, Ontario and Western Railroad (NYOW); Fernwood, Columbia and Gulf Railroad (FCG); Arcata and Mad River Railroad (AMR)	-	Operational at the Roots of Motive Power in Willits, California		
	27818	Visalia Electric 502	August 1945	Visalia Electric Railroad (VE)	-	Operational at the Western Railway Museum in Suisun City, California		
	27819	Quincy Railroad 3	August 1945	Quincy Railroad (QRR); Sierra Pacific Industries (SPI)	-	Stored at the Western Pacific Railroad Museum at Portola, California		
	28336	Sacramento Northern 146	November 1946	Sacramento Northern Railway (SN); Northwestern Oklahoma Railroad (NOKL)	-	Undergoing restoration at the Western Railway Museum in Suisun City, California		
	28346	Arcade and Attica 111	April 1947	Arcade and Attica Railroad (ARA)	-	Operational at the Arcade and Attica Railroad in Arcade, New York		
	29974	Claremont Concord 119	June 1948	Boston & Maine (BM); Claremont Concord (CCRR)	-	Operational at the Georgia State Railroad Museum in Savannah, Georgia		
	30253	Hartwell Railroad 2	February 1950	Hartwell Railroad (HRT)	-	Stored at the Southeastern Railway Museum in Duluth, Georgia		
	30472	Nickel Plate Road 91	September 1950	Boyne City Railroad (BCRR)	-	Operational at Indiana Transportation Museum in Noblesville, Indiana		
	30460	Nashville, Chattanooga & St. Louis 100	June 1950	Nashville, Chattanooga and St. Louis Railway (NC&StL); Louisville and Nashville (L&N); Huntsville Terminal	-	Displayed at the Cowan Railroad Museum in Cowan, Tennessee	First Transistorized remote-controlled locomotive in the U.S.	
	31870	US Air Force 1246	January 1953	United States Air Force (USAF)	-	Displayed at the Fort Smith Trolley Museum in Fort Smith, Arkansas	Added to the NRHP on September 20, 2006.	
	Unknown	New Hampshire Central 360	1942	New Hampshire Central Railroad (NHCR)	-	Displayed at the Conway Scenic Railroad in North Conway, New Hampshire		

== See also ==
- List of preserved GE locomotives
- List of preserved GE 25-ton switchers
