= London and Port Stanley Railway =

Overview
- Locale: Ontario, Canada
- Termini: London; Port Stanley

Service
- Type: interurban

History
- Commenced: 1853
- Opened: 25 September 1856

Technical
- Line length: 24 mi (39 km)
- Number of tracks: 1
- Track gauge: 1,435 mm (4 ft 8 1/2 in) standard gauge
- Old gauge: 5 ft 6 in (1,676 mm)
- Electrification: 1,500 V DC

The London and Port Stanley Railway (L&PS or L&PSR) was a Canadian railway located in southwestern Ontario. It linked the city of London with Port Stanley on the northern shore of Lake Erie, a distance of approximately 25 miles (40 km).

== History ==
The L&PS was one of the first railways to be built in Ontario, with construction starting in 1853. It provided connections between London, St. Thomas and Port Stanley. It was built primarily to facilitate trade with the United States, particularly of wood and coal. As a result of its rail connection, a substantial investment was made in the port facilities of Port Stanley, which in turn attracted American and Canadian shipping. Until 1932, coal from Conneaut, Ohio was transported via railway car ferries to Port Stanley. Railway ferries used to carry coal hopper cars from Conneaut Ohio to Port Stanley, which then proceeded to London. The railway also proved popular with local residents, particularly in the summer when many commuters utilized the system to travel to Port Stanley's beach and resort facilities. However, the railway's service was not always impeccable, as it also earned the nicknames Late & Poor Service, Lost & Presumed Sunk, and Lean, Push & Shove.

Originally, the railway operated steam locomotives, with the first passenger train arriving in 1856. In 1914 the line was leased by the City of London, which proceeded to electrify it. The City bought the line outright in 1950, 36 years into its 99-year lease. During the 1950s passenger traffic suffered from automobile competition, and passenger operations were suspended in February 1957. The Canadian National Railways purchased the line in 1965.

The London & Port Stanley Railway was inducted into the North America Railway Hall of Fame (NARHF) in 2008 in the "Local" category for "Communities, Business, Governments and Groups" for those who have made significant contributions or achievements relating to the railway industry. The L&PS made good use of the Canada Southern Railway Station in St. Thomas (home to NARHF,) helping to make it one of the busiest stations in the country in the early 20th century.

The portion of the line from London to St. Thomas is now part of the CN Talbot Subdivision, while the St. Thomas to Port Stanley portion is operated as a heritage railway by the Port Stanley Terminal Rail.

=== Rolling Stock ===
Passenger cars
Numbers	Builder	Built	Notes
Motor cars (even numbers)
2, 4	Jewett	1915	
6, 8, 10	Jewett	1915	Steel combines with modified roof similar to those used on the New York, Westchester and Boston Railway.
12, 14	Jewett	1917	
16, 18	Kuhlman	February; 1909	Built as Wisconsin Traction, Light, Heat and Power (Appleton, WI) 102 and 106. To The Milwaukee Electric Railway and Light Company. Rebuilt in 1924 as parlor cars 2 ("Menominee") and 1 ("Mendota"). Renumbered 1135 and 1136 in 1927. Sold to the L&PS in 1941. 16 returned to the Illinois Railway Museum (Union, IL) for restoration. 18 sold as a summer cottage.
Trailers (odd numbers)
1, 3, 5	Preston	1915	5 "modernized" by covering upper sash windows.
7, 9, 11	St. Louis	1908	3 of 8 cars originally ordered by the St. Louis, Monte Sano and Southern from St. Louis in 1908 before bankruptcy. Car bodies bought by the L&PS in 1916. (The other five became Washington, Baltimore and Annapolis Electric Railway numbers 88–92.)
13, 15, 17, 19			Former steam railroad coaches rebuilt to MU with the electric cars.
21	Kuhlman	February; 1909	Control trailer. Built as WTLH&P 104. To TMER&L 1129. Rebuilt as a coach in 1924. Sold to the L&PS in 1941. To IRM in 1955 and repainted as TMER&L 1129.
23	St. Louis	1907	Control trailer with extra baggage door in left side. Built as TMER&L 1110. Rebuilt in 1924 as parlor car 3 ("Waubeesee"). Renumbered 1134 in 1927. Sold to the L&PS in 1941. Sold as a summer cottage in 1955.
Freight and non-revenue equipment
B1, B2			Baggage cars (modified box cars)
E1	St. Louis	1915	Express motor
L1, L2, L3	GE	March/April/ May 1915	Boxcab locomotives. Builder's numbers 5000 thru 5002.
L4	GMDD	September; 1955	1300 hp model G12 diesel electric locomotive. Serial number A831. To CN 991 in 1966.
L5	GMDD	July 1957	G12 serial number A1384. To CN 992 in 1966.
AF1			Auxiliary flanger
SP1			Snowplow
C1			Caboose
C2			Caboose
—			Line Car (rebuilt from a caboose)
Freight cars
Numbers	Type	Introduced	Withdrawn
1-4	boxcar	7/1916	5/1920
2-5	boxcar	11/1920	7/1939
100-105	ballast	7/1924	10/1946
100-113	twin hopper	1/1956	1/1966
114-120	twin hopper	1/1959	1/1966
200-203	flatcar	7/1916	1/1949
204	flatcar	11/1930	1/1949
300-302	boxcar	10/1939	1/1949
300-303	boxcar	1/1956	1/1966

==== Preserved Rolling Stock ====
- Boxcab electric locomotive L1, electric interurban 14 and the Port Stanley incline cars are preserved at the Elgin County Railway Museum in St. Thomas.
- Trailer 3 and motor cars 4 and 8 are preserved at the Halton County Radial Railway, near Rockwood, Ontario. The latter is operational, while the former two are stored awaiting restoration.
- A boxcar from circa 1929 is preserved in Whitby, Ontario at The Station Gallery.

== Gallery ==
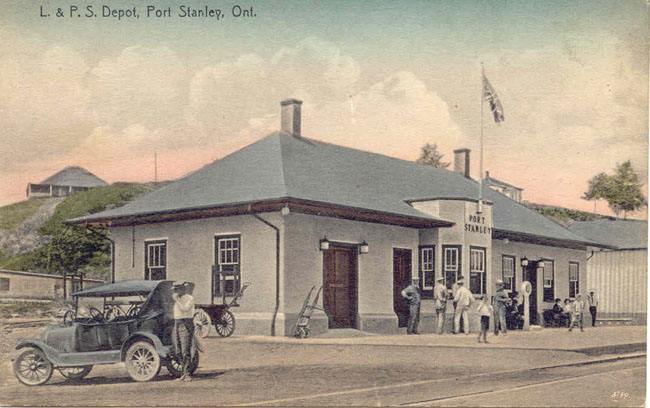
A vintage postcard view of the L&PS depôt in Port Stanley.

== See also ==
- List of Ontario railways
- London and Port Stanley Railway for MSTS Review
- London and Port Stanley Railway for MSTS Playthrough
