= H. J. McManus =

Henry Joseph McManus was born in St. Thomas, Ontario, on July 9, 1907. He moved to London, Ontario, as a young man and started several companies, including McManus Petroleums, Imperialle Fuels, Red Star Gasoline, Sterling Fuels, Arrow Petroleum, CJOE radio & McManus Motors. Over the years he also purchased several major businesses such as T. Husband Transport, Hotel London, London Arena & the Stork Club in Port Stanley, Ontario.

Hotel London was built in 1927 and Joe purchased it in 1962. It was sold in 1972 and was torn down to make way for the City Centre Tower that now stands at the corner of Dundas and Wellington.

Joe McManus was one of the most prominent Catholic laymen in the London diocese and for his work and contributions on behalf of the church, he was invested as a Knight of the Magistral Cross of the Sovereign Order of Malta in 1958. He was recognized by his inclusion in the London Business Hall of Fame and a monument erected to honour London's 51 most prominent people. The Grand Theater's McManus theater and Joe McManus Canoeing & Rowing facility both carry his name. McManus died on January 7, 1976, as the result of an automobile accident that occurred on December 12, 1975, which also claimed the life of his wife, Bessie.
