= Ken Summers =

Ken or Kenneth Summers may refer to:

- Ken Summers (politician) (born 1953), Colorado legislator
- Kenneth J. Summers (born 1944), Canadian naval officer
