= St. Thomas City Council =

Governing body of St. Thomas, Ontario

St. Thomas City Council is the governing body of the city of St. Thomas, Ontario, Canada. It is made up of a mayor and seven aldermen who are elected on an "at-large" basis. Elections for the city council are held every four years.

== 2006-2010 City Council ==
Elected in the municipal elections of 2006 for St. Thomas, Ontario, Canada. It served the city from December 1, 2006 – November 30, 2010.

- Mayor Cliff Barwick
- Heather Jackson-Chapman
- Bill Aarts
- Gord Campbell
- Tom Johnston
- Terry Shackelton
- Lori Baldwin-Sands
- David Warden

== 2010-2014 City Council ==
Elected in the municipal elections of 2010 for St. Thomas, Ontario, Canada.

- Mayor Heather Jackson
- Lori Baldwin-Sands
- Gord Campbell
- Mark Cosens
- Tom Johnston
- Jeff Kohler
- David Warden
- Sam Yusuf

Alderman Sam Yusuf stepped down from council April 24, 2013. On May 6, 2013, council appointed Cliff Barwick to council to fill the vacancy.
