= Whitby Junction station =

Historic railway station in Ontario

Whitby Junction
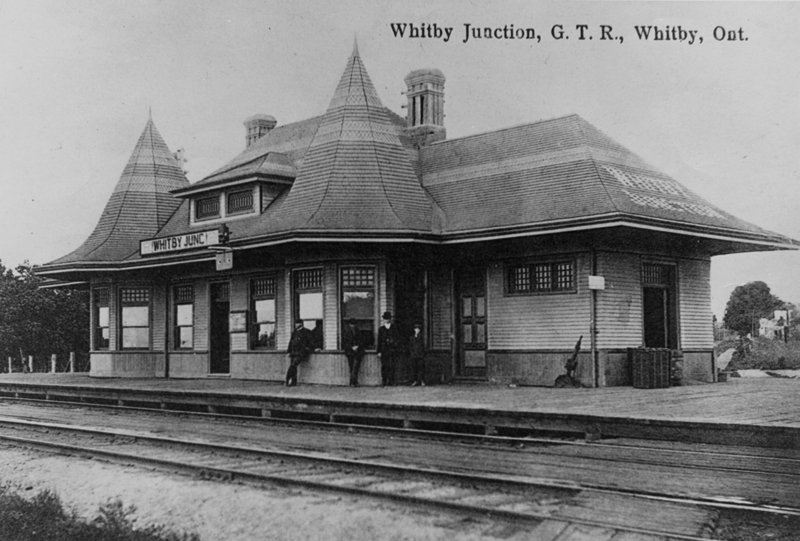
- The station, circa 1906

General information
- Location: 1450 Henry St, Whitby, ON; Canada
- Coordinates: 43°51′41″N 78°56′24″W

Other information
- Status: preserved, public art gallery

History
- Opened: 1903
- Closed: 1969

Former services
Preceding station	Canadian National Railway	Following station
Pickering toward Sarnia	Grand Trunk Railway; Main Line	Oshawa toward Montreal
Terminus	Whitby – Lindsay	Whitby toward Lindsay

Ontario Heritage Act
- Official name: The Station Gallery
- Designated: 2006
Location

Whitby Junction is a historic railroad station, originally built at the foot of Byron Street in Whitby, Ontario. Under Canadian National the station was later known as Whitby, due to the closure of the central Whitby station between this station and Manilla Junction. The former Grand Trunk Railway station closed in 1969 and the building was first moved to the north-east corner of Victoria and Henry Streets for use as an art gallery and in 2004 moved across the road to its current location in Whitby Iroquois Park.

== History ==
The station served as a junction with the Port Whitby & Port Perry Railway just a short distance to the east. (The Port Whitby & Port Perry became part of the Midland Railway of Canada on March 10, 1882, itself becoming part of the Grand Trunk in 1884, though the amalgamation wasn't authorized until 1893.) An additional track was added by the Grand Trunk running from the station to the location of the junction to allow trains to travel to and from Whitby Junction to Lindsay and points beyond.

The station originally had its name spelled out in paint on the sides of the roof along the tracks, with an additional hanging sign mounted on the eaves under the roof (added sometime before 1920). The painted name on the roof would be gone by the 1950s.

The station was closed and slated for demolition in the 1960s. A group of local arts enthusiasts had founded a community art gallery in 1967; this group purchased the former railway station in 1969 and it was moved to Henry and Victoria Streets in 1970. The building became The Station Gallery and has served as a community art gallery since then. The building was moved to Henry Street in 2005 with expansion designed by Phil Goldsmith of Goldsmith, Borgal and Company. It re-opened in 2006.

The building has been protected under Part IV of the Ontario Heritage Act since 2006. The designation by-law applies to the exterior of the station as built in 1903 and also to the boxcar (c. 1929, originally from the London and Port Stanley Railway) located outside the building. The station was a product of the Grand Trunk's Building Department, designed in "'Railway Style,' a style whose hallmark was a copious overhanging roof which usually skirted the entire building to give protection for passengers on the platforms and entranceways. Reflecting also an acceptance of the rational and picturesque system of High Victorian design, the internal functions of this low, turreted structure are readily identifiable from the exterior." This station building replaced another (now demolished) structure located on the north side of the tracks, along the Grand Trunk's line between Toronto and Montreal. It was finally closed in 1969. "By this time, abundant supplies of cheap gas, a vastly improved network of highways coupled with the greater flexibility of road transport, consumer preference for the automobile had rendered the station redundant."

=== Murder at the station ===
Billy Stone, a 21-year-old telegraph operator, was shot and killed at the Station on December 11, 1914. Over one hundred years later, his murder remains unsolved. Stone was working the night shift on December 11, when a single shot rang out in the station at 12:37 am. Stone was able to call the local Bell Telephone switchboard, saying he had been shot. He was unable to identify the shooter; when help arrived, he had succumbed to the gun shot, which managed to penetrate his heart. Nothing was missing at the crime scene and no cash was taken. A bloody handprint was found at the scene; it was noted that Stone's hands were clean. An inquest was called in January 1915, but all leads turned out to be dead ends. Billy's father William Stone Sr. was examined by the inquest; feeling that he had become the prime suspect, Stone Sr. ended his life by lying down on the tracks and was run over by a passing train. The ghost of the dead telegraph operator is said to haunt the old station and has been seen by some passing through walls in the building.

Police gathering evidence at the scene explained that there was no powder on the victim's clothes, indicating he had been shot from a distance, likely from the station waiting room. Stone usually extinguished the lights in the station at midnight; the only light in the station was a small lamp over the operator's desk at the time. The last person to see him alive was an accountant from the local asylum that walked past the dispatcher's office at 12:05.

The three most-discussed reasons for Stone Jr.'s murder are that his father killed him for money, that he was killed over an alleged affair or that he was killed over a potential gambling debt.

== See also ==
- List of unsolved murders (1900–1979)
