= Elgin County Railway Museum =

Coordinates: 42.7768°N 81.1827°W

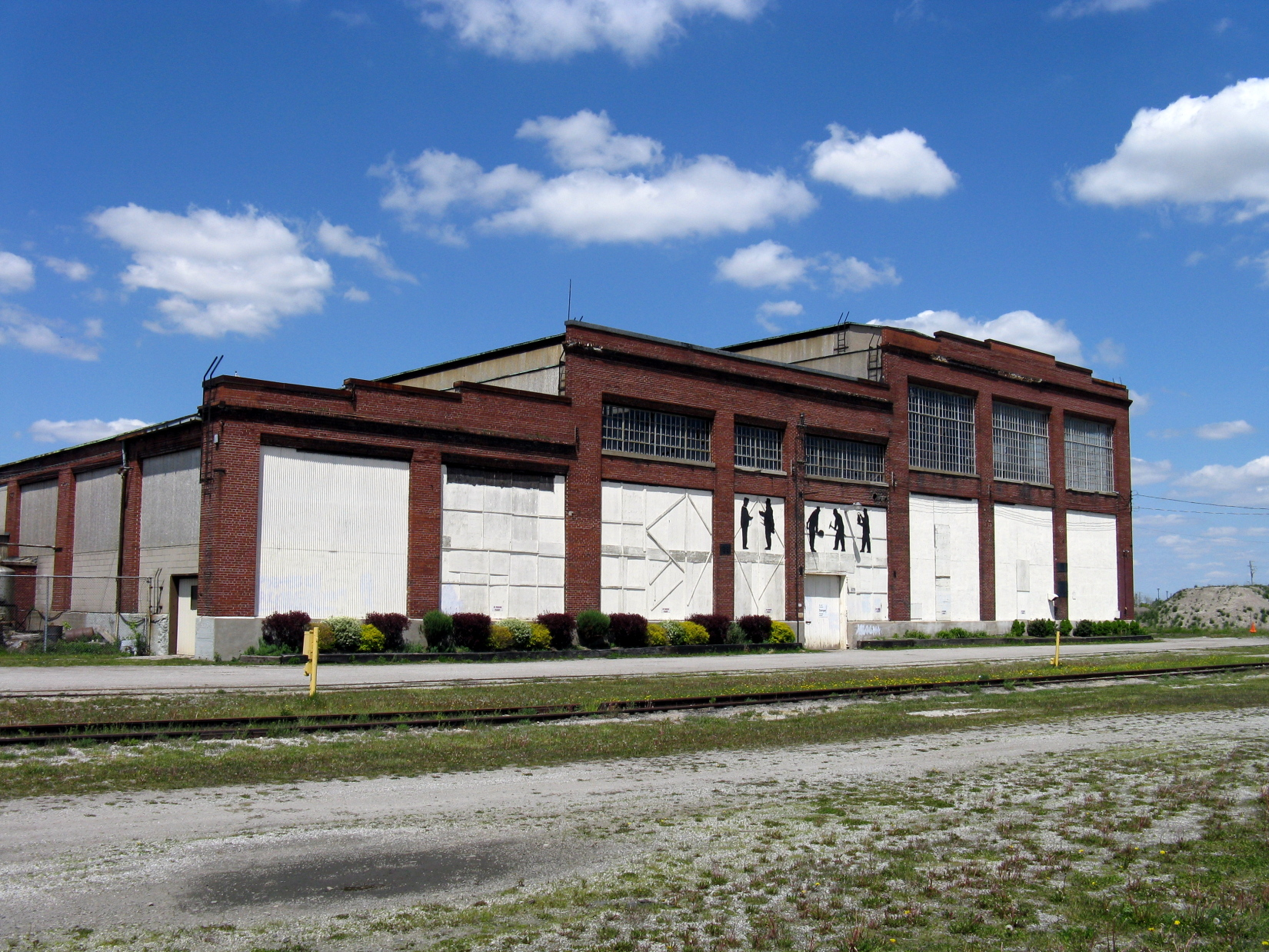
- Established: 1988
- Location: St. Thomas, Ontario
- Type: Railway museum
- Website: ecrm.ca

The Elgin County Railway Museum is a rail transport museum in St. Thomas, Ontario.

The museum and most of the collections are housed in the former Michigan Central Railroad locomotive shops. Built in 1913, the shops were part of more extensive servicing facilities on the Canada Southern Railway. The museum acquired the facility in 1988 when the last owners, Canadian National Railway and Canadian Pacific Railway, left the area. The museum finally occupied the building in 1988. In 2009 15 acres of railway lands were acquired.

The museum uses trackage from the museum that runs west and then south of the Museum. The line is used for the annual Day Out with Thomas ride.

The nearby BX Tower was preserved and occupied by the museum but owned by the City of St. Thomas.

== Collection ==
The museum collection includes five locomotives:

1. Canadian National Railway #5700 "Hudson" - Montreal Locomotive Works K-5-a steam 4-6-4 locomotive
2. Wabash #51 - GE 43-ton switcher
3. Canadian Pacific Railway #8921 - Montreal Locomotive Works RSD-17 (the only one ever made)
4. London and Port Stanley Railway #L1 - GE boxcab electric freight locomotive c.1915
5. Canadian National Railway #9171 - EMD F7Au (built as EMD F3 as GTW #9013, converted 1973, retired 1989)

Several passenger and freight cars are also preserved, either inside the building or outside:

- Canadian National Railway Jordan Spreader #51041 - Built by St. Thomas Canada Southern shops
- London and Port Stanley Railway Port Stanley Incline Cars
- Norfolk & Western Railroad Caboose #555020 - built by International Car Company of Kenton, Ohio c.1976
- Grand Trunk Western Railroad Caboose #77137 - Port Huron MI built
- Canadian National Railway Baggage Car #7074 - built by National Steel Car c.1953
- New York Central Railroad 10-5 Sleeper #10075 "Cascade Lane" - Pullman Car Company c. 1939
- London and Port Stanley Railway Electric Interurban #14 - Jewett Car Company c.1917

There is also an H0 scale model railroad that recreates scenes from the area.

== Images ==
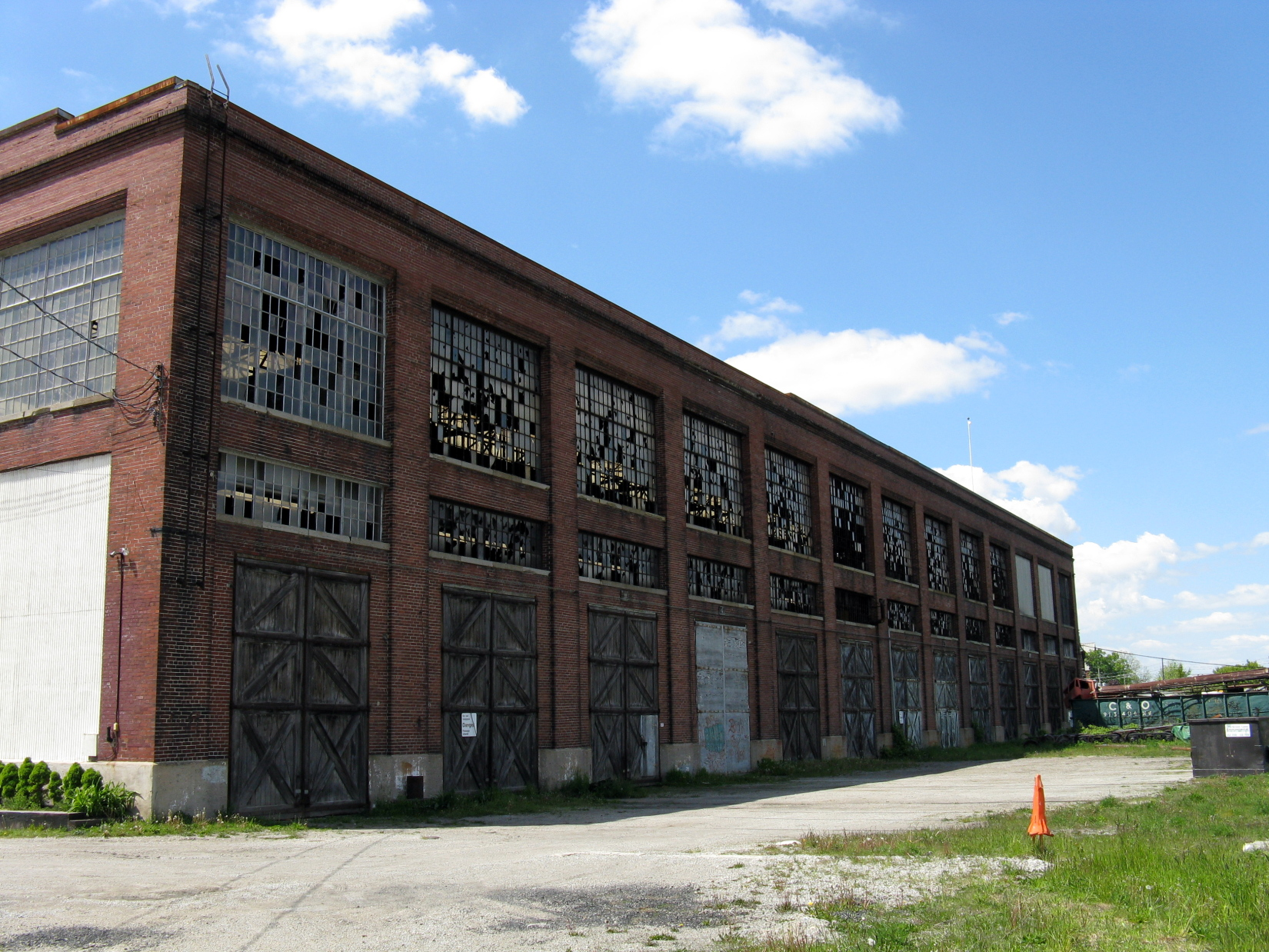
Exterior of museum on west side, showing doors leading to transfer table

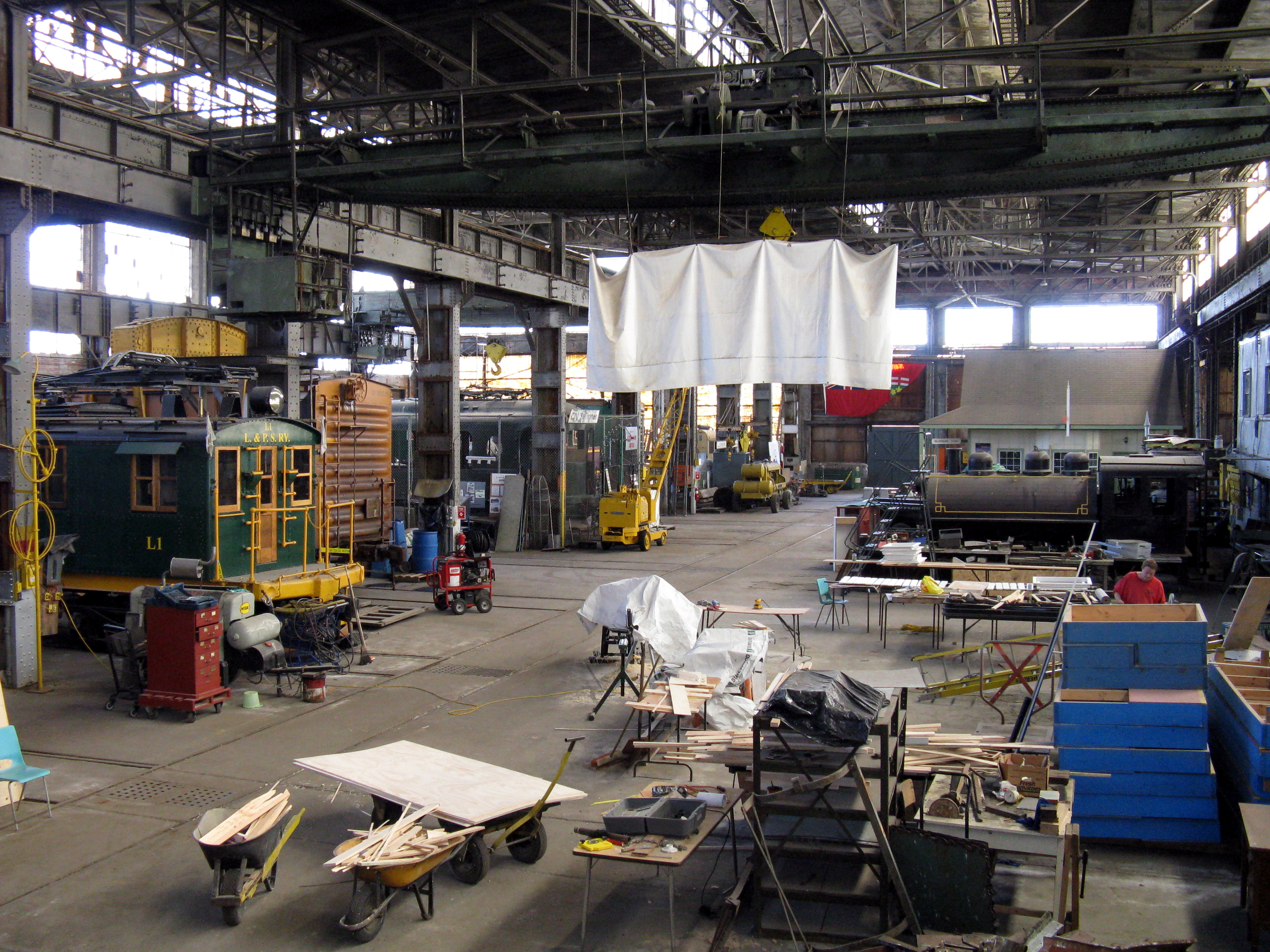
Interior of museum, facing south

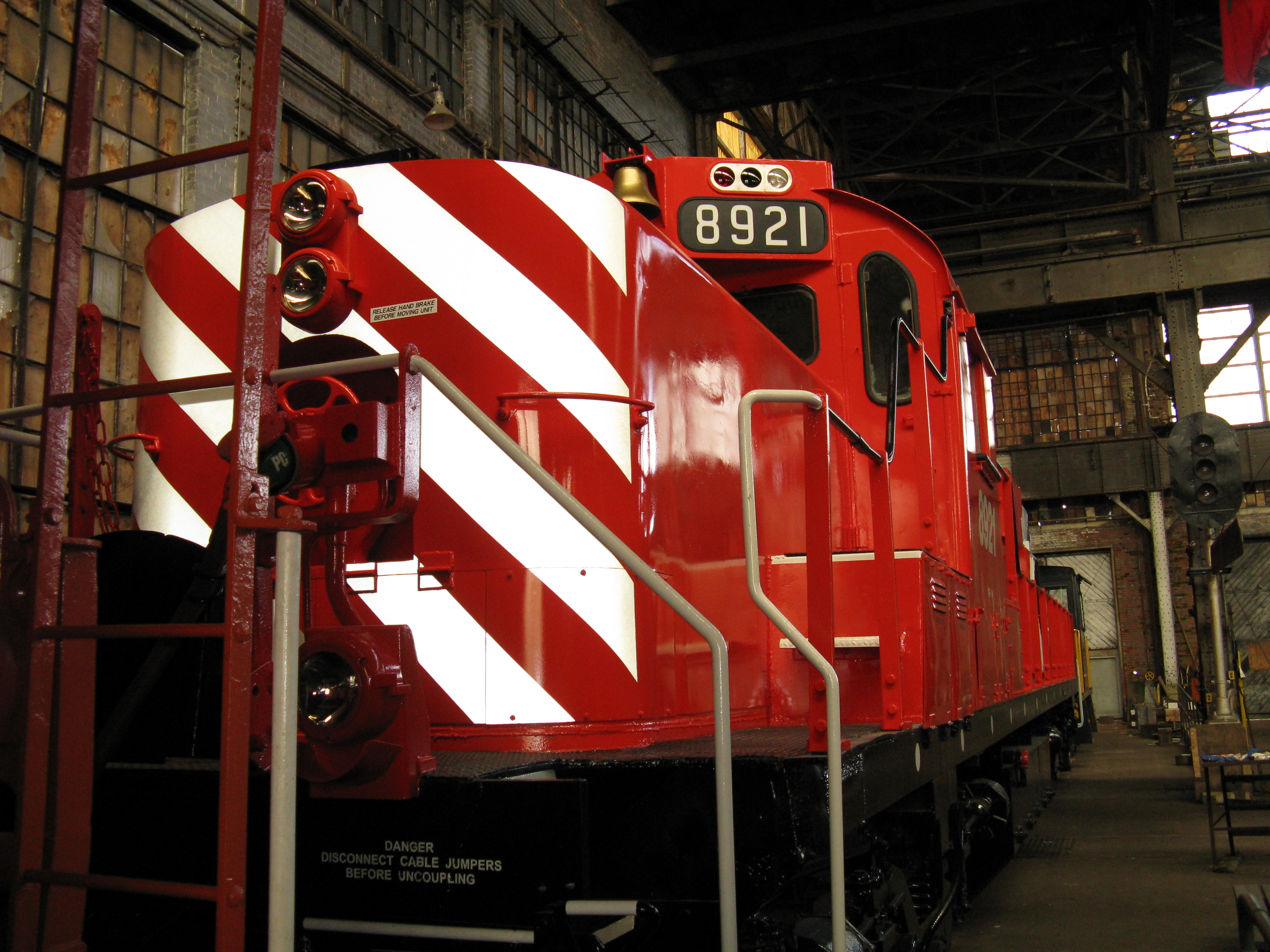
Close-up of CPR RSD-17
