= Neil R. Darrach =

Canadian architect

One of Darrach's more prominent designs. The current design of the Elgin County Courthouse is largely due to his work in the late 19th century after the building was largely destroyed by fire

Neil R. Darrach (1850–1926) was a noted Canadian architect from St. Thomas, Ontario. He was architect for over five designated heritage properties in St. Thomas, Ontario and Regina, Saskatchewan. He was primarily active in the later 19th century.

== Early life ==
Neil was born in Southwold Township, Ontario in 1850. He moved to St. Thomas as a youth and became involved in construction at the start of the railway boom in the early 1870s. Darrach received no formal training as an architect, but it was suggested he learnt the trade primarily through trade books and experience.

== St. Thomas career ==
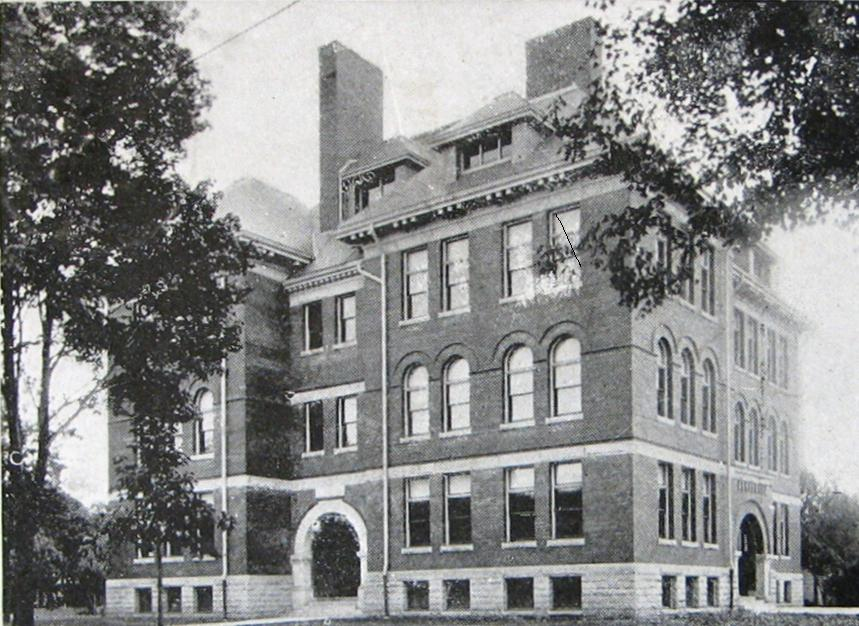
Wellington Street Public School, photographed in 1905.

Simplicity of form and emphasis on symmetry using a central hall plan characterizes most of Darrach's buildings. Darrach's first building was designed in 1879. This was the Centre Street Baptist Church in St. Thomas, one of many church designs to follow. Neil would also work on the First United Church, the Grand Central Hotel (subsequently destroyed in the later 20th century), St. Thomas Masonic Hall, Myrtle and Balaclava Street Schools; and several prominent homes in the community in addition to the heritage buildings described below. In 1898 disaster struck the Elgin County Courthouse (which was originally designed in 1854 by John Turner) where a significant portion of the building was destroyed by fire. Darrach was retained to re-design the building and did so under the present Palladian style. The building is still in use today and recently received a government grant of over 100 million dollars for renovations. Perhaps one of Neil's more prominent constructions was the design of the St. Thomas City hall in 1898–99. Darrach's design was chosen out of 10 applications submitted. The building was designed in the late Richardsonian Romanesque style. Subsequently in 1903, Neil was retained to design the City Public Library. This was achieved through Neoclassical Revival style (which now serves as a municipal building extension)adjacent to the city hall. the building was largely paid for by a Carnegie Foundation grant. Other designated heritage properties designed by Darrach include; the late Victorian building the Southern Loan Building which still has 16 functioning vaults, The Princess Avenue Play House (once a church, now a theatre) built in 1907. Despite the catalogue of buildings that are known to be built by Darrach, there is often controversy surrounding the history of some other buildings of historical value in the city which are sometimes argued to be designed by Neil. Over 24 buildings in St. Thomas are known to be designed by Neil.

== Regina career ==
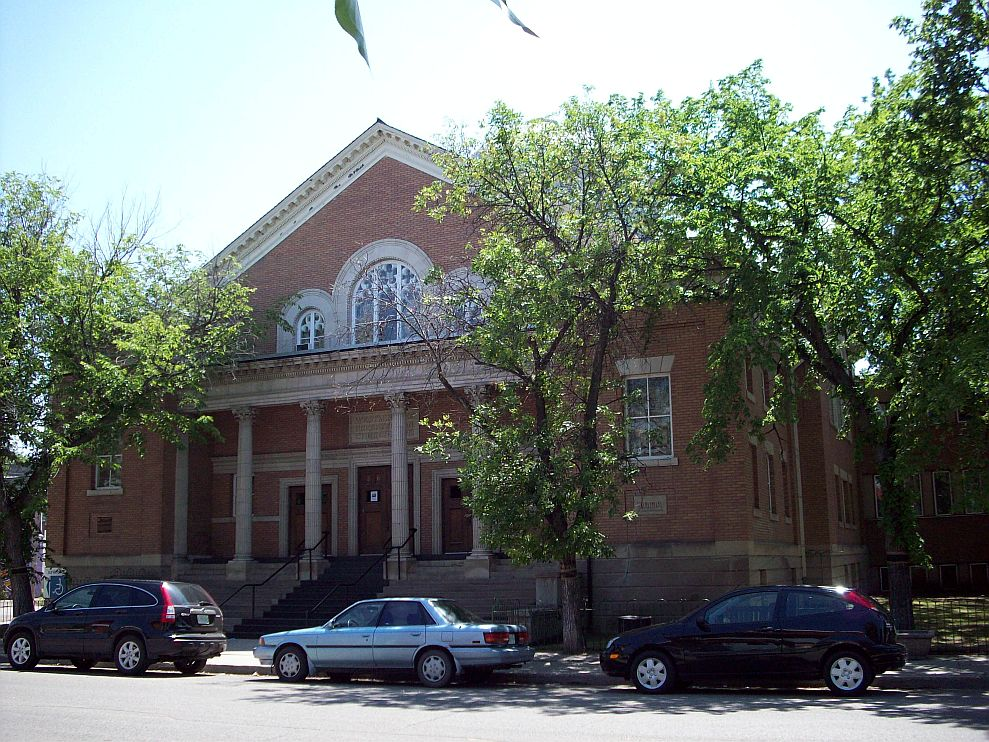
Built in 1913, the Westminster Presbyterian, later United, Church in Regina.

In the late 19th century in Canada architecture was a trade. Where more experienced architects would train younger architects and so on. Neil Darrach would be Maurice Sharon's mentor, who would later become Saskatchewan’s first provincial architect. Later, as more colleges and universities instituted architectural programs, architects could obtain more formal training. In 1911 Neil came to Regina, Saskatchewan to work in partnership with Maurice W. Sharon, who later served as Chief Provincial Architect, Saskatchewan, 1917-1930.

Together they designed the Western Trust Company building, now a heritage building. In a brief career that lasted until 1917 (when he returned to Ontario), Darrach's designs also included the Leader Building, Westminster Presbyterian Church (later United(Pictured)) and the Donahue Block.

== Legacy ==
After returning from Saskatchewan, Neil worked in St. Thomas again. The last piece of work prior to his death in 1926 was the Memorial Hospital, which was completed in 1923. The building no longer remains today. In summary; Wellington Street Public school, St. Thomas City hall, Old St. Thomas Public Library, Princess Avenue play house (originally a church), The former Southern Loan building are all designated heritage properties in St. Thomas while the Western Trust Company Building in Regina is also designated in Saskatchewan. Neil Darrach was referred to being a master of his art, dedicated and a prolific architect.
