= Kettle Creek (Ontario) =

Coordinates: 42.701834°N 81.217978°W

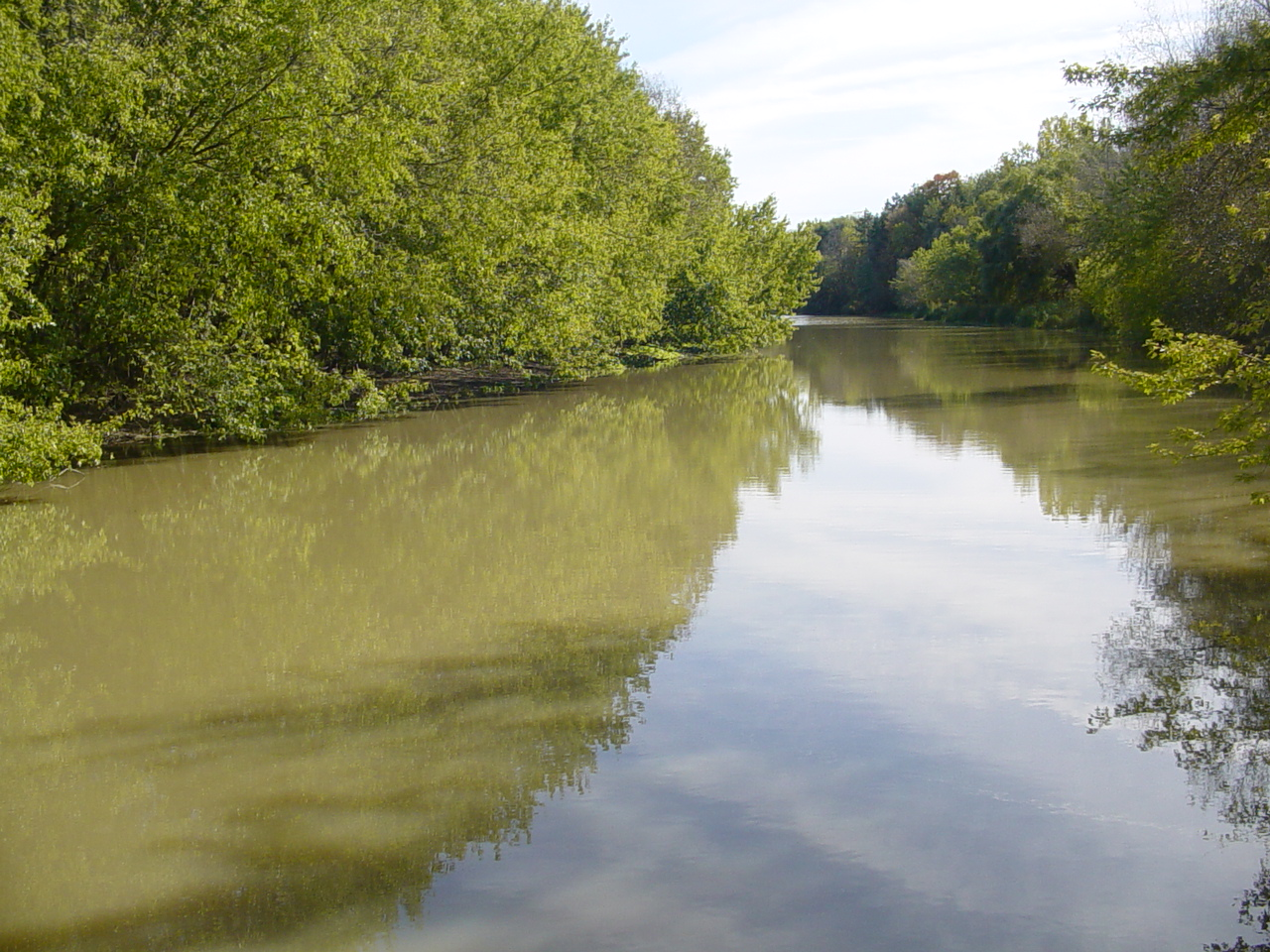
- Kettle Creek north of St. Thomas
- Interactive map of Kettle Creek

Location
- Country: Canada
- Province: Ontario
- County: Elgin

Physical characteristics
- Mouth: Lake Erie
  - location: Port Stanley

Kettle Creek is a creek in Elgin County in southwestern Ontario, Canada that empties into Lake Erie at Port Stanley. It drains an area of 520 square kilometres (200 sq mi). Dodd Creek is the major tributary.

Kettle Creek flows through parts of London, Ontario and St. Thomas, Ontario. Most of the watershed is used for agriculture. During dry summers, water shortages can be experienced. Kettle Creek adds a significant amount of phosphorus to Lake Erie.

Some of Ontario's rare remaining stands of Carolinian Forest are in the Kettle Creek watershed.

== Gallery ==
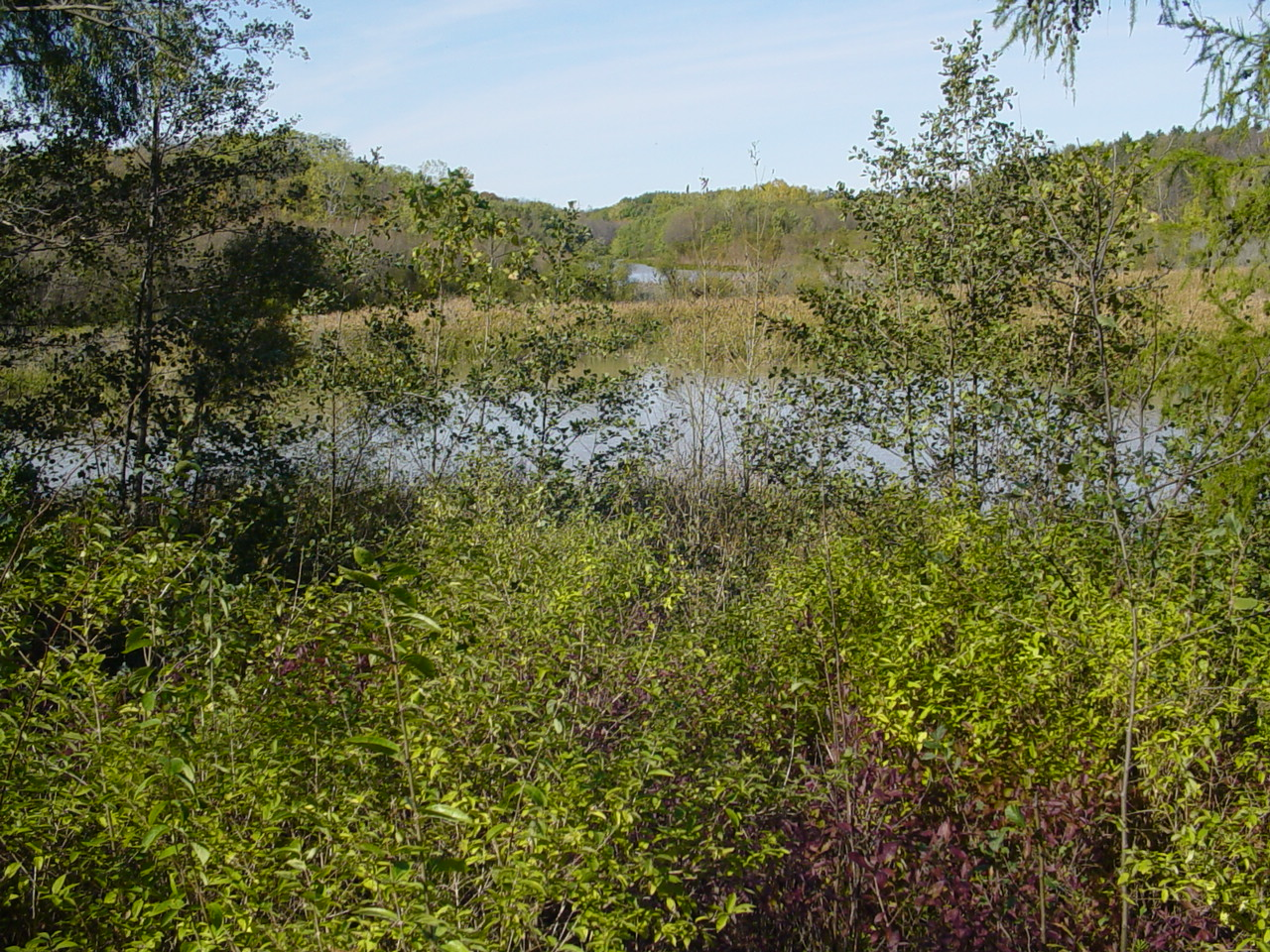
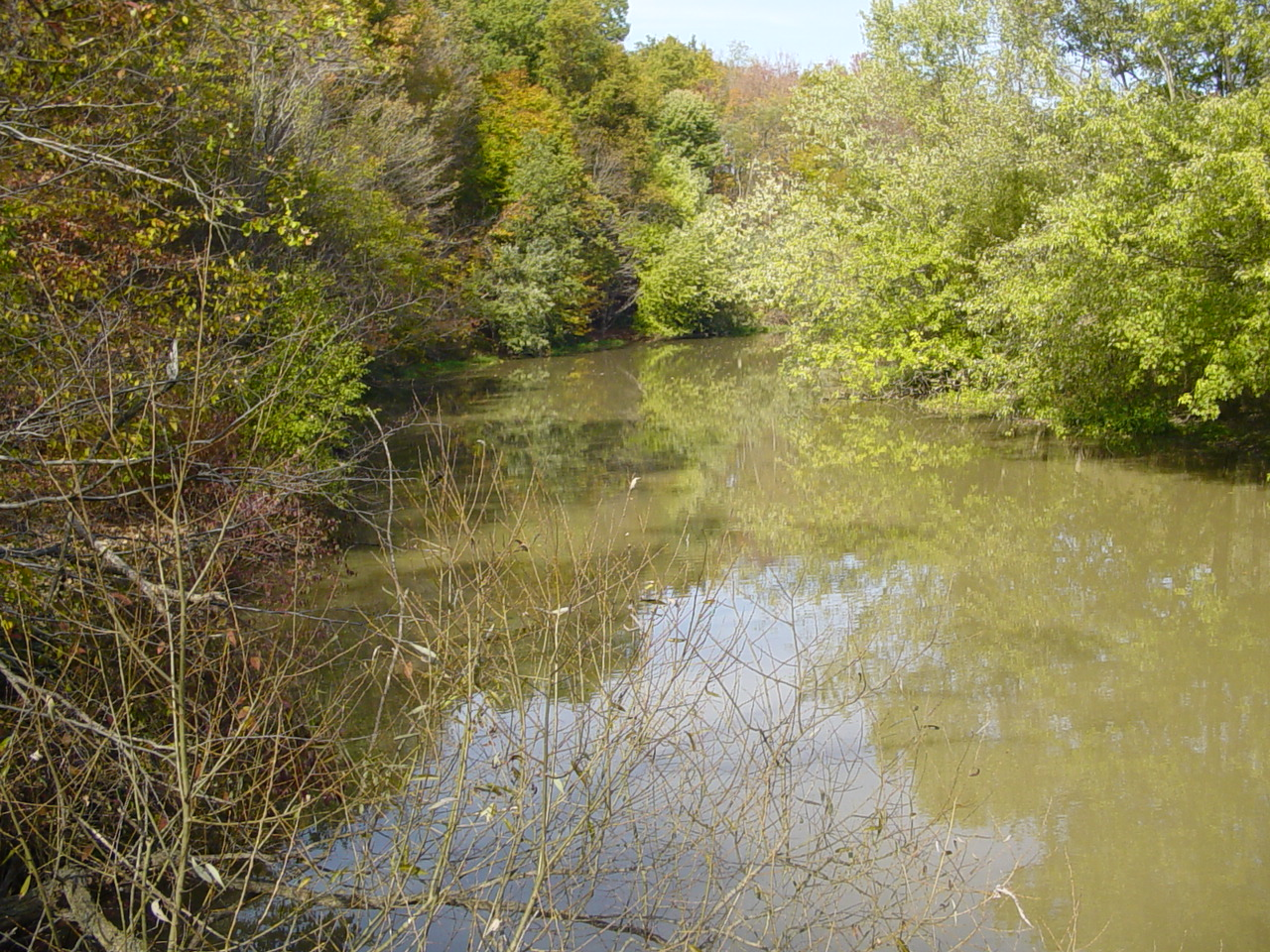

== See also ==
- List of rivers of Ontario
