= Operation Friction =

1990–91 Canadian military operation of the Gulf War

- Part of Gulf War
- HMCS Protecteur during Operation Friction
Date	24 August 1990 – 28 February 1991
Location	Persian Gulf
Result	Canadian victory

Belligerents
Canada	Iraq

Commanders and leaders
(Canada) Brian Mulroney (Canada) Bill McKnight (Canada) Kim Campbell (Canada) John de Chastelain (Canada) Charles Thomas (Canada) John Rogers Anderson (Canada) David Huddleston (Canada) Kenneth J. Summers	(Ba'athist Iraq) Saddam Hussein

Units involved
Canadian Armed Forces	Iraqi Armed Forces

Strength
(Canada) 4,500	

Casualties and losses
None	None

Operation Friction was a Canadian military operation that saw the contribution of 4,500 Canadian Forces personnel to the 1991 Gulf War. The larger US components were Operation Desert Shield and Operation Desert Storm.

Operation Friction initially saw Canadian Forces Maritime Command order the destroyers HMCS Terra Nova and HMCS Athabaskan to assist with enforcing the United Nations trade blockade against Iraq. The supply ship HMCS Protecteur was deployed with the destroyers to provide underway replenishment as well as command/control and at-sea medical services to the small task force which operated in the Persian Gulf, Straits of Hormuz and Gulf of Oman.

Canada suffered no casualties during the conflict but since its end many veterans have complained of suffering from Gulf War syndrome.

== Gulf War ==
Following UN authorization of military force to remove Iraq from occupied territory in Kuwait, AIRCOM deployed two CF-18 Hornet (24 aircraft) squadrons with support personnel from CFB Baden-Soellingen in Germany to a temporary base in Qatar. Force Mobile Command also sent a large field hospital to Qatar to deal with casualties from the expected ground war.

During the Gulf War, Canada's CF-18 squadrons were integrated with Coalition air resources and provided combat air patrols as well as being involved in attacks of ground and water targets. This was the first time since the Korean War that the Canadian military had participated in offensive combat operations.

=== Canadian components ===
Operation Friction saw approximately 4,000 CF personnel deployed to the Persian Gulf from August 1990 – February 1991 with a peak deployment of 2,700 personnel during the Gulf War in January 1991.

Personnel were primarily attached to four units in the Persian Gulf region:

- Canadian Task Group at sea
- the Canadian Air Task Group in Doha, Qatar
- the Joint Headquarters, Canadian Forces Middle East, in Manama, Bahrain
- First Canadian Field Hospital at Al-Qaysumah, Saudi Arabia

The limited capabilities of the Canadian Army had been a factor in its very limited role in the 1991 Gulf War. While the military had been asked about the feasibility of sending 4 Canadian Mechanized Brigade Group (4 CMBG) from Germany to the Gulf to participate in direct combat operations, the Canadian Forces were forced to report that Operation "Broadsword", a theoretical deployment, would likely be a failure.

==== Joint headquarters ====
The headquarters of the Canadian Forces in the Middle East was a joint headquarters established on November 6, 1990, and commanded by Commodore Kenneth J. Summers. It included a communications unit and various joint military staffs.

==== Naval operations ====
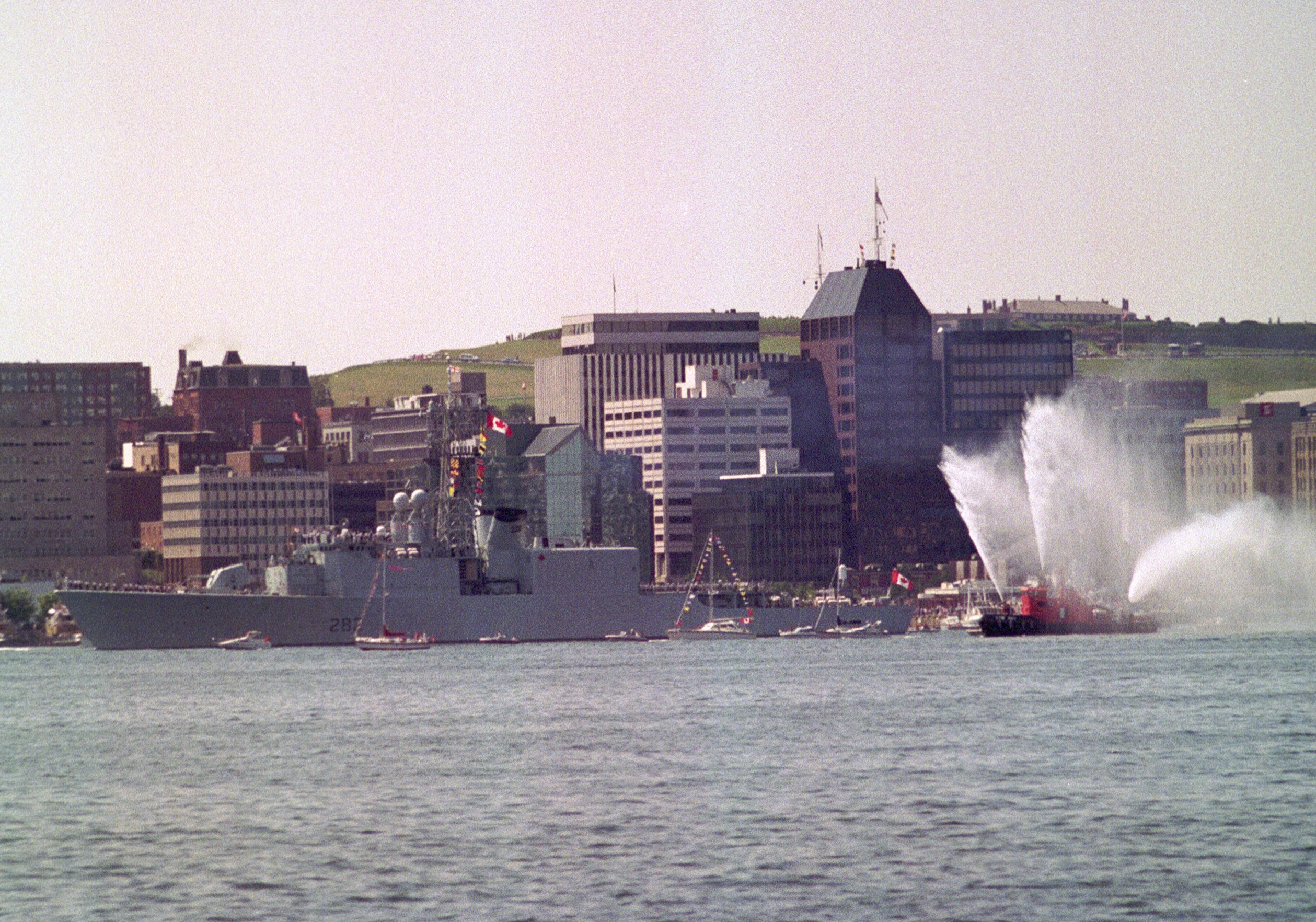
HMCS Athabaskan departs from Halifax as a part of the Coalition's naval forces.

Before the war began on January 16, 1991, Canadian naval forces patrolled the central Persian Gulf. When hostilities commenced, Captain Duncan "Dusty" Miller, Commander of the Canadian Naval Task Group, became the multinational coordinator for a large naval combat logistics area established in the southern Persian Gulf.

Two Canadian destroyers, HMCS Terra Nova and Athabaskan escorted the United States hospital ships, USNS Comfort and Mercy, the latter with CF medical staff on board. HMCS Protecteur, an auxiliary oil replenishment ship, serviced all nations involved in naval operations within the Gulf. Five Sikorsky CH-124 Sea King helicopters based at CFB Shearwater and CFB Patricia's Bay were also attached to the Naval Task Group, performing reconnaissance, mine search and destroy, air-to-ship naval interdiction, utility and command-and-liaison tasks. Another Canadian destroyer, HMCS Huron arrived in theatre after hostilities ceased and was the first allied ship to visit Kuwait.

==== Air operations ====
The Canadian Forces Air Command provided combat air patrols in the north and central areas of the Persian Gulf. These patrols worked with the coalition air forces to protect coalition naval forces and land bases from Iraqi air attacks.

As the conflict progressed, the Canadian Air Task Group took on other combat roles, such as sweep and escort for coalition bombing missions and later, air-to-ground bombing missions. Canadian pilots were credited with partially destroying an Iraqi patrol boat in the Persian Gulf, and Canadian CF-18 jets carried out 56 bombing sorties against Iraqi forces.

Canadian Forces in the Gulf were supported by Air Command’s Transport Group, providing personnel and cargo transport using a fleet of 27 CC-130 Hercules and five CC-137 Boeing 707, one of which was used in the Gulf as an air-to-air refueler for Coalition air forces. The Transport Group also provided a CC-144 Challenger in a command-and-liaison role for the deployed Commander of the Canadian Forces.

==== Canadian Field Hospital ====
On the day that the US Operation Desert Storm component of the Gulf War began, January 16, 1991, Canada announced that it would send a field hospital to the Persian Gulf region. As a result, 1 Canadian Field Hospital from CFB Petawawa, Ontario, joined the British land forces and was deployed in the Saudi Arabian desert behind 1 (UK) Armoured Division. The hospital became fully operational on February 25, 1991, only a few days before the hostilities ceased; it stopped operating on March 4, 1991.
