= Kenneth J. Summers =

Ken Summers
- Born: July 20, 1944 (age 82); St. Thomas, Canada
- Military career
- Allegiance: Canada
- Branch: Royal Canadian Navy; Canadian Forces Maritime Command
- Service years: 1963–2000
- Rank: Rear Admiral
- Commands: Canadian Forces Middle East (Gulf War)
- Conflicts: Persian Gulf War: Operation Friction (1990-1991)
- Awards: Canadian Forces' Decoration

Rear-Admiral Kenneth J. Summers CD (born July 20, 1944) is a Canadian retired naval officer, best known for being the commander of the Canadian contingent of the Persian Gulf War coalition.

== Early life and education ==
Summers was born July 20, 1944, and graduated from Royal Military College in Kingston, Ontario, in 1967 before serving as an officer both at sea and in several postings ashore. In 1989 he was promoted to commodore and appointed Commander Canadian Fleet and Chief of Staff Operations in Halifax, Nova Scotia, the appointment he was holding when Iraq invaded Kuwait in August 1990.

== Career ==
Summers assumed command of the Canadian Naval Task Force that sailed from Halifax to the Persian Gulf, and upon arrival he was appointed Commander Canadian Forces Middle East, with headquarters in Bahrain. All Canadian naval, air and land forces in the Gulf came under his command during the implementation of Operation Friction, where Canadian naval and air units engaged in combat for the first time since the Korean War.

After the Persian Gulf War, Summers served in Maritime Forces Pacific Headquarters (MARPAC HQ) as Chief of Staff to Commander MARPAC 1991. He was promoted to rear admiral and was appointed as a Commander Canadian Defence Liaison Staff Washington in 1992. He served in National Defence Headquarters, Ottawa as Chief of Personnel Planning and Resources Management 1994 and as Director General Maritime Development 1995. He was appointed Chief of Staff Operations, Supreme Allied Commander Atlantic in Norfolk, Virginia, from 1997 to 2000. He retired in 2000.

== Awards and decorations ==
Summers's personal awards and decorations include the following:

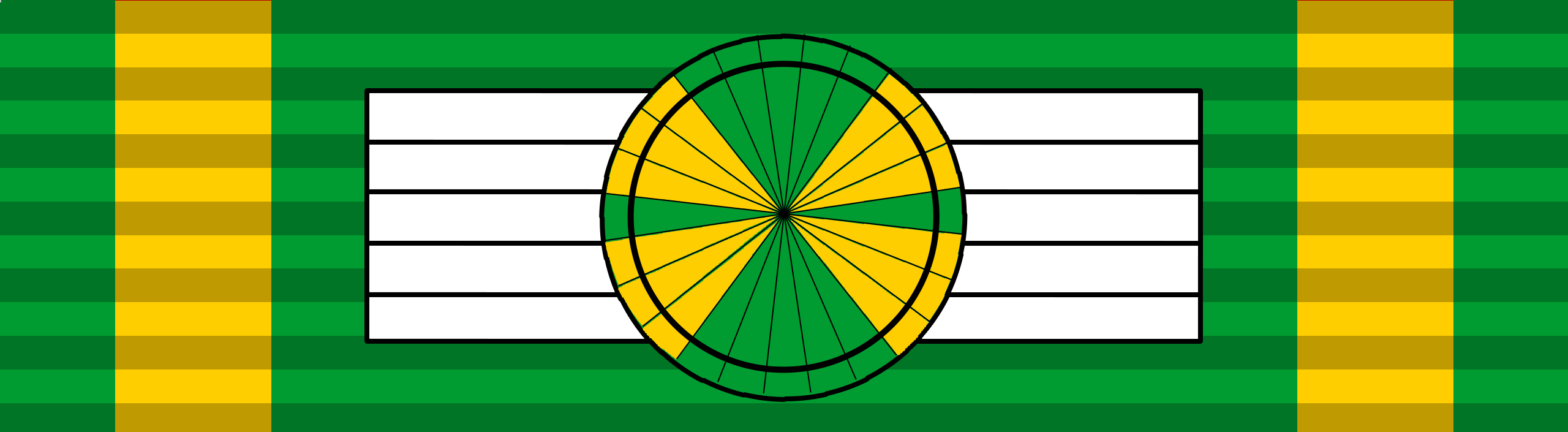

| Ribbon | Description | Notes |
| | Order of Military Merit (OMM) | Appointed Officer (OMM) on 12 December 1988 |
| | Meritorious Service Cross (MSC) | Decoration awarded on 30 August 1991; Military division (Citation) |
| | Gulf and Kuwait Medal | with Clasp 1991 |
| | Special Service Medal | with NATO-OTAN Clasp |
| | 125th Anniversary of the Confederation of Canada Medal | Decoration awarded in 1992 |
| | Queen Elizabeth II Diamond Jubilee Medal | Decoration awarded in 2012; Canadian version |
| | Canadian Forces' Decoration (CD) | with two Clasp for 32 years of services |
| | Commander of the Legion of Merit | Decoration awarded 20 January 1996; Officer level; United States award |
| | Bronze Star Medal | Decoration awarded DD MMM YYYY; United States award |
| | Order of King Abdulaziz | Decoration awarded DD MMM YYYY; Saudi Arabia award |
