= Port Stanley, Ontario =

Community in Elgin County, Ontario, Canada

Coordinates: 42.6638°N 81.2129°W

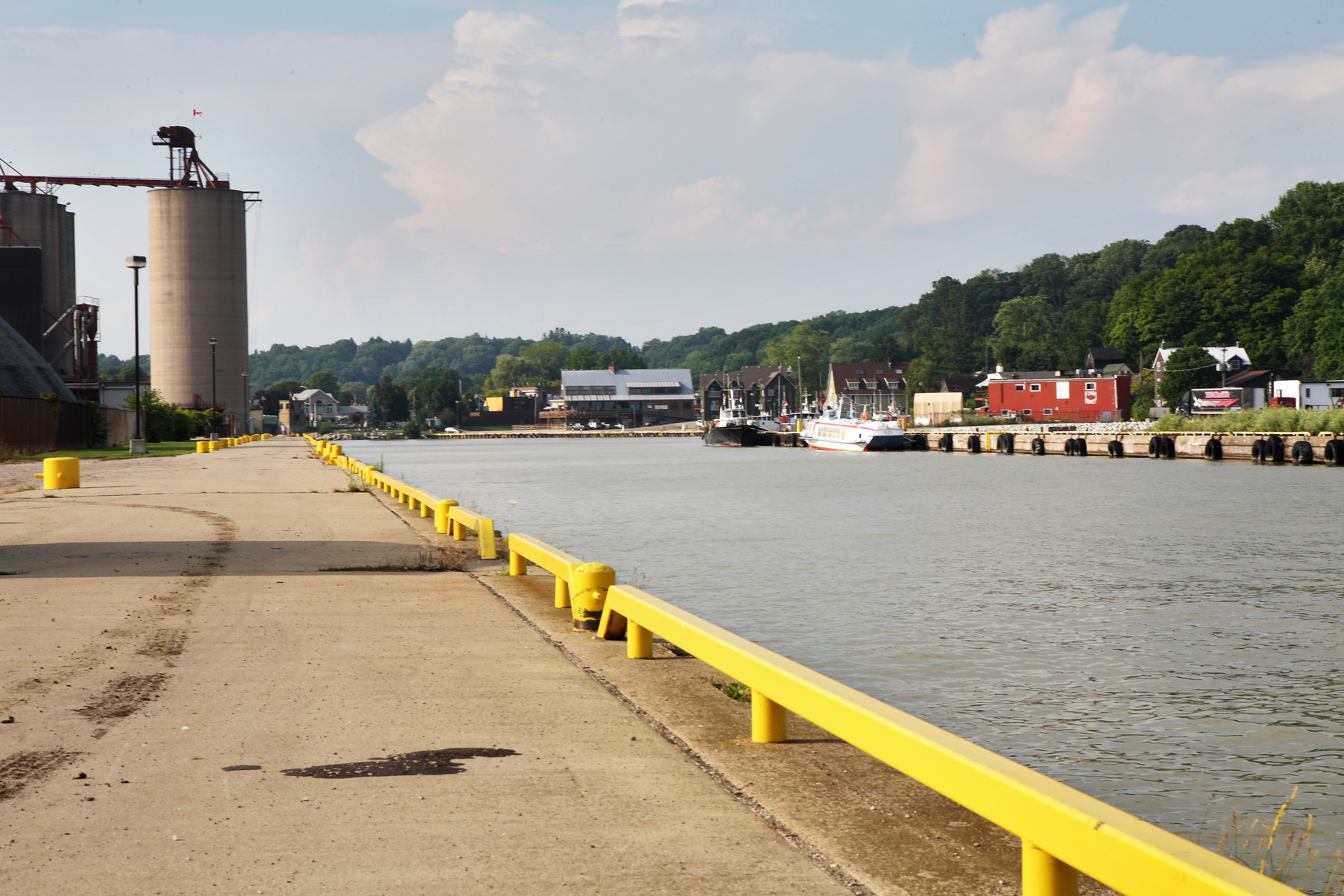
View of Port Stanley from the harbour.

Port Stanley in Ontario

Port Stanley is a community in the Municipality of Central Elgin, Elgin County in Ontario, Canada. It is located on the north shore of Lake Erie at the mouth of Kettle Creek. In the 2021 Canadian Census of Population, Port Stanley had a population of 3,008.

== History ==
The site of Port Stanley was part of an important early route from Lake Erie to other inland waterways for a succession of explorers and travellers of the 17th and 18th centuries. It was an important landing point and camping spot. Adrien Jolliet, brother of Louis Jolliet, landed at this location in 1669 during the first exploration of the Great Lakes by Europeans. Other notable visitors included François Dollier de Casson and René de Bréhant de Galinée (1670), Jean-Baptiste Céloron de Blainville (1749) and Sir William Johnson (1761). In commemoration of this role, a site bounded by Bridge, Main and Colbourne Streets was designated a National Historic Site of Canada in 1923, and was marked with a cairn.

Lieutenant-Colonel John Bostwick received the first land grant, and settled in what is now Port Stanley in 1804. Around 1824, it was renamed Port Stanley after Edward Smith-Stanley, 14th Earl of Derby, who had visited nearby Port Talbot. Lord Stanley later became Prime Minister of the United Kingdom and the father of Frederick Stanley, 16th Earl of Derby, Governor General of Canada, ice hockey enthusiast and donor of the first Stanley Cup in 1893.

== Economy ==
Port Stanley has a large sheltered harbour that was operated by Transport Canada, but has been divested to the Municipality of Central Elgin. Historically, these facilities supported trade in coal and wood between Southwestern Ontario and the United States. Today, most of these facilities are dormant, but a commercial freshwater fishery operates from the harbour.

== Attractions ==
Attractions include a large sandy beach, King George VI Lift Bridge (a lifting bridge across Kettle Creek opened in May 1939), marinas, restaurants, hotels, shops, the Port Stanley Festival Theatre in the former town hall building on Bridge Street, and the Port Stanley Terminal Rail, which operates a tourist train between St. Thomas, Ontario and Port Stanley using a portion of the former L&PS rail line, the London and Port Stanley Railway.

In 1926, the L&PS Pavilion opened. It was later renamed the Stork Club (not to be confused with the famous New York establishment), and had a 13,000-square-foot (1,200 m^{2}) dance floor, the largest dance floor in the London-Port Stanley area; the club was famous for swing dance and big band and attracted several big names to play there. It was closed by health authorities in 1973 because it could not earn the revenue to keep the building up. H.J. McManus, a London businessman, bought it and his son, Joe Jr., led the renovations, reopening in 1974 with the Harry James Orchestra performing before a sellout crowd. The last event was a performance by Day Break on New Year's Eve of 1978/79; a fire in a dumpster 12 days later damaged the building too heavily to save it.

In the first decade of the 21st century, there were numerous proposals to operate a ferry between Port Stanley and Cleveland, Ohio.

== Media ==
The Port Stanley News was formerly a locally operated news and current events Website/blog that served the Port Stanley area however it is no longer active.

The Lake Erie Beacon was a tabloid community newspaper published bi-weekly, with a distribution of 7000 printed copies and 800 electronic copies however it has ceased publication.

== Climate ==
Port Stanley has a humid continental climate modified somewhat by the waters of Lake Erie.

Climate data for Port Stanley (1981−2010)
Month	Jan	Feb	Mar	Apr	May	Jun	Jul	Aug	Sep	Oct	Nov	Dec	Year
Record high °C (°F)	14.4 (57.9)	13.0 (55.4)	21.0 (69.8)	27.2 (81.0)	31.7 (89.1)	34.4 (93.9)	34.4 (93.9)	33.9 (93.0)	31.7 (89.1)	25.6 (78.1)	20.0 (68.0)	15.5 (59.9)	34.4 (93.9)
Mean daily maximum °C (°F)	−1.1 (30.0)	−0.2 (31.6)	4.3 (39.7)	11.0 (51.8)	17.8 (64.0)	22.3 (72.1)	25.5 (77.9)	24.7 (76.5)	20.7 (69.3)	14.3 (57.7)	7.8 (46.0)	1.6 (34.9)	12.4 (54.3)
Daily mean °C (°F)	−4.9 (23.2)	−4.3 (24.3)	0.1 (32.2)	6.5 (43.7)	12.7 (54.9)	17.3 (63.1)	20.3 (68.5)	19.5 (67.1)	15.7 (60.3)	9.5 (49.1)	4.1 (39.4)	−1.8 (28.8)	7.9 (46.2)
Mean daily minimum °C (°F)	−8.6 (16.5)	−8.3 (17.1)	−4.1 (24.6)	2.0 (35.6)	7.6 (45.7)	12.2 (54.0)	15.0 (59.0)	14.2 (57.6)	10.6 (51.1)	4.7 (40.5)	0.4 (32.7)	−5.3 (22.5)	3.4 (38.1)
Record low °C (°F)	−32.8 (−27.0)	−32.0 (−25.6)	−27.2 (−17.0)	−16.7 (1.9)	−5.0 (23.0)	−0.6 (30.9)	3.3 (37.9)	0.0 (32.0)	−2.2 (28.0)	−8.3 (17.1)	−18.9 (−2.0)	−31.7 (−25.1)	−32.8 (−27.0)
Average precipitation mm (inches)	60.1 (2.37)	62.5 (2.46)	74.5 (2.93)	85.2 (3.35)	80.3 (3.16)	93.3 (3.67)	95.9 (3.78)	118.5 (4.67)	104.9 (4.13)	87.0 (3.43)	116.2 (4.57)	102.4 (4.03)	1,080.7 (42.55)
Average rainfall mm (inches)	33.1 (1.30)	39.0 (1.54)	60.2 (2.37)	82.5 (3.25)	80.3 (3.16)	93.3 (3.67)	95.9 (3.78)	118.5 (4.67)	104.9 (4.13)	86.1 (3.39)	111.5 (4.39)	82.2 (3.24)	987.5 (38.88)
Average snowfall cm (inches)	27.0 (10.6)	23.5 (9.3)	14.3 (5.6)	2.7 (1.1)	0.0 (0.0)	0.0 (0.0)	0.0 (0.0)	0.0 (0.0)	0.0 (0.0)	0.92 (0.36)	4.8 (1.9)	20.2 (8.0)	93.2 (36.7)
Average precipitation days (≥ 0.2 mm)	12.9	10.8	12.9	14.4	13.2	11.1	11.9	12.0	13.4	13.8	15.6	14.3	156.3
Average rainy days (≥ 0.2 mm)	5.1	5.2	9.4	13.5	13.2	11.1	11.9	12.0	13.4	13.7	14.8	8.9	132.2
Average snowy days (≥ 0.2 cm)	8.6	6.9	4.3	1.0	0.0	0.0	0.0	0.0	0.0	0.25	1.1	6.6	28.7
Source: Environment Canada
