= List of preserved GE locomotives =

A number of locomotives constructed by General Electric (GE) have been preserved in museums, on tourist railroads, and various other locations across the world. Each locomotive is listed by serial number.

== Switchers ==
=== 25-ton ===
Photograph	Works no.	Locomotive	Build date	Former operators	Retire date	Disposition and location	Notes	References
	15853	CTA MS-65	September 1942	Columbia Steel; Duffy and Son; Chicago Transit Authority (CTA)	2020	Operational at the Fox River Trolley Museum in South Elgin, Illinois		
	30591	Missouri-Kansas-Texas 400	May 1950	Missouri–Kansas–Texas Railroad (MKT); Alan Ritchey Inc. (ALR)	-	Under restoration at the Oklahoma Railway Museum in Oklahoma City, Oklahoma		
	30827	Ellwood National Forge 188	November 1950	Pennsylvania Power Company; Ellwood National Forge	December 2008	Operational at the Lake Shore Railway Museum in North East, Pennsylvania		
	31561	Hartford Electric Light 52	April 1952	Hartford Electric Light Company (HELCo)	2005	Display at the Railroad Museum of New England in Thomaston, Connecticut		
	33375	Long Island Rail Road 399	August 1958	Long Island Rail Road (LIRR)	-	Operational at the Railroad Museum of Long Island in Riverhead, New York		

=== 44-ton ===
Photograph	Works no.	Locomotive	Build date	Former operators	Retire date	Disposition and location	Notes	References
	15757	United States Army 7069	December 1942	United States Army (USAX); US Air Force (USAF)	-	Operational at the Georgia State Railroad Museum in Savannah, Georgia		
	30472	Nickel Plate Road 91	September 1950	Boyne City Railroad (BCRR)	-	Operational at Indiana Transportation Museum in Noblesville, Indiana		

=== 45-ton ===
Photograph	Works no.	Locomotive	Build date	Former operators	Retire date	Disposition and location	Notes	References
	13059	Oklahoma Railway Museum 301	May 1941	United States Army (USAX); Dodge City, Ford and Bucklin Railroad (DCFB); Vulcan Chemical Co.	-	Operational at the Oklahoma Railway Museum in Oklahoma City, Oklahoma		
	28467	Aurora, Elgin and Fox River Electric 5	June 1946	Aurora, Elgin and Fox River Electric Company (AE&FRE); Chicago Gravel Company	-	Operational at the Fox River Trolley Museum in South Elgin, Illinois		

=== 65-ton ===
Photograph	Works no.	Locomotive	Build date	Former operators	Retire date	Disposition and location	Notes	References
	17886	White Mountain Central 1943	August 1943	United States Army (USAX); Newport Dinner Train	-	Operational at the White Mountain Central Railroad in Lincoln, New Hampshire		

=== 70-ton ===
Photograph	Works no.	Locomotive	Build date	Former operators	Retire date	Disposition and location	Notes	References
	29088	Barre & Chelsea Railroad 14	October 1947	Barre & Chelsea Railroad (B&C); Montpelier & Barre Railroad (M&B)	-	Static display at the Vermont Granite Museum in Barre, Vermont		
	29466	High Point, Thomasville and Denton Engine 202	January 1948	High Point, Thomasville and Denton Railroad (HPT&D); Laurinburg and Southern Railroad (L&S); Franklin County Railroad (FC)	-	Operational at Denton FarmPark in Denton, North Carolina		
	30032	Downeast Scenic 54	December 1948	Berlin Mills; Belfast and Moosehead Lake (BML)	-	Operational at the Downeast Scenic Railroad in Ellsworth, Maine		
	30034	Southern Pacific 5100	April 1949	Southern Pacific Transportation Company (SP)	-	Stored, serviceable at the Oregon Pacific Railroad, in Milwaukie, Oregon		
	30166	Southern Pacific 5103	May 1949	Southern Pacific Transportation Company (SP); Chrome Crankshaft (CC); Stauffer Chemical Company (SCCo); Rhone-Poulenc Chemical (RPC)	July 1, 1975	Stored at the Sumpter Valley Railway in McEwen, Oregon		
	30437	Baltimore & Annapolis 50	January 1950	Baltimore and Annapolis Railroad (BA)	-	Displayed at the National Museum of Railroad History & Innovation in Baltimore, Maryland		
	32284	Southern Pacific 5119	May 1955	Southern Pacific Transportation Company (SP); San Diego and Arizona Eastern Railway (SD&AE); Modesto and Empire Traction Company (METCo.)	October 1967	Operational at the Pacific Southwest Railway Museum Association in Campo, California		

=== 75-ton "Drop Cab" ===
Photograph	Works no.	Locomotive	Build date	Former operators	Retire date	Disposition and location	Notes	References
	27528	USATC 7228, then SE D-4028, later CFTA BB-4028	March 1944	US Army Transportation Corps; Société générale des chemins de fer économiques (SE); Chemins de fer et transport automobile (CFTA)	-	Static display at the Écomusée de Marquèzes in Sabres, Landes, France		
	27529	USATC 7229, then SE D-4029, later CFTA BB-4029	1944	US Army Transportation Corps; Société générale des chemins de fer économiques (SE); Chemins de fer et transport automobile (CFTA)	-	Derelict in Saint-Symphorien, Gironde, France		
	27532	USATC 7232, then SE D-4032, later CFTA BB-4032	1944	US Army Transportation Corps; Société générale des chemins de fer économiques (SE); Chemins de fer et transport automobile (CFTA)	-	Undergoing restoration at the Chemin de Fer Touristique du Rhin in Volgelsheim, France	Equipped with Baudouin V8 engines	
	27533	USATC 7233, then SE D-4033, later CFTA BB-4033	April 1944	US Army Transportation Corps; Société générale des chemins de fer économiques (SE); Chemins de fer et transport automobile (CFTA)	-	Operationnal at the Train Touristique de Guîtres à Marcenais in Guîtres, France	Registered as a Monument historique	
	27536	USATC 7236, then SE D-4036, later CFTA BB-4036	1944	US Army Transportation Corps; Société générale des chemins de fer économiques (SE); Chemins de fer et transport automobile (CFTA)	-	Undergoing restoration at the Chemin de Fer Touristique du Rhin in Volgelsheim, France	Equipped with Baudouin V8 engines	

=== 125-ton ===
Photograph	Works no.	Locomotive	Build date	Former operators	Retire date	Disposition and location	Notes	References
	41109	Coopersville and Marne 7209	February 1979	Consumers Power Company (CPOX)	-	Operational at the Coopersville and Marne Railway (CPMY) in Coopersville, Michigan	"SL-125"	

=== 132-ton ===
Photograph	Works no.	Locomotive	Build date	Former operators	Retire date	Disposition and location	Notes	References
	12569	Wellsville, Addison & Galeton 1700	March 1940	Ford Motor Company; Wellsville, Addison and Galeton Railroad (WAG)	-	Display at the Lake Shore Railway Museum in North East, Pennsylvania		

== Universal Series ==
=== U23B ===
Photograph	Works no.	Locomotive	Build date	Model	Former operators	Retire date	Disposition and location	Notes	References
	38398	Ohio Central 4092	July 1964	B23-7S	Western Pacific Railroad (WP); Monongahela Railway (MGA); Conrail (CR); CSX Transportation (CSX); Ohio Central Railroad (OHCR)	-	Donated to the Age of Steam Roundhouse in Sugarcreek, Ohio.	Built as a U23B, rebuilt into a B23-7S. Originally slated to be scrapped by the EPA, but was instead spared from scrap.	
	40127	CSX 9553	1975	U23B	CSX; Louisville & Nashville (L&N)		Operational at the Southern Appalachia Railway Museum in Oak Ridge, Tennessee		
	41518	GC 3965	1977	U23B	Georgia Central (GC); Norfolk Southern (NS); Southern (SOU)		Stored at the Southern Appalachia Railway Museum in Oak Ridge, Tennessee		
	41593	Naugatuck Railroad 2203	1977	U23B	Conrail (CR); Providence and Worcester (PW)		Operational at the Railroad Museum of New England in Thomaston, Connecticut	Last Universal Series locomotive built	

=== U25B ===
Photograph	Works no.	Locomotive	Build date	Model	Former operators	Retire date	Disposition and location	Notes	References
	34700	Southern Pacific 3100	March 29, 1963	U25BE	Southern Pacific Transportation Company (SP)	December 17, 1986	Operational at the Southern California Railway Museum in Perris, California.		
	34986	New York Central 2500	1963	U25B	New York Central (NYC); Penn Central (PC); Conrail (CR)	-	On static display at the Lake Shore Railway Museum in North East, Pennsylvania		
	35133	Louisville and Nashville 1616	July 1964	U25B	Louisville and Nashville (L&N); Seaboard System Railroad (SBD); CSX Transportation (CSX); Vintage Locomotives Inc. (VLIX)	-	Stored at the Southern Appalachia Railway Museum in Oak Ridge, Tennessee		
	35639	Milwaukee Road 5056	July 1965	U25B	Milwaukee Road (MILW)		Awaiting restoration at the Illinois Railway Museum in Union, Illinois		
	35640	Milwaukee Road 5057	July 1965	U25B	Milwaukee Road (MILW)		Under restoration by the Cascade Rail Foundation in Usk, Washington		
	35733	New Haven 2525	November 1965	U25B	New Haven (NH); Penn Central (PC); Conrail (CR)		In storage at the Railroad Museum of New England in Thomaston, Connecticut.		

=== U28B ===
Photograph	Works no.	Locomotive	Build date	Model	Former operators	Retire date	Disposition and location	Notes	References
	36119	TTI 260	January 1967	U28B	Transkentucky Transportation (TTI); Burlington Northern (BN); Chicago, Burlington, & Quincy (CB&Q)	2019	Operational at the Illinois Railway Museum in Union, Illinois		

=== U28C ===
Photograph	Works no.	Locomotive	Build date	Model	Former operators	Retire date	Disposition and location	Notes	References
	36018	Union Pacific 2804	June 1966	U28C	Union Pacific Railroad (UP)	1995	Display at the National Museum of Transportation in Kirkwood, Missouri	Cutaway for training / educational purposes	

=== U30B ===
Photograph	Works no.	Locomotive	Build date	Model	Former operators	Retire date	Disposition and location	Notes	References
	36451	Western Pacific 3051	September 1967	U30B	Western Pacific Railroad (WP)	1985	Undergoing cosmetic restoration at the Western Pacific Railroad Museum		

=== U36B ===
Photograph	Works no.	Locomotive	Build date	Model	Former operators	Retire date	Disposition and location	Notes	References
	36451	CSX 7764	1970	U36B	Seaboard Coast Line (SCL); Seaboard System (SBD); CSX Transportation (CSXT); Massachusetts Call Volunteer Firefighters Association (MCVX)		On static display at the Lake Shore Railway Museum in North East, Pennsylvania		

=== U25C ===
Photograph	Works no.	Locomotive	Build date	Model	Former operators	Retire date	Disposition and location	Notes	References
	35063	Lake Superior and Ishpeming 2501	July 1964	U25C	Lake Superior and Ishpeming Railroad (LS&I)	-	On static display at Lake Shore Boulevard in Marquette, Michigan		

=== U30C ===
Photograph	Works no.	Locomotive	Build date	Model	Former operators	Retire date	Disposition and location	Notes	References
	36318	RDG 6300	June 1967	U30C	Reading (RDG)		On static display at the Reading Company Museum in Hamburg, Pennsylvania		
	38243	Burlington Northern 5802	January 1972	U30C	Burlington Northern Railroad (BN)		On static display in Gillette, Wyoming		
	38090	DOTX 1	June 1971	U30C	US Department of Transportation (DOTX)		On static display at the Pueblo Railway Museum in Pueblo, Colorado.		
	39942	Burlington Northern 5383	October 1974	U30C	Burlington Northern Railroad (BN)	-	Operational at the Illinois Railway Museum in Union, Illinois		

=== U34CH ===
Photograph	Works no.	Locomotive	Build date	Former operators	Retire date	Disposition and location	Notes	References
	37650	New Jersey Transit 3372	April 1971	Erie Lackawanna Railway (EL); Conrail (CR); New Jersey Transit (NJT)	-	Undergoing restoration, Owned by the United Railroad Historical Society of New Jersey in Boonton, New Jersey		

=== U36C ===
Photograph	Works no.	Locomotive	Build date	Model	Former operators	Retire date	Disposition and location	Notes	References
	38890	Minnesota Commercial 50	1973	SF30C	Minnesota Commercial (MNNR); Atchison, Topeka & Santa Fe (ATSF)	2022	Under ownership of the Arizona Railway Museum	Built as a U36C, rebuilt into an SF30C	

== Dash 7 line ==
=== B23-7 ===
Works no.	Locomotive	Build date	Model	Former operators	Retire date	Disposition and location	Notes	References
41740	Providence and Worcester 2201	March 1978	B23-7	Providence and Worcester (PW)	2019	Stored at the Railroad Museum of New England in Thomaston, Connecticut		

=== B30-7 ===
Photograph	Works no.	Locomotive	Build date	Model	Former operators	Retire date	Disposition and location	Notes	References
	41873	Southern Pacific 7815	March 1978	B30-7	Southern Pacific Transportation Company (SP); Wimpey Materials Inc. (WIMX)	-	Owned by the Midwest Overland Rail Preservation Society in Perry, Oklahoma		
	42248	Southern Pacific 7863	April 1979	B30-7	Southern Pacific Transportation Company (SP); Union Pacific Railroad (UP)	January 29, 2001	Stored at Revolution Rail Company in South Fork, Colorado		
	42777	Chesapeake and Ohio 8272	January 1980	B30-7	Chessie System (C&O); CSX Transportation (CSX)	2009	On static display at the Lake Shore Railway Museum in North East, Pennsylvania		

=== C30-7 ===
Photograph	Works no.	Locomotive	Build date	Model	Former operators	Retire date	Disposition and location	Notes	References
	43064	Louisville and Nashville 7067	August 1980	C30-7	Louisville and Nashville Railroad (L&N); Seaboard System Railroad (SBD); CSX Transportation (CSX)	1999	Operational, under ownership of Kentucky Steam Heritage Corporation in Irvine, Kentucky		

== Dash 8 line ==
=== B32-8 ===
Photograph	Works no.	Locomotive	Build date	Model	Former operators	Retire date	Disposition and location	Notes	References
	46134	Western Maryland Scenic 539	1989	B32-8	Norfolk Southern Railway (NS); Northern Illinois & Wisconsin Railway (NIWX)	-	Operational at the Western Maryland Scenic Railroad in Cumberland, Maryland.		
	46153	Western Maryland Scenic 558	1989	B32-8	Norfolk Southern Railway (NS); Northern Illinois & Wisconsin Railway (NIWX)	-	Operational at the Western Maryland Scenic Railroad in Cumberland, Maryland.		
	46158	Western Maryland Scenic 561	1989	B32-8	Norfolk Southern Railway (NS); Northern Illinois & Wisconsin Railway (NIWX)	-	Operational at the Western Maryland Scenic Railroad in Cumberland, Maryland.		
	46158	Norfolk Southern 3563	1989	B32-8	Norfolk Southern Railway (NS)	-	On static display at the Lake Shore Railway Museum in North East, Pennsylvania		

=== B40-8 ===
Photograph	Works no.	Locomotive	Build date	Model	Former operators	Retire date	Disposition and location	Notes	References
	45697	Union Pacific 1848	1988	B40-8	St Louis Southwestern (SSW); Union Pacific (UP)	2014	Operational at the Illinois Railway Museum in Union, Illinois		

=== B40-8W ===
Photograph	Works no.	Locomotive	Build date	Model	Former operators	Retire date	Disposition and location	Notes	References
	46441	ATSF 537	1990	B40-8W	Atchison, Topeka & Santa Fe (ATSF); BNSF	2024	Operational at Railroading Heritage of Midwest America in Silvis, IL		

=== C40-8CM ===
Photograph	Works no.	Locomotive	Build date	Model	Former operators	Retire date	Disposition and location	Notes	References
	46313	BCOL 4618	1990	C40-8CM	British Columbia Railway (BCOL); Canadian National (CN)		Under ownership of the Alberta Railway Museum		

== AC series ==
=== AC6000CW ===
Photograph	Works no.	Locomotive	Build date	Model	Former operators	Retire date	Disposition and location	Notes	References
	50945	GE Transportation 6002	2000	AC6000CW	Union Pacific Railroad (UP); GE Transportation (GECX)	-	On static display at the Lake Shore Railway Museum in North East, Pennsylvania		

== Genesis series ==
=== P32AC-DM ===
Photograph	Works no.	Locomotive	Build date	Model	Former operators	Retire date	Disposition and location	Notes	References
	52830	Metro-North 221	July 2001	P32AC-DM	Metro-North Railroad (MNCW)	2026	To be operated at the Adirondack Railroad in Utica, New York	First P32 and first, confirmable, genesis unit in preservation.	

== Electric ==
=== Little Joe ===
Photograph	Works no.	Locomotive	Build date	Former operators	Retire date	Disposition and location	Notes	References
	29927	Milwaukee Road E70	December 1948	Milwaukee Road (MILW)	-	On static display in Deer Lodge, Montana		
	29931	Chicago, South Shore and South Bend 802	May 1949	Chicago, South Shore and South Bend (CSS)	-	On static display at the Lake Shore Railway Museum (LSRM) in North East, Pennsylvania		
	29932	Chicago, South Shore and South Bend 803	May 1949	Chicago, South Shore and South Bend (CSS)	-	Operational at the Illinois Railway Museum (IRM) in Union, Illinois		

=== GG1 ===
Photograph	Works no.	Locomotive	Build date	Model	Former operators	Retire date	Disposition and location	Notes	References
	11646	Pennsylvania Railroad 4800	August 1934	Pennsylvania GG1	Pennsylvania Railroad (PRR); Penn Central Transportation Company (PC); Conrail (CR)	-	Static display at the Railroad Museum of Pennsylvania	Built as the prototype for the GG1.	

=== E60 ===
Photograph	Works no.	Locomotive	Build date	Model	Former operators	Retire date	Disposition and location	Notes	References
	38413	Black Mesa and Lake Powell 6001	December 1972	E60C	Black Mesa and Lake Powell Railroad (BLKM)	-	Display at the Arizona State Railroad Museum		
	39536	New Jersey Transit 958	November 1975	E60CH	Amtrak (AMTK); New Jersey Transit (NJT)	-	Awaiting cosmetic restoration at the United Railroad Historical Society of New Jersey		
	39542	Amtrak 603	June 1976	E60MA	Amtrak (AMTK)	-	Static display at the Railroad Museum of Pennsylvania		

=== EF ===
Photograph	Works no.	Locomotive	Build date	Model	Former operators	Retire date	Disposition and location	Notes	References
	5022A	Milwaukee Road 10200A+B	September 1915	EF-1	Milwaukee Road (MILW)	-	Static display at the Lake Superior Railroad Museum in Duluth, Minnesota		
	5110B	Milwaukee Road 10211B	February 1916	ES-3	Milwaukee Road (MILW)	-	Static display in Harlowton, Montana		

=== S-Motor ===
Photograph	Works no.	Locomotive	Build date	Model	Former operators	Retire date	Disposition and location	Notes	References
	29935	New York Central 100	October 1904	S-1	New York Central Railroad (NYC)	-	Awaiting restoration at the Danbury Railway Museum in Danbury, Connecticut	Prototype for the S-Motors	
	29948	New York Central 113	September 1906	S-2	New York Central Railroad (NYC)	-	Static display at the National Museum of Transportation in Kirkwood, Missouri		
	29950	New York Central 115	October 1906	S-2	New York Central Railroad (NYC); Penn Central (PC); Conrail (CR)	-	Static display at the Illinois Railway Museum in Union, Illinois		

=== T-Motor ===
Photograph	Works no.	Locomotive	Build date	Model	Former operators	Retire date	Disposition and location	Notes	References
	66710	New York Central 278	September 1926	T-3a	New York Central Railroad (NYC)	-	Awaiting restoration at the Danbury Railway Museum in Danbury, Connecticut		

=== EL-C ===
Photograph	Works no.	Locomotive	Build date	Model	Former operators	Retire date	Disposition and location	Notes	References
	32544	Conrail 4601	October 1956	EL-C	Virginian Railway (VGN); Norfolk and Western (N&W); New Haven (NH); Penn Central (PC); Conrail (CR)	-	Static display at the Illinois Railway Museum in Union, Illinois		
	32548	Virginian Railway 135	November 1956	EL-C	Virginian Railway (VGN); Norfolk and Western (N&W); New Haven (NH); Penn Central (PC); Conrail (CR)	-	Static display at the Virginia Museum of Transportation in Roanoke, Virginia		

=== E44 ===
Photograph	Works no.	Locomotive	Build date	Model	Former operators	Retire date	Disposition and location	Notes	References
	34011	Pennsylvania Railroad 4465	July 1963	E44	Pennsylvania Railroad (PRR); Penn Central (PC); Conrail (CR); Amtrak (AMTK)	-	Static display at the Railroad Museum of Pennsylvania in Strasburg, Pennsylvania		

=== EP-2 ===
Photograph	Works no.	Locomotive	Build date	Model	Former operators	Retire date	Disposition and location	Notes	References
	6979	Milwaukee Road E-2	November 1918	EP-2	Milwaukee Road (MILW)	-	Static display at the National Museum of Transportation in Kirkwood, Missouri		

== Gas Turbine ==
Photograph	Works no.	Locomotive	Build date	Former operators	Retire date	Disposition and location	Notes	References
	34069	Union Pacific 18	August 1960	Union Pacific Railroad (UP)	February 1970	Display at the Illinois Railway Museum in Union, Illinois		
	34085	Union Pacific 26	February 1961	Union Pacific Railroad (UP)	-	Display at the Ogden Union Station in Ogden, Utah		

== Formerly preserved, scrapped ==
=== U25B ===
Works no.	Locomotive	Build date	Model	Former operators	Retire date	Last seen	Scrap date	Notes	References
34996	New York Central 2510	May 1964	U25B	New York Central Railroad (NYC); Penn Central Transportation Company (PC); Conrail (CR)	-	Glenmont, New York	2022		

=== C30-7 ===
Photograph	Works no.	Locomotive	Build date	Model	Former operators	Retire date	Last seen	Scrap date	Notes	References
	43697	New Hope and Ivyland 7087	November 1981	C30-7	Seaboard Coast Line Railroad (SCL); CSX Transportation (CSXT); New Hope Railroad (NHRR)	-	New Hope, Pennsylvania	2021		

== See also ==
- List of preserved EMD locomotives
