= Port Stanley Terminal Rail =

Railway in Ontario, Canada

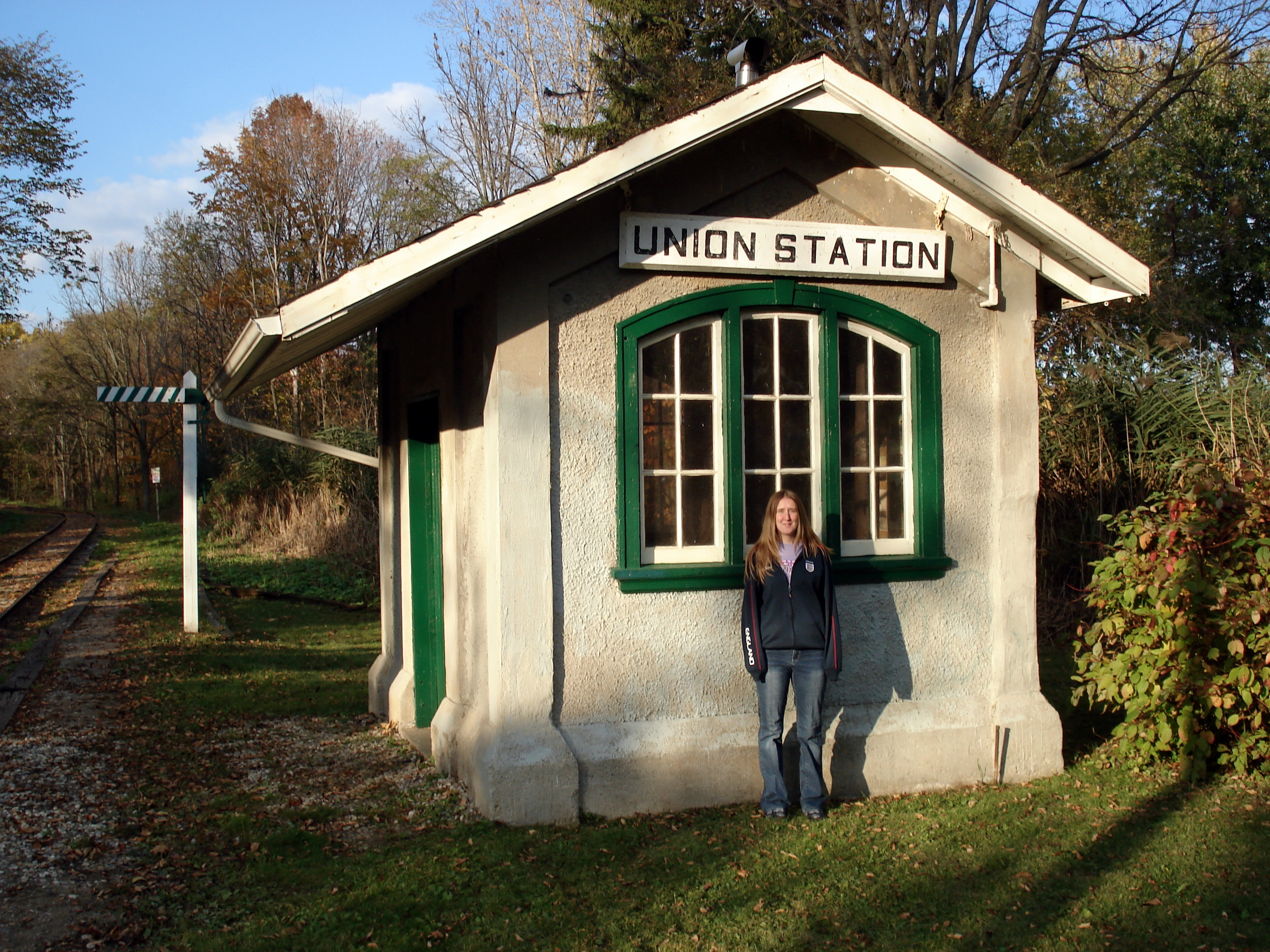
- Union Station along the line.
- Locale: Ontario
- Terminus: Port Stanley; St. Thomas
- Coordinates: 42.6650°N 81.2146°W

Commercial operations
- Built by: London and Port Stanley Railway
- Original gauge: 4 ft 8 1/2 in (1,435 mm)
- Original electrification: 1913

Preserved operations
- Owned by: Port Stanley Terminal Rail Inc.
- Operated by: Port Stanley Terminal Rail
- Stations: 2
- Preserved gauge: 4 ft 8 1/2 in (1,435 mm)
- Preserved electrification: None

Commercial history
- Opened: 1856
- Closed to passengers: 1957

Preservation history
- 1983: Tourist trains started operating
- 1987: Receipt of a provincial charter to operate passenger trains after track repairs were completed.
- Headquarters: Port Stanley

Website
- http://www.pstr.on.ca

The Port Stanley Terminal Rail (PSTR) is a heritage railway that passes over the historic tracks of The London and Port Stanley Railway (L&PS) between Port Stanley and St. Thomas, Ontario. The tourist trains began operating in 1983, after volunteers started maintaining the abandoned L&PS train corridor.

== History ==
The first passenger train reached Port Stanley on July 5, 1856. Use of the line increased until 1943, when the end of gas rationing and the increased use of automobiles caused a slow decline in passenger traffic. On February 1, 1957, passenger service ended on the L&PS line.

Afterwards, the railway continued to carry freight traffic, especially between St. Thomas and London, Ontario. The rail section between St. Thomas and Port Stanley fell into disrepair and was finally abandoned in 1982 after a washout. When the line was officially abandoned, a group of railway preservationists created the Port Stanley Terminal Rail Inc. and purchased the rail to be used as a heritage railway. After rebuilding the tracks, the group finally received a Provincial railway charter to operate trains between the cities of St. Thomas and Port Stanley in 1987. This was the first charter issued in Ontario in several decades.

== Recognition ==
In 2012, the Port Stanley Terminal Rail was inducted to the North America Railway Hall of Fame. The PSTR was recognized for its contribution to railroading as a "Community, Business, Government or Organization" in the "Local" category (pertaining specifically to the area in and around St. Thomas, Ontario.)

== Present day ==
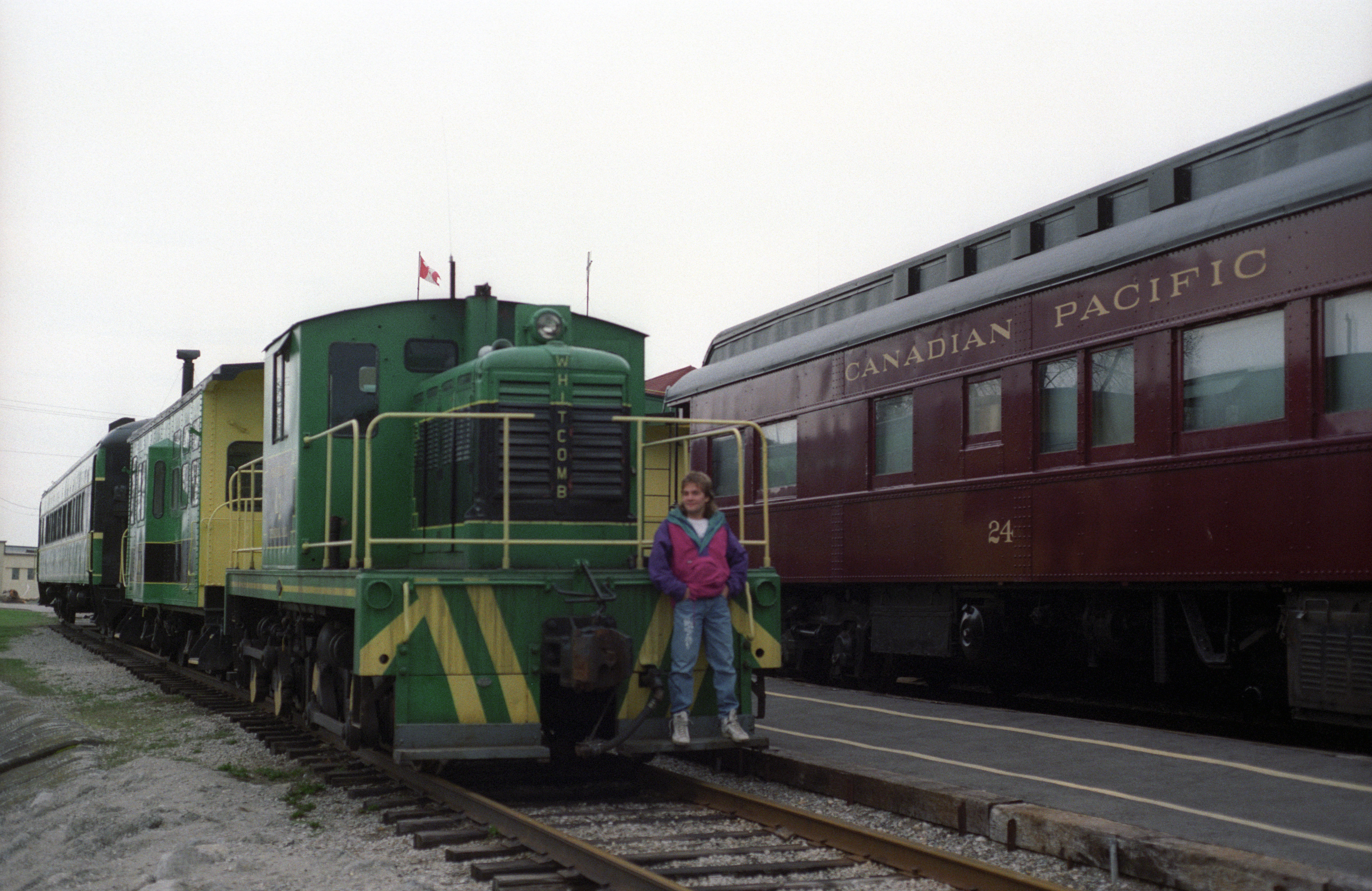
Port Stanley Terminal's CLC/Whitcomb diesel locomotive in 1992

Currently, the railway has five historic diesel electric locomotives from the 1940s and 1950s and nine passenger cars.:

- General Electric 25T locomotive - ex-Consolidated Sand and Gravel
- Canadian Locomotive Company/Whitcomb 50 ton switcher locomotive - ex-Consolidated Sand and Gravel
- General Electric 44T locomotive - ex-Greater Winnipeg Water District #103
- General Electric 45T locomotive - ext-Zalev Brothers Company
- Canadian Locomotive Company/Whitcomb 25 ton switcher locomotive - ex-Consolidated Sand and Gravel

Trains leave the Port Stanley railway station on most weekends (and daily during July and August except Monday and Tuesday) for an hour-long ride that ends up just south of St. Thomas in Whites. Additionally, a number of special train rides are scheduled throughout the year, like the Santa Express which runs in December and the Murder Mystery series. It runs seasonally as it doesn't run between mid-December and mid-April.

The PSTR railway is classified as a tourist railway with all passenger boarding done in Port Stanley.

The line is run and maintained through volunteer effort.

== See also ==
- List of heritage railways in Canada
- London and Port Stanley Railway
- North America Railway Hall of Fame
