= St. Thomas, Ontario =

St. Thomas
- City (single-tier)
- City of St. Thomas
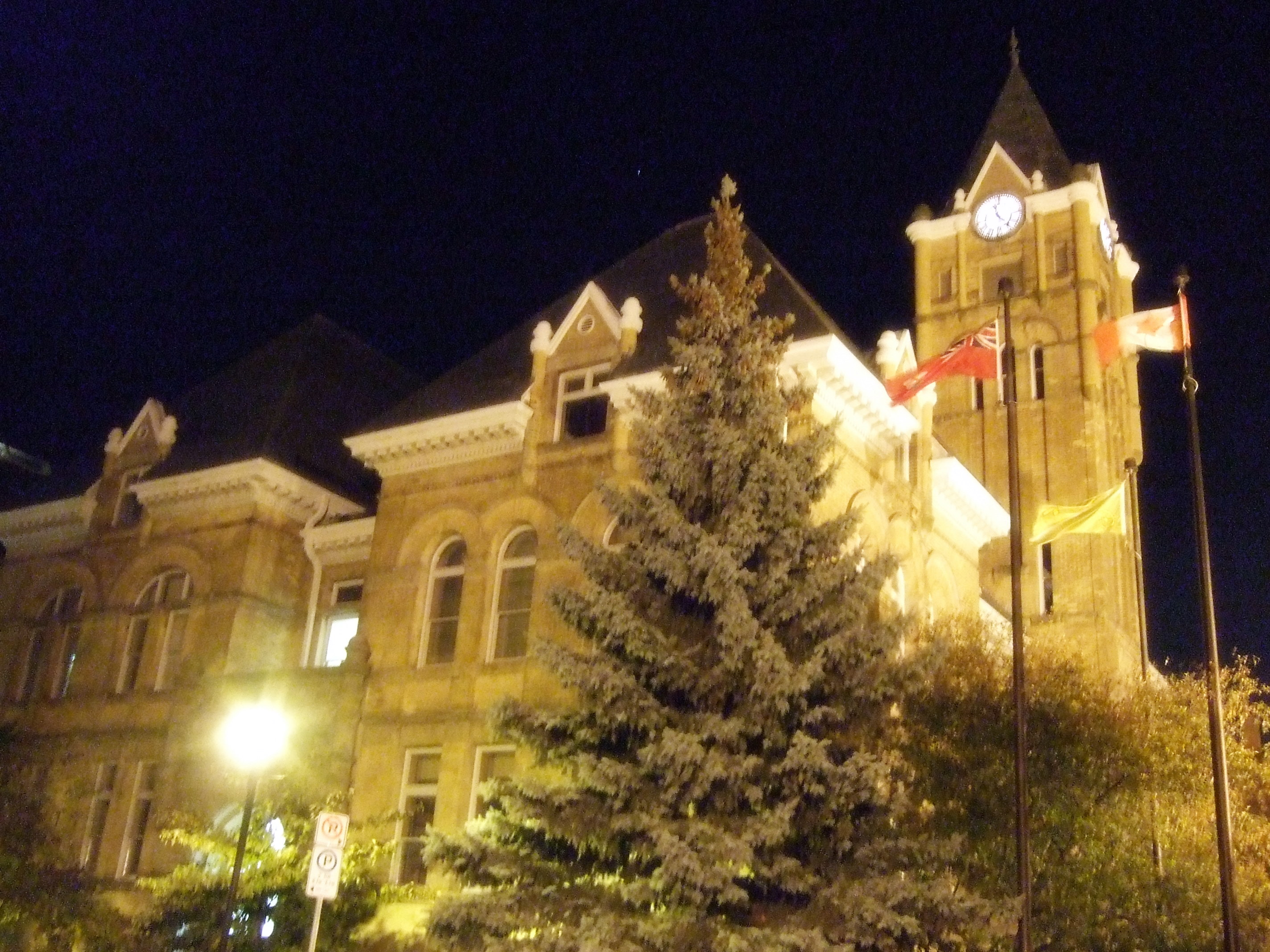
- St. Thomas City Hall

- Flag Seal

- Location of St. Thomas relative to Elgin County St. Thomas (Southern Ontario)
- Coordinates: 42°46.5′N 81°11′W
- Country: Canada
- Province: Ontario
- County: Elgin
- Settled: 1810
- Incorporated: 1852 (Village)
- 1861 (town); 1881 (city)

Government
  - Mayor: Jeff Kohler
  - Governing Body: St. Thomas City Council
  - MPs: Andrew Lawton (CPC)
  - MPPs: Rob Flack (OPC)

Area
  - Land: 35.52 km^{2} (13.71 sq mi)
- Elevation: 209.10 m (686.0 ft)

Population (2021)
  - City (single-tier): 42,918
  - Density: 1,067/km^{2} (2,760/sq mi)
  - Urban: 61,707
- Time zone: UTC-5 (EST)
  - Summer (DST): UTC-4 (EDT)
- Forward sortation area: N5P to N5R
- Area codes: 519, 226, and 548
- Highways: Highway 3 Highway 4
- Website: stthomas.ca

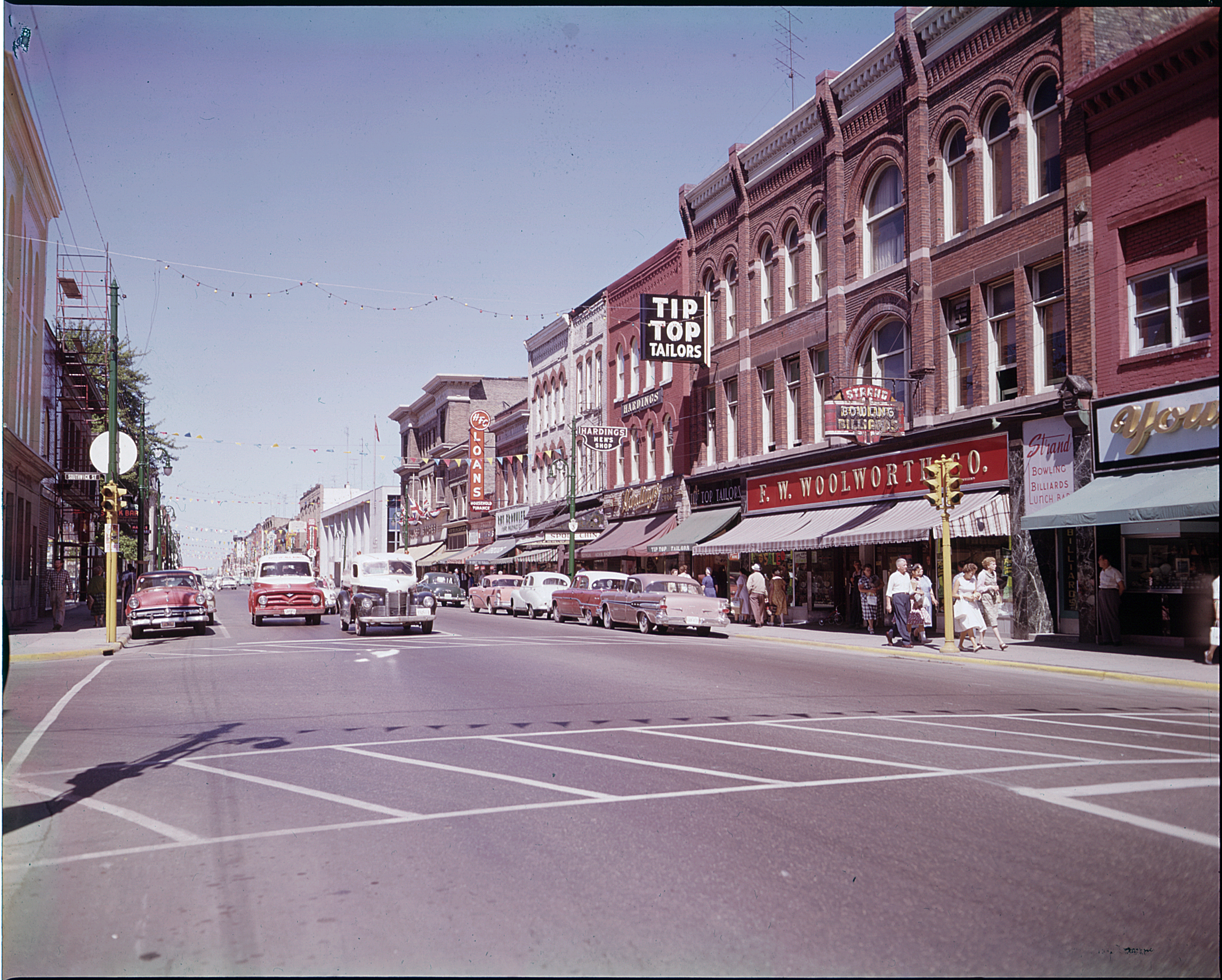
Street scene in St. Thomas, 1960

St. Thomas is a city in southwestern Ontario, Canada. It gained its city charter on March 4, 1881. The city is also the seat for Elgin County, although it is independent of the county.

At the time of the 2021 Census, the population of the city was 42,918.

== History ==
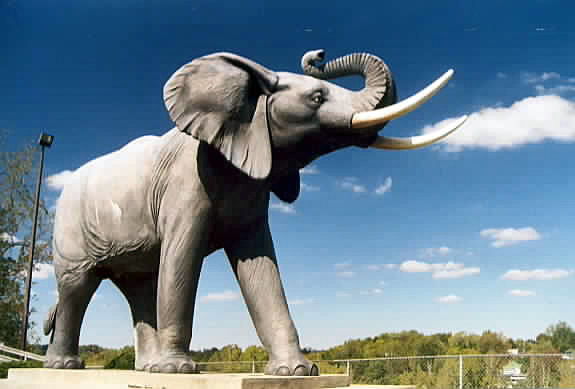
Life-sized Jumbo statue

The city, located at the intersection of two historical roads, was first settled in 1810. It was named the seat of the new Elgin County in 1844 and was incorporated as a village in 1852, then as a town in 1861. In 1881 St. Thomas became a city. It was named after Thomas Talbot who helped promote the development of this region during the early 19th century.

The founder of the settlement that became St. Thomas was Capt. Daniel Rapelje, descendant of a Walloon family settled in New Amsterdam, now New York City, at its inception in the seventeenth century. In 1820, Rapelje, the town's first settler, divided his land into town lots suitable for a village. Owner of the New England Mill, Rapelje subsequently donated two acres of land for the building of Old St. Thomas Church.

In 1871, the developing village of Millersburg, which included these lands east of the London and Port Stanley Railway, amalgamated with St. Thomas.

In the late 19th century and early 20th century, several railways were constructed through the city, and St. Thomas became an important railway junction. A total of 26 railways have passed through the city since the first railway was completed in 1856. In the 1950s and 1960s, with the decline of the railway as a mode of transportation, other industry began to locate in the city, principally primary and secondary automotive manufacturing.

Jumbo the circus elephant, said to be the world's biggest elephant at the time, died here on September 15, 1885, shortly after being hit by a locomotive. There is a life-sized commemorative statue that was erected in 1985.

In 1824, Charles Duncombe and John Rolph established the first medical school in Upper Canada, in St. Thomas, under the patronage of Colonel Thomas Talbot. Duncombe's house now forms part of The Elgin Military Museum complex. Between 1881 and 1988 the city had a private woman's school operating called Alma College which was destroyed by fire in 2008.

St. Thomas' late 19th- early 20th century architecture includes the Elgin County Court House, Wellington Street public school, Myrtle St. School (demolished in 2014), Balaclava St. School, Elmdale School and its city hall, most designated heritage properties and all designed by former resident Neil R. Darrach.

== Government ==
Jeff Kohler is the current mayor of St. Thomas, having been re-elected as mayor on October 26, 2026. He previously served as mayor of the city from 2003-2006. The City Council consists of the mayor and eight City Councillors, all elected at large, meaning Councillors are elected on a citywide basis.

== Military ==
31 Combat Engineer Regiment (The Elgins) was created in 1997 when the former Elgin Regiment (RCAC) was re-roled from an armour tasking. The regiment had been associated with St. Thomas since its creation; St. Thomas is currently home to one of its two component field squadrons. St. Thomas Armoury is a recognized Federal Heritage building 1992 on the Register of the Government of Canada Heritage Buildings.

== Demographics ==
Historical population
Year	Pop.	±%
1991	30,332	—
1996	32,275	+6.4%
2001	33,236	+3.0%
2006	36,110	+8.6%
2011	37,905	+5.0%
2016	38,909	+2.6%
2021	42,918	+10.3%
1996 population would have been 31,407 with 2001 boundaries 2001 population would have been 33,303 with 2006 boundaries.

In the 2021 Census of Population conducted by Statistics Canada, St. Thomas had a population of 42,840 living in 18,062 of its 18,596 total private dwellings, a change of 10.1% from its 2016 population of 38,909. With a land area of 35.61 km^{2} (13.75 sq mi), it had a population density of 1,190/km^{2} (3,082/sq mi) in 2021.

According to the 2011 census, St. Thomas had a population of 37,905 people in 2011, which was an increase of 5.6% from the 2006 census count. The median household income in 2016 for St. Thomas was $71,356.75.

In the 2016 Census, more than 10,000 people were age 60 or over.

== Education ==
Fanshawe College has a satellite campus in St. Thomas. Catholic schools are controlled by the London District Catholic School Board and public schools are controlled by the Thames Valley District School Board. Arthur Voaden Secondary School, Central Elgin Collegiate Institute and Parkside Collegiate Institute are the three public high schools. St. Joseph's High School is a Catholic high school. There are two independent Christian elementary schools, Kings Academy and St. Thomas Community Christian School.

== Economy ==
The local economy has been dominated by automotive manufacturing, with two plants operated by Magna International, the Ford St. Thomas Assembly in nearby Talbotville, and a Sterling Trucks assembly plant. However, the 2008 global recession that impacted the auto sector ultimately trickled down to the city; the Sterling plant closed in March 2009, and the Ford plant closed in late 2011 for a loss of 1,400 jobs. A number of other, smaller auto parts plants also closed as a result, putting thousands more out of work. This had a domino effect on the other part manufacturers in town, such as Lear Seating. One automotive materials supplier, A. Schulman, had previously closed its local manufacturing plant in 2008, one of the first actions of a new CEO installed in January.

Masco Canada's consolidation of their Canadian operations into the former Sterling Truck assembly plant in 2010 and Toyota supplier Takumi Stamping Canada's expansion in the same year brought over 500 jobs to St. Thomas.

A report in June 2019 indicated that a plant for cross-laminated timber (CLT) would be built in town, providing over 60 jobs. The estimated cost of the automated plant was $32 million.

The town's Economic Development Corporation has attracted film crews, particularly to the former psychiatric hospital (the Regional Mental Health Centre) on Sunset Drive as a location for filming. A January 2020 report indicated that productions filming in the town have included The Boys, Guillermo del Toro's Scary Stories to Tell in the Dark and most recently, a film featuring Jason Momoa that was planning to film in town, frequently outdoors, from February to June 2020.

In April 2023, an announcement was made for the building of a battery plant by PowerCo, a subsidiary of Volkswagen AG and to have it running by 2027. This plant is expected to employ 3,000 and be one of the largest VW plants in the world.

== Transportation ==
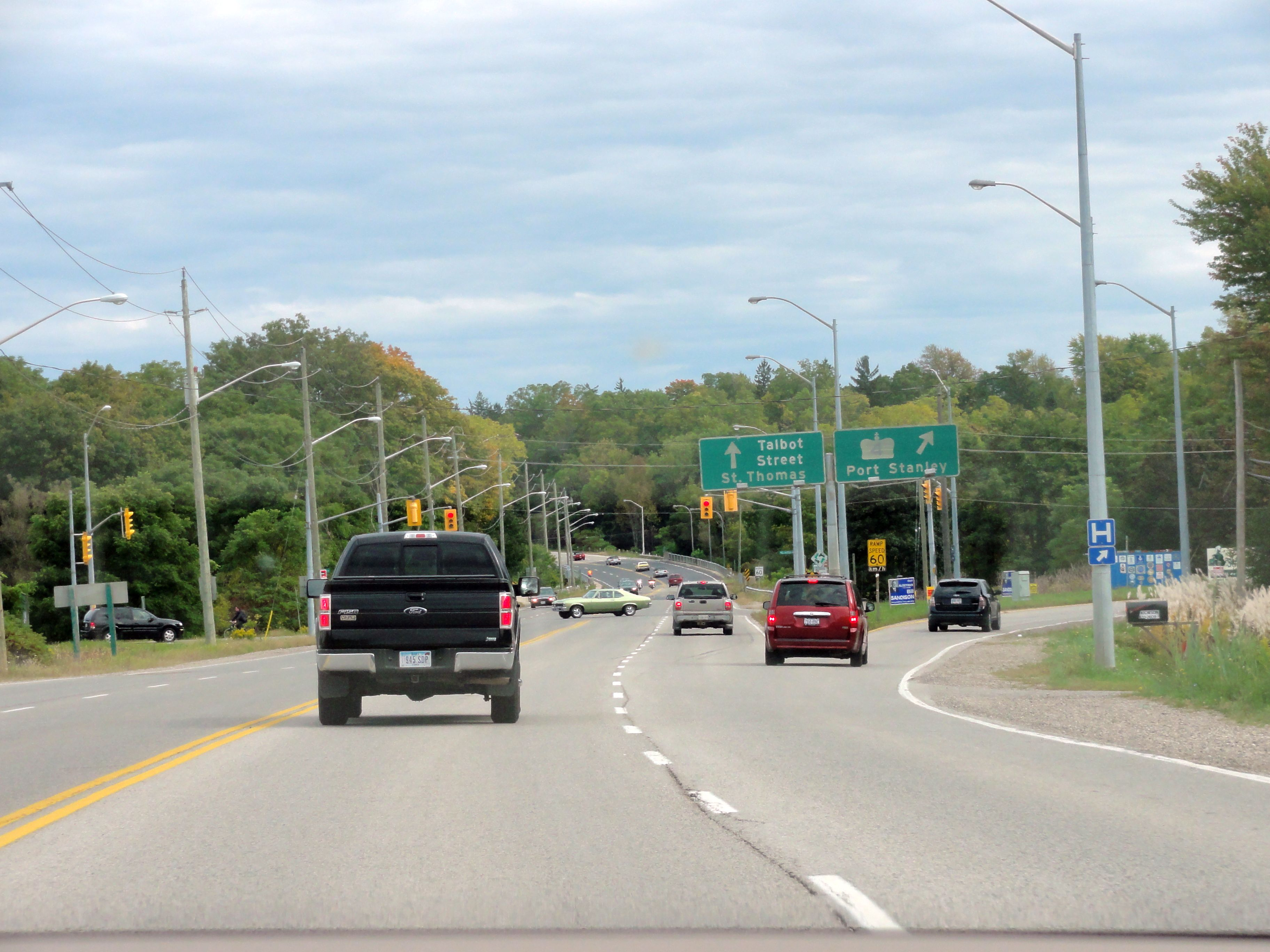
The Highway 4 / Talbot Street (now renamed Talbot Hill) junction, before it was reconstructed into a roundabout.

St. Thomas is accessible via Ontario Highway 3 and Ontario Highway 4, the latter of which provides access to London, Highway 401 and Highway 402.

Local Motion - Railway City Transit, which includes both conventional bus service and paratransit, is owned by the city and staffed and operated by Voyageur Transportation.

The city is served by the St. Thomas Municipal Airport (YQS), just east in the Municipality of Central Elgin. There are no scheduled flights; the airport is used for general aviation only. A bi-annual large-scale air show takes place at the St. Thomas Municipal Airport.

From 1978 to 1979 Canada Southern Railway Station served as the only Canadian stop for the short-lived Amtrak Niagara Rainbow route.

== Media ==
St. Thomas has several media outlets based in the city. The St. Thomas Times-Journal is the city's newspaper, owned by Sun Media (Quebecor). The St. Thomas - Elgin Weekly News is a weekly newspaper published in St. Thomas, that is distributed for free to all residents of St. Thomas and Elgin County. The Elgin County Market is a weekly publication that is also distributed for free to all residents of St. Thomas and Elgin County, it features various local business flyers and advertisements.

Rogers Cable operates a local community channel consisting mostly of local and dedicated volunteers. CFPL-DT, branded as CTV Two London, covers many news stories from St. Thomas.

St. Thomas's only local commercial radio station, CKZM-FM 94.1 FM, was launched on May 20, 2011. Also a low-power FM radio station — VF8016, 90.1 MHz — broadcasts religious activities from Faith Baptist Church of St. Thomas. CFHK-FM, branded as 103.1 Fresh FM, is also licensed to St. Thomas, although its programming originates from London and targets all of southwestern Ontario.

Establish Media is the newest media outlet based in St. Thomas. They produce digital content which they distribute primarily through social channels.

== Sports ==
There is a dragway called St. Thomas Raceway Park. The dragway is located a reasonable distance away from the town and minutes east of the historical community of Sparta.

=== Current franchises ===
Active sports teams in St. Thomas
Club	League	Sport	Venue	Established	Championships
St. Thomas Stars	GOJHL	Ice hockey	Joe Thornton Community Centre	1961	1
St. Thomas Tomcats	JIBL	Baseball	Emslie Field	1950	N/A
Railway City FC	League2 Ontario	Soccer	1Password Park	2025	0

=== Former franchises ===
Former sports teams in St. Thomas
Club	League	Sport	Venue	Established	Moved/Folded	Championships
St. Thomas Wildcats	UHL	Ice hockey	Memorial Arena	1991	1994	0
St. Thomas Elgins	IBL	Baseball	Emslie Field	1948	1996	5
St. Thomas Storm	IBL	Baseball	Emslie Field	2000	2004	0

== Climate ==
St. Thomas has a humid continental climate (Köppen Dfa/Dfb), with warm to hot summers and cold, snowy winters.

Climate data for St. Thomas, Ontario (1981−2010)
Month	Jan	Feb	Mar	Apr	May	Jun	Jul	Aug	Sep	Oct	Nov	Dec	Year
Record high °C (°F)	14.5 (58.1)	18.5 (65.3)	24.5 (76.1)	29.5 (85.1)	32.5 (90.5)	38.0 (100.4)	37.0 (98.6)	34.5 (94.1)	33.0 (91.4)	26.5 (79.7)	21.5 (70.7)	18.5 (65.3)	38.0 (100.4)
Mean daily maximum °C (°F)	−0.8 (30.6)	0.7 (33.3)	5.6 (42.1)	13.0 (55.4)	19.6 (67.3)	24.7 (76.5)	27.0 (80.6)	25.9 (78.6)	21.8 (71.2)	15.1 (59.2)	8.3 (46.9)	2.0 (35.6)	13.6 (56.5)
Daily mean °C (°F)	−4.7 (23.5)	−3.6 (25.5)	1.0 (33.8)	7.6 (45.7)	13.7 (56.7)	18.8 (65.8)	21.2 (70.2)	20.3 (68.5)	16.4 (61.5)	10.1 (50.2)	4.5 (40.1)	−1.4 (29.5)	8.7 (47.7)
Mean daily minimum °C (°F)	−8.5 (16.7)	−7.8 (18.0)	−3.7 (25.3)	2.1 (35.8)	7.7 (45.9)	12.9 (55.2)	15.4 (59.7)	14.7 (58.5)	10.9 (51.6)	5.1 (41.2)	0.6 (33.1)	−4.8 (23.4)	3.7 (38.7)
Record low °C (°F)	−31 (−24)	−30 (−22)	−25.5 (−13.9)	−16 (3)	−3 (27)	1.0 (33.8)	6.0 (42.8)	0.0 (32.0)	−2 (28)	−7 (19)	−13.5 (7.7)	−27.5 (−17.5)	−31 (−24)
Average precipitation mm (inches)	73.5 (2.89)	63.2 (2.49)	65.7 (2.59)	83.4 (3.28)	87.3 (3.44)	92.4 (3.64)	83.0 (3.27)	80.0 (3.15)	94.8 (3.73)	85.7 (3.37)	98.7 (3.89)	85.3 (3.36)	993.0 (39.09)
Average rainfall mm (inches)	35.2 (1.39)	37.3 (1.47)	48.5 (1.91)	79.9 (3.15)	87.3 (3.44)	92.4 (3.64)	83.0 (3.27)	80.0 (3.15)	94.8 (3.73)	85.4 (3.36)	92.4 (3.64)	58.1 (2.29)	874.4 (34.43)
Average snowfall cm (inches)	38.3 (15.1)	25.9 (10.2)	17.1 (6.7)	3.5 (1.4)	0.0 (0.0)	0.0 (0.0)	0.0 (0.0)	0.0 (0.0)	0.0 (0.0)	0.3 (0.1)	6.3 (2.5)	27.3 (10.7)	118.6 (46.7)
Average precipitation days (≥ 0.2 mm)	14.7	11.4	12.1	15.2	14.1	11.1	12.4	11.1	13.2	13.9	15.3	14.5	159.0
Average rainy days (≥ 0.2 mm)	6.0	5.7	9.1	14.3	14.1	11.1	12.4	11.1	13.2	13.9	13.5	8.5	132.9
Average snowy days (≥ 0.2 cm)	9.6	7.0	4.2	1.3	0.0	0.0	0.0	0.0	0.0	0.15	2.3	7.3	31.8
Source: Environment Canada

== Parks ==
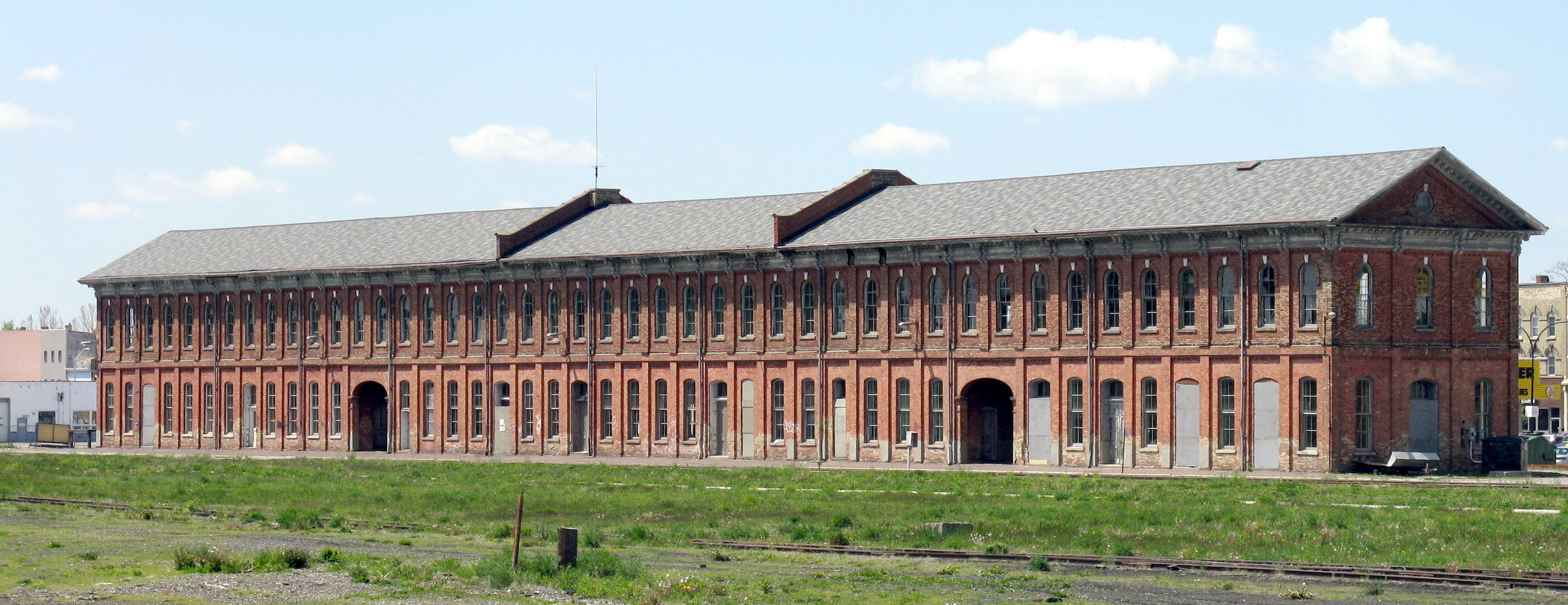
St. Thomas railway station, built between 1871 and 1873, was the headquarters of the Canada Southern Railway. It is currently being restored.

There are two major parks in the city: Pinafore Park in the south, beside Pinafore Lake; and Waterworks Park in the north, which is straddled by Kettle Creek and the Waterworks Reservoir nearby.

The Trans Canada Trail goes through St. Thomas, with a pavilion located in Jonas Street Park.

The Lions Club Dog Park is located at the far west end of main street, at 25 Talbot Road. The park is managed by the St. Thomas Dog Owners Association (STDOA) in partnership with the City of St. Thomas. The park is open from dawn to dusk, daily.

The Kettle Creek Dog Park, opened in July 2014, is located just north of St Thomas, off Highbury on Mapleton Line, 200 metres beyond Dan Paterson Conservation Area. The park is open daily from dawn to dusk and boasts a large fenced in park, a fenced-in area for small dogs and a separate fenced-in area for one-on-one play. The park is managed by Kettle Creek Conservation Authority in partnership with STDOA, the Municipality of Central Elgin and the City of St Thomas.

V.A. Barrie Park, located on Sunset Drive, and Waterworks Park include popular Disc Golf courses.

== Cultural activities ==
The Elgin Military Museum is located in the west end of St. Thomas. While the museum recounts the stories of Elgin County residents from the War of 1812 to Afghanistan, it also includes two M113 Armoured Personnel Carriers and a collection of some 600 UN and NATO badges described by one appraiser as "the best collection I have seen outside of the UN in New York". In late 2009, The Elgin Military Museum began the process to acquire the Cold War Oberon Class Submarine HMCS Ojibwa, The submarine is currently stationed outside of St. Thomas in Port Burwell.

The Elgin County Railway Museum is located in central St. Thomas.

St. Thomas is also home to the North America Railway Hall of Fame, which is located in the CASO train station. The station was built between 1871-1873 and was a centre of travel between New York City and Chicago. It is located on Talbot Street downtown.

The Elgin Theatre Guild is located at 40 Princess Avenue, and is home to a thriving community theatre, as well as hosting small musical groups. The building is a former church, built in 1907 by architect Neil Darrach. On December 3, 2001, a by-law was passed by St. Thomas City Council designating 40 Princess Avenue as a building of historic and architectural value in the City of St. Thomas.

St. Thomas is home to the Railway City Brewing Company, one of 29 members of the Ontario Craft Brewers.

St. Thomas' sister city is Bowling Green, Ohio.

== Heritage buildings ==
As a county seat and major railway junction, St. Thomas was an important town in early Ontario. As such, the city has a significant number of pre-1914 heritage buildings.

=== Public ===
- St. Thomas Town Hall, 1899 (545 Talbot St.)
- Elgin County Courthouse, 1898 (4 Wellington St.)
- St. Thomas Carnegie Library, 1904 (9 Mondamin St.)
- Elgin County Registry Office, 1874 (Gladstone Ave.)
- St. Thomas Armoury, 1901 (40 Wilson Ave.)
- Public Utilities Commission Building, 1916 (36 St. Catherine St.)

=== Religious ===
- St. Thomas Anglican, 1823 (55 Walnut St)
- Trinity Anglican, 1877 (55 Southwick St.)
- St. John's Anglican, 1909 (20 Flora St.)
- Knox Presbyterian, 1883 (55 Hincks St.)
- Alma Street Presbyterian, 1891 (94 Kains St.)
- Central Methodist, 1897 (135 Wellington St.)
- Holy Angels Roman Catholic, 1911 (502 Talbot Street)
- Centre Street Baptist, 1879 (28 Southwick St.)
- Church of Christ, 1906 (40 Princess Ave.)

=== Education ===
- Wellington Street Public School, 1898 (50 Wellington St.)
- Balaclava Street School, 1898 (20 Balaclava St.)
- Arthur Voaden Vocational School, 1925 (41 Flora St.)

=== Transportation ===
- St. Thomas Station (Canada Southern Ry.), 1871 (750 Talbot St.)

=== Lost heritage ===
- Alma College, 1881 (96 Moore St.) – burned down 2008
- Myrtle Street School, 1903 (43 Myrtle St.) – demolished 2014
- Amasa Wood Hospital, 1891 (45 Pearl St.)– demolished 1953
- St. Thomas Collegiate Institute, 1902 (35 Elysian St.) – demolished 1967
- First Methodist, 1873 (26 St George St.) – burned down 1946
- St. Thomas Post Office, 1883 (403 Talbot St.)– demolished 1958

== Notable people ==
- Lexie Adzija, professional women's ice hockey player (Seattle Torrent)
- Emily Austin, writer
- Blake Ball, professional hockey player, professional wrestler, actor
- Gopal Bhatnagar, cardiac surgeon, entrepreneur and public health advocate
- Mary Ann Cunningham (1841–1930), social reformer and temperance activist
- Bob Emslie, (1859–1943) pitcher in Major League Baseball who also had a long career as an umpire
- Cory Emmerton, professional ice hockey player (Detroit Red Wings, Grand Rapids Griffins, Kingston Frontenacs)
- Jean Chamberlain Froese, obstetrician
- Elaine Goble (born 1956), Canadian visual artist
- Jack Graney, professional baseball player and broadcaster, namesake of the Jack Graney Award
- Paul Hackman (1953–1992), guitarist and songwriter from the rock band Helix
- Libby Hague, artist
- Dell Henderson, Hollywood actor of 304 films, director of 208 films and writer of 35
- Mitchell Hepburn (1896–1953), Premier of Ontario 1934–1942
- Dave Hudson, former professional ice hockey player (New York Islanders, Kansas City Scouts, Colorado Rockies)
- D. J. Kennington, NASCAR driver
- Rachel McAdams, Oscar-nominated Hollywood actress
- Greg McKegg, professional ice hockey player for the Boston Bruins
- Stephen Ouimette, actor, director widely known for his work at the Stratford Festival
- Stephen J. Peters, politician, MPP for Elgin—Middlesex—London, former Minister of Labour (Ontario) and Minister of Agriculture and Food (Ontario), Speaker of the Ontario Legislature 2007–2011.
- Philip Francis Pocock, former Catholic archbishop of Toronto
- Janet and Greta Podleski, bestselling cookbook authors (Looneyspoons, Crazy Plates, Eat, Shrink & Be Merry!), Food Network hosts and Reader's Digest columnists
- Joe Preston, entrepreneur and member of parliament representing Elgin—Middlesex—London riding
- Helen Shaver, actress, director, producer (The Amityville Horror, The Color of Money, Judging Amy)
- Ned Sparks, (1883–1957) character actor, well known for his deadpan expression and deep gravelly voice
- David Shaw, former professional ice hockey player
- Kenneth J. Summers, commander of Operation Friction
- Joe Thornton, professional ice hockey player (Florida Panthers, Toronto Maple Leafs, San Jose Sharks, Boston Bruins, Sault Ste. Marie Greyhounds, St. Thomas Stars)
- Sadie Waite, professional soccer player (Ottawa Rapid FC)
- Aaron Walpole, third-place finisher in the third season of Canadian Idol
- Kari-Lynn Winters, children's book author, dramatist, literacy educator
- John Wise (Ontario), PC (1935–2013), dairy cattle farmer and Federal Minister of Agriculture
- Marline Yan (1993-), actress and singer

== See also ==
- Coat of arms of St. Thomas, Ontario
- Port Stanley Terminal Rail
