= Pettibone =

Pettibone may refer to:

== People with the surname ==
- Alfred Pettibone, businessman and Washington state pioneer
- A. H. Pettibone, American politician
- Charles Pettibone (1841–1925), American newspaper editor
- Claire Pettibone, American fashion designer
- Doug Pettibone, American musician
- George Pettibone, American radical labor activist
- Jay Pettibone, American baseball player
- Jerry Pettibone, American football coach
- John Pettibone, American vocalist
- John Owen Pettibone, American politician
- Jonathan Pettibone, American baseball player
- Marian H. Pettibone, American biologist and curator
- Milton C. Pettibone, mayor of Flint, Michigan (1897–1898)
- Rufus Pettibone (1784–1825), justice of the Supreme Court of Missouri
- Shep Pettibone, record producer and DJ

== Places in the United States ==
- Pettibone, North Dakota
- Pettibone, Texas
- Pettibone Farm, Lanesborough, Massachusetts
- Pettibone Park (La Crosse), Wisconsin

== Other uses ==
- Pettibone (company)

== See also ==
- Senator Pettibone (disambiguation)
