= Class 62 =

Class 62 may refer to:

- Belgian Railways Class 62 - a class of diesel locomotives
- DRG Class 62 - a class of German 4-6-4T locomotives
- JNR Class C62 - a class of Japanese 4-6-4 locomotives
- JNR Class D62 - a class of Japanese 2-8-4 locomotives
- JŽ class 62 - a class of Yugoslavian 0-6-0T locomotives, ex-USATC S100 with extra Yugoslav-built examples.
- NSB Class 62 - a class of Norwegian electric railcars
