= Niagara Railway Museum =

Railway museum in Fort Erie, Ontario

- Former name: Niagara Falls Railway Museum (1997–2010)
- Established: 1997; 29 years ago March 2010; 16 years ago (current location)
- Location: 21 Warren Street, Fort Erie, Ontario, Canada
- Coordinates: 42.926623°N 78.923622°W
- Type: Railway museum
- Founder: Ken S. Jones
- Website: https://nfrm.ca

The Niagara Railway Museum (formerly the Niagara Falls Railway Museum) is a railway museum located in Fort Erie, Ontario. Founded in 1997, it was created to help preserve and promote the railway history of the Niagara region.

== History ==
The museum's collection initially began in 1994, and was made up of various photographs and railway paperwork. In August 1996, they purchased their first rail vehicle, an ex-Canadian Pacific Railway track motorcar. The museum itself was founded by Ken S. Jones in 1997, as the Niagara Falls Railway Museum.

In 2001, Canadian Pacific donated three of their heritage 40 foot long boxcars to the museum, which were sent to Welland in December, before being put in storage at Brookfield Siding in the CP' Fort Erie subdivision a few months later, eventually arriving to the museum in October 2003. In 2006, the museum acquired their first steam locomotive, HEPC #46, which had been used to construct the Sir Adam Beck Hydroelectric Generating Station in the early 1920s and was the last surviving locomotive from the station's construction.

In March 2010, the museum relocated to the Canadian National Railway's former diesel workshop in Fort Erie, which had been built in the early 1950s, and was at one point one of the busiest industrial yards in Canada, before being decommissioned in 1989. On top of restoring the workshop, museum members also relayed track outside the workshop, which had been removed after its decommissioning.

In July 2023, two ex-JŽ class 62 locomotives were donated to the museum by Marineland, which had originally been acquired from Yugoslav Railways in 1981 by the park's founder John Holer for a proposed train ride at the park, making it one of only two places in Ontario with at least four steam locomotives, along with the Canada Science and Technology Museum in Ottawa.

== Collection ==
=== Locomotives ===
Number & name	Type	Builder	Built	Status	Notes
46 (48)	0-4-0ST	Cooke Locomotive and Machine Works	September 1920	Under cosmetic restoration	Built to help with the construction of the Sir Adam Beck Hydroelectric Generating Station.
	0-4-0F	H.K. Porter, Inc.	July 1943	On static display	Fireless locomotive.
62-118	JŽ Class 62 0-6-0T	Đuro Đaković	1955	On static display	Originally purchased by Marineland from Yugoslav Railways in 1981, donated to the museum in July 2023.
62-129	JŽ Class 62 0-6-0T	Đuro Đaković	1955	On static display	Originally purchased by Marineland from Yugoslav Railways in 1981, donated to the museum in July 2023.
	GE 25-ton switcher 4wPM	GE Transportation	January 1948	Operational	Built for Iroquois Construction.
11	GE 50-ton switcher Bo-Bo	GE Transportation	September 1954	Operational	Built for National Steel Car.
E-7 (102)	50-ton electric Bo-Bo	National Steel Car and Westinghouse Electric Corporation	1919	Under cosmetic restoration	Built for the Hydro-Electric Power Commission of Ontario.
	MDT 40-ton switcher 4wPM	Plymouth Locomotive Works	March 1953	Under restoration	Built for the Hydro-Electric Power Commission of Ontario in Niagara Falls. Donated to the museum by Babcock & Wilcox in 2007.
6	6-ton 4wPM	Vulcan Iron Works	April 1937	On display	2 ft gauge locomotive, built for Inco's operations in Port Colborne. Privately owned, used for parts.
8	6-ton 4wPM	Vulcan Iron Works	1945	Under restoration	2 ft gauge locomotive, built for Inco's operations in Port Colborne. Privately owned.

=== Rolling stock ===
Number & name	Type	Builder	Built	Original railway	Status	Notes
X-759 (3775)	Carpenters Boarding Car	National Steel Car	1913	Toronto, Hamilton and Buffalo Railway	Under restoration	
401258 (50721)	40ft steel boxcar	Canadian Car and Foundry	September 1956	Canadian Pacific Railway	Artifact display car	
401639 (57600)	40ft steel boxcar	National Steel Car	May 1960	Canadian Pacific Railway	Workshop and storage car	
57974	40ft steel boxcar	National Steel Car	June 1960	Canadian Pacific Railway	Display and store car	
2676	Gondola	National Steel Car	February 1966	Toronto, Hamilton and Buffalo Railway	Under cosmetic restoration	
56323	Caboose	Canadian National Railway	1935	Canadian National Railway	Under restoration	
56452	Snow flanger	Grand Trunk Railway	December 1923	Grand Trunk Railway	Awaiting restoration	Frames and bogies only
	Ingot car				On display	2 ft 6 in gauge car

=== Motorcars ===
Number & name	Type	Builder	Built	Original railway	Status	Notes
	21E	Sylvester Steel Products		Canadian National Railway	Under restoration	Privately owned.
187-49	A-4D	Fairmont Railway Motors	August 1981	Canadian National Railway	In storage, out of service	
191-55	A-4D	Fairmont Railway Motors		Canadian National Railway	In storage, parts only	
	A-4D	Fairmont Railway Motors		Canadian National Railway	In storage, parts only	
189-34	A-4D	Fairmont Railway Motors		Canadian National Railway	On display, under restoration	
2700-19	CBI	Woodings Railcar Limited	1985	Canadian Pacific Railway	On display	Privately owned
1702 77	CR-7A	Fairmont Railway Motors		Toronto, Hamilton and Buffalo Railway	In storage	Privately owned
"Dale"	M14	Fairmont Railway Motors	1940s	Chesapeake and Ohio Railway	On display	
	M19	Fairmont Railway Motors	1950s	Canadian National Railway	In service, on display	
1701 63	M19	Fairmont Railway Motors		Toronto, Hamilton and Buffalo Railway	In storage	Privately owned
	M9g	Fairmont Railway Motors	1950s	Canadian National Railway	On display	Privately owned

=== Maintenance of way vehicles ===
Number & name	Type	Builder	Built	Original railway	Status	Notes
	Crane	Bert Pyke Ltd		Canadian Pacific Railway	Out of service, stored	Privately owned.
	Gang trailer	Fairmont Railway Motors		Canadian National Railway	Under restoration	
MOW 01	Heavy steel lorie	Railcar Canada	1980s	Canadian National Railway	In service, stored	
	Hi Rail truck	GMC	1987	Norfolk Southern Railway (ex-Trillium Railway)	Operational	
MOW 02	Metal lorie	Sylvester Manufacturing Company	1980s	Canadian National Railway	In service, stored	
MOW 03	Metal lorie	Railcar Canada	1980s	Canadian National Railway	In service, stored	
	Passenger trailer	Fairmont Railway Motors			In service	
	Single stone grinder	Nordberg Manufacturing Company	1939	Canadian National Railway	Operational, on display	Privately owned.
MOW 4	Wood lorie	Fairmont Railway Motors	1960s	Canadian National Railway	Under restoration	

=== Other exbibits ===
- 2TMA Trackmobile, built in 1970 by the Whiting Corporation in Harvey, Illinois for Kennecott Utah Copper. Operational.
- Motive Power Tractor #456, built by Pettibone and Mercury Truck & Tractor Company for the Canadian National Railway. Out of service, on display.
- The cab of GMD F7 #9173
