= USATC S100 Class =

Class of American steam locomotive

USATC S100 class
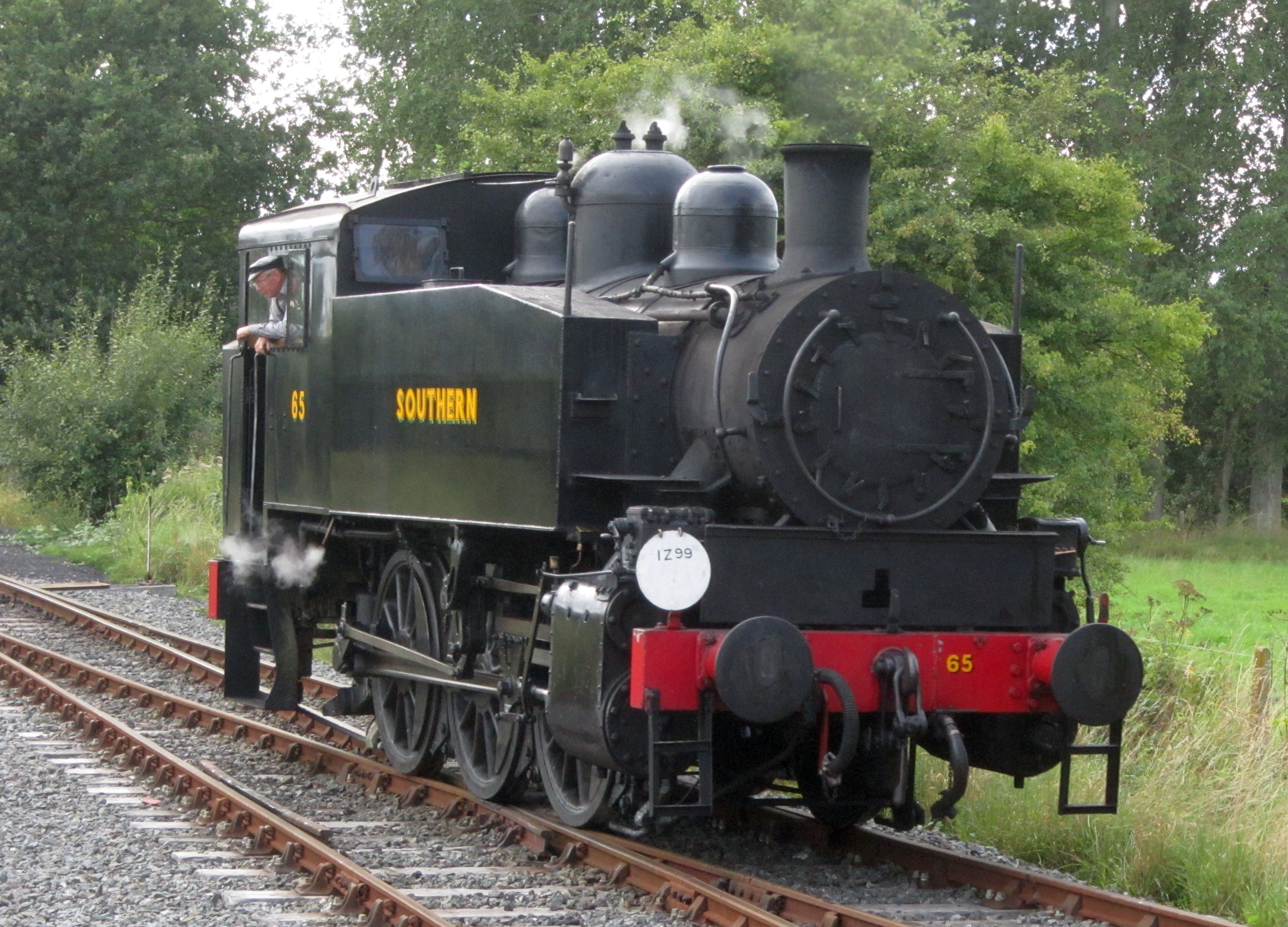
- Former Southern Railway USA class No. 65 preserved at the Kent and East Sussex Railway
Type and origin
- Power type: Steam
- Designer: Howard G. Hill
- Builder: Davenport Locomotive Works (109), H. K. Porter, Inc (150), Vulcan Iron Works (123)
- Build date: 1942–1944
- Total produced: 382
Specifications
- Configuration
  - Whyte: 0-6-0T
  - UIC: C nt
- Gauge: 4 ft 8 1/2 in (1,435 mm) standard gauge
- Driver dia.: 4 ft 6 in (1,372 mm)
- Minimum curve: 150 ft (45.72 m) radius
- Length: 29 ft 6 in (8.99 m)
- Width: 9 ft 0 in (2.74 m)
- Height: 12 ft 1 5/8 in (3.70 m)
- Loco weight: 100,650 lb (45,654 kilograms)
- Fuel type: Coal or Oil
- Fuel capacity: 2,500 lb (1,130 kilograms) coal, or 300 US gallons (1,100 L; 250 imp gal) oil
- Water cap.: 1,200 US gallons (4,500 L; 1,000 imp gal)
- Firebox
  - Grate area: First 50: 19.4 sq ft (1.80 m^{2}), Remainder: 18.3 sq ft (1.70 m^{2})
- Boiler pressure: 210 lbf/in^{2} (1.45 MPa)
- Heating surface
  - Firebox: 86 sq ft (8.0 m^{2})
  - Tubes: 790 sq ft (73 m^{2})
  - Total surface: 876 sq ft (81.4 m^{2})
- Superheater: None
- Cylinders: Two, outside
- Cylinder size: 16.5 in × 24 in (419 mm × 610 mm)
- Valve gear: Outside Walschaerts
- Valve type: 8-inch (203 mm) piston valves
Performance figures
- Tractive effort: 21,630 lbf (96.2 kN)
- Factor of adh.: 4.65
Career
- Operators: USATC, railways and industries of various countries around the world
- Disposition: At least 27 known preserved, possibly more in derelict condition, remainder scrapped

The United States Army Transportation Corps (USATC) S100 Class is a 0-6-0T "Switcher" type steam locomotive that was designed for switching (shunting) duties in Europe and North Africa during World War II. After the war, they were used on railways in Austria, China, Egypt, France, Great Britain, Greece, Iran, Iraq, Israel, Italy, Jamaica, the Netherlands, Palestine, Mexico, the United States, and Yugoslavia.

== Wartime development and use ==
The S100 is a side tank designed by Col. Howard G. Hill. In 1942, the USATC ordered 382 S100s from Davenport Locomotive Works of Iowa, H. K. Porter, Inc, of Pittsburgh and Vulcan Iron Works of Wilkes-Barre. They were shipped to the British War Department in 1943. They were stored in Britain until 1944. After D-Day, most went overseas but some remained in store.

== Construction ==
Builders	Construction numbers	Years	Quantity	USATC numbers
H. K. Porter,	7408 – 7422	1942	15	USATC 1252 – USATC 1266
Vulcan Iron Works	4365 – 4384	1942	20	USATC 1267 – USATC 1286
Davenport Locomotive Works	2417 – 2431	1942	15	USATC 1287 – USATC 1301
Davenport Locomotive Works	2473 – 2487	1943	15	USATC 1302 – USATC 1316
H. K. Porter	7501 – 7512	1942	12	USATC 1387 – USATC 1398
H. K. Porter	7513 – 7550	1943	38	USATC 1399 – USATC 1436
Davenport Locomotive Works	2492 – 2516	1943	25	USATC 1927 – USATC 1951
Vulcan Iron Works	4425 – 4474	1943	50	USATC 1952 – USATC 2001
Vulcan Iron Works	4475 – 4503	1943	29	USATC 4313 – USATC 4341
Davenport Locomotive Works	2521 – 2550	1943	30	USATC 4372 – USATC 4401
H. K. Porter	7460 – 7468	1942	9	USATC 5000 – USATC 5008
H. K. Porter	7483 – 7489	1942	7	USATC 5009 – USATC 5015
H. K. Porter	7490 – 7501	1943	12	USATC 5016 – USATC 5027
H. K. Porter	7571 – 7600	1943	30	USATC 5028 – USATC 5057
H. K. Porter	7616 – 7618	1943	3	USATC 5058 – USATC 5060
Davenport Locomotive Works	2589 – 2591	1943	3	USATC 6000 – USATC 6002
Davenport Locomotive Works	2592 – 2612	1944	21	USATC 6003 – USATC 6023
H. K. Porter	7660 – 7683	1944	24	USATC 6080 – USATC 6103
Vulcan Iron Works	4530 – 4553	1944	24	USATC 6160 – USATC 6183

== Use after the Second World War ==
After the Second World War, SNCF bought 77 S100s and designated them class 030TU. Jugoslovenske železnice (Yugoslav State Railways) bought many S100s and designated them class 62. In the 1950s JŽ assembled more examples bringing the number of class 62 to 129. The Hellenic State Railways in Greece acquired 20 S100s and designated them class Δα (Delta-alpha). Österreichische Bundesbahnen in Austria acquired 10 and designated them class 989. Ferrovie dello Stato in Italy acquired four and designated them class 831.

Several were sold into industrial use in the US, including to Georgia Power and Oklahoma Gas & Electric.

The Oranje-Nassau Mijnen, a coal mining company in The Netherlands acquired two S100s, former USATC no.s 4389 (Davenport 2533) and 1948 (Davenport 2513), and renumbered them ON-26 and ON-27 respectively. ON-26 remains preserved on the Stoomtrein Goes-Borsele tourist railway.

Other S100s entered British industrial use with the National Coal Board, Longmoor Military Railway, Austin Motor Company and others.

China acquired about 20 S100s, designating them class XK2. In 1946, Egyptian State Railways bought eight and numbered them 1151–1158. The UK War Department loaned six to Palestine Railways. In 1946 PR bought two of these, both of which subsequently entered the stock of Israel Railways in 1948.

Iraqi State Railways bought five, designated them Class SA, and gave them fleet numbers 1211–1215. All five were Davenport-built examples. At least two were still in service in March 1967: 1211 at Basrah and 1214 as the station pilot at Baghdad West.

=== Southern Railway ===
Southern Railway USA class
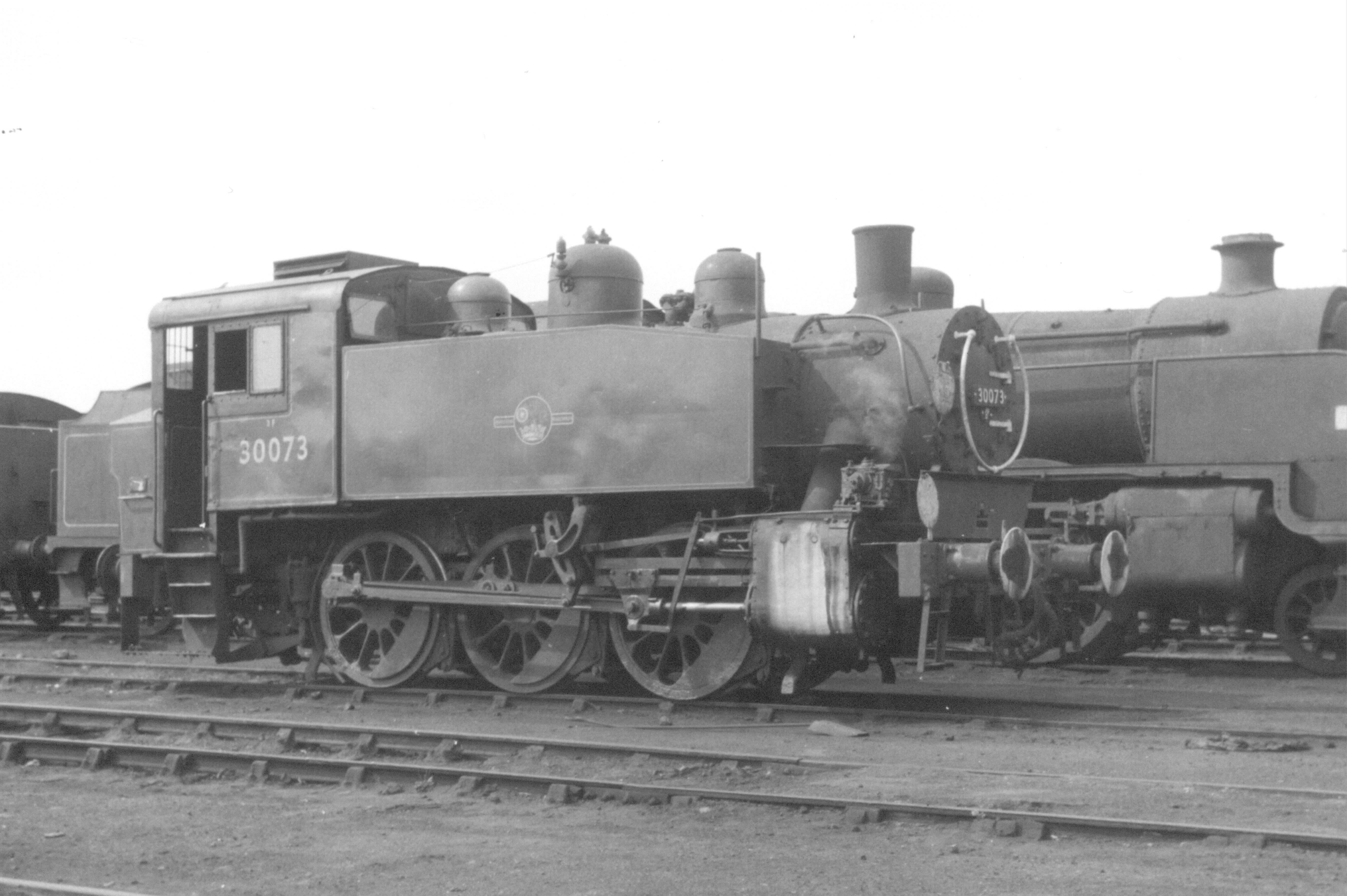
- USA class locomotive No. 30073 at Eastleigh MPD in August 1966.
Type and origin
- Power type: Steam
- Designer: Col. Howard G. Hill.
- Builder: Vulcan Iron Works, USA (13); H. K. Porter, Inc., USA (2)
- Model: S100
- Build date: 1942-43
Specifications
- Configuration
  - Whyte: 0-6-0T
  - UIC: C n2t
- Gauge: 4 ft 8 1/2 in (1,435 mm) standard gauge
- Driver dia.: 55.2 in (1.402 m)
- Wheelbase: 10 ft 0 in (3.05 m)
- Length: 29 ft 8 in (9.04 m)
- Loco weight: 46 long tons 10 cwt (47.2 t; 52.1 short tons)
- Fuel type: Coal
- Fuel capacity: 17.8 short hundredweight (0.81 t; 0.79 long tons)
- Water cap.: 1,000 imp gal (4,500 L; 1,200 US gal)
- Boiler pressure: 210 psi (1.45 MPa)
- Cylinders: Two, outside
- Cylinder size: 16 1/2 in × 24 in (419 mm × 610 mm)
- Valve gear: Walschaerts
- Valve type: 8 in (203 mm) piston valves
Performance figures
- Tractive effort: 21,630 lbf (96.22 kN)
Career
- Operators: Southern Railway; British Railways
- Class: SR: USA
- Power class: BR: 3F
- Number in class: 14 (plus one bought for spares)
- Nicknames: Yank Tanks
- Locale: Southampton Docks
- Withdrawn: 1962, 1965–1967
- Preserved: 30064, 30065, 30070, 30072, others of base S100 class
- Disposition: Four preserved, remainder scrapped

The Southern Railway (UK) bought 15 S100s (14 for operational use and one for spare parts) and designated them USA Class. They were purchased and adapted to replace the LSWR B4 class then working in Southampton Docks. SR staff nicknamed them "Yank Tanks".

By 1946 the SR needed either to renew or replace the ageing B4, D1 and E1 class tanks used in Southampton Docks, but Eastleigh Works was not in a position to do so in a timely manner or at an economic price. The replacement locomotives would need to have a short wheelbase to negotiate the tight curves found in the dockyard, but be able to haul heavy goods trains as well as full-length passenger trains in the harbour area. The railway's Chief mechanical engineer, Oliver Bulleid therefore inspected the surplus War Department tank locomotives. The Hunslet Austerity 0-6-0ST locomotives stored at the Longmoor Military Railway proved to be unsuitable for dock work because of their 11 ft 0 in (3.35 m) wheelbase and inside cylinders; also many of the survivors were in poor condition. However, the S100s stored at Newbury Racecourse had a 10 ft 0 in (3.05 m) wheelbase, outside cylinders and had hardly been used. Those available for sale had been built by the Vulcan Iron Works of Wilkes-Barre Pennsylvania and H. K. Porter, Inc, of Pittsburgh.

Bulleid therefore took Vulcan-built locomotive WD4326 on approval in May 1946 and tested it thoroughly over the next few months. When it was found to be suitable, this locomotive and a further thirteen were purchased in 1947 for £2500 each. Six of these had been built by Porter and the remainder by Vulcan. However, when it was discovered that there were differences in dimensions between the locomotives from different builders the SR exchanged its Porter built locomotives for Vulcans, but could only do so with five examples. The railway therefore accepted one Porter locomotive at a reduced price and purchased another to provide spare parts. Thus, the thirteen further locomotives entered traffic between April and November 1947 as soon as they had been adapted.

By the mid-1950s the S100's were shunting and trip working alongside the LB&SCR E2 class locomotives at Southampton Docks to replace withdrawn E1 class. They served there until being replaced by BR class 07 diesel shunters in 1962.

==== Construction and adaptation ====
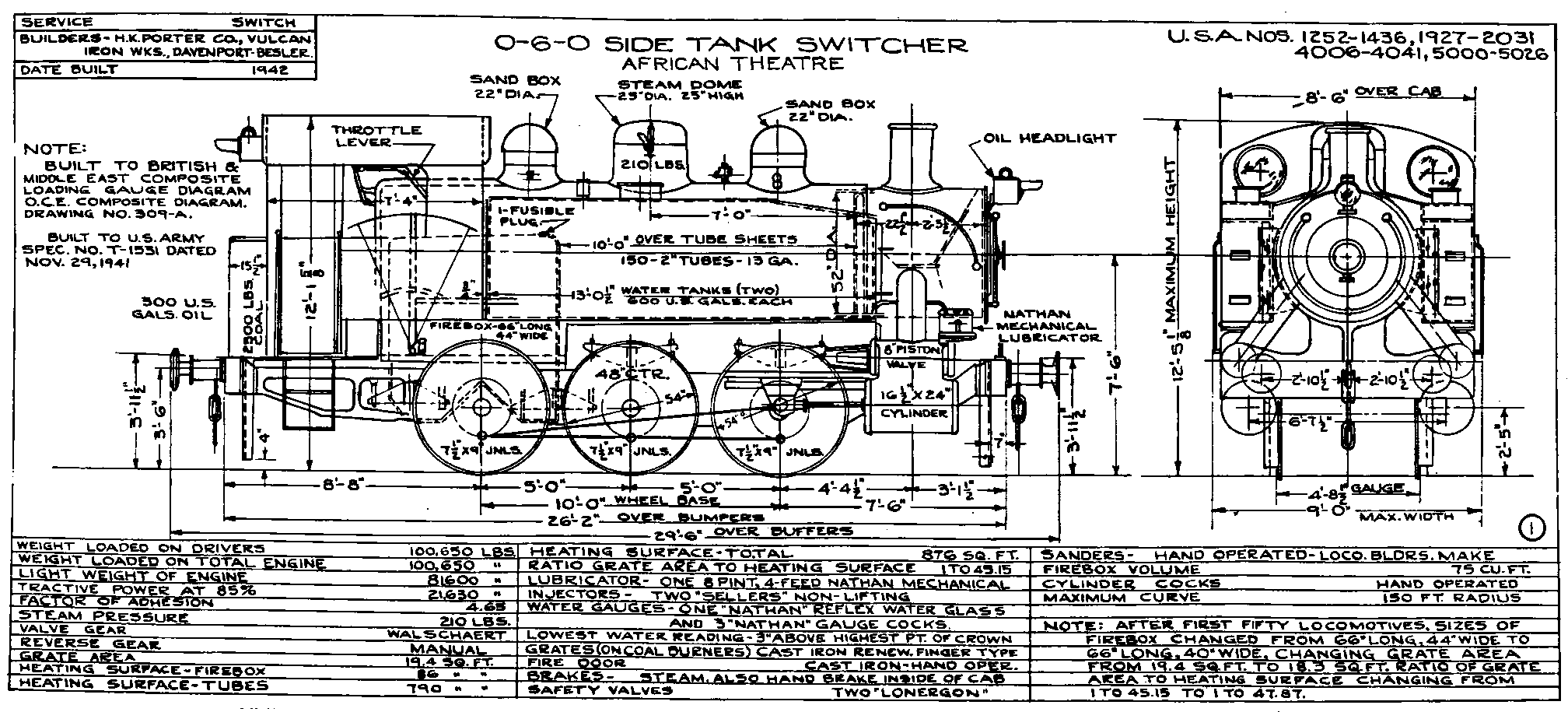
Original drawings for the S100, dated 29 November 1941.

Following purchase, members of the class were fitted with steam heating, vacuum ejectors, sliding cab windows, additional lamp irons and new cylinder drain cocks. Further modifications became necessary once the locomotives started to enter traffic, including large roof-top ventilators, British-style regulators (as built they had US-style pull-out ones), three rectangular cab-front lookout windows, extended coal bunkers, separate steam and vacuum brake controls and wooden tip-up seats. This meant that it took until November 1947 for the entire class to be ready for work. Radio-telephones were later installed on the footplate to improve communication on the vast network of sidings at Southampton.

The class was allocated the British Railways (BR) power classification 3F following nationalisation in 1948.

==== Numbering ====
The original locomotive carried the War Department number 4326, and the subsequent purchase were numbered between 1264 and 1284 and between 1952 and 1973. Thirteen of the locomotives were re-numbered in a single sequence from 61 to 73 by SR but 4326 retained its War Department number. The locomotive used for spares was not numbered. After 1948 they were renumbered 30061–30074 by BR. Six examples were transferred to departmental (non-revenue earning) use in 1962/3 and renumbered DS233–DS238.

==== Livery ====
During the Second World War they were painted USATC black with white numbering and lettering 'Transportation Dept.' on the tank sides. Prior to nationalisation, the locomotives were painted in Southern black livery with 'Southern' in "Sunshine Yellow" lettering. The lettering on the tank sides was changed to 'British Railways' during 1948 as a transitional measure. Finally, in the mid 1960s several of the class were painted in a malachite livery (the green of the old Southern), with BR crests on the water tank sides and numbers on the cab sides.

==== Operational details ====
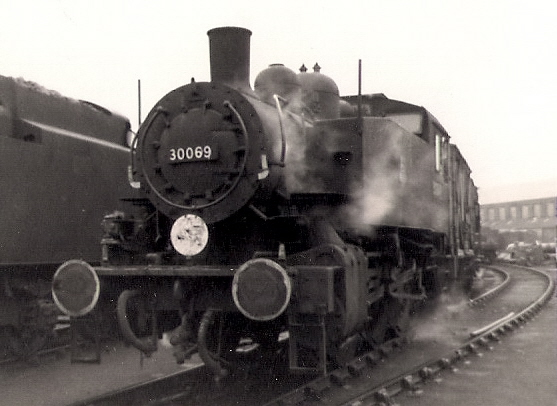
30069 at Eastleigh Works in 1966

For fifteen years the entire class was used for shunting and carriage and van heating in Southampton Docks. They performed well and were popular with the footplatemen, but the limited bunker capacity often necessitated the provision of relief engines for some of the longer duties. Two examples were fitted with extended bunkers to address this problem in 1959 and 1960, but a more ambitious plan to extend the frames and build larger bunkers was abandoned in 1960 due to the imminent dieselization of the docks. They also often suffered from overheated axle boxes which was less of a problem when shunting but prevented them from being used on longer journeys.

A more serious issue was the condition of the steel fireboxes originally fitted to the class which rusted and fatigued quickly. This was partly due to their construction under conditions of austerity, and the hard water present in the docks. This came to a head in 1951 when several had to be laid aside until new fireboxes could be constructed. Thereafter there were no further problems.

The class was replaced from their shunting duties at Southampton from 1962 by British Rail Class 07 diesel-electric shunters, when the first member of the class was withdrawn, but the remainder were still in fairly good condition. The survivors were used for informal departmental purposes such as providing steam heating at Southampton or shunting at Eastleigh Motive Power Depot, before the withdrawal. 30072 became the shed pilot locomotive at Guildford Motive Power Depot in 1963, replacing a B4. Although malachite painted 30064 was substituted in 1964 it soon returned to Eastleigh, later having a short spell at Meldon Quarry near Okehampton (August - October 1966) when it was the last steam locomotive active on the Western Region. No. 30072 continued as pilot at Guildford until the end of steam on the Southern in July 1967, when it was the last to leave Guildford. During the mid 1960s six examples were officially transferred to ‘departmental’ duties and renumbered. These went to Redbridge Sleeper Depot (DS233), Meldon Quarry (DS234), Lancing Carriage Works (DS235 and DS236), and Ashford wagon works (DS237 and DS238; where they were named Maunsell and Wainwright).

Nine examples remained in service until March 1967 and five of these survived until the end of steam on the Southern Region four months later. Two of these engines, 30065/DS237 and 30070/DS238, were sold to Woodham Brothers in South Wales in March 1968. However, before they could make their journey, their bearings ran hot and were declared "unfit for travel" which led to the two tank engines being dumped at Tonbridge. Five months later, they were taken to Rolvenden when they were purchased for preservation.

==== Stock list ====
USATC No.	SR No.	BR Temp No.	BR No.	Dept No.	Builder	Year	To Departamental Stock	Withdrawn	Notes
1264	61		30061	DS233	Porter 7420	1942	October 1962	March 1967	
1277	62		30062	DS234	Vulcan 4375	1942	December 1962	March 1967	
1284	63		30063		Vulcan 4382	1942		May 1962	Withdrawn due to collision damage
1959	64	s64	30064		Vulcan 4432	1943		July 1967	Preserved
1968	65		30065	DS237	Vulcan 4441	1943	November 1963	September 1967	Preserved
1279	66		30066	DS235	Vulcan 4377	1942	March 1963	August 1965	
1282	67		30067		Vulcan 4380	1942		July 1967	
1971	68		30068		Vulcan 4444	1943		June 1964	
1952	69		30069		Vulcan 4425	1943		July 1967	
1960	70		30070	DS238	Vulcan 4433	1943	August 1963	September 1967	Preserved
1966	71		30071		Vulcan 4439	1943		July 1967	
1973	72		30072		Vulcan 4446	1943		July 1967	Preserved
1974	73	s73	30073		Vulcan 4437	1943		December 1966	
4326	74*		30074	DS236	Vulcan 4488	1943	April 1963	August 1965	Never carried SR number

== Postwar design influence ==
Several European railways produced designs based on the S100. JŽ added to their class 62 by ordering several similar examples from Đuro Đaković (factory) of Slavonski Brod, Croatia. These differed in minor details, principally the use of plate frames instead of bar frames, resulting in a higher boiler pitch. This gives the steam pipes a shoulder instead of being straight, and requires smaller domes with a flatter top to fit JŽ's loading gauge.

The British Great Western Railway (GWR) had used many S100s in South Wales during the Second World War. The GWR 1500 Class was partially inspired by the S100 in its use of outside cylinders and short wheelbase.

== Continuing commercial use ==
A small number of former JŽ 62s remain in commercial service, more than 65 years after they were built. At least two work as switcher locomotives (shunter locomotives) at the ArcelorMittal steel plant in Zenica, Bosnia-Herzegovina.

== Survival and preservation ==
More than 100 S100s survive: either preserved, stored, or derelict. Most are in Europe or North America, but there are also two in China and one in Egypt. Project 62 has an online database of them.

Private owners in Baraboo, Wisconsin, are currently restoring S100 #5002. #5002 was used for the Naval Yards in Philadelphia, Pennsylvania, and later sold to the EJ Lavino Company in Pennsylvania, then sold to Tombstone Junction and later to the Kentucky Railroad Museum.

In 2006, one was purchased for preservation from a steelworks in central Bosnia and was sent to Britain.

Two JŽ 62s were exported to Canada after being purchased by Marineland in Niagara Falls, Ontario for operation in their park, but ultimately remained stored until donated to the Niagara Railway Museum.

USATC No.	Builder	Post World War II Owner	Location	Image
1310	Davenport 2481	SEK Δα61	Thessaloniki, Greece	
1311	Davenport 2482	Anshan Steel XK2-51	Sujiatun, Liaoning, China	
1396	H.K. Porter 7510	JŽ 62-084	Gračac, Croatia	
1400	H.K. Porter 7514	JŽ 62-086	Pancevo, Serbia	
1415	H.K. Porter 7529	SEK Δα53	Thessaloniki, Greece	
1430	H.K. Porter 7544	Benxi Steel XK2-28	Benxi, Liaoning, China	
1433	Porter 7547	JZ 62-019	Maribor, Slovenia	
1923	Vulcan 4770		U.S. Army Transportation Museum	
1959	Vulcan 4432	SR 64 later BR 30064	Privately owned	
1960	Vulcan 4433	SR 70 later BR 30070	Kent and East Sussex Railway	
1961	Vulcan 4434	ÖBB 989.01 later Zuckerfabrik Siegendorf 2	Probstdorf, Austria	
1968	Vulcan 4441	SR 65 later BR 30065	Kent and East Sussex Railway	
1973	Vulcan 4445	SR 72 later BR 30072	East Lancashire Railway	
1987	Vulcan 4460	SEK Δα65	Tithorea, Greece	
1999	Vulcan 4472	SEK Δα55	Railway Museum of Thessaloniki, Thessaloniki, Greece	
4332	Vulcan 4494	JZ 62-037	Krmelj, Slovenia	
4383	Davenport 2532	SNCF 030.TU.22	Musée vivant du chemin de fer, Longueville, France	
4389	Davenport 2533	Oranje-Nassau coal mines	Stoomtrein Goes - Borsele, Netherlands	
4400	Davenport 2549	SEK Δα57	Thessaloniki, Greece	
5000	Porter 7460	FerroCarril Occidental de Mexico No1	Culican, Mexico	
5001	H.K. Porter 7461	Granite Rock Co. 10	California State Railroad Museum	
5002	H.K. Porter 7462	EJ Lavino & Co 2	U.S. Army Transportation Museum	
5003	Porter 7463	FerroCarril Occidental de Mexico No2	National Railway Museum, Puebla	
5006	H.K. Porter 7466	Oklahoma Gas & Electric 5	Oklahoma Railway Museum	
5012	Porter 7486	Bonsal No7	North Carolina Transportation Museum	
5014	H.K. Porter 7488		Goldfield, Nevada	
5025	H.K. Porter 7499	Albermarle Paper Co 1	Old Dominion Chapter NRHS	
5041	H.K. Porter 7584	JŽ 62-046	Chemin de fer touristique Haut Quercy, Martel, France	
5050	H.K. Porter 7593	Georgia Power Company 97	Southeastern Railway Museum	
6008	Davenport 2597	SEK Δα63	Railway Museum of Thessaloniki, Thessaloniki, Greece	
6013	Davenport 2602	SEK Δα59	Thessaloniki, Greece	
6022	Davenport 2611	JZ 62-054	Croatian Railway Museum, Zagreb	
6102	H.K. Porter 7682	SNCF 030.TU.13	Saint Pierre du Regard, France	
6171	Vulcan 4541	JZ 62-070	Zagorje, Slovenia	
6172	Vulcan 4542	SEK Δα60	Thessaloniki, Greece	
6175	Vulcan 4545	JZ 62-073	Smederevo, Serbia	

=== USA class ===
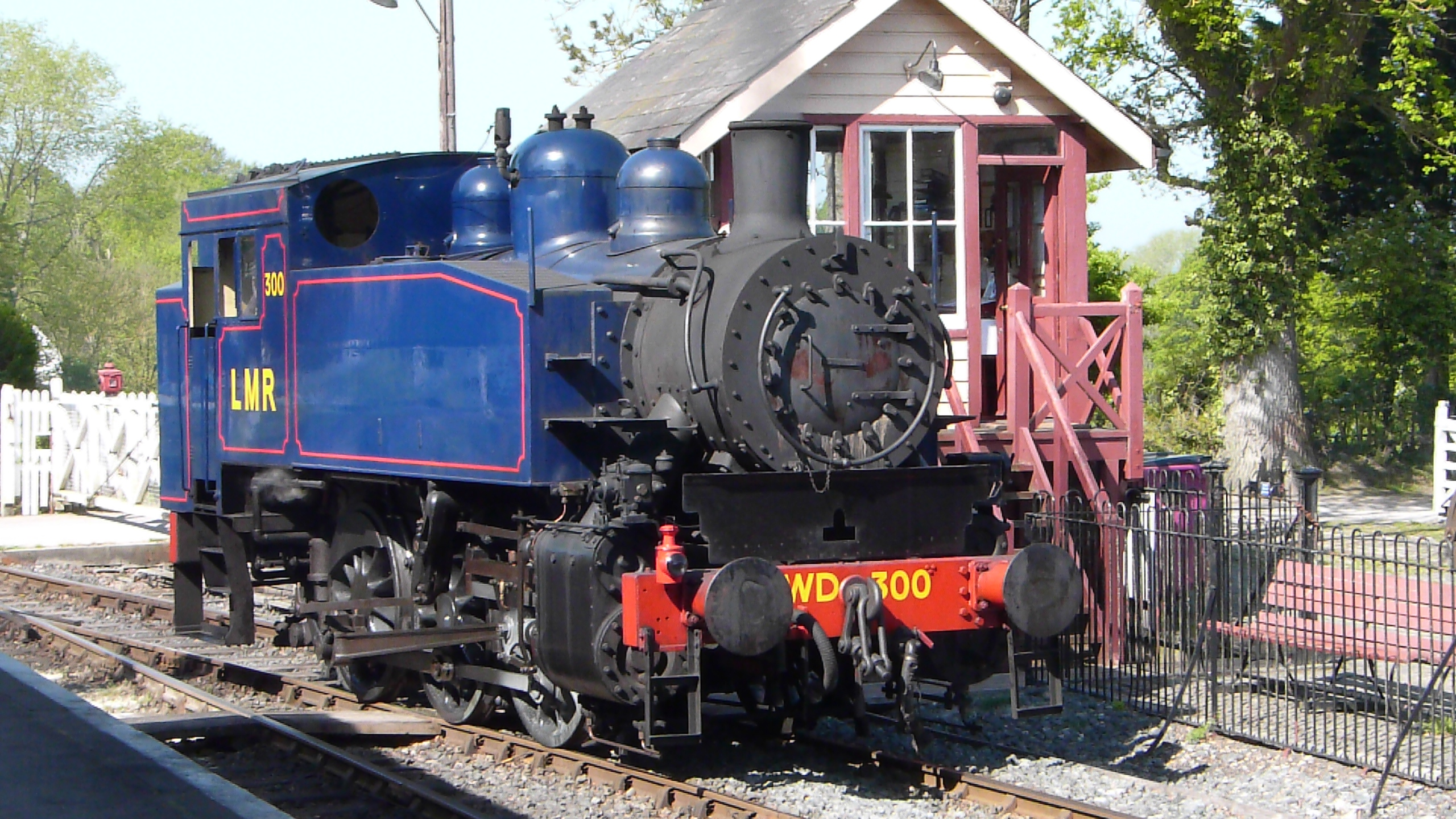
Former 30070 in preservation with Longmoor Military Railway livery

Four British examples of the USA class have been preserved:

- 30064 Privately owned - (Previously preserved at the Bluebell Railway but left in 2022 after being purchased by a private buyer with plans to restore to working order).
- 30065 Kent and East Sussex Railway - (Under overhaul)
- 30070 Kent and East Sussex Railway - (Operational) Returned to service in December 2017 following overhaul and outshopped in Longmoor Military Railway Lined Blue as No. 300 Frank S. Ross.
- 30072 East Lancashire Railway - (Undergoing major boiler repairs)

Two JŽ class 62 locomotives built by the former Yugoslav Railways to foreign design have been acquired for use on the North Dorset Railway and given British liveries. There are minor technical differences.

- *30075 (formerly 62-669 built 1960- (Undergoing overhaul)
- *30076 (formerly 62-521 built 1954- Stored).

== Gallery ==
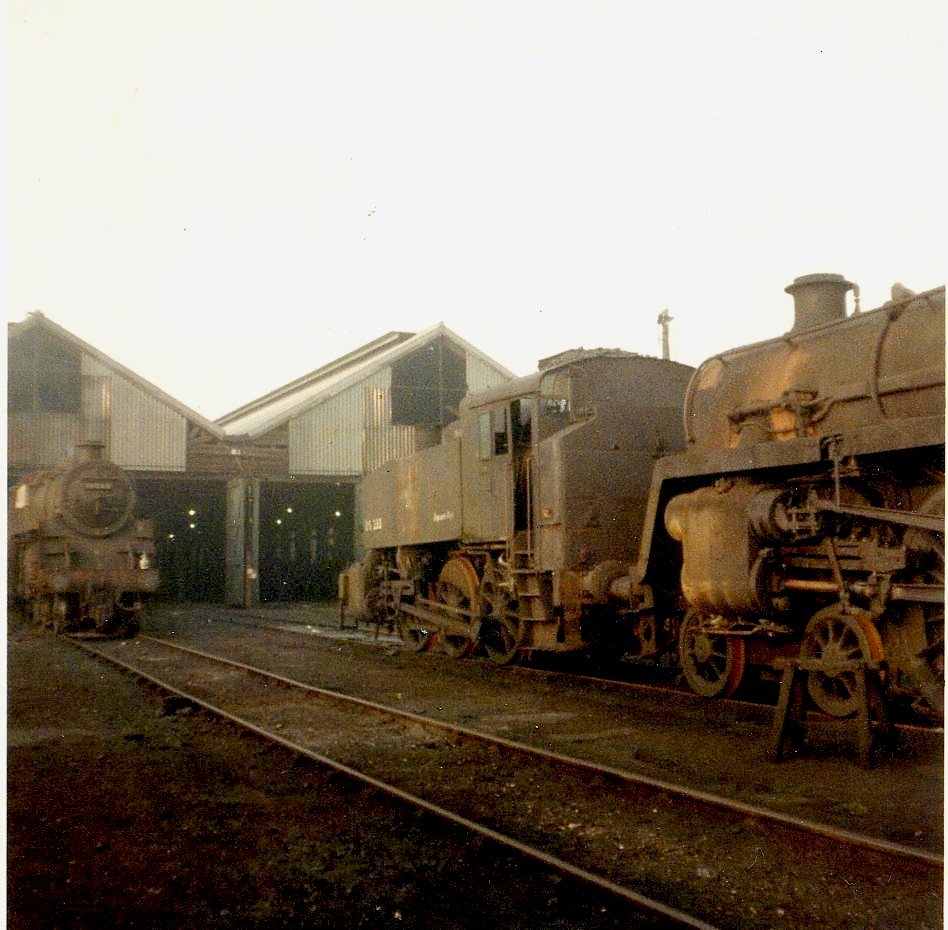
Southern Railway (GB) USA Class at Eastleigh locomotive depot in February 1967. Photo: Keith Chambers

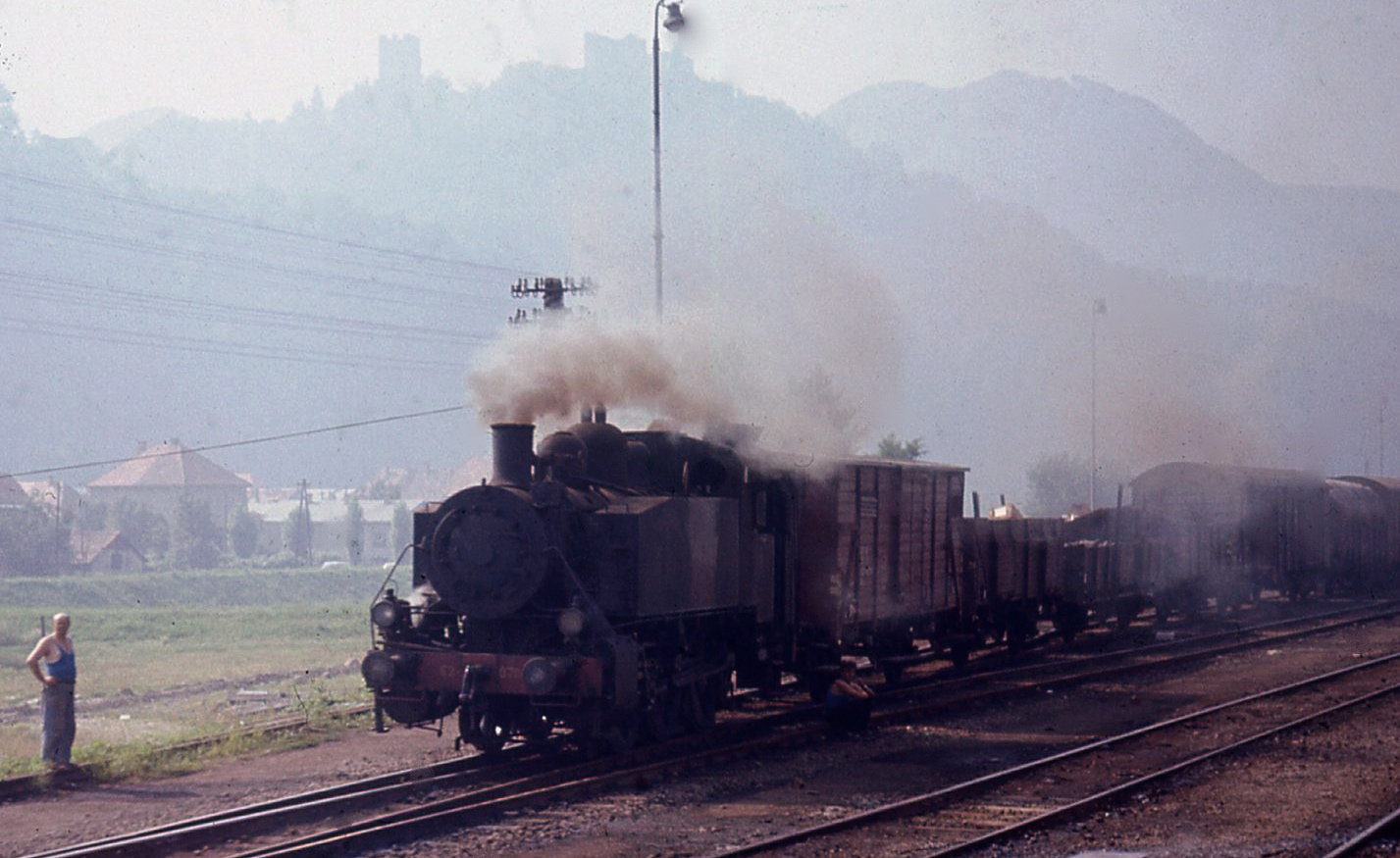
Yugoslav Railways (JŽ) No. 62 070 shunts between Zidani Most and Maribor in August 1971.

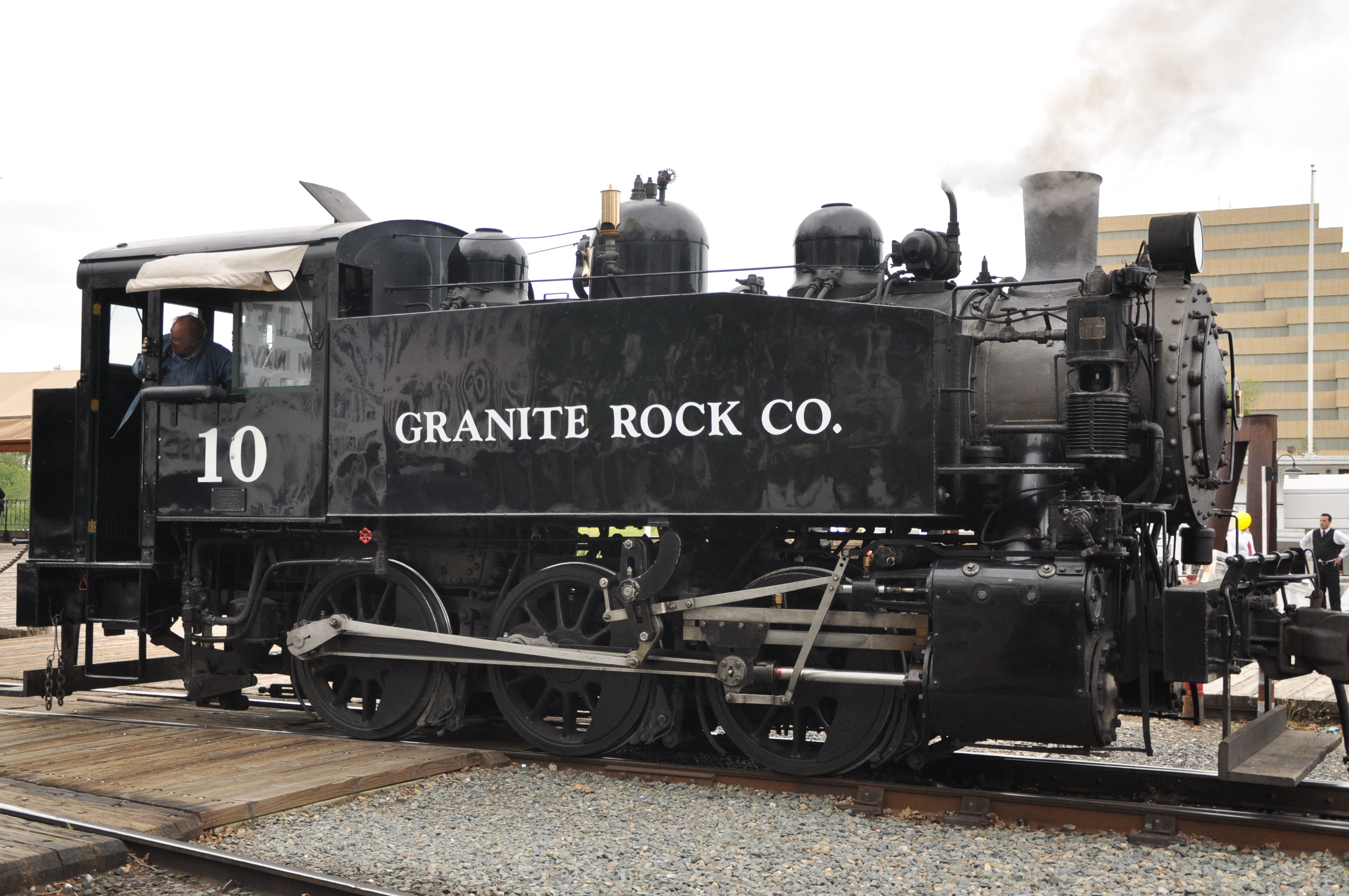
Locomotive (7461 of 1942; originally USATC 5001), operated by the California State Railroad Museum in Sacramento.

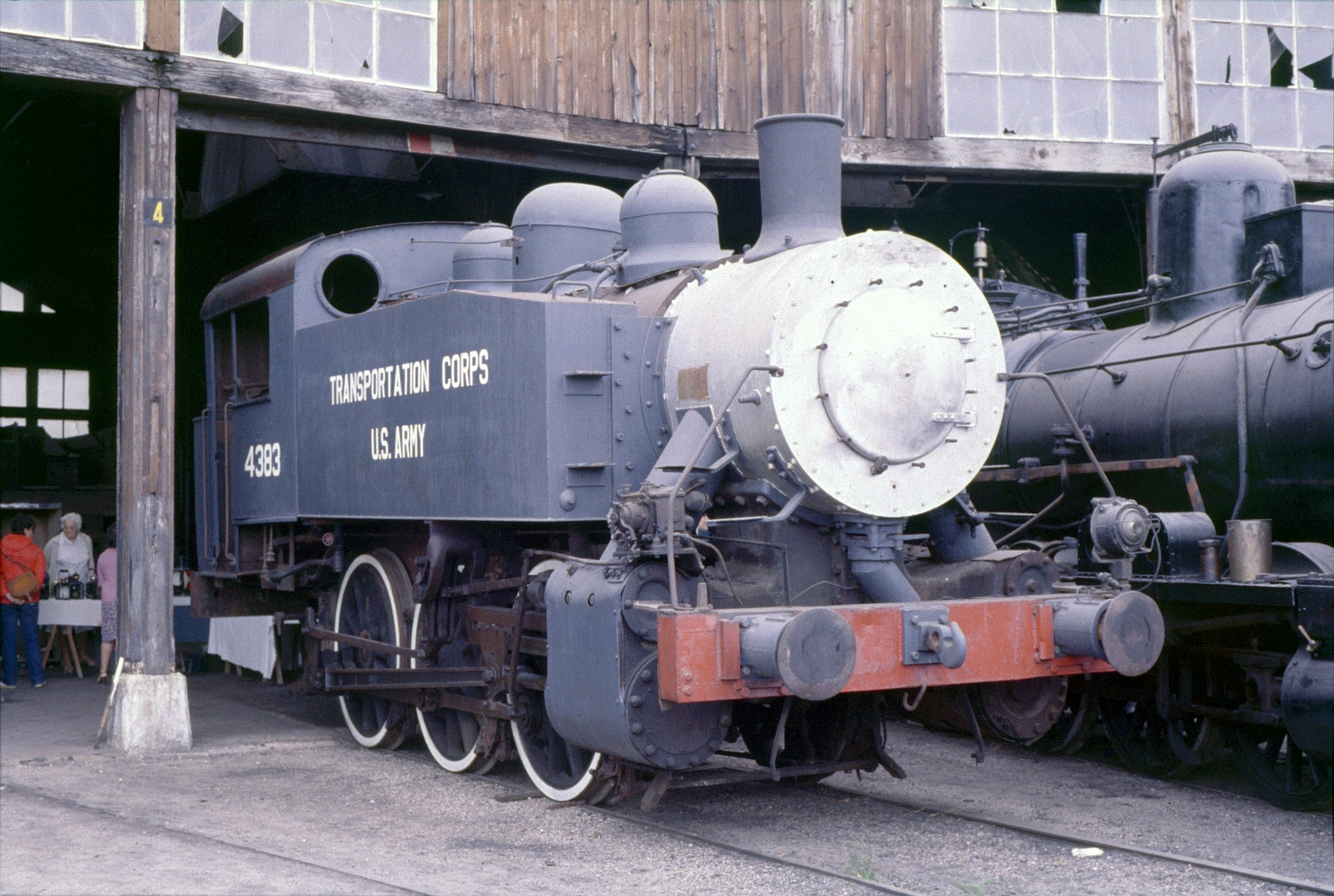
Locomotive 4383 preserved in Longueville dépôt (France).

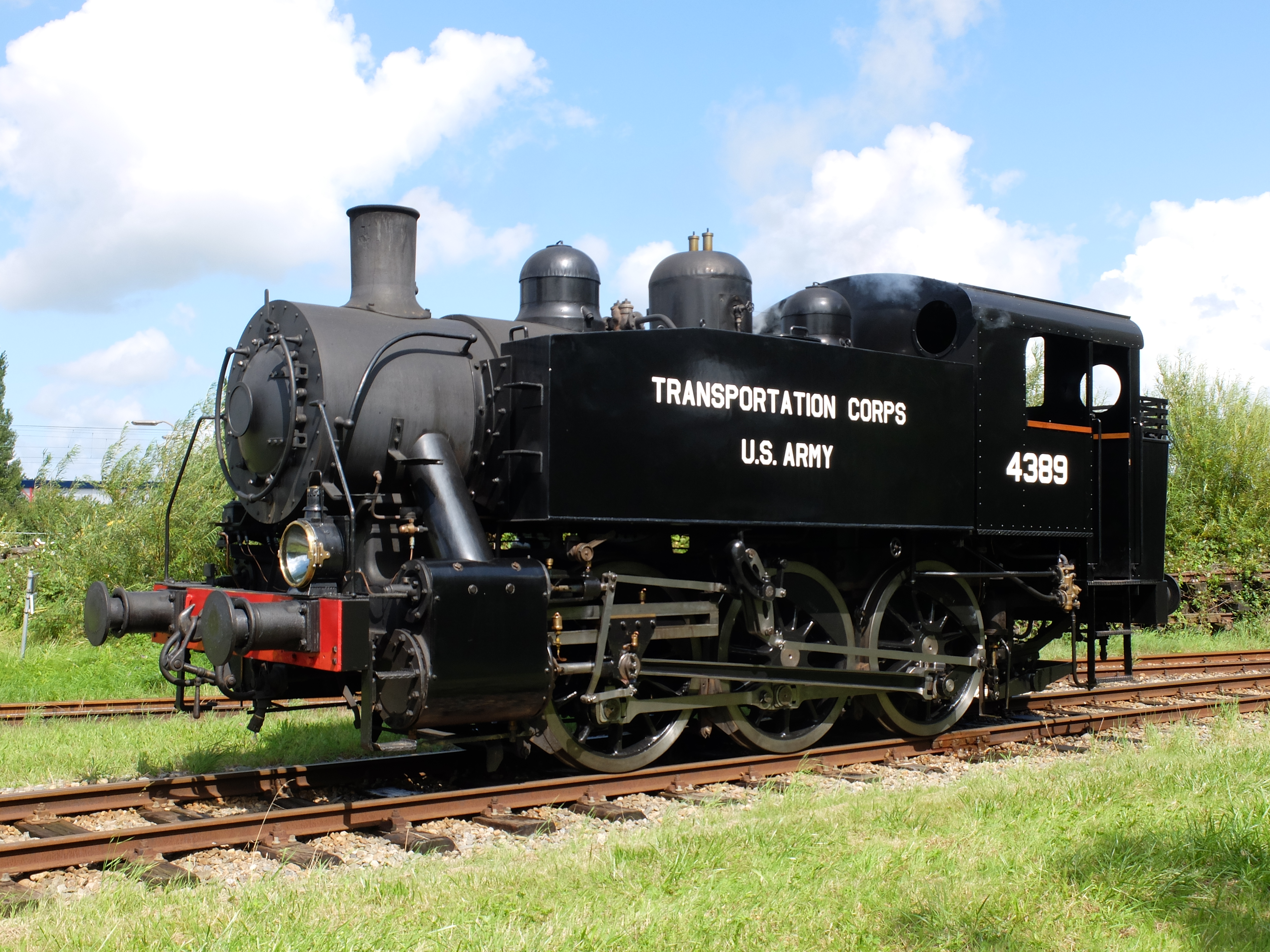
Locomotive 4389 in Goes (Davenport No. 2533)

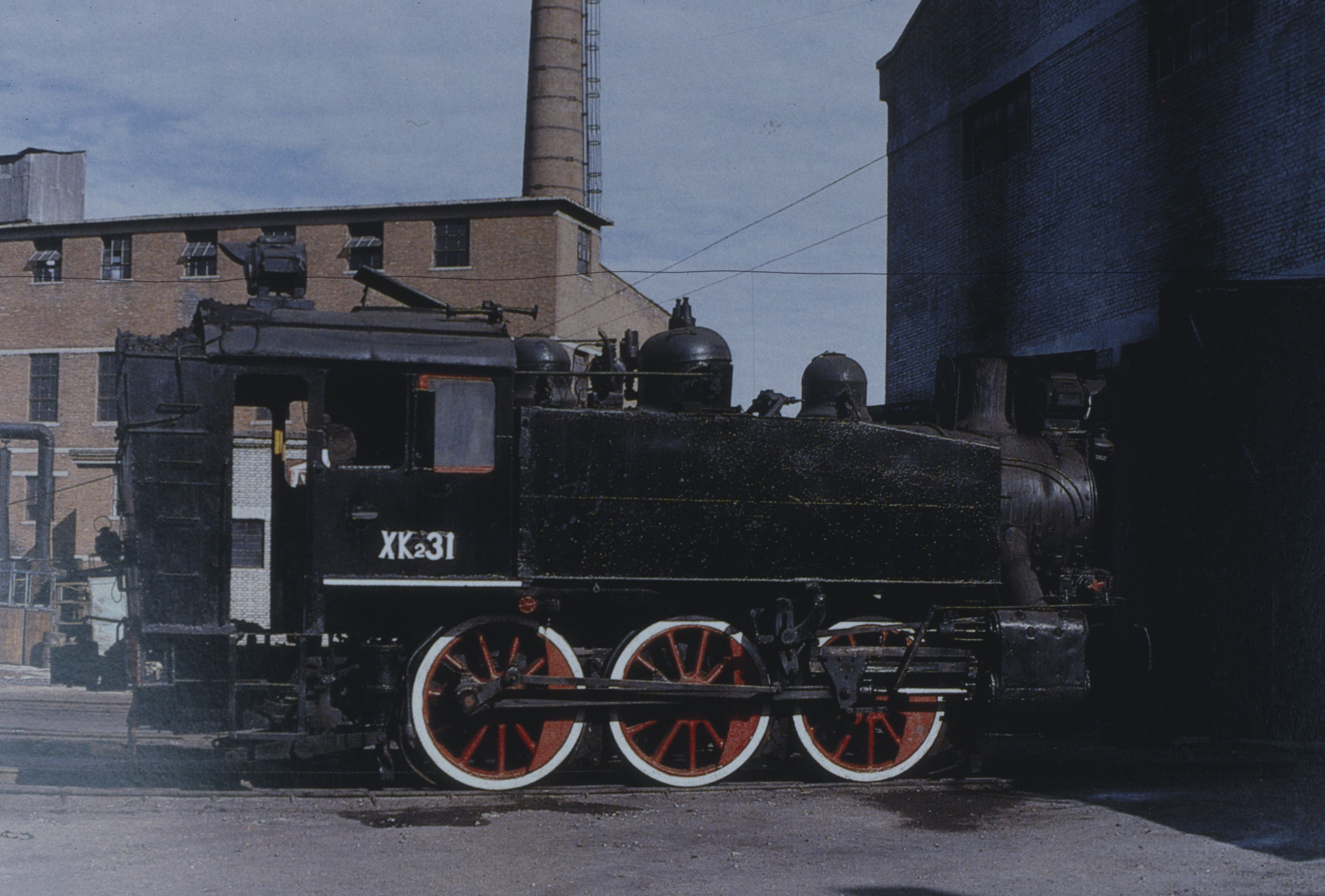
China Railways XK2-31 in Anshan, 1987
