= Senator Pettibone =

Senator Pettibone may refer to:

- Charles Pettibone (1841–1925), Wisconsin State Senate
- John Owen Pettibone (1787–1876), Connecticut State Senate
