= North Dorset Railway =

Heritage railway in England

Coordinates: 50.9042°N 2.2507°W

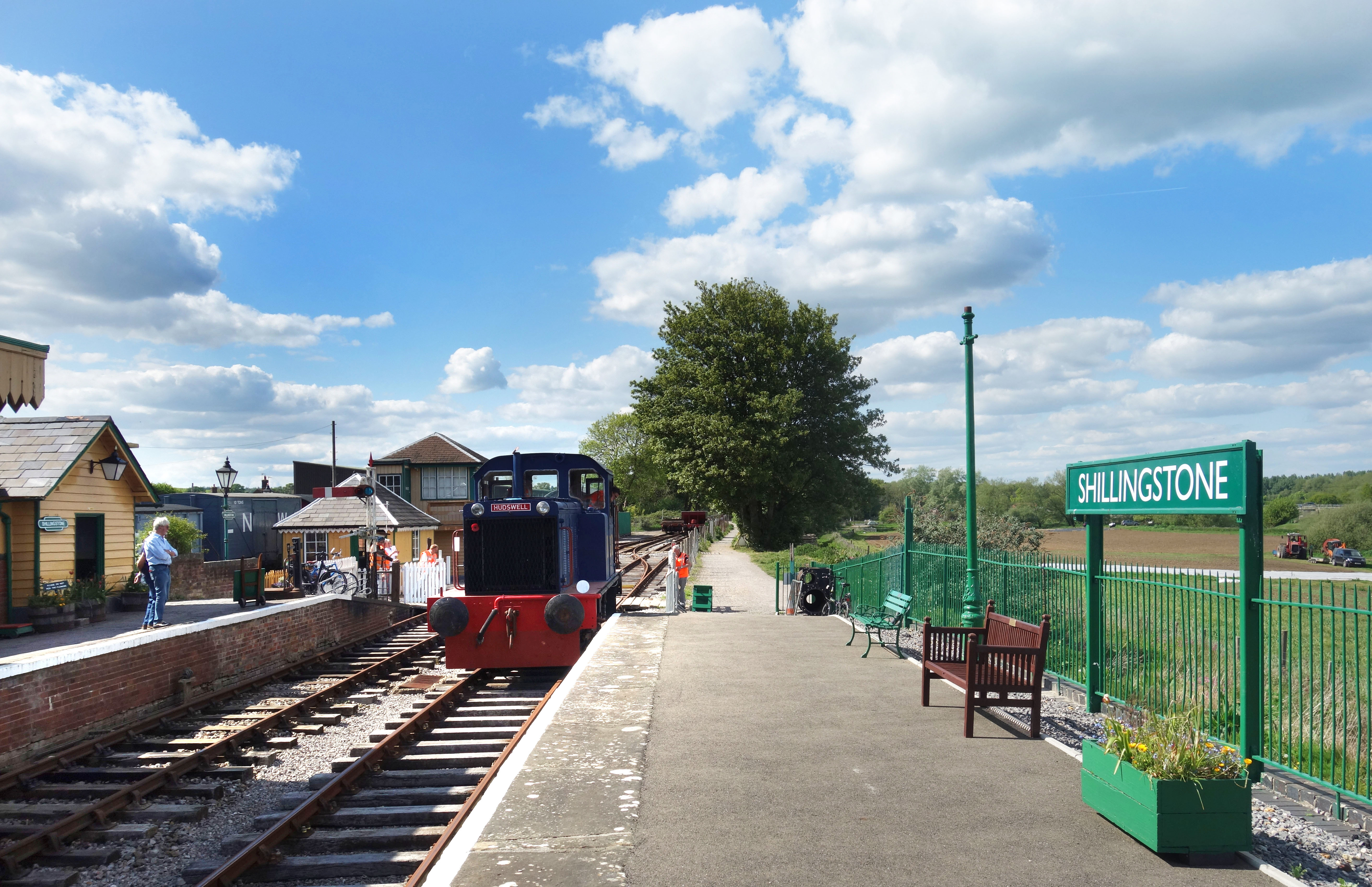
- MSC No. D1 "Ashdown" moving at Shillingstone railway station in 2022
- Locale: Dorset

Commercial operations
- Name: Somerset and Dorset Joint Railway
- Built by: Dorset Central Railway
- Original gauge: 4 ft 8 1/2 in (1,435 mm) standard gauge

Preserved operations
- Operated by: North Dorset Railway
- Stations: 1
- Length: 0.5 miles (0.8 km)
- Preserved gauge: 4 ft 8 1/2 in (1,435 mm) standard gauge

Commercial history
- Opened: 31 August 1863
- Closed: 7 March 1966

Preservation history
- 1990s: North Dorset Railway Trust formed
- 2005: Lease for Shillingstone Station granted
- 2008: First track relaid
- 2026: License exemption to run passenger services as a heritage railway granted
- Headquarters: Shillingstone railway station

Website
- www.northdorsetrailway.co.uk

North Dorset Railway (previously known as the Shillingstone Station Project, the North Dorset Railway Trust and the Shillingstone Railway Project) is a heritage railway based at Shillingstone railway station on the former Somerset and Dorset Joint Railway in the United Kingdom.

The project's present aim is to restore the current leased length of 1,200 feet (370 m) single track mainline, with a passing loop between the platforms. Double track has been laid through the station using 95 bullhead rail extending to the current northern and southern boundaries. A siding to serve the loading dock has been completed. A planning application was submitted in December 2020 to extend a single track north over Lamb House Bridge to Bere Marsh, with the ultimate aim to provide a rail link to Sturminster Newton, working in harmony with the North Dorset Trailway. The signal box, down platform shelter, permanent way huts, signals and pole route have been rebuilt. The NDRT rebuilt the 400 foot down platform wall and replaced and repaired the platform edge slabs. The North Dorset Trailway has been rerouted to run alongside the 395-foot (120 m) 'down' platform on a new embankment.

There is a small museum on site. The Station Gardens are also a prominent feature for the 28,000 visitors that come annually. The NDR membership continues to grow and in 2020 exceeded 500.

== Buildings ==
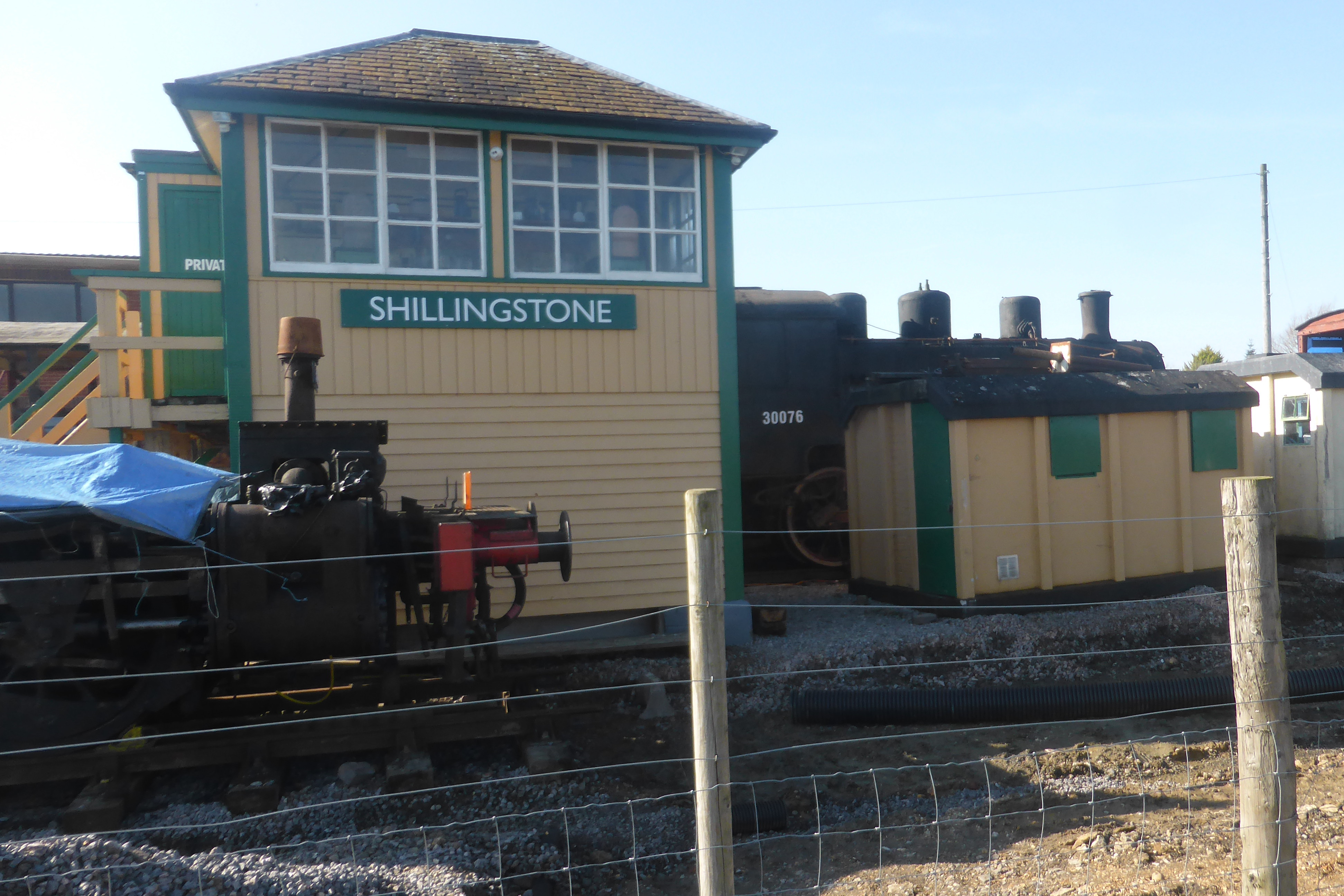
The Signal Box and lineside Hut in 2019.

The main station building houses a café and shop. The registered museum displays some of the artefacts donated over the years. The signal box has been rebuilt and fitted with one signal. The south end of the up platform has been rebuilt and the picnic area above landscaped with a garden—an outdoor 'O' scale model railway was built there but was removed in 2019. A new siding was laid to accommodate the catering carriage at present outside the main station platform which serves as additional café accommodation. The down platform waiting shelter has been rebuilt in its original position and now serves as storage.

== Stations ==
- Sturminster Newton - A long-term aim of the NDR is to restore the line to Sturminster Newton as stated in the current NDR literature. The 'Railway Garden' in the centre of the town commemorates the previous route of the Somerset and Dorset Joint Railway. NDR has engaged with local councillors and officers to plan a gateway feature including a signal, interpretation boards and a level crossing gate as the trackbed enters Sturminster Newton.
- Shillingstone - The base for North Dorset Railway - the only remaining station built to a Dorset Central Railway design in 1863.
- Stourpaine & Durweston Halt - In private hands.

== Activity ==
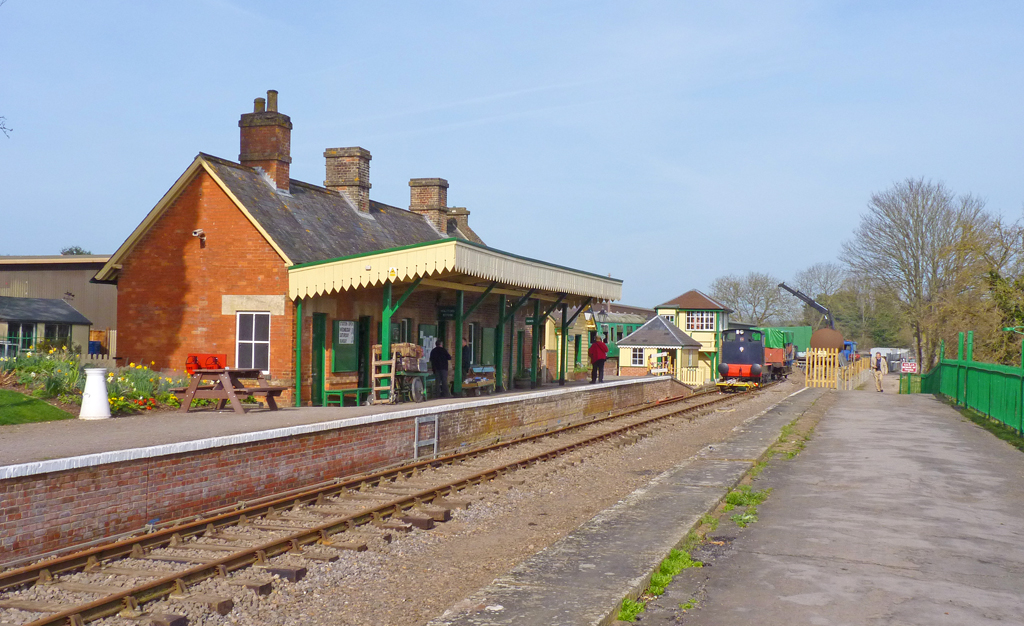
The main station building at Shillingstone Station in 2012, fully restored.

In 2009, 210 feet (64 m) of the up main track through the station was laid and ballasted using 110a and 113a flat bottom rail and wooden sleepers. The Ruston & Hornsby diesel shunter was moved from the isolated goods dock. This was the first standard gauge loco on the Somerset & Dorset mainline south of the Mendips and north of Blandford, since the demolition train departed in July 1967, exactly 42 years before.

Progress in 2010 included acquiring a tracked Priestman Mustang excavator, finishing construction of the up platform wall, regrading of the cattle dock track bed and preparations for track-laying, and the connection of the station to the mains drainage system.

=== Northward extension ===
The NDR submitted in December 2020 a planning application for a northward extension over Lamb House Bridge: this was approved in April 2021 with permission to extend the line 400 m north of the station. Trees were felled and bushes cleared on the section of the embankment between the station and Lamb House Bridge. In accordance with the planning permission granted by Dorset Council, a temporary diversion was created allowing the public to continue to use the Trailway whilst a new Trailway was constructed along the eastern side of the embankment so that the trackbed for the Northern extension could be restored along the western side of the embankment. The permanent Trailway diversion was completed during the Summer of 2022 and officially opened in August by Simon Hoare, MP. Throughout the summer of 2022 work continued reconstructing the embankment to the north of Lamb House Bridge and up to Cattle Creep Bridge, which had been excavated after the closure of the line to allow the construction of a tennis court, which was finally completed in late 2024.

In July 2025, the extension was finally connected up with the track in Shillingstone Station, with a golden screw being used to secure the final length of track. Then, a few months later in September 2025, the North Dorset Railway was given permission from Dorset Council to change over from a registered museum to an operational railway, with the railways intention to run trains from the station, to the end of the new length of track and back. On the 26 November 2025, after the northward 350 m (1,150 ft) extension had been relaid, the railways resident Hudswell Clarke 0-6-0 Diesel Loco "Ashdown" became the first locomotive to cross over Lamb House Bridge since the closure of the line in 1966. A month later, on 15 December 2025, JŽ Class 62 30075 would become the first steam locomotive to travel over the new extension and over Lamb House Bridge, as well as being the first time it has moved under its own power since entering preservation after being brought in 1990.

The trust would then have to wait for further approval from the Office of Rail and Road (ORR) to be able to run passengers services over there whole site, including this new extension. This would finally be granted in the form of a license exemption, which permits heritage railways such as the North Dorset Railway to run passenger services over existing lines without a full license, including any future extensions the ORR is made known of, such as the extension to Holloway Lane. The ORR granted permission for the NDR to operate services for just over a mile towards Cattle Creek in 2026.

=== Southward extension ===
In 2026, the NDR started consultations with Dorset Council in order to extend the line southwards towards Holloway lane, which would result in the line becoming 1.25 mi (2.01 km) long. Included in these talks is also the possibility of acquiring land for restoration and storage sheds.

== History ==
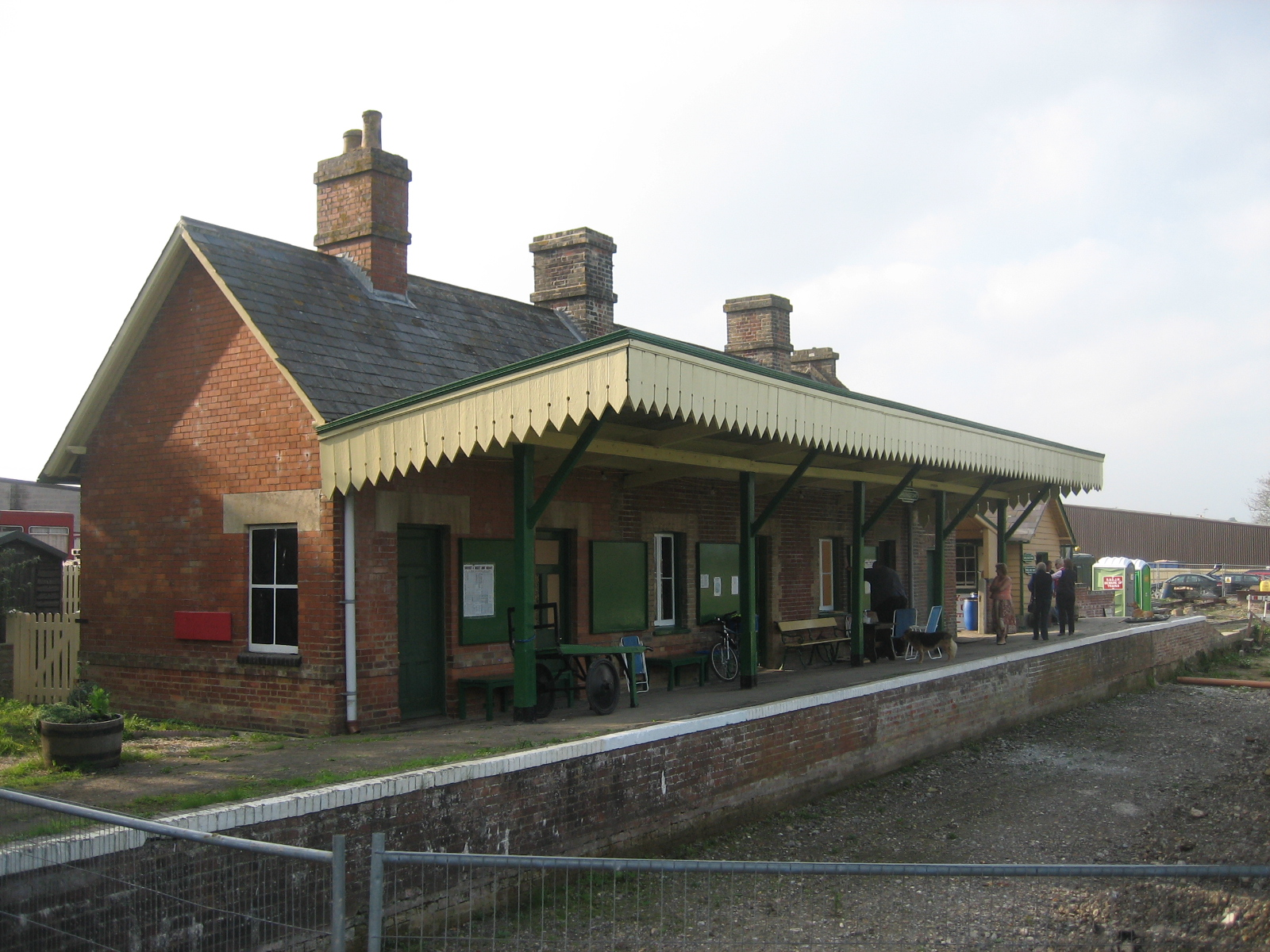
The main station building at Shillingstone Station, being refurbished in Southern Railway colours, October 2007

After the closure of Shillingstone railway station on 7 March 1966, and a few years post closure, the Dorset County Council purchased the trackbed for a proposed Shillingstone by-pass. Various furniture manufacturing companies were sited in the former station yard, and during the 1970s, industrial buildings were constructed, some of them making partial use of the station building.

By December 2002, the by-pass plan had been shelved and the station remained derelict. Dorset County Council decided to dispose of the redundant station and, after protracted negotiations lasting from 1998 to 2005, the North Dorset Railway Trust signed a lease for the former station site. The Trust's plan was to reopen the station as a tourist attraction, and restore the site to as it looked in the early 1950s under "The Shillingstone Station Project".

Restoration work commenced in 2006, and over the years the main building was repaired, and a replica signal box with a correct Stevens frame and tablet machines was constructed by volunteers. The Porter's office was reconstructed, and the Parcels office restored. Track-work within the station was completed by the summer of 2020.

In 2026, the railway received the only survivor of six four-wheeled railbuses built by Hertfordshire's Wickham & Co, originally specifically built as a track recording unit for the British Rail Research Division, before being converted for passenger use on heritage railways. The North Dorset Railway intends to begin restoration of the unit in spring 2027, in order to get it back into operation and increase that passenger carrying capacity of the railway itself.

== Rolling stock ==
=== Operational locomotives ===
Number & name	Type	Builder	Photograph	Livery	Notes
(MSC No. D1) “Ashdown”	Hudswell Clarke 0-6-0D	Hudswell Clarke		NDR Blue	Built in 1959 for the Manchester Ship Canal Railway. Returned to service in 2020 after being brought by the NDR.
No. TP57P	Wickham trolley Type 17A	D. Wickham & Co.		SR Green	Built in 1959 for the British Rail London Midland Region, Manchester. Returned to service in 2024, on loan to the NDR.
(62-669) 30075	JŽ Class 62 0-6-0T	Đuro Đaković		BR Lined Malachite Green	Built new in 1960 by Đuro Đaković, based on the United States Army Transportation Corps S100 Class design. Owned by the Project 62 Group and moved to Shillingstone in 2016, returned to service in 2025. Taken to the Plym Valley Railway in 2026 to undergo testing.

=== Locomotives under overhaul, repair or restoration ===
Number & name	Type	Builder	Photograph	Livery	Notes
RH305302 “Little Eva”	Ruston & Hornsby 48DS 4WDDM	Ruston & Hornsby		BR Lined Green	Built in 1951 for Ransome and Marles Bearing Co. Returned to service in 2016, currently undergoing restoration.
(62-521) 30076	JŽ Class 62 0-6-0T	Đuro Đaković		BR Lined Malachite Green	Built new in 1954 by Đuro Đaković, based on the United States Army Transportation Corps S100 Class design. Brought in 2006 by the Project 62 Group, moved to Shillingstone in 2016, now under-going overhaul.

=== Multiple units under overhaul, repair or restoration ===
Number & name	Type	Builder	Photograph	Livery	Notes
Derby 999507 "Laboratory 20"	4WDR	D. Wickham & Co.		BR Derby Research Red & Blue	Built in 1959 for British Railways as DB 999507 "Track Recording Coach", later Derby 999507 "Laboratory 20". Withdrawn in 1991 and converted for passenger use on heritage railways until 2003. Brought to the North Dorset Railway from the Lavender Line in 2026 to undergo restoration in 2027.

=== Coaches ===
- MK1 BR M25424 Built 1957. Purchased by the Swanage Railway, but was sold to Shillingstone in 2011.

=== Wagons ===
- Senior Naval Stores Officer (SNSO), 10 ton 4w van, SNSO 535. Built in 1910 for the Admiralty initially at Chatham Dockyard, later at Gosport. Purchased from Gosport in March 1984 and moved to West Somerset Railway. In 2005 this van was donated to Shillingstone. Currently under restoration.
- Esso 4w Fuel Oil Tank 3957, Departmental No DB999088, Internal user number 083548. Ex Bournemouth West depot waste oil tanker then was bought by the Swanage railway, before moving to Shillingstone.
- L&NWR 4w Non-Vent 10 Ton Box Van, Diagram number 88, Navy number RNAD 335, ex RNAD Bedenham. Moved from Washford to Shillingstone Feb 2016. Currently under restoration.
- GWR 10t Ventilated Van 11451 (Code: MINK) Built by GWR at Swindon in 1901 on Lot 418 to Diagram V5. Moved from Washford to Shillingstone Feb 2016.
- BR Dogfish ballast wagon. B983184 moved to Shillingstone from Queenborough Rolling Mill in 2013. The Dogfish & Catfish were BR's standard small ballast hopper wagons, almost 2000 being built. Fitted with vacuum brakes from new, many lasted into the 1990s while a program to fit air-brakes to surviving Dogfish wagons was started in 2000. Despite this, the last examples of both types were withdrawn in 2006.
- BR ADB904131, 21 ton lowmac transporter wagon, GWR style riveted, Vacuum brake [Diag 2-245 Lot 2592, Built Swindon 1949.
- BR Standard Brake Van. Number : B950885. TOPS code : ZTO Built Faverdale, Darlington 1950. Currently being restored.

=== Former exhibits ===
- LMS 20 Ton Brake Van 950194 Scrapped on site.
- Ruston & Hornsby diesel shunter, arrived in 2007 at Shillingstone. 88DS class, works number 466629 Built 1962, supplied new to Ransomes Simms & Jeffries, of Ipswich. Sold to the Whitwell & Reepham Preservation Society 2013.
- Mk3a Ex-Virgin cross-country Open First buffet coach No.10224 built by British Rail in 1970 at their Derby works. The Mk 3 saw service with British Rail before joining the ranks of Virgin Trains rolling stock where it worked until retirement in 2002. It was then stored until 2005 and was used by the Army for bomb disposal training. Purchased for a nominal sum in May 2015, and moved shortly after to Shillingstone. Sold October 2017, and moved off site.
- BR Class 08 0-6-0 DE No. 08 995 was built at Horwich Works in October 1959 as number D3854, being renumbered 08 687 in February 1974. It was donated as part of a legacy and the trustees sold it off.
- BR 9F 2-10-0 92207, Built by BR (W) in Swindon "A" Shop during May 1959, 92207 was the 13th-from-last steam locomotive to be built for British Railways. It was part of lot number 429 (the final order for main line steam locomotives by British Rail). The owner removed it from site because of lack of appropriate workshop facilities.

== See also ==
- New Somerset and Dorset Railway
