= Oklahoma Railway Museum =

Museum in Oklahoma City, Oklahoma

- Former name: Central Oklahoma Railman Club
- Location: 3400 NE Grand Blvd, Oklahoma City, OK 73111, United States
- Coordinates: 35.505278°N 97.466667°W
- Type: Railway Museum
- Website: oklahomarailwaymuseum.org

The Oklahoma Railway Museum is a 501(c)(3) tax exempt non-profit organization in Oklahoma City. It is self-funded through memberships, train fares, special events, donations, and grants for restoration projects. The growing membership, of approximately 210 members, has around 50 active members. Railroad operations are conducted under Federal Railroad Administration (FRA) rules, and the Museum is a member of the HeritageRail Alliance, Frontier Country Tourism, and an associate member of the Adventure District of Oklahoma City.

== Operations ==
The museum operates four diesel locomotives and has a full assortment of railcars. Actual train rides are done every first and third Saturday of each month from April to September, typically at 9:15 am, 11:15 am, 1:15 pm and 3:15 pm. Special annual events also occur, such as the Halloween Train, the Easter Express, and the Polar Express around Christmastime.

== Rolling stock ==
The museum has 10 diesel and steam locomotive engines, 10 passenger cars, numerous maintenance of way and freight equipment from many different roads. Starting October 16, 2021, they have an operating "guest" steam engine "Sadie" sn 4139 for the October train rides. She was built in 1931 at the Vulcan Iron Works in Wilkes-Barre, PA. It is slated to remain through the spring of 2022.

=== Locomotives ===
Locomotive details
Number	Image	Type	Model	Built	Builder	Status
643		Steam	2-8-0	1879	Hinkley Locomotive Works	Display
5		Steam	S100	1942	Porter	Display
301		Diesel	45-ton switcher	1941	GE Transportation	Operational
743		Diesel	RS-1	1943	ALCO	Display
2571		Diesel	CF7	1949, rebuilt 1972	Electro-Motive Diesel, rebuilt by Santa Fe	Awaiting repairs
400		Diesel	25-ton switcher	1950	GE Transportation	Awaiting restoration
48		Diesel	SW8	1952	Electro-Motive Diesel	Operational
1		Diesel	GP10	1954, rebuilt 1967	Electro-Motive Diesel, rebuilt by Illinois Central	Stored
615		Diesel	SW1200	1954	Electro-Motive Diesel	Operational
814		Diesel	F9	1954	Electro-Motive Diesel	Operable
2		Diesel	RS-3	1955	ALCO	Display, awaiting restoration
5990		Diesel	FP45	1967	Electro-Motive Diesel	Display

== Events ==
The Oklahoma Railway Museum hosts several events throughout the year. In addition to "Day Out With Thomas," they have a Halloween Train and Christmas Train. They have several venues to host birthday parties. Charter trains are also offered.
