= GE 25-ton switcher =

Type of switcher locomotive produced by General Electric

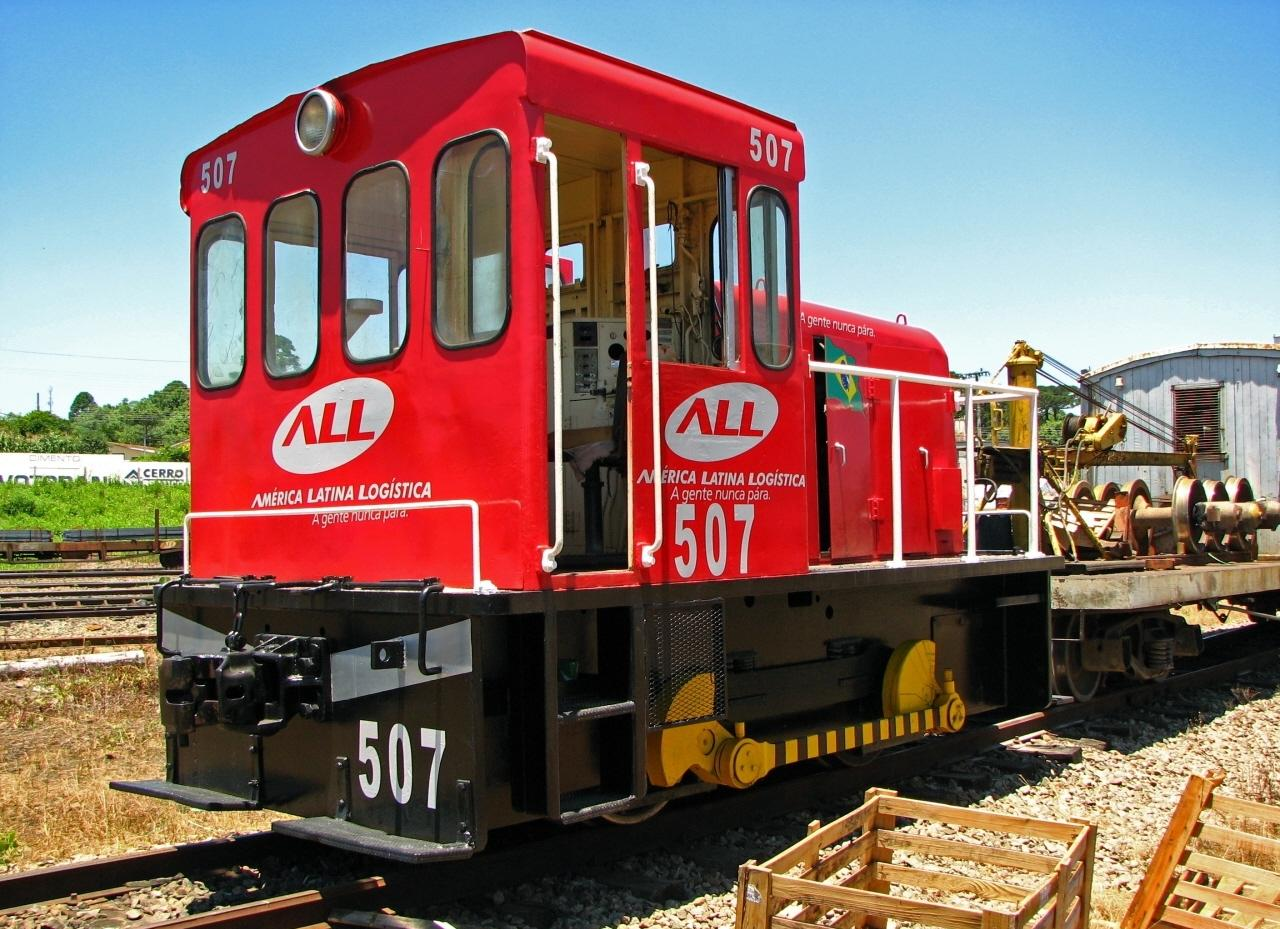
- A GE 25-ton switcher in Brazil. This example has been converted to meter-gauge.
Type and origin
- Power type: Diesel-electric
- Builder: GE Transportation Systems
- Model: 25-ton switcher
- Build date: 1941–1974
- Total produced: ~550
Specifications
- Configuration
  - Whyte: 0-4-0DE
  - AAR: B
  - UIC: B
- Gauge: 4 ft 8 1/2 in (1,435 mm) standard gauge
- Wheel diameter: 33 or 34 inches (838 or 864 mm)
- Minimum curve: 40 ft (12.19 m)
- Length
  - Over couplers: 18 ft 2 in (5.54 m)
  - Over body: 16 ft 0.5 in (4,890 mm)
- Width: 8 ft 5.5 in (2,578 mm)
- Height: 10 ft 7.375 in (3,235 mm)
- Loco weight: 25 short tons (22 long tons; 23 t)
- Fuel type: Diesel
- Fuel capacity: 75 US gal (280 L; 62 imp gal)
- Lubricant cap.: 5 US gal (19 L; 4.2 imp gal)
- Coolant cap.: 11 US gal (42 L; 9.2 imp gal)
- Sandbox cap.: 5 cu ft (0.14 m^{3})
- Prime mover: Cummins HBI-600
- Displacement: 672 cu in (11.01 L)
- Generator: General Electric GT-1503
- Traction motors: General Electric GE-733
  - Continuous: 349 amperes
- Cylinders: 6
- Cylinder size: 4.875 in × 6 in (123.8 mm × 152.4 mm)
- Gear ratio: 19.1:1 Double reduction
Performance figures
- Maximum speed: 20 mph (32 km/h)
- Power output: 150 hp (110 kW)
- Tractive effort: 15,000 lbf (67 kN)
- Factor of adh.: 30%
Career
- Operators: United States Armed Forces, many industrial customers, some railroads
- Nicknames: Critter
- Locale: North America, South America, Africa, Europe, Central America, India, Pakistan, Philippines, Saudi Arabia
- Disposition: Many retired and scrapped, some in service, a few preserved in museums
- Statistics sourced from

The GE 25-ton switcher (also known as a 25-tonner) is a model of diesel-electric switcher locomotive that was produced by GE Transportation at their Erie, Pennsylvania, facility between 1941 and 1974. Most examples were produced for industrial customers or the United States Armed Forces, although a number of examples were purchased by freight railroads as well. The majority of production was for customers in the United States and Canada, but export models were produced for buyers on five continents. Production totaled approximately 550 units over 33 years, making it one of the most widely produced switchers in American history.

The small size, low top speed (20 mph or 32 km/h) and low power output (150 hp or 110 kW) of the locomotive made it unsuitable for much beyond switching duties. GE specifically marketed the locomotive as an industrial switcher with a low cost. Many 25-tonners operated for decades, and into the 21st century. A number have been preserved at museums, where some continue to perform switching duties.

== Design and production ==
=== Design ===
The 25-ton switcher was designed primarily for switching duties (moving railroad cars to and from loading/unloading facilities, as well as making up and breaking down trains), with both low power output and low top speed for a locomotive. While not very capable of hauling mainline trains, these features made it cheaper than most other locomotives. For rail-served industries, military installations, and other customers who only needed locomotives for switching and could rely on railroad companies to haul their trains elsewhere, this made it an attractive purchase, and GE specifically marketed the locomotive towards such customers. GE claimed in advertising that the locomotive could reduce the time needed to switch cars by 50 percent, with an availability rating of 97.7 percent – figures which far exceeded those of maintenance-heavy steam locomotives. The 25-tonner's small size also allowed it to fit in places where larger locomotives could not, an asset in industrial facilities and yards where clearances were often low.

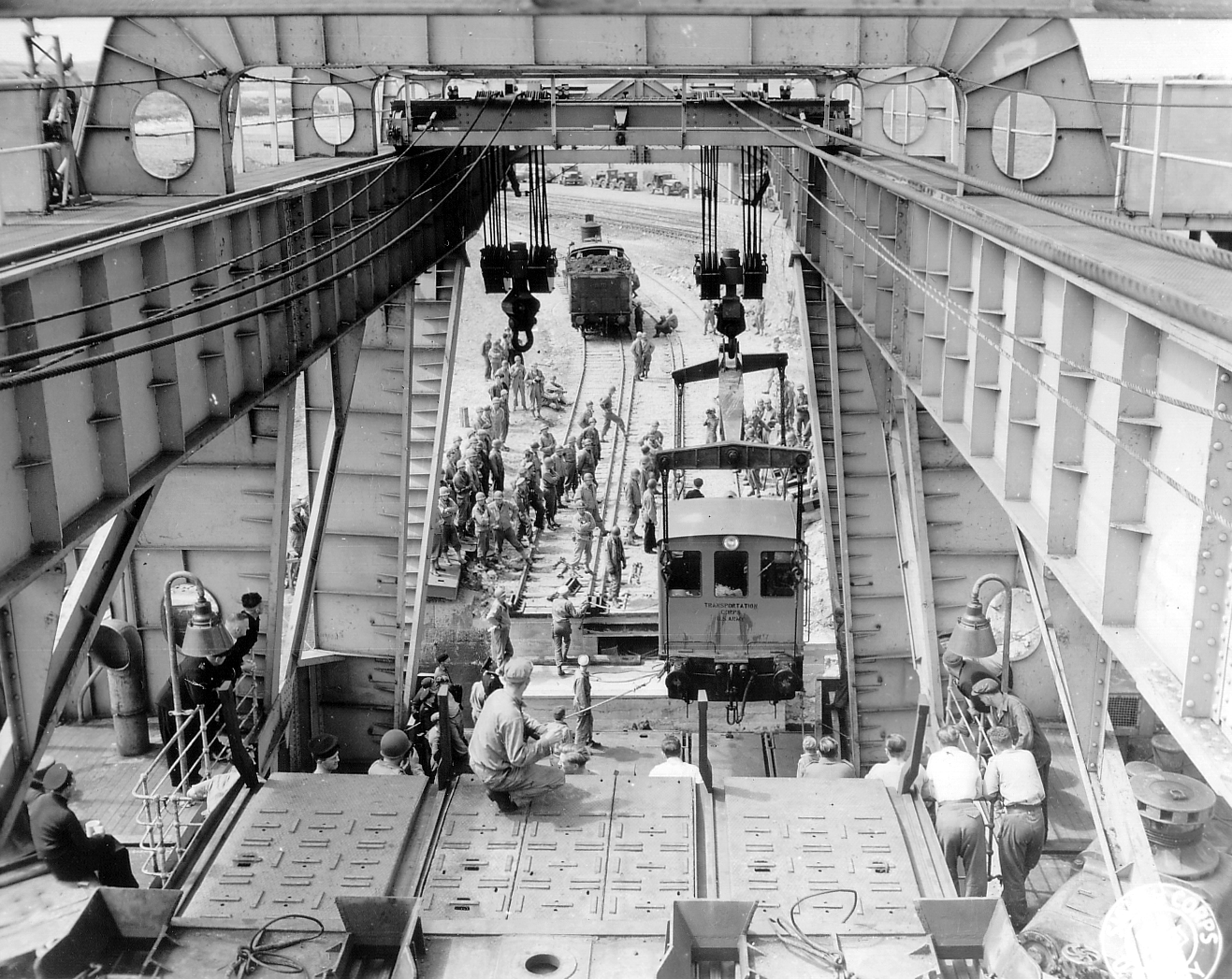
A United States Army 25-tonner being unloaded in France in 1944

The locomotive was designed as a hood unit to improve visibility for the engineer, essential for switching duties. Power was generated using a 6-cylinder Cummins HBI-600 diesel engine producing 150 hp (110 kW) at 1,800 rpm. This engine powered a single GE GT-1503 main generator, which in turn provided electricity to the single rear-mounted GE-733 traction motor which powered the rear axle. Power was provided to the forward axle using a chain drive. The unusual chain drive system for a locomotive was part of the reason for its top speed being limited to 20 mph (32 km/h).

While most examples were built in 4 ft 8 1/2 in (1,435 mm) standard gauge, GE produced models anywhere between 3 ft (914 mm) gauge and standard gauge. Some 25-tonners were built to meter-gauge and exported to Brazil.

=== Production ===
Throughout the locomotive's long production history, minor changes were made to its shape and the location of features, such as the bell, exhaust pipe, and lights. Otherwise, the fundamental design was largely unchanged throughout the entirety of the locomotive's 33 year production history. Towards the end of production, GE added an independent axle suspension to new 25-tonners, a feature shared with the GE 35-ton switcher. Many customers made modifications to their 25-tonners after purchase, ranging from minor changes such as moving the bell to completely replacing the prime mover and adding an independent brake.

When the final unit was built in 1974, production totaled approximately 550 locomotives, making the design one of GE's most built locomotive models. While the majority of production was for customers in the United States or Canada, 25-tonners were built for customers in North and South America, Europe, Asia, and Africa.

== Operating history ==
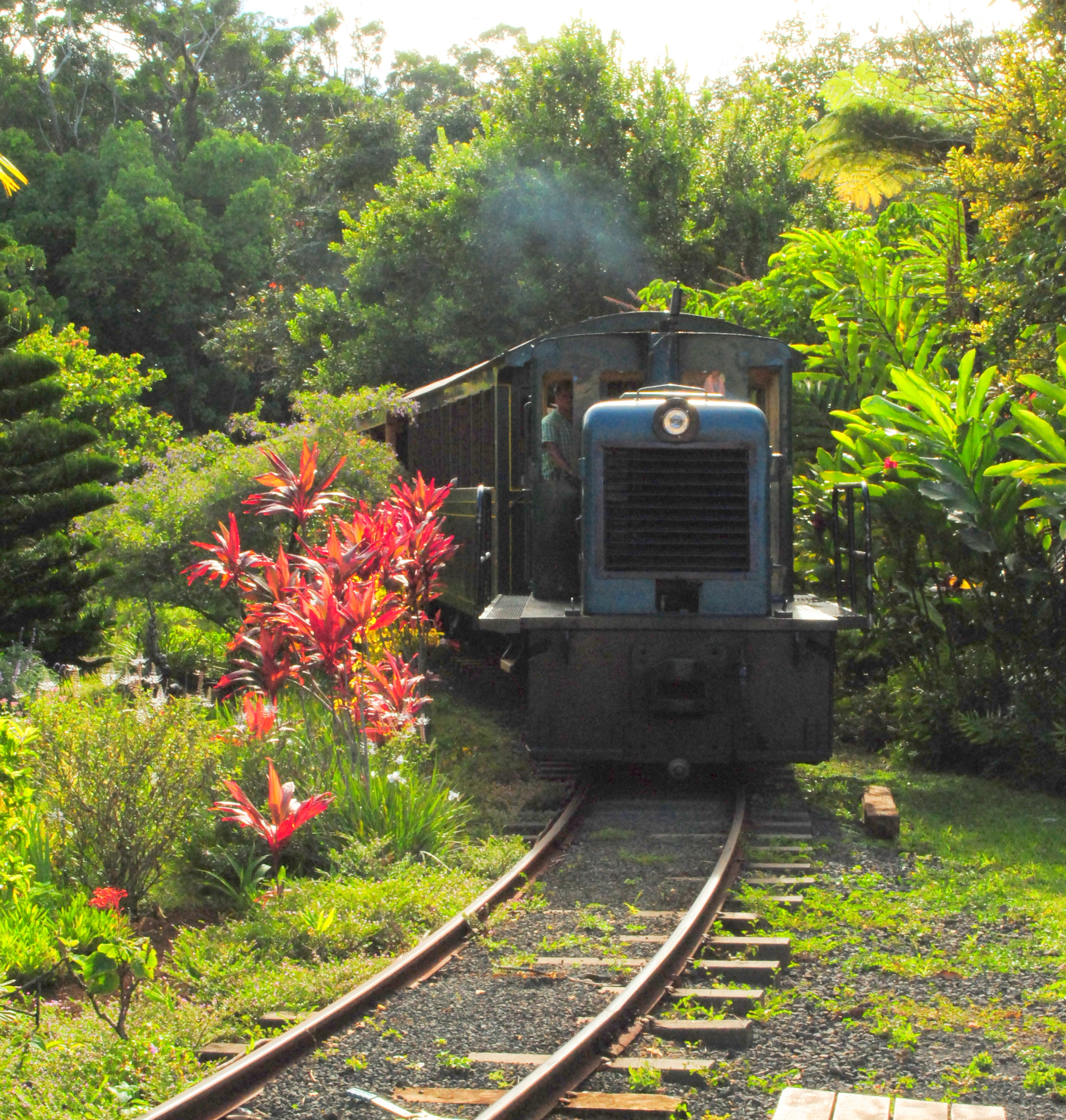
A 25-tonner in operation at the Kauai Plantation Railway

25-ton switchers were for many years a very common site at rail-served industries in need of small, cheap locomotives capable of switching cars around the many sidings found on their properties. Some examples of users include grain elevators, U.S. military facilities, steel mills, and commuter railroads.

The 25-tonners have been nicknamed "critters" by operators and railfans alike, due to their small size. This nickname is shared with similar GE products such as the closely related 23-ton switcher.

Starting in the 1970s, most 25-ton switchers were gradually replaced, either by more powerful and modern switcher locomotives, or by railcar movers. Many railcar movers can also travel on roads for additional flexibility, unlike the 25-tonner. A number of 25-tonners continued to operate into the 21st century, a testament to their durability. Some have found a second life at railroad museums, where they are used to move equipment.

== Modeling ==
PIKO manufactures a G scale model of the 25-tonner. Manufacturer Grandt Line also produces 25-tonner models in HO scale.

== Preservation ==
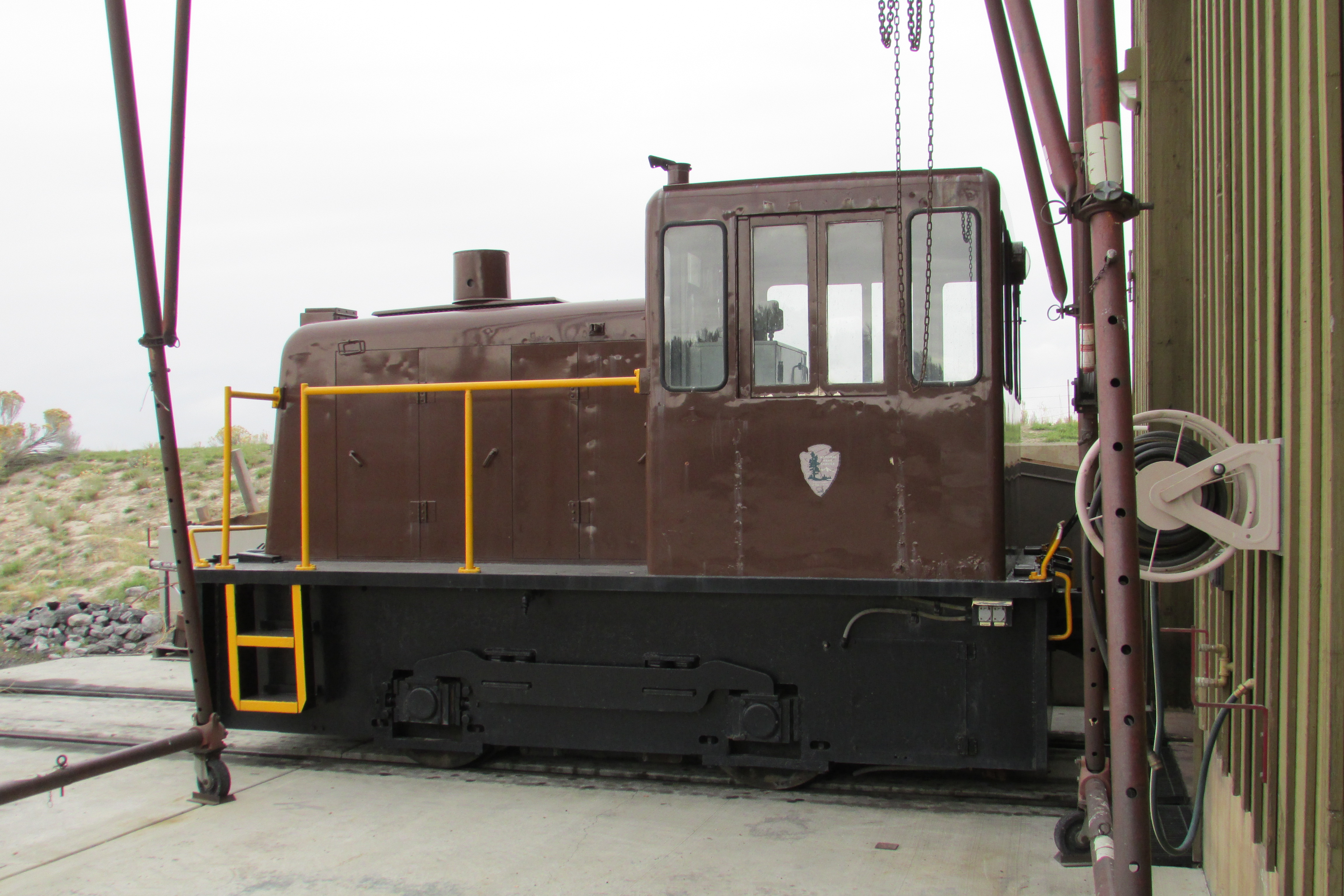
Golden Spike National Historical Park's 25 tonner

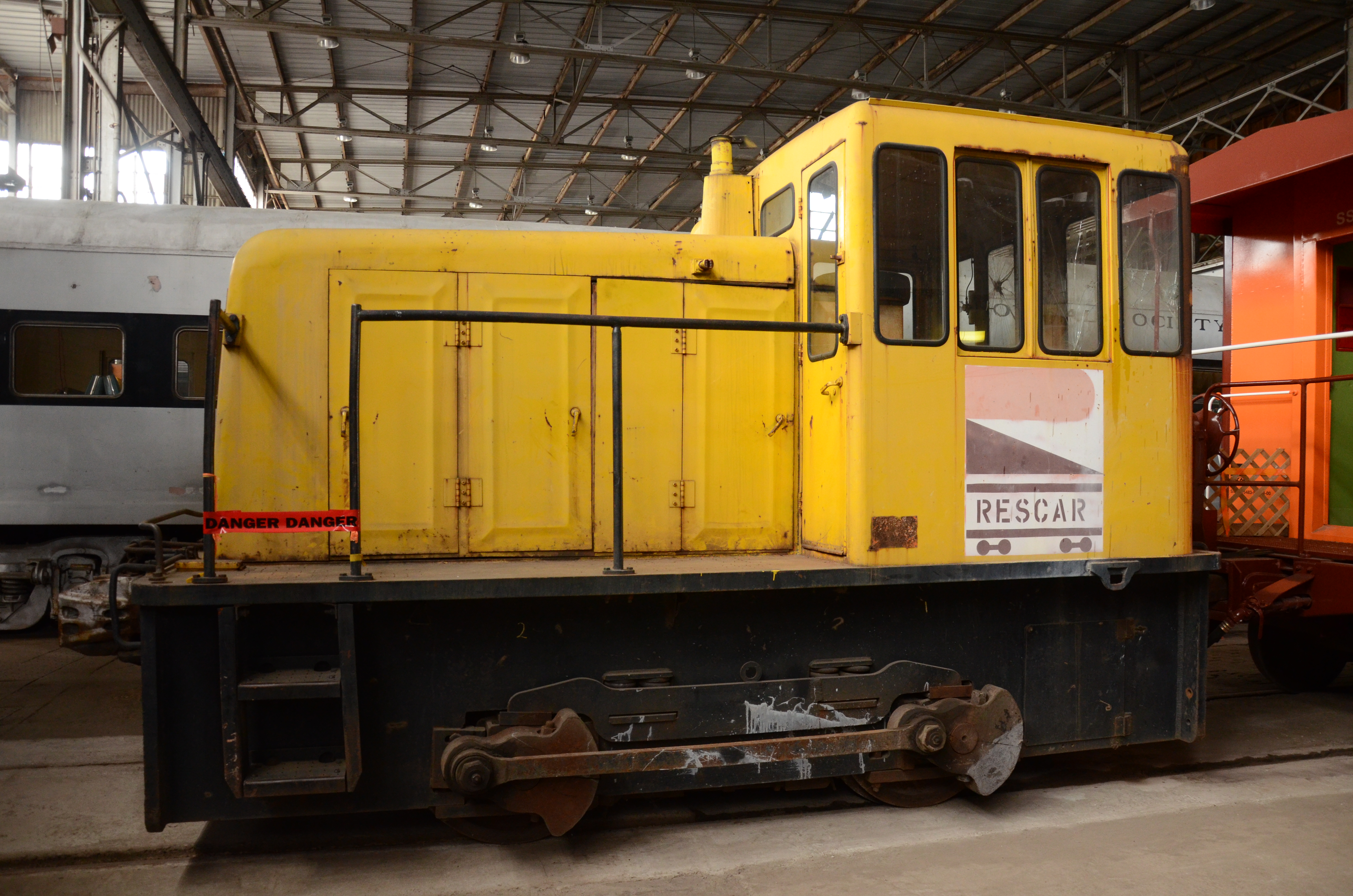
Central Texas Gravel Locomotive #210

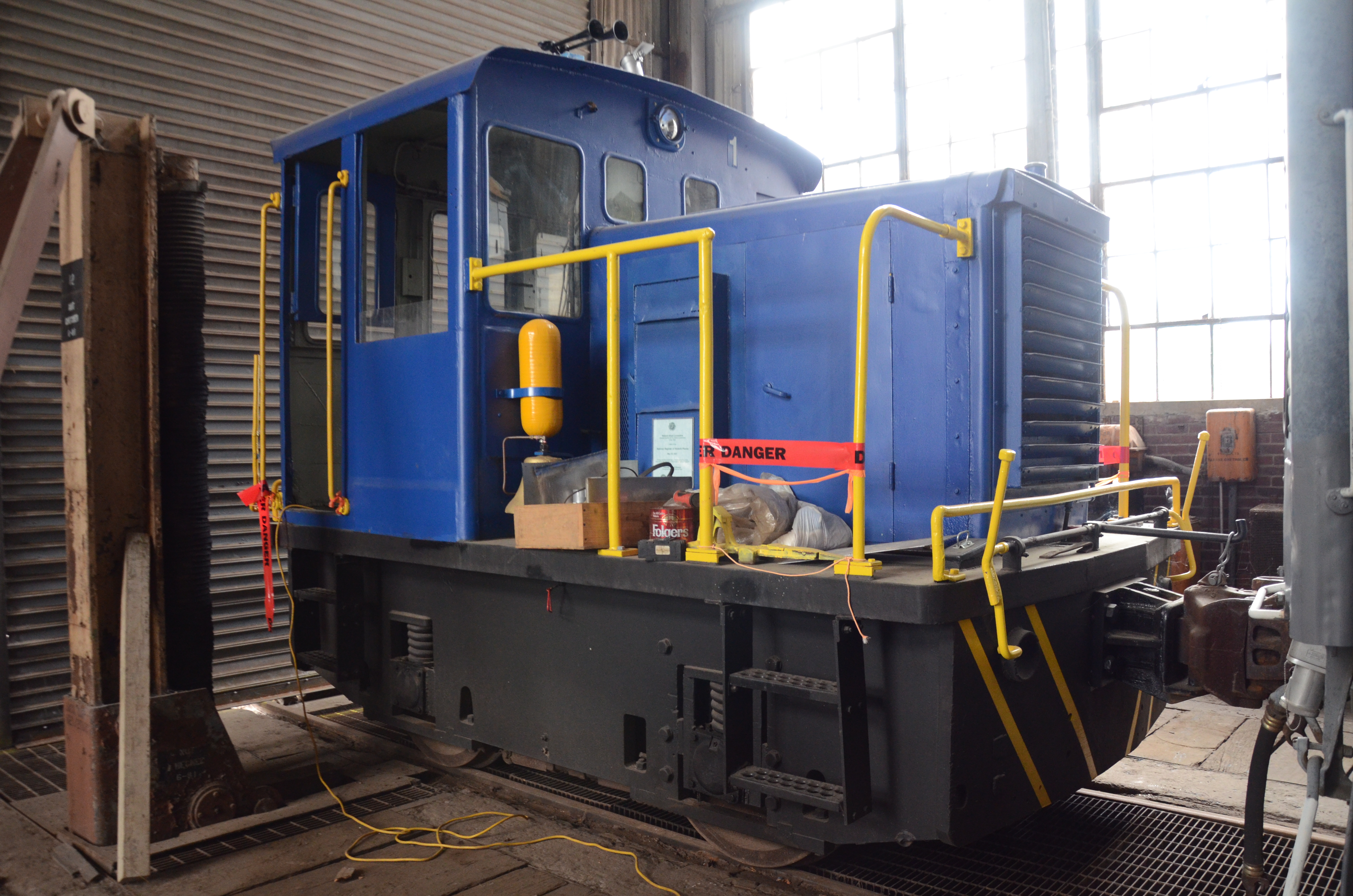
Wabash Alloys Locomotive

A number of 25-tonners have been preserved at museums, and some have been restored to operating condition.

- The Oklahoma Railway Museum owns former MKT #400, which is undergoing restoration to operating condition.
- The Railroad Museum of Long Island owns former Long Island Rail Road #399, which is in operating condition and has been cosmetically restored.
- Golden Spike National Historical Park uses a 25-tonner to move its replicas of Jupiter and Union Pacific No. 119 when they are not under their own power.
- The Nevada Southern Railroad Museum owns locomotive L-2, which served at the Nevada Test Site during the 1960s.
- The Phillipsburg Railroad Historians own a 25-tonner which previously served at an Alstom plant in Easton, PA.
- The C.P.R. Station Heritage Park and Interpretive Centre in Portage la Prairie has a 25-tonner on display, formerly of Manitoba Hydro.
- The Steam Railroading Institute owns a 25-tonner nicknamed "Mighty Mouse" that is in operating condition, formerly operated at a grain elevator.
- The Illinois Railway Museum owns a 1942-vintage 25-tonner in operating condition that worked at cement plants for 78 years prior to being donated to the museum in 2020.
- Central Texas Gravel Locomotive No. 210 is preserved at the Arkansas Railroad Museum and is listed on the National Register of Historic Places. It was built in 1956, and is a well-preserved example of the second generation locomotives, a popular model used widely in freight yards throughout the nation and internationally. This model was first used by the Central Texas Gravel Company, and then by the Gifford-Hill Company, which operated it at yards in Shreveport, Louisiana and Eagle Hill, Arkansas. The locomotive was acquired by the museum in 2005, with plans to use it for moving rolling stock within its facilities.
- The Arkansas Railroad Museum also owns a former Wabash Alloys Locomotive, which is also listed on the NRHP. Built in 1940–43, little is known about its early life, but from around 1970, it worked at Wabash Alloys, a producer of aluminum alloys, at Haskell, Arkansas. It eventually became surplus to the company's needs and they donated it on March 8, 2003. With 150 hp (112 kW) and 15,000 lbf (67 kN) of tractive effort, it could pull half a dozen loaded cars on the level. Although the Arkansas nomination document asserts that "large Class I railroads would have used them for switching on light branch lines," standard freight cars of the time were up to 70 tons (64t) gross weight, or 17.5 tons (16t) per axle, so there was little need for 12.5 ton (11t) per axle locomotives on railroads, even on light branch lines, but GE built hundreds of them for industrial users.
- The Pennsylvania Trolley Museum owns operable 25-tonner No. 89 which has been converted to 5 ft 2 1/2 in (1,588 mm) Pennsylvania Trolley Gauge.
- The Niagara Railway Museum in Fort Erie, Ontario owns an operational 25-tonner built in 1948.
- Port Stanley Terminal Rail in Port Stanley, Ontario operates 1952 built 25-tonner L1, named Stanley.
- The Seashore Trolley Museum acquired ex-Providence and Worcester Railroad No. 150 in 2020; the unit was built in late 1945. The locomotive sees active use switching various locations on the museum's property.
- The Fox River Trolley Museum owns ex-Chicago Transit Authority no. MS-65; the unit was built in September 1942. The locomotive sees regular use for switching the museum's many ex-CTA cars, since the MS-65 has CTA-type MU couplers. The MS-65 was declared surplus by the CTA and donated to the museum in 2020.

== See also ==
- GE 44-ton switcher
- GE 45-ton switcher
- List of GE locomotives
