= JŽ class 62 =

Class of Yugoslavian steam locomotives

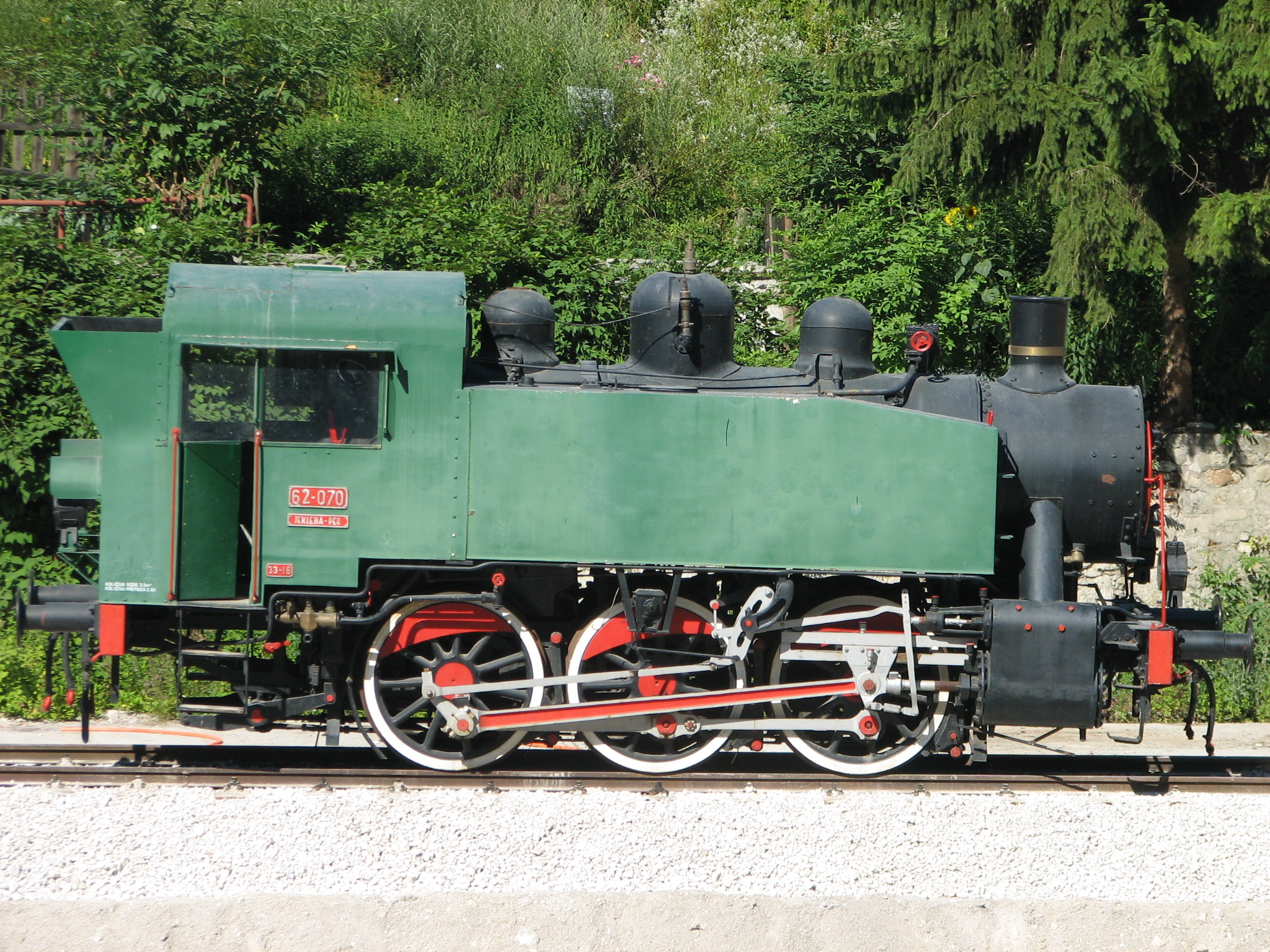
- Ex-USATC 6171 No. 62-070, which served the Zagorje coal mine
Type and origin
- Power type: Steam
- Builder: Đuro Đaković (90)
- Build date: 1952–61 (Yugoslavian-built engines)
- Total produced: 90 (Yugoslavian-built engines)
Specifications
- Configuration
  - Whyte: 0-6-0T
  - UIC: C nt
- Gauge: 4 ft 8 1/2 in (1,435 mm) standard gauge
Career
- Operators: Yugoslav Railways
- Number in class: 196 (106 ex-USATC, 90 newly-built)
- Disposition: Many scrapped. At least 70 either preserved or derelict (including four preserved overseas), including 21 ex-USATC examples.

The Jugoslovenske Železnice (JŽ; Yugoslavian Railways) class 62 was a class formed of 106 ex–United States Army Transportation Corps S100 Class 0-6-0T steam locomotives, purchased surplus after the Second World War, plus about 90 similar examples built by Đuro Đaković of Slavonski Brod, Croatia, between 1952 and 1961.

These Yugoslav-built examples differ in minor details, but principally the use of plate frames instead of bar frames, resulting in a higher boiler pitch. This in turn leads to distinct shoulder on the steam pipes (the American-built examples having straight steam pipes) and smaller domes which have a flat top so they are not higher than the cab roof.

== Preservation ==
Several examples of both the original S100 base design and the Yugoslav-built derivative survive throughout the former nation as well as further abroad. Notable examples include 62-669, built in 1960, which had been bought by a preservation group in England, who had it modified to resemble a Southern Railway USA class, being renumbered as 30075, one higher than the last British Railways example. The engine has since been joined by 62-521, which had become 30076. Two examples were purchased by Marineland of Canada for operation in their park, but ultimately remained stored until donated to the Niagara Railway Museum.

Notable preserved examples:

- 62-669 (built 1960) North Dorset Railway "30075"
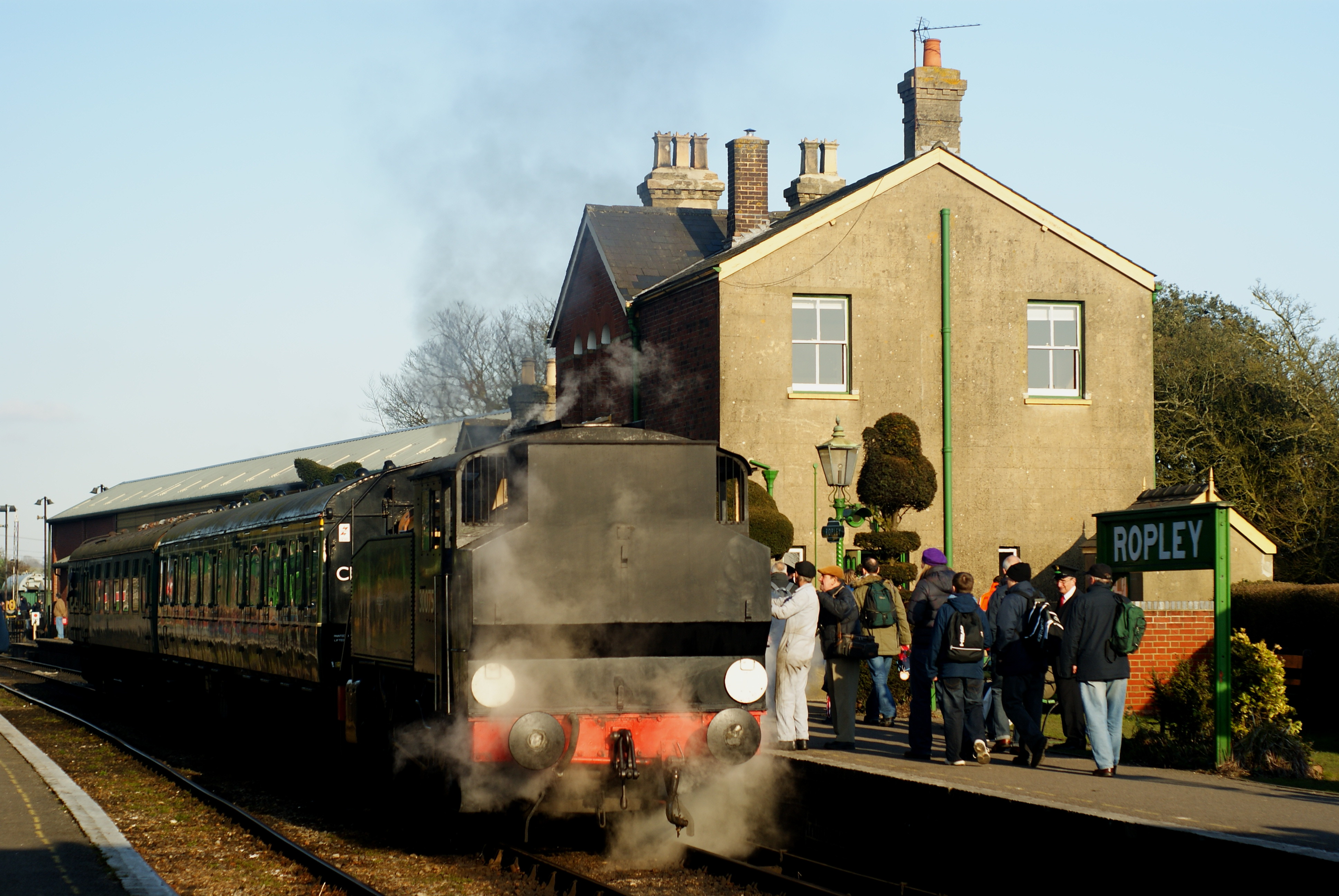
  JŽ class 62 62-669 as "30075"
- 62-521 (built 1954) North Dorset Railway "30076"
- 62-118 (built 1955) Niagara Railway Museum
- 62-129 (built 1958) Niagara Railway Museum
