= Fairmont Railway Motors =

Railway company

- Industry: rail transport
- Founded: 1909 in Fairmont, Minnesota, United States
- Founder: Frank E. Wade
- Defunct: 1979
- Successor: Harsco Track Technologies
- Products: railway speeders

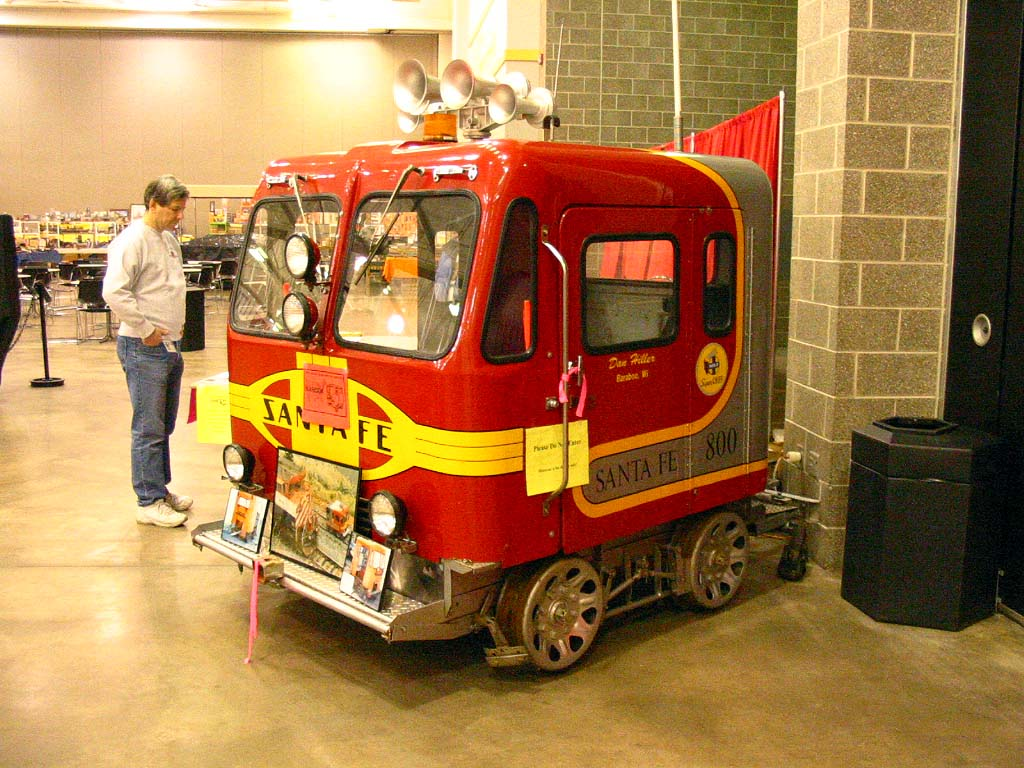
Fairmont MT-14 speeder in February 2004

In 1909 Frank E. Wade founded Fairmont Railway Motors of Fairmont, Minnesota (renamed the Fairmont Gas Engine and Railway Motor Car Company in 1915), was a manufacturer of rail vehicles formed from the Fairmont Machine Company. In 1928 the company acquired Mudge and Company and in 1955, the railcar interests of the Fairbanks-Morse company (which had purchased the Sheffield company in the 1920s). Fairmont merged with Harsco Corporation in 1979 to become part of Harsco Track Technologies (Harsco Rail in 2009). Fairmont products included:

- internal combustion engines such as the PHB and QB models
- maintenance of way vehicles such as speeders, small derrick cars,
- small shipping vehicles such as combination platform cars, etc.

External media

Images
- platform car at the Denver Federal Center museum
- image of plant buildings

Video
- Wooden motorcar with 2-stroke engine
