= Pettibone (company) =

Material handling equipment manufacturer in Michigan

Pettibone Corp.
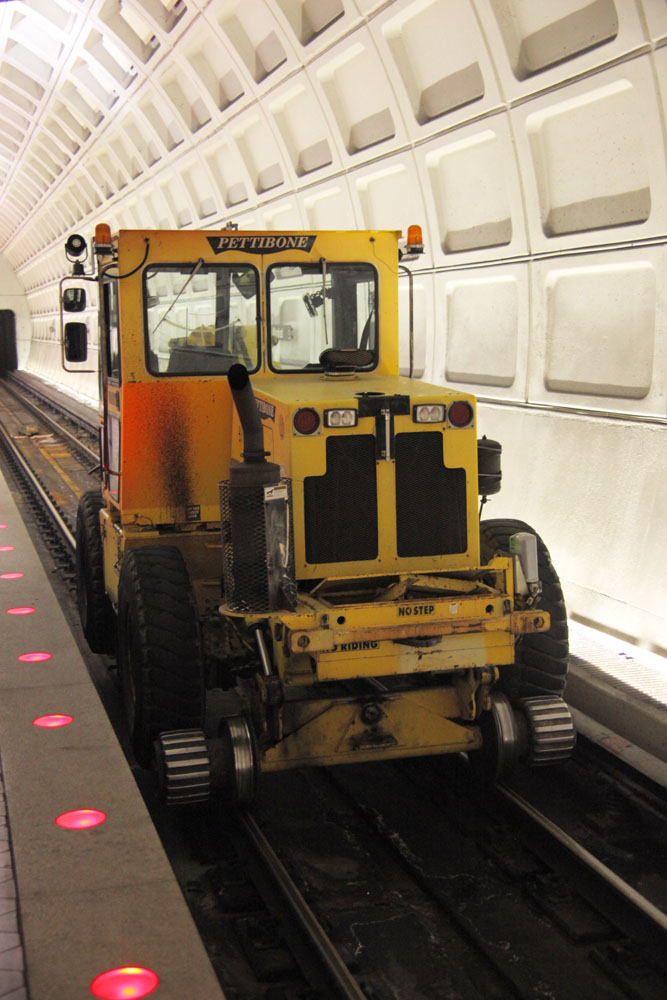
- A Pettibone crane at Eastern Market station in the D.C. Metro.
- Formerly: Pettibone Mulliken
- Industry: Railroad equipment, material handling equipment
- Founded: 1881
- Founder: Alfred H. Mulliken
- Headquarters: Baraga, Michigan
- Area served: North America

Pettibone, founded as Pettibone Mulliken, is a manufacturer of material handling equipment based in Baraga, Michigan. The company started doing business in 1881, and manufactures various cranes and other material handling vehicles, many designed specifically for railroad use.

== History ==
Pettibone Mulliken was founded in 1881 in Chicago, Illinois with Alfred H. Mulliken as president. Initially, the company's biggest product was railroad track and switch equipment.

By 1929, the company's manufacturing facilities in Chicago occupied 32 acres.

While primarily a manufacturer of cranes and other material handling equipment, the company received a $3,817,844 contract for artillery material from the United States Department of War in 1940, on the eve of U.S. entry into World War II. During the war, the company continued to manufacture artillery for the United States Armed Forces.

== Pettibone today ==
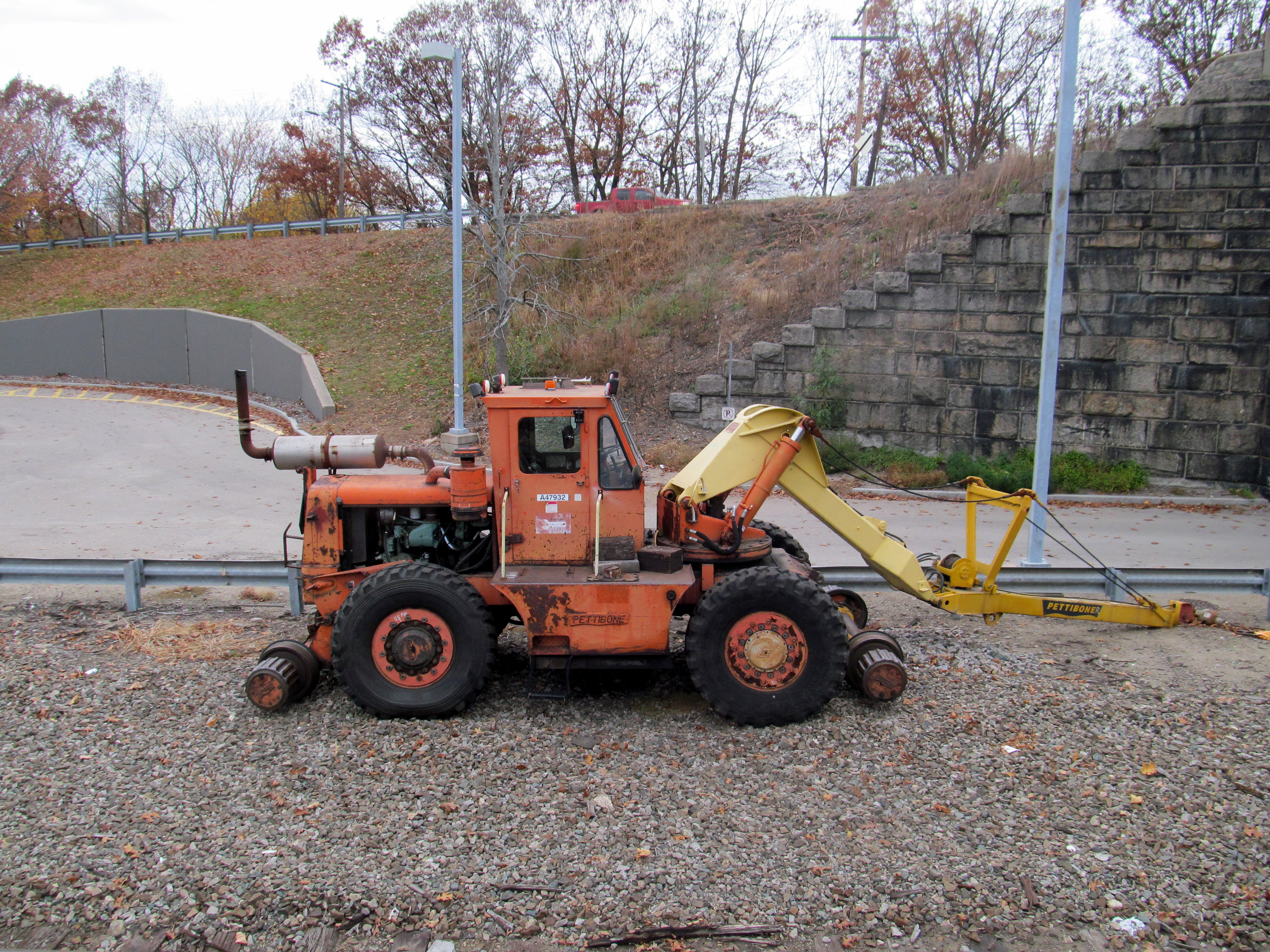
A Pettibone crane owned by Amtrak seen at Readville station, November 2015.

Today, the company is known simply as Pettibone. It primarily manufactures cranes and other material handling equipment, some of which is still sold specifically for the rail industry.

Pettibone is most known for its cranes, manufactured under the Speed Swing line. Pettibone cranes are used by railroads for a variety of applications, including lifting rails and moving ties.
