= John Owen Pettibone =

American politician

John Owen Pettibone (October 22, 1787 – August 19, 1876) was an American politician.

Pettibone was born in Simsbury, Connecticut. He graduated from Yale College in 1805, at the age of 18. He had spent his life in Simsbury, highly respected and honored. He had repeatedly been a member of both houses of the Connecticut State Legislature.

Pettibone died at Simsbury, Aug. 19, 1876, at the age of 89.
