= Boyne City Railroad =

Railway based at Boyne City, Michigan

Overview
- Headquarters: Boyne City, Michigan
- Reporting mark: BCRR
- Locale: Boyne City, Michigan
- Dates of operation: 1893–1978

Technical
- Track gauge: 4 ft 8 1/2 in (1,435 mm) standard gauge
- Length: 7.2 miles

The Boyne City Railroad (reporting mark BCRR) was a railway based at Boyne City, Michigan, U.S., during 1893–1978.

== Early history ==
William Howard White 1915

The original railroad was established by William Howard White of Boyne City, Michigan in 1893. William H. White was a northern Michigan industrialist who owned the W.H. White Company. The company operated saw mills in Boyne City, the White Transportation Steamship Company with service to Chicago, Buffalo, Georgian Bay, Ontario and Boyne City, a commercial dock on Lake Charlevoix and controlled extensive timberlands around Boyne Falls. The company needed an economical way to supply the lumber camps and haul the cut timber to the saw mills located in Boyne City. In addition, the White Transportation Steamship Company wanted to compete with the steamship lines that docked at the Port of Petoskey. A railroad intersecting the Grand Rapids & Indiana Main Line at Boyne Falls with service to the Boyne City would make the commercial docks at Boyne City more competitive. A railroad controlled by the W.H. White Company was the solution.

== Boyne City Southeastern Railroad ==
In 1893, the W.H. White Lumber Company established the Boyne City Southeastern Railroad to access the company timber holding around Boyne Falls. Mile 0 started at the White Lumber Dock in Boyne City and proceeded 7.2 miles (11.6 km) east to Boyne Falls where it intersected the mainline of the Grand Rapids & Indiana Railroad. From Boyne Falls, the Thumb Lake Branch Line was built to access the company timber around Thumb Lake. The railroad was built 1-mile (1.6 km) north along the GR&I to Easton (Thumb Lake Road & US Hwy 131) and then east (7 miles) to Thumb Lake. The W.H. White Company established logging camps 1 through 3 in the area.

== Boyne City Gaylord & Alpena ==
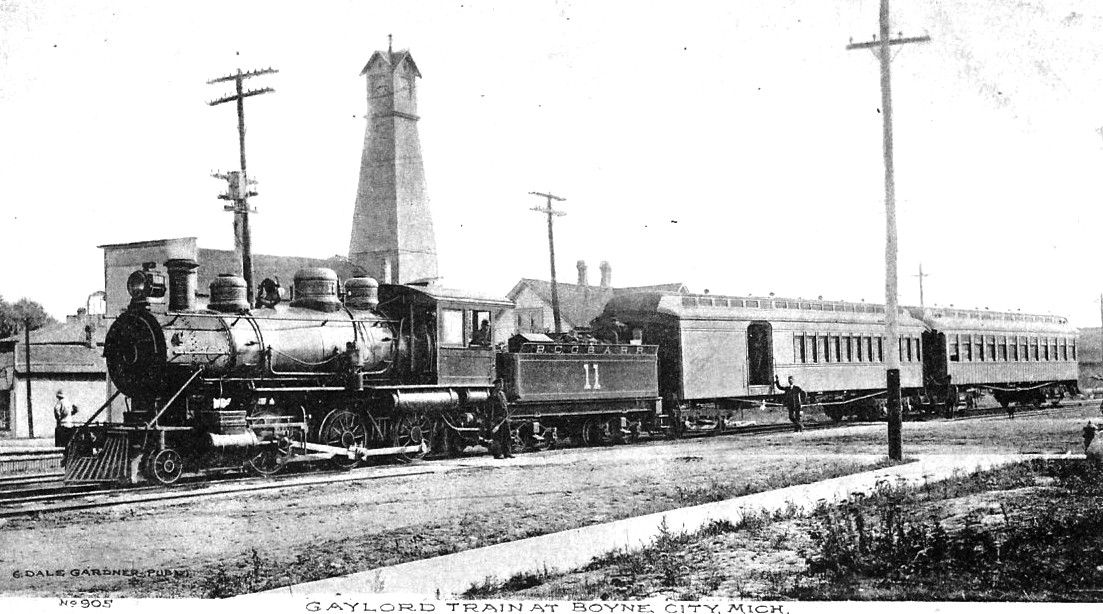
Boyne City train in 1905.

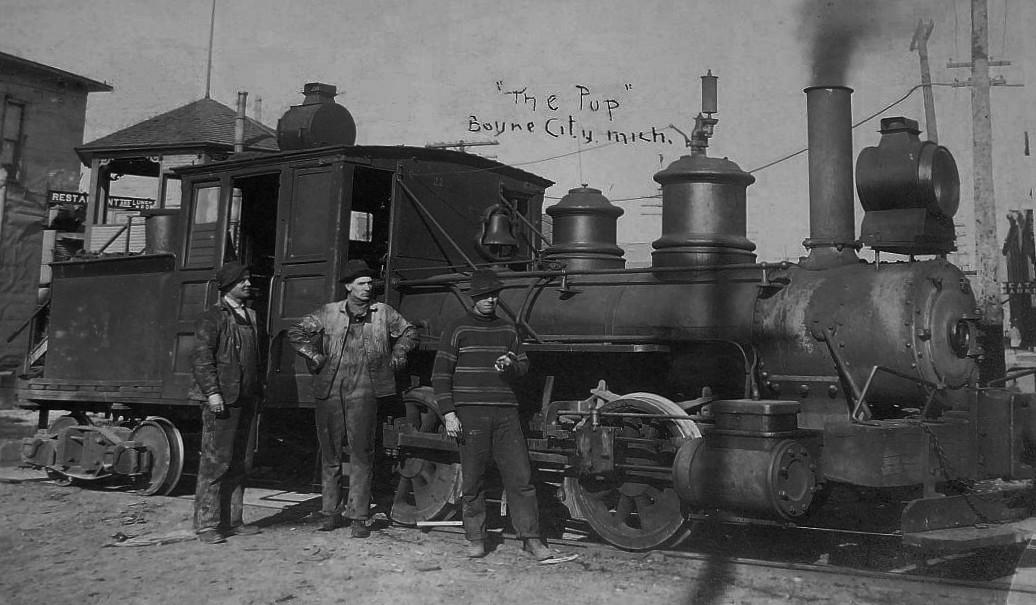
"The Pup" locomotive of the B.C.G & A in 1911.

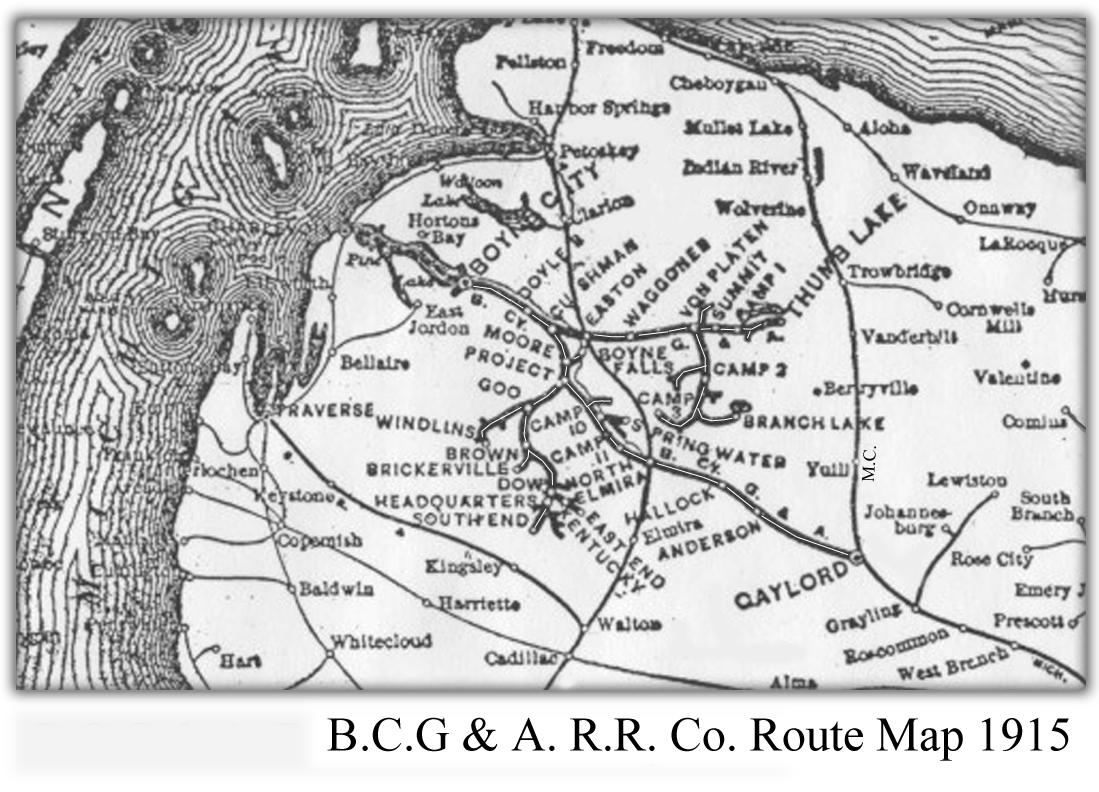
B.C.G & A Railroad Route Map 1915.

BCG&A Logo 1921, The White Road refers to W.H. White, the owner and president of the railroad.

On March 28, 1905, the Boyne City, Gaylord & Alpena Railroad Company was incorporated and became the successor to the Boyne City & Southeastern Railroad. It was proposed that the railroad would eventually reach Alpena on Lake Huron, 62 miles (100 km) to the east. On November 25, 1905, the railroad reached the town of Gaylord where it intersected the Michigan Central Main Line, 26 miles (42 km) east of Boyne City. After reaching Gaylord, the W.H. White Company continued to harvest the timber along the B.C.G.&A. right-of-way. In addition, the Southend Branch Line was built between 1908 and 1912 from the railroad junction named Project (the current parking lot of Boyne Mountain Resort) to the Upper Jordan River Valley (south of M-32) to harvest the W.H. White Company’s timberland in the valley.

In November 1913, the Michigan Trust Co. of Grand Rapids, MI was appointed receiver of the W.H. White Company and the B.C.G. & A Railroad since the companies had missed all mortgage payments in the previous quarter. Liabilities of the combined companies were stated at roughly $2 million with no mention of asset value.

By 1915, the railroad operated 35 miles (56 km) of main line track, 57.8 miles (93.0 km) of branch lines, 7.2 miles (11.6 km) of siding, 12 locomotives, 305 cars (mostly Russel Log Cars) and car repair shops in Boyne City. The 1915-1916 fiscal year revenue for the B.C.G&A. was: gross earnings $263,753, net earnings $185,038, interest expense ($32,559) and net income $46,595. 86% of the revenue was from freight traffic. In 1915, the officers of the company were W.H. White, President & General Manager; Thomas White, V-P & Assistant General Manager; W.L. Martin, Secretary; J.M. Tompkins, Auditor & Purchasing Agent; all of Boyne City; James A. White, Treasurer, Buffalo, NY. The 1915 directors of the company were: William H. White, Thomas White, L.H. White, W.L. Marin, J.M. Harris, J.T. Wylie. In late 1916, the B.C.G & A was stalled 9 miles (14 km) from Alpena, MI at the Thunder Bay River since the company had run out of money.

In February 1917, the Michigan Trust Company, Grand Rapids, MI announced a tentative reorganization plan in which the B.C.G&A would issue $800,000 in 20 year bonds paying 5%. The bonds would have first lien on the line as projected from Boyne City to Alpena. The $800,000 would be issued as follows: $195,000 to the previous bond holders and other debt holders, $330,000 to the Michigan Trust Company (receiver) in payment of receivers claims and $275,000 sold for cash to provide funds to complete the line to Alpena, MI. As a caveat, Michigan Trust Company required that all earnings in excess of expenses including interest be deposit annual by March 1. In addition, the Michigan Trust Company required principal and interest guarantees from William H., Thomas White and James White. This was accomplished by the brothers by pledging all their capital stock in the B.C.G & A Railroad Company. In August 1917, the Michigan Bankruptcy Court and the Michigan Railroad Commission approved the plan.

On December 20, 1918, the BCG&A reached Alpena, Michigan on Lake Huron where it intersected the Detroit and Mackinac Railway main line. The expanded BCG&A offered service to Charlevoix County, Antrim County, Otsego County, Montmorency County, and Alpena County. The BCG&A operated 90 miles (140 km) of main line track, 3 branch lines had over 300 Russel Log Cars, 13 locomotives, 12 passenger cars and 1 interurban gasoline passenger car. By this time, the W.H. White Company had 4 saw mills in Boyne City with a combined capacity of 200,000 board feet (470 m^{3}) of lumber. In addition, the Iron & Chemical Company and the Michigan Tanning & Extract Company required a constant source of hardwood timber that the BCG&A could deliver.

The extension of the BCG&A was an attempt to maximize the land holdings of the W.H. White Company. The railroad was necessary to harvest the timber that the W.H. White Company owned east of Gaylord. In addition, after the timber was harvested, the land was near-worthless without settlers. So, the W.H. White Company marketed the cut over land to farmers in Ohio, southern Michigan and Indiana. In addition, W.H. White Company marketed to Europeans looking to immigrate and farm in Northern Michigan. The rationale was that the BCG&A provided a modern transportation system to new immigrants not only for getting there, but also for shipping their farm products and the necessary goods to them. The BCG&A provided the W.H. White Company a way to sell the near worthless cut over land to European immigrants looking to farm. In addition, the new immigrants would become the passengers and the freight customers of the BCG&A, which the W.H. White Company planned to continue to operate. Unfortunately for the immigrants, Northern Michigan has a short growing season and the majority of the cut over land was of poor farming quality. The BCG&A attempted to operate rail service between Boyne City and Alpena, but passenger and the diminished freight revenues after the timber was gone were not sufficient to profitably operate the railroad. In 1935, the BCG&A went bankrupt and the line was sold for scrap. In addition, the W.H. White Company could not pay taxes on their cut over land. As a result, the company forfeited their ownership to the State of Michigan. Much of the former White Company land was reorganized as key land parcels within the Mackinaw State Forest, a Michigan state forest that aimed at long-term rehabilitation of the damaged land.

== Boyne City Railroad and Boyne Valley Railroad ==
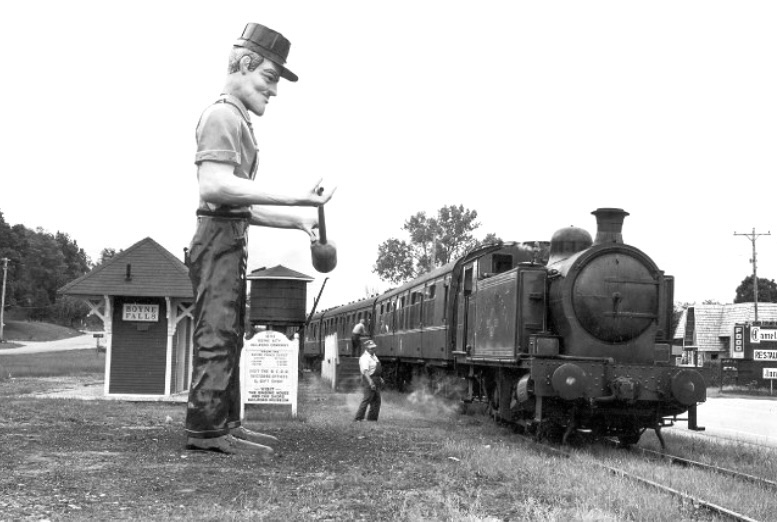
Flying Duchess at the Boyne Falls station with its coaches, c. 1970s

The Boyne City Railroad (BCRR) was a shortline railroad operating on 7.2 miles (11.6 km) of the railroad's original roadbed. The resumed its predecessor's primary function of providing freight service from Boyne City to the Boyne Falls north-south trunk line, operated successively by the Pennsylvania Railroad, the Penn Central, and the Michigan Northern.

Freight services on the railroad ceased in 1970. Hollis Baker – who owned the railroad at the time – repurposed the railroad for heritage passenger services, with the intention to revive the railroad. Two locomotives were used for these services: Flying Duchess, a British steam locomotive which arrived at the BCRR in 1971, and a GE 44-ton switcher. Flying Duchess hauled British Rail Mark 1 coaches, and the 44-ton switcher hauled two to three open observation cars, one roofed observation car, and a caboose.

In 1976, the BCRR was auctioned off, and became the Boyne Valley Railroad (BVRR). As a result of the 1970s energy crisis, Baker would begin auctioning everything from the BCRR on May 15, 1976. Baker valued the entire railroad – including approximately 2,000 items from the museum and 600 feet (180 m) of Lake Charlevoix frontage – at US$400,000 (equivalent to US$2,300,000 in 2025). The railroad line and its rolling stock were bid for US$150,000 or $153,000 (equivalent to US$850,000 and US$870,000 respectively). Michigan state representative E. Dan Stevens later disclosed that the price had been negotiated to $60,000 (equivalent to US$340,000 in 2025). In addition, Baker would keep ownership of the 44-ton switcher and lease it to the BVRR for six years.

The railroad continued service as the Boyne Valley Railroad. In 1978, a survey by the Federal Railroad Administration deemed the railroad lines unsafe, and would have to be rebuilt in order to resume services. The BVRR was unable to afford rebuilding the new lines, and ceased its operations the same year. The BVRR would be formally abandoned in 1982.

== Roadbed remains ==
All of the tracks associated with the Boyne City Railroad have been removed. However, there are many locations where the old roadbed is clearly visible.

- Thunder Bay River East to M-65: In 1931, the river was dammed by the Alpena Power Company. The impounded water eventually eroded the roadbed, however the roadbed is still visible on Google Earth.
- M-65 west: the road is used to access private homes and hunting properties in an area formerly known as the Spratt Club.
- Kerston: The BCG&A crossed a spur of the Detroit & Mackinac Railroad at Kerston. That spur of the D&M railroad ran west from Alpena to Hillman, Michigan.
- Boyne Falls to Elmira: A utility right-of-way that follows the old roadbed is still visibly on Google Earth—starting from the south end of the Boyne Mountain ski resort and running south and east to just north of Elmira. A concrete bridge foundation is visible at the junction of the Grand Rapids & Indiana railroad and Webster Road.45°5′10″N 84°50′52″W
- Hallock Road & Parmeter Road-Otsego County: From there it meanders cross-country towards Gaylord passing just east of the former town and station of Hallock, Michigan. 45°4′20″N 84°46′45″W Hallock was located at the corner of Parmeter Road and Hallock Road about a mile north of W-M32 in Otsego County. The remnants of the BCG&A still visible are a built up right of way and a cut through sand hills. Power lines follow the old right of way. Just outside Gaylord, the old railroad grade intersects Murner Road just north of M-32.
- Jordan River Valley Road follows the old railroad grade. Alongside the road there is excavation evidence as well as bridge pilings crossing the Jordan River. O’Brien Pond is formed by the old road bed of the Boyne City & Southeastern Railroad.

== Surviving equipment ==
At least three pieces of Boyne City, Gaylord & Alpena equipment are known to survive. A Russell snowplow owned by the BCG&A is located at the Mid-Continent Railway Museum in North Freedom WI. Caboose #802 (later Boyne City Railroad #2) is on the grounds of the Kalamazoo (MI) Model Railroad Historical Society. Locomotive #18 is operating on the Arcade and Attica Railroad in New York.

In addition, the Flying Duchess, originally built by Robert Stephenson and Hawthorns as MEA No. 2, and later briefly owned by the Boyne City Railroad, is on static display at La Grange, Kentucky. Two of the three former British Rail Mark 1 passenger coaches are on display at the Standish station in Standish, Michigan.

== See also ==
- Alpena to Hillman Trail
