= Flying Duchess =

British steam locomotive

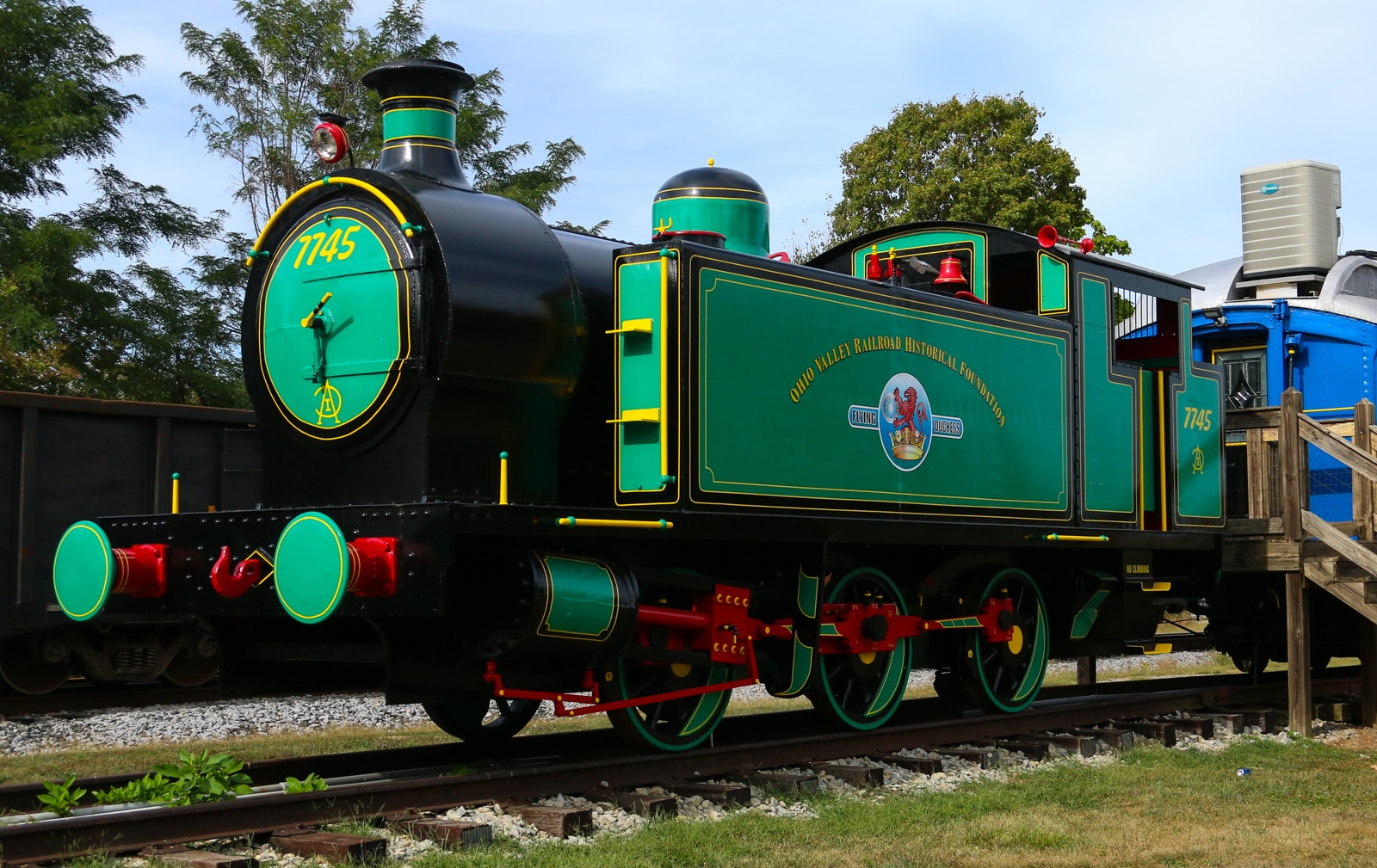
- Flying Duchess at La Grange, Kentucky, in 2019
Type and origin
- Power type: Steam
- Builder: Robert Stephenson and Hawthorns
- Serial number: 7745
- Build date: 1951–1952
Specifications
- Configuration
  - Whyte: 0-6-0T
- Gauge: 1,435 mm (4 ft 8 1/2 in)
- Driver dia.: 3 ft 8 in (1.12 m)
- Loco weight: 50 t (49 long tons; 55 short tons)
- Boiler pressure: 180 psi (1,200 kPa)
- Cylinders: Two, outside
- Cylinder size: 18 in × 24 in (460 mm × 610 mm)
- Valve gear: Stephenson
- Couplers: UK: Buffers and chain; US: Buckeye with buffers
Performance figures
- Tractive effort: 27,000 lbf (120 kN)
Career
- Operators: Meaford (1952–1970); BCRR (1971–1976); BVRR (1976–1977); TVRM (1978–1981)
- Numbers: 7745 (RSH and TVRM); 2 (Meaford)
- Official name: Flying Duchess (BCRR)
- Delivered: 1952
- Retired: 1970 (Meaford); 1976 (BCRR); 1977 (BVRR); 1981 (TVRM)
- Disposition: On static display in La Grange, Kentucky; 38°24′31″N 85°22′31″W

Flying Duchess, also known as No. 7745 and MEA No. 2, is a steam locomotive, built from 1951 to 1952 by Robert Stephenson and Hawthorns (RSH) in North East England. The locomotive originally worked at the Meaford Power Station in Staffordshire, England, numbered MEA No. 2. It worked at the power station until 1970, and in 1971, the locomotive was moved to the United States and named Flying Duchess.

Throughout the 1970s, the locomotive ran on heritage railroads, such as the Boyne City Railroad (BCRR) in Boyne City, Michigan, and the Tennessee Valley Railroad Museum (TVRM) in Chattanooga, Tennessee. After falling into a state of disrepair, it was moved to Indiana and later Kentucky in 2000. Since 2011, it has been on static display at the La Grange Railroad Museum in La Grange, Kentucky.

== History ==
=== United Kingdom (1952–1970) ===
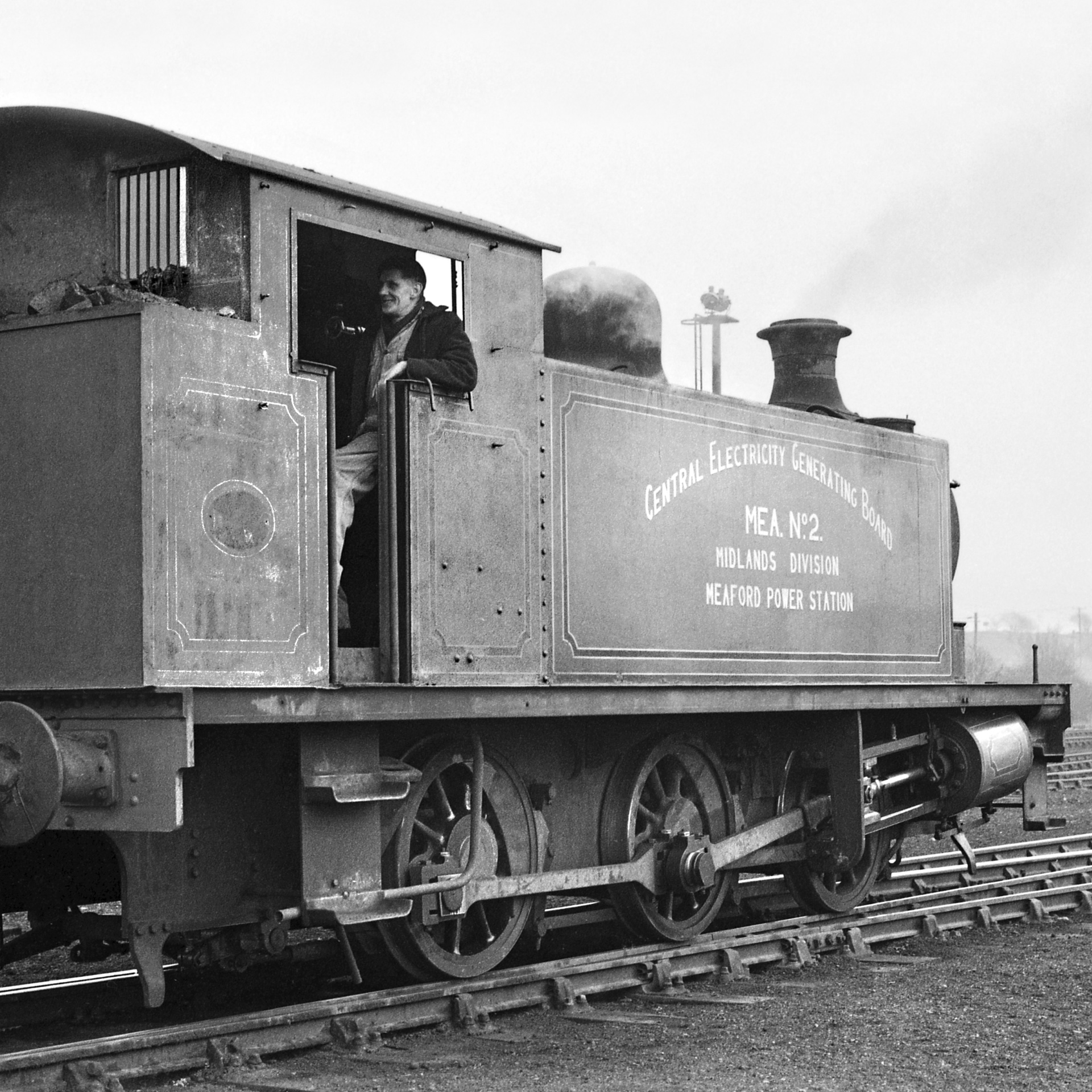
MEA No. 2 at Meaford B, March 1970

The locomotive was built from 1951 to 1952 by Robert Stephenson and Hawthorns (RSH) in North East England, originally numbered 7745. In 1952, the locomotive began service at Meaford B—located within the Meaford Power Station in Staffordshire, England—as MEA No. 2. The locomotive worked with MEA No. 1 (originally numbered 7683), a similar 0-6-0T locomotive built in 1951 by RSH.

The two locomotives were used for heavy shunting services on the 9 miles (14 km) of sidings at the power station. The two locomotives were in steam from 6:00 a.m. to 10:00 p.m. for seven days a week. The two locomotives alternated shunting duties every six weeks until 1966, when the firebox of MEA No. 1 was deemed unsafe. In 1970, MEA. No 1 and MEA No. 2 were withdrawn from service at the power station, and were replaced by diesel locomotives.

=== United States (since 1971) ===
==== Michigan (1971–1977) ====
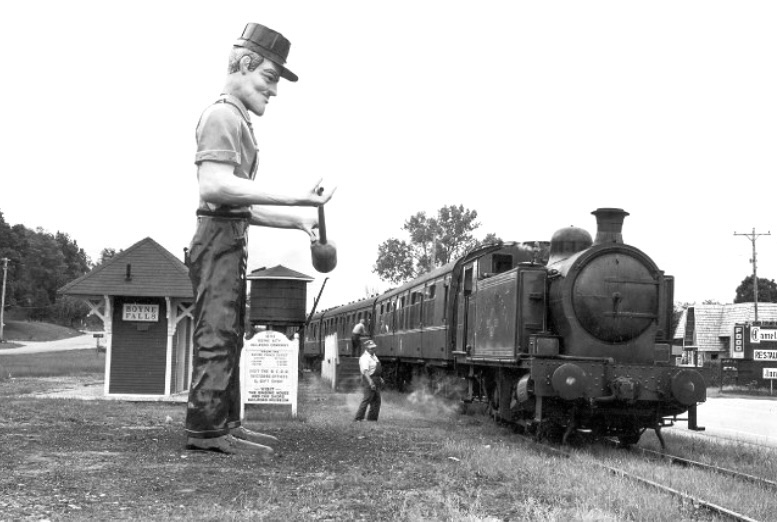
Flying Duchess at the Boyne Falls station with its coaches, c. 1970s

In 1971, the locomotive was bought by Hollis Baker and Charles Williams, and moved to the Boyne City Railroad (BCRR) in Boyne City, Michigan. The locomotive was moved by cargo ship to Detroit, Michigan, and unloaded onto a flatcar in May 1971. The locomotive's move from Detroit to Boyne City was delayed due to the 1971 rail strike. A second locomotive similar to MEA No. 2 was restored and planned to be shipped to the United States, but only MEA No. 2 was shipped.

After the locomotive arrived at the Boyne City Railroad, it was given a new coat of bright green paint and named Flying Duchess. In addition to the locomotive, three maroon British Railways passenger coaches were bought and moved. To comply with local railroad regulations, the locomotive was fitted with buckeye couplers and a high-intensity headlamp. In an interview, Baker stated: "We just thought that an all-English train would be an interesting attraction."

Freight services on the BCRR ceased in 1970, and Baker—the owner of the railroad at the time—repurposed the railroad for running exclusively tourist passenger services, with the intention to revive the railroad. Flying Duchess and its coaches would be used for the railroad's daily summer services, dubbed The English Train by the railroad. A second train, The Mixed Freight, consisted of a GE 44-ton switcher leased by Penn Central (named Lady Bug), two to three open observation cars, one roofed observation car, and a caboose.

The Flying Duchess began its operations at the BCRR on July 24, 1971. The railroad was 7.2 miles (11.6 km) long, with two stations: Boyne City and Boyne Falls. One round trip was about 12 miles (19 km), and took about 1 hour and 40 minutes to complete. Passengers could ride both trains during the same trip; for example, a passenger could ride with The English Train in one direction, and ride with The Mixed Freight in the opposite direction. In the summer of 1972, the two trains carried 24,500 passengers. In 1973, the BCRR ceased its passenger services, which was then attributed to the 1970s energy crisis. On May 15, 1976, Baker would auction off the BCRR. The railroad was sold to a new group, and would continue its passenger services as the Boyne Valley Railroad (BVRR).

==== Tennessee (1977–2000) ====
Flying Duchess leaving the Whiteside Tunnel on the TVRM, c. 1970s

Before the BVRR ceased its operations in 1978, the Chattanooga Coke & Chemicals Company in Chattanooga, Tennessee bought the Flying Duchess and one of the British Railways coaches in 1977. The locomotive and coach were then donated to the Tennessee Valley Railroad Museum (TVRM) in 1978. They were moved via flatcar along the Chattanooga Traction Company's branch line to the museum. Flying Duchess and its coach operated passenger services in October 1978 and September 1979. In the first quarter of 1980, the locomotive was in steam and appeared on the television series PM Magazine.

The locomotive was missing documentation on its boiler, and would need a boiler ticket from the state of Tennessee to continue running. In 1981, the locomotive stopped operating passenger services on the TVRM, and was put on static display. Southern Railway 4501 took over passenger services at the TVRM. The locomotive was not cosmetically maintained while it was on static display, and fell into disrepair.

==== Indiana and Kentucky (since 2000) ====
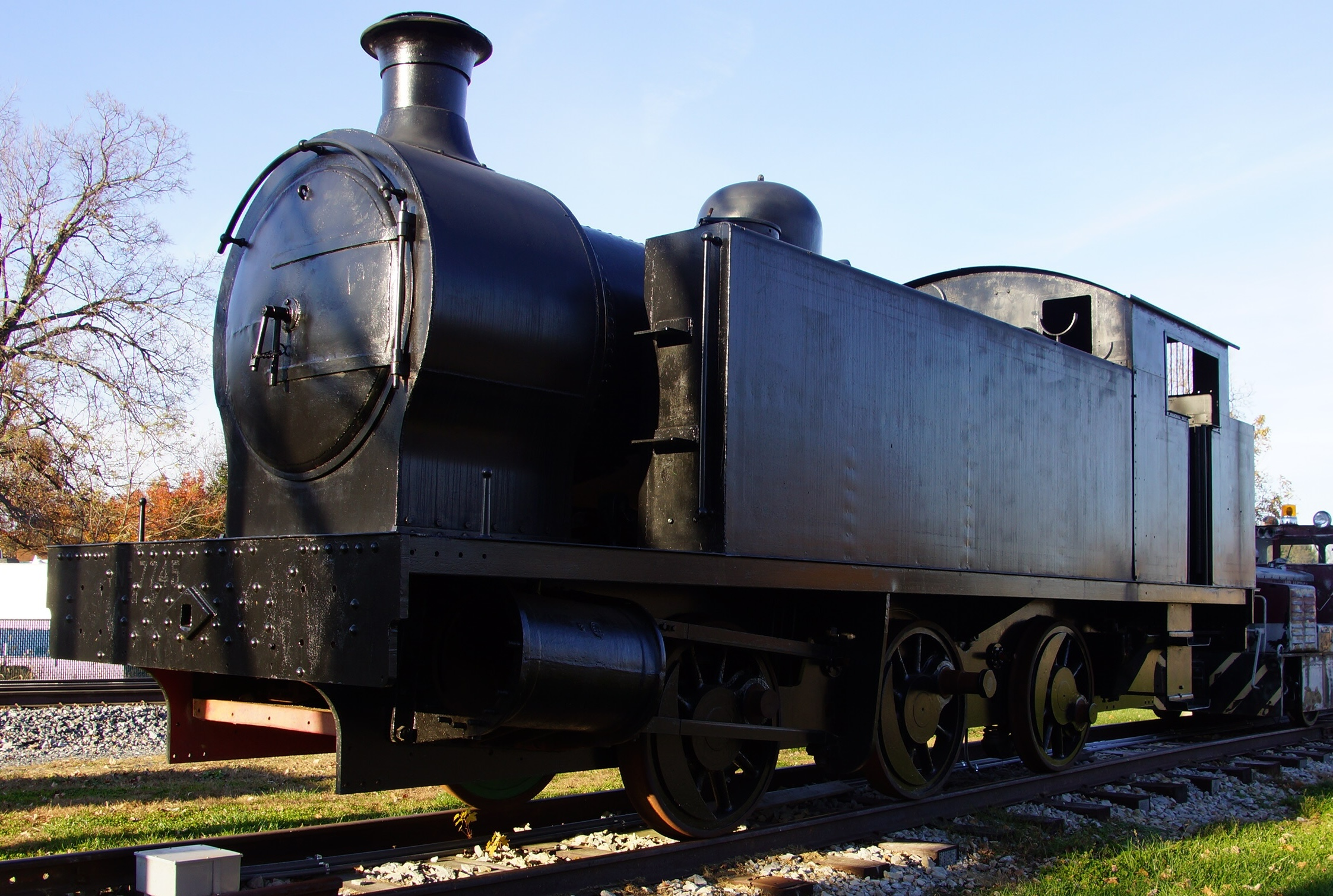
The locomotive in a gloss black at La Grange, Kentucky, November 2014

In 2000, the locomotive was sold and moved to Indiana, and later to Louisville, Kentucky, where it sat in a scrapyard. In 2011, the Louisville Harrods Creek & Westport Railway Foundation, which owned the locomotive at the time, would loan the locomotive for 20 years to the Ohio Valley Railroad Historical Foundation.

Flying Duchess was moved by flatbed truck to the La Grange Railroad Museum in La Grange, Kentucky. The tires on the initial truck's trailer ruptured due to the locomotive's weight. A second truck was brought to move the locomotive, but when the locomotive was placed on the new trailer, its tires ruptured. On August 23, 2011, the locomotive arrived at the museum, and was placed onto the tracks outside the museum's depot the following day. The locomotive's side tanks were obtained separately from the Louisville yard and placed on the locomotive. Several of the original components from the locomotive could not be obtained by the Ohio Valley Railroad Historical Foundation.

A fundraising campaign was started to restore the locomotive cosmetically. The locomotive was painted in a matte black after its arrival to slow down rust. In July 2014, the locomotive was repainted in a gloss black in preparation for a restoration. In 2018, the locomotive received a cosmetic restoration; the locomotive was repainted green, and was fitted with several new components in place of its missing components. As of 2026, the locomotive is on static display about 30 feet (9.1 m) from a CSX railroad line, in front of a dining car and caboose previously owned by the Louisville and Nashville Railroad.

== See also ==
- Arcade & Attica 18—locomotive which also ran on the Boyne City Railroad
- Day Out with Thomas—similar event on heritage railroads
