= DE class =

DE class may refer to:

- Commonwealth Railways DE class, diesel-electric locomotives
- New Zealand DE class locomotive, diesel-electric locomotives
- BHP Whyalla DE class, diesel-electric locomotives
