= Indian locomotive class WDS-1 =

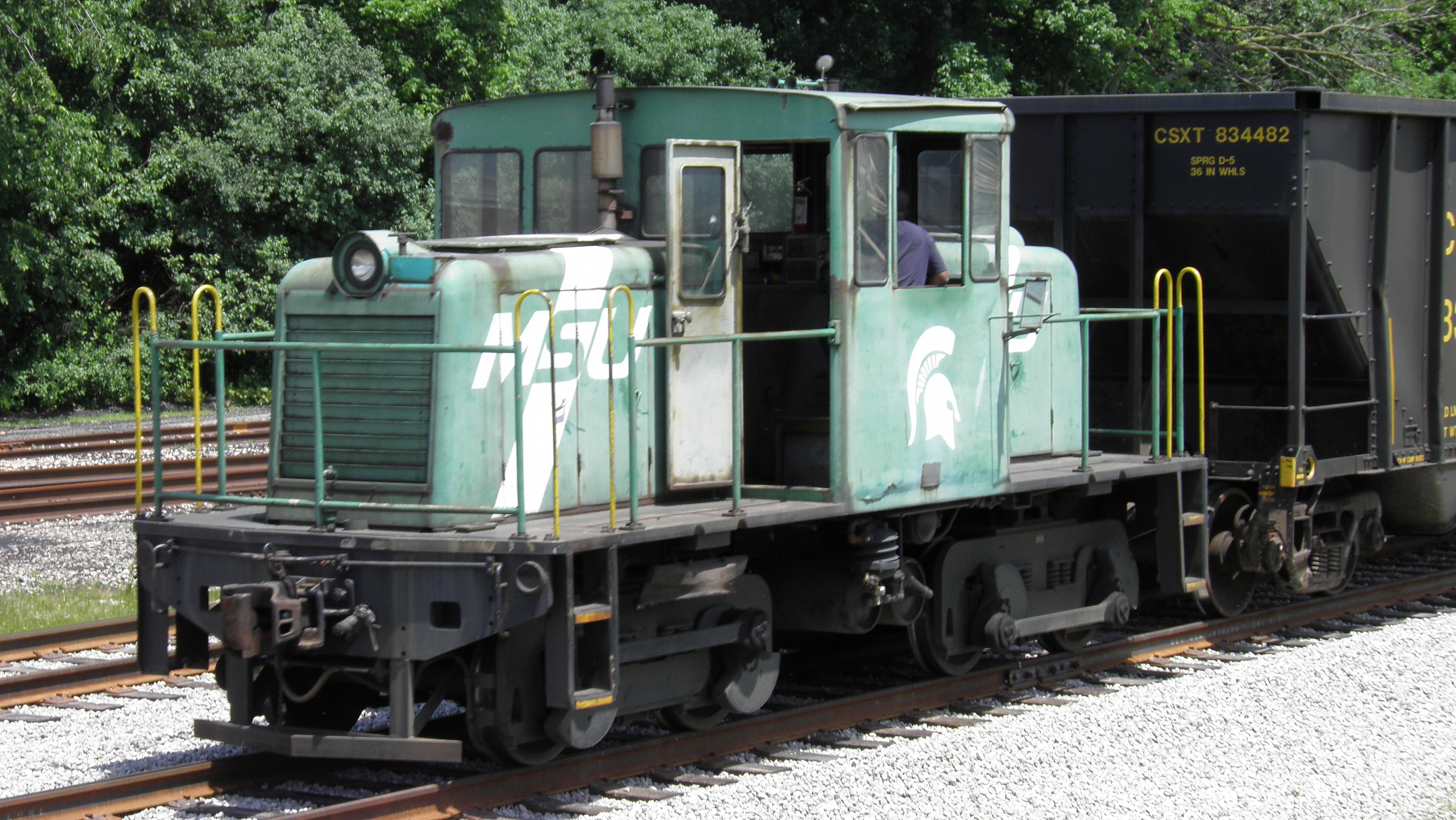
- The GE 45 ton switcher similar to the WDS-1 class
Type and origin
- Power type: Diesel
- Builder: GE
- Build date: 1944–1945
- Total produced: 15
Specifications
- Configuration
  - UIC: Bo′Bo′
  - Commonwealth: Bo-Bo
- Gauge: 1,676 mm (5 ft 6 in)
- Wheel diameter: 1,092 mm (3 ft 7 in)
- Loco weight: 41,000 kg (90,000 lb) to 46,000 kg (101,000 lb)
- Fuel type: Diesel
- Engine type: diesel
- Aspiration: Turbo-supercharged
- Generator: DC
- Transmission: Diesel-electric transmission
- MU working: 2
- Loco brake: Vacuum
- Train brakes: Vacuum
Performance figures
- Maximum speed: 56 km/h (35 mph)
- Power output: Max: 386 hp (288 kW)
- Tractive effort: 11,500 t (11,318 long tons; 12,677 short tons)
Career
- Operators: Indian Railways
- Numbers: 19000-19014
- Locale: Mostly on present day WR and few on ER
- Delivered: 1944
- First run: 1944
- Last run: 1990s
- Retired: 1990s
- Withdrawn: 1990s
- Disposition: Retired

The class WDS-1 was a diesel-electric locomotive used by Indian Railways for shunting and carrying out departmental works. The model's name stands for broad gauge (W), Diesel (D), Shunting (S) 1st generation (1). The WDS-1 is used mostly in the Northern Railway Zone (NR). All these locomotives were withdrawn from service by the late 1990s.

== History ==
During World War II, the USATC took effective control of the ports of Bombay, Calcutta, and Karachi and obtained 50 General Electric built Bo-Bo diesel locomotives to operate them. These were a standard General Electric 45 ton design of locomotive. When delivered to India the locomotives were split between the Bengal and Assam Railway (BAR), the Bombay, Baroda and Central India Railway (BB&CIR), the Great Indian Peninsula Railway (GIPR), and the North Western State Railway (NWR) and were used for working military traffic between the ports and mainline railways. After the war, they became the property of the mainline railways and in turn became IR locos. Post war they were designated as ADE class and on IR they were WDS-1 class. One unidentified member of the class has been preserved and is now at the Diesel Locomotive Works (DLW), Varanasi.

Upon the departure of the Americans, the locomotives all became part of the stocks of their respective companies. In August 1947, 14 of the locomotives fell under ownership of the Pakistan Railway. All NWR examples were among these, along with two each from BBCIR (6500-01), GIPR (6526-27), and the BAR pair. They became their ADE36 class with the running numbers 6501 to 6514. The ones that remained in India became ADE class locos and were numbered 410 to 425. All but one of these 15 became WDS-1 class locos and received the numbers 19000 to 14. The missing loco was sold to Chittaranjan Locomotive Works for use as their works shunter where it remains albeit now preserved.

== Former shed ==
- Gooty (GY): All the locomotives of this class have been withdrawn from service.

== See also ==
- Locomotives of India
- New South Wales 79 class locomotive – Another GE switcher design exported abroad.
- Indian locomotive class WDM-2
