= Alpena to Hillman Trail =

Rail trail in Michigan, United States

- Nearest city: Alpena, Michigan
- Governing body: Michigan Department of Natural Resources
- Length: 24 mi (39 km)
- Trailheads: Hillman, Michigan; 45.0681°N 83.8801°W; Alpena, Michigan; 45.0582°N 83.4590°W
- Use: Cycling, Equestrian, Hiking, Snow-mobiling, XC skiing
- Difficulty: Easy
- Season: All

The Alpena to Hillman Trail is a 24-mile (39 km) recreational rail trail serving a section of the northern quarter of the Lower Peninsula of the U.S. state of Michigan. It uses segments of what was once the eastern spur of the Boyne City Railroad, a 1918 logging railroad that stretched across the northern counties of Michigan's Lower Peninsula from Boyne City, Michigan to Alpena, Michigan.

The rail trail was improved, starting in 2016, by the Michigan Department of Natural Resources.
