= Arcade and Attica 18 =

Preserved American locomotive from 1920

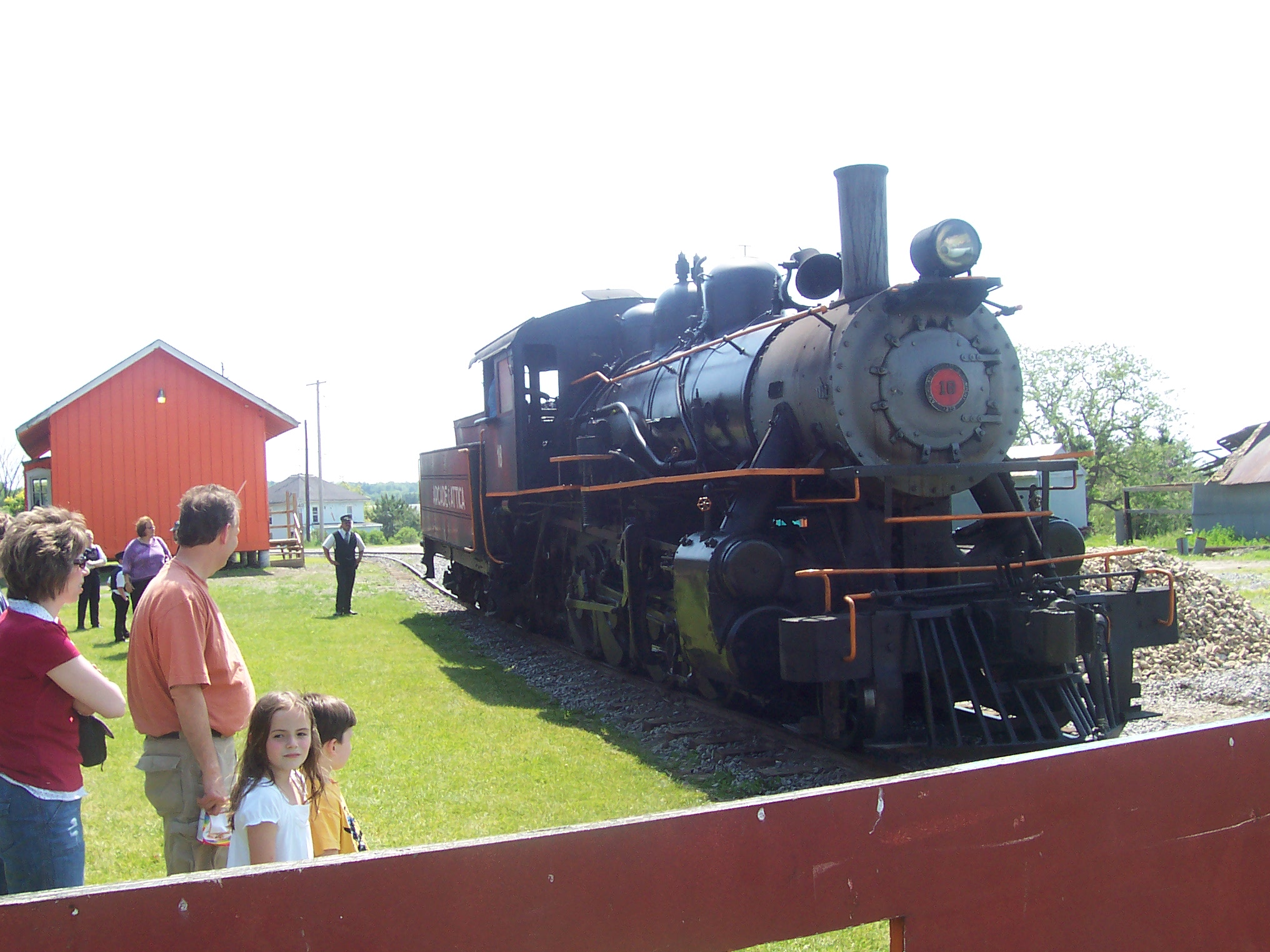
- No. 18 at Curriers, New York in 2009
Type and origin
- Power type: Steam (280-123)
- Builder: American Locomotive Company (Cooke Works)
- Serial number: 62624
- Build date: November 1920
Specifications
- Configuration
  - Whyte: 2-8-0
- Gauge: 4 ft 8 1/2 in (1,435 mm)
- Driver dia.: 50 in (1.270 m)
- Fuel type: Coal
- Boiler pressure: 175 lbf/in^{2} (1.21 MPa)
- Cylinders: Two, outside
- Cylinder size: 18 in × 24 in (457 mm × 610 mm)
- Valve gear: Walschaerts
- Valve type: Piston valves
- Loco brake: Air
- Train brakes: Air
- Couplers: Knuckle
Performance figures
- Tractive effort: 28,400 lbf (126.33 kN)
Career
- Operators: Charcoal Iron Company; Newberry Lumber and Chemical Company; Boyne City Railroad; Arcade and Attica Railroad
- Numbers: CIC 18; NLC 18; BCR 18; ARA 18
- Nicknames: Stanley
- Locale: New York
- Retired: 1950
- Restored: July 27, 1962
- Current owner: Arcade and Attica Railroad
- Disposition: Operational

Arcade and Attica 18 is a 2-8-0 "Consolidation"-type steam locomotive, built in November 1920 by the American Locomotive Company (ALCO) at its Cooke Works in Paterson, New Jersey. It is preserved and operated by the Arcade and Attica Railroad (ARA).

== History ==
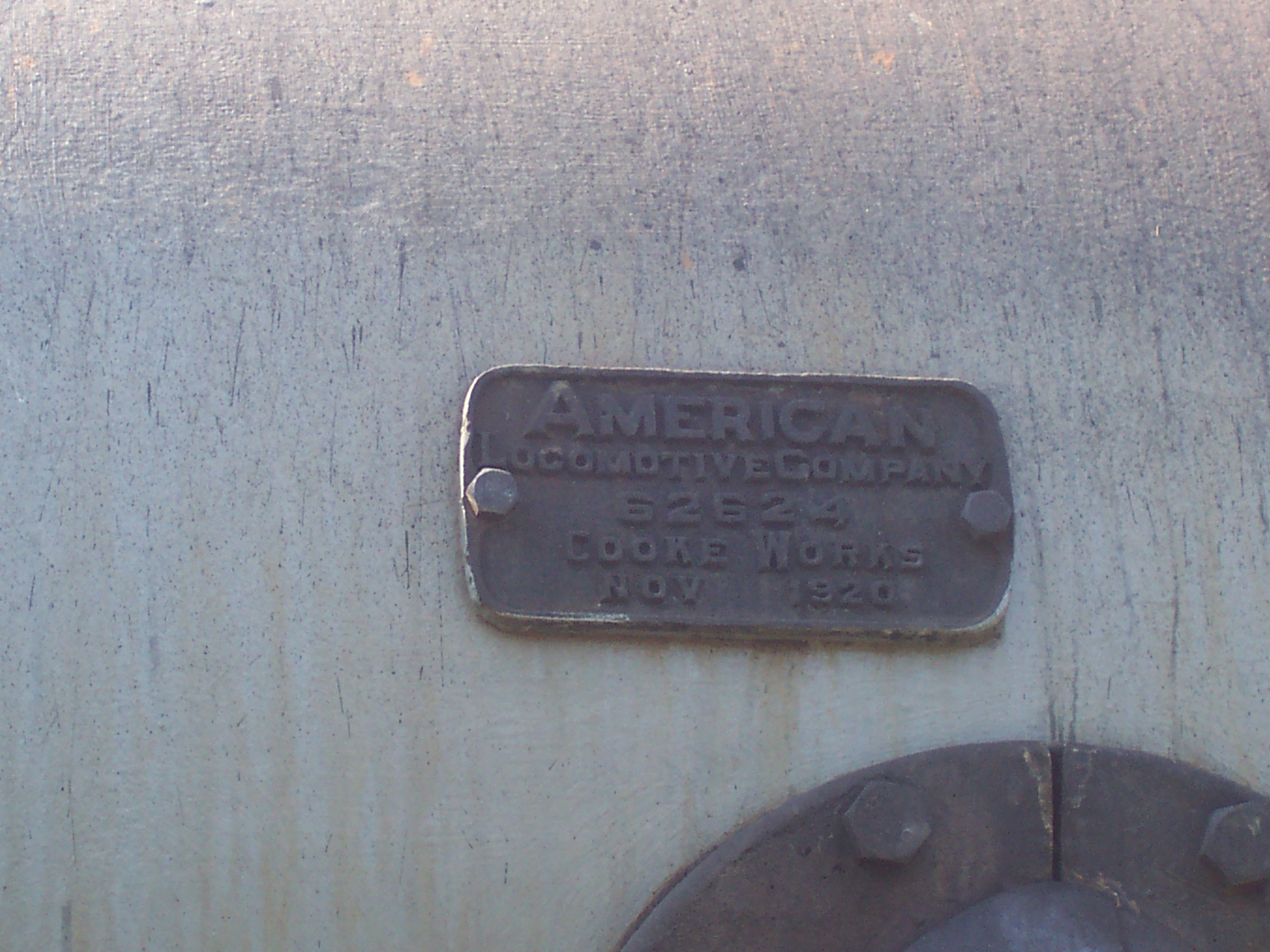
No. 18's builder's plate

The American Locomotive Company (ALCO) built No. 18 in November 1920 at its Cooke Works in Paterson, New Jersey. ALCO hoped a Cuban sugar mill would buy the locomotive, but it was eventually sold to Charcoal Iron Company (CIC) in upper Michigan. The locomotive was later sold to the Newberry Lumber and Chemical Company (NLC), then sometime after 1929 sold again to the Boyne City Railroad (BCRR) of Boyne City, Michigan. BCRR used No. 18 in freight service on its line between Boyne City (where it interchanged with the Pennsylvania Railroad) to Boyne Falls. In 1950, BCRR bought a 44-ton GE switcher and relegated No. 18 to backup and serviceable storage.

In 1962, the Arcade and Attica Railroad (ARA), seeking additional revenue to supplement its freight income, purchased No. 18 and two Boonton-style commuter coaches from Erie Lackawanna Railway. After restoration, No. 18 was given the nickname Stanley and hauled the railroad's first steam passenger run on July 27, 1962.

Since then, No. 18 has hauled passenger excursion trains between Arcade and Curriers, with occasional ventures to Java, New York, on passenger and freight trains.

After the 2001 passenger excursion season, No. 18 went into the A&A's workshops for a teardown and overhaul to bring it into compliance with the new 49 C.F.R. Part 230, the Federal Railroad Administration's new regulations on steam locomotive inspection and maintenance. No. 18 emerged from the shops in 2008.

On May 27, 2017, when the railroad celebrated its 100th anniversary, No. 18 was turned on the wye to face the railroad south for the first time ever; it began hauling excursion trains tender first.

By August 2018, the locomotive was again in need of repair and was taken out of service to undergo its Federal Railroad Administration (FRA) 1,472-day inspection and overhaul. In March 2019, A&A officials announced that its condition was worse than anticipated, and it would be out of service for the year. Repairs, which included the partial replacement of its firebox, took longer than expected. In 2020, officials said the locomotive would begin reassembly in spring 2021.

The locomotive returned to service on August 24, 2024. No. 18 hauled its first two excursion trains in six years on September 28, a third on September 29, and a fourth on October 3.

== Bibliography ==
- Springirth, Kenneth C. (2009). Arcade and Attica Railroad. Images of Rail (1st ed.). Arcadia Publishing. ISBN 978-0-7385-5362-7.
