= NLR crane tank =

Type and origin
- Power type: Steam
- Designer: Sharp Stewart
- Builder: Sharp, Stewart & Co.
- Serial number: 1039
- Build date: 1858
- Total produced: 1
- Rebuilder: Bow Works
- Rebuild date: 1872
Specifications
- Configuration
  - Whyte: 0-4-2ST
- Gauge: 4 ft 8 1/2 in (1,435 mm)
- Driver dia.: 3 ft 10 in (1.168 m)
- Loco weight: 32.30 long tons (32.82 t)
- Fuel type: Coal
- Boiler pressure: 120 psi (0.83 MPa)
- Cylinders: Two
- Cylinder size: 13 in × 17 in (330 mm × 432 mm)
Performance figures
- Tractive effort: 6,370 lbf (28.3 kN)
Career
- Operators: North London Railway; London and North Western Railway; London, Midland and Scottish Railway; British Railways
- Withdrawn: 1951
- Disposition: Scrapped

The North London Railway crane tank was an 0-4-2ST crane tank locomotive. Originally built in 1858 as an 0-4-0ST by Sharp, Stewart and Company for the North and South Western Junction Railway. It was quickly passed to the North London Railway (NLR) who numbered it 37; they renumbered it 29 in 1861 before placing it on the duplicate lst as 29A in 1872. The same year it was rebuilt into an 0-4-2ST with a steam crane carried by the trailing truck.

It was subsequently inherited by the London and North Western Railway (LNWR) in January 1922, who allocated it the number 2896; and then in turn the London, Midland and Scottish Railway (LMS) in January 1923. They allocated it the number 7217, but it was June 1926 before it was applied. The LMS placed it on the duplicate list as 27217 in February 1935 before it finally passed to British Railways in 1948. It was allocated the BR number 58865, and renumbered in March 1949. It was the oldest locomotive to be inherited by BR. When finally withdrawn in 1951, it was the oldest surviving standard gauge engine in service with British Railways. It was scrapped at Derby Works in February 1951.
