= Arcade and Attica Railroad =

Shortline railroad in New York, US

Coordinates: 42.533772°N 78.423813°W

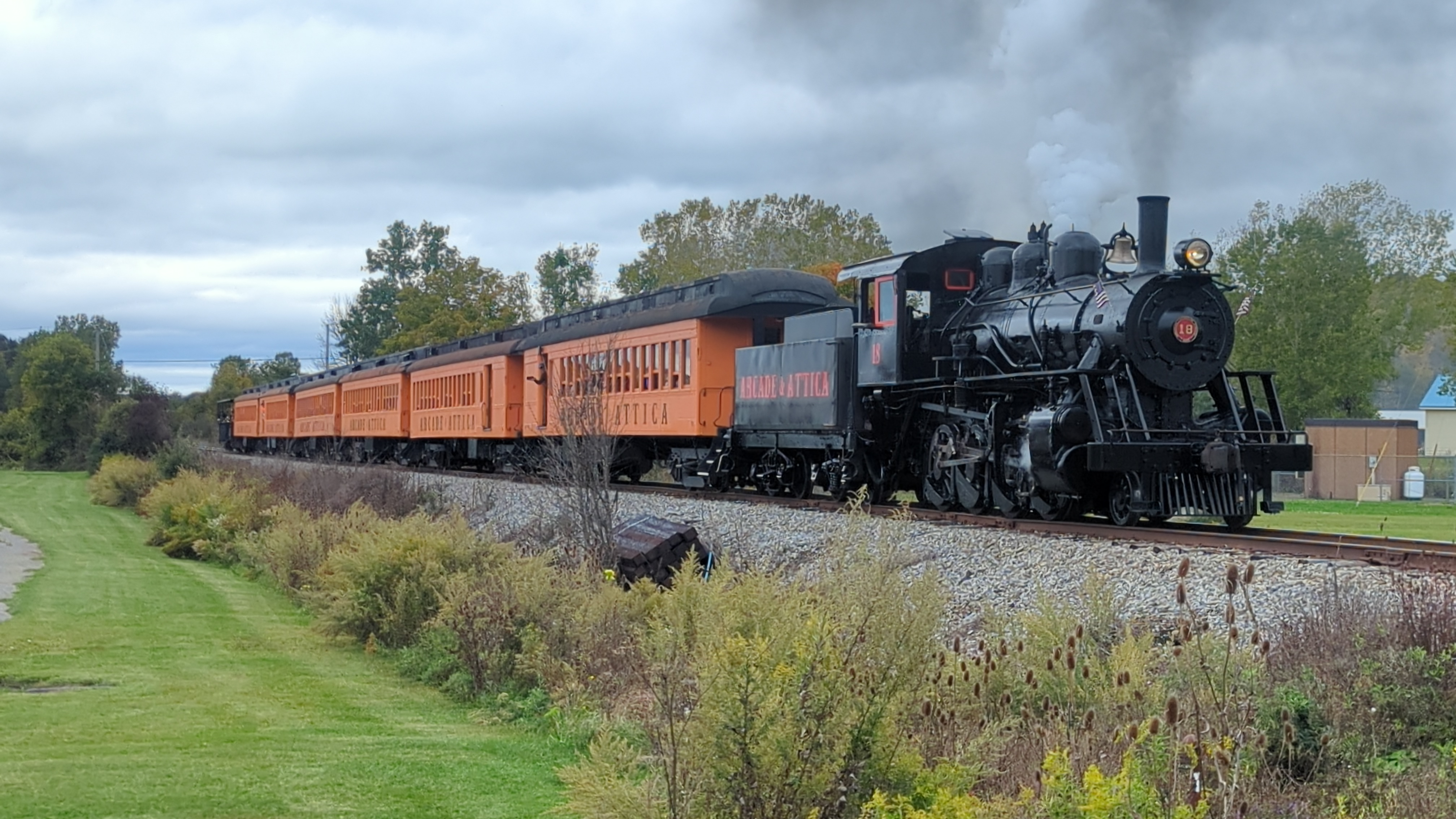
- No. 18 hauling an excursion train in September 2024

Overview
- Headquarters: Arcade, New York
- Reporting mark: ARA
- Locale: Wyoming County, New York
- Dates of operation: 1917–present

Technical
- Track gauge: 4 ft 8 1/2 in (1,435 mm) standard gauge
- Length: 14 miles (23 km)

Other
- Website: http://www.aarailroad.com/
Route map
- Arcade and Attica Railroad
- U.S. National Register of Historic Places
- Location within New York
- Location: Railroad right of way from Arcade to N. Java, North Java, New York
- Area: 122 acres (49 ha)
- Built: 1880
- NRHP reference No.: 80002797
- Added to NRHP: November 17, 1980

The Arcade and Attica Railroad (reporting mark ARA) is a shortline and heritage railroad that hauls both freight and passenger trains between Arcade and North Java, New York. The railroad originally connected Arcade with Attica until the right of way from North Java to Attica was abandoned in 1957 due to flooding on the Tonawanda Creek.

The ARA's main business is handling agricultural products such as soybeans, corn, fertilizer, lumber, dairy feed, and other commodities between Arcade and North Java. The ARA also runs passenger excursion trains from May to October on Fridays, Saturdays and Sundays. Passengers can ride the 14-mile (23 km) round trip from Arcade to Curriers Station on restored 1920s-era Boonton passenger coaches as well as a covered gondola pulled by one of the vintage Centercab Diesels (#113, built in 1959, and #112, built in 1945).

As of 2024, ARA uses its newly acquired 1952 RS3m #114 to handle freight runs from Arcade to the Reisdorf Brothers feed mill in North Java. However, the railroad's steam locomotive, No. 18, returned from a full rebuild in August 2024, meaning the General Electric centercab locomotives will take a break from frequent service.

== History ==
Map of the Arcade and Attica Railroad, highlighting the companies that originally constructed the line.

The Arcade and Attica Railroad was the latest in a long succession of railroads planned and built through the Tonawanda Valley in Wyoming County.

In 1836, the Attica and Sheldon Railroad was proposed, but no construction ever took place.

In 1852, the Attica and Alleghany Valley Railroad was incorporated to build a 3 ft (914 mm) narrow-gauge railway from Attica, through Arcade to the Pennsylvania state line. In 1853, construction began and most of the road was graded between Attica and Arcade. Construction was discontinued in 1855, with the property was sold at foreclosure on February 2, 1856.

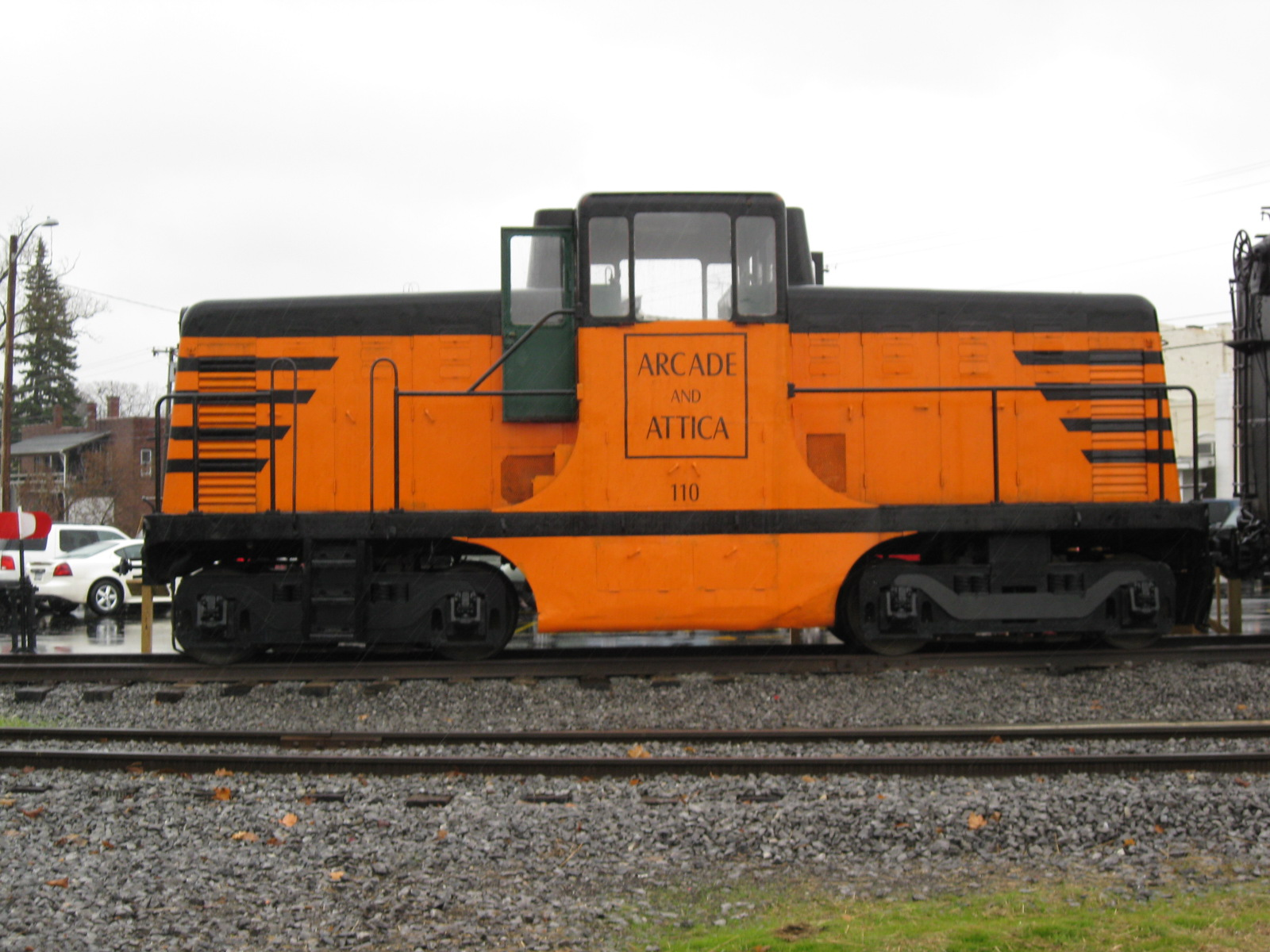
The Arcade & Attica's GE 44-ton locomotive No. 110 on static display.

On February 28, 1870, the Attica and Arcade Railroad was organized and began purchasing the right of way with construction of the line scheduled for completion by October 1, 1876. The railroad went bankrupt in 1873, and construction remained uncompleted.

On April 5, 1880, the Tonawanda Valley Railroad was incorporated with major financial backing from the Erie Railroad. The company planned to build a 24 mi (39 km) long narrow gauge line from Attica, through Curriers Corners, to Sardinia to connect with the Buffalo, New York, and Pennsylvania Railroad. On September 11, 1880, the first train ran on the line from Attica to Curriers Corners. In October 1880, the Tonawanda Valley Extension Railroad was organized to extend the line from Curriers to Sardinia. By that winter the company changed its decision and began building to Arcade, rather than Sardinia. By May 1, 1881, the line had reached Arcade. On July 14, 1881, the Tonawanda Valley and Cuba Railroad was formed to extend the line from Arcade to Cuba via Sandusky and Rushford. On August 27, 1881, the Tonawanda Valley Railroad, Tonawanda Valley Extension Railroad, and Tonawanda Valley and Cuba were merged into the new Tonawanda Valley and Cuba Railroad. By September 4, 1882, the line was complete between Attica and Cuba. The Company built facilities to transfer to the standard-gauge Erie Railroad in Attica and Cuba. In Cuba, the company made a connection with the Bradford, Eldred and Cuba, another narrow-gauge railroad controlled by the Erie.

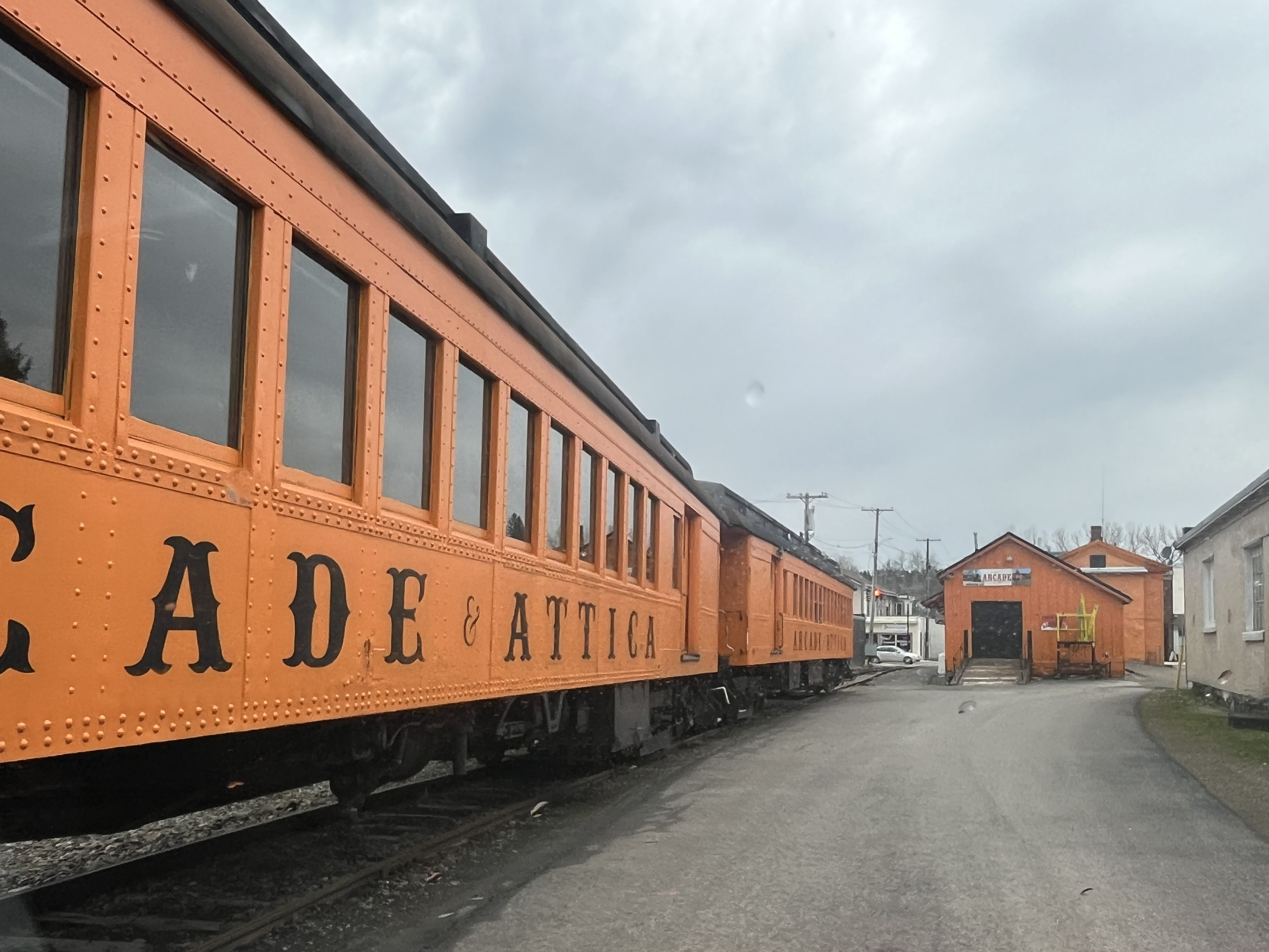
An excursion train by the ARA depot, April 19, 2024

By September 1884, the company was defaulting on its bonds and on November 29, the company went into receivership. The company's situation declined further when Bradford, Eldred, and Cuba went bankrupt. The company struggled until October 30, 1886, when it stopped its service from Cuba to Sandusky. On January 19, 1891, the section from Attica to Freedom was sold to bondholders and in May of that year, the Attica and Freedom Railroad was formed. The line went bankrupt and was sold in April 1894.

On October 13, 1894, the Buffalo, Attica and Arcade Railroad (BA&A) was formed to operate the line. The new management switched the line to standard gauge. By January 1895, the Attica to Curriers section was operating again. By December of that year, the line was open and running from Attica to Arcade. By December 1897, the company had laid a 2 mi (3.2 km) segment to connect with the Pennsylvania Railroad near Arcade. By January 1902, the company had built a line from Arcade to Sandusky with the ultimate goal of reaching Crystal Lake. In August of that year, a flood washed out much of the line between Arcade and Sandusky along with the connection to the Pennsylvania Railroad.

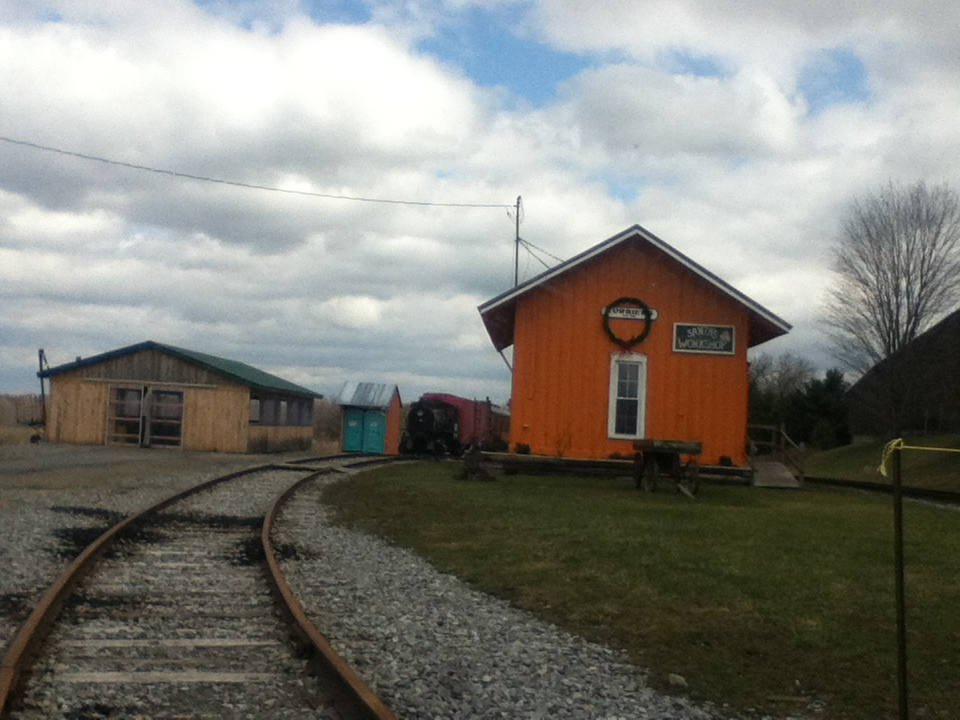
Curriers station on June 3, 2012

In 1904, the BA&A was sold to the Buffalo and Susquehanna Railroad (B&S) which connected the BA&A in Arcade. The B&S operated the line until 1913 when it changed to being operated under lease from the Goodyear family by W. L. Kann of Pittsburgh. The railroad lost enough money in such a short time that Kann ended the agreement on his end. By 1916–1917, the foreclosure of the B&S and W&B forced the Buffalo, Attica, and Arcade into abandonment.

On May 23, 1917, the Arcade and Attica Railroad (ARA) was formed by local investors to operate the line. The line had its ups and downs but survived. It had the enviable distinction of not laying off a single employee during the Great Depression. In 1941, the company purchased a 44-ton diesel locomotive from General Electric. The diesel locomotive was more dependable and much less expensive to operate than the steam locomotives. Many people credit this locomotive with preventing the A&A from going bankrupt in 1941. The A&A operated passenger service until 1951 when the Erie stopped providing a service on the Buffalo-Hornell line, including the connection with the A&A in Attica. In 1957, the line was abandoned between Attica and North Java because of severe washouts in the spring of that year.

In 1962, the ARA was seeking additional revenue to supplement the freight income and decided to re-enter passenger excursion services. They purchased a 2-8-0 type steam locomotive, No. 18, from the Boyne City Railroad, along with two Boonton-style commuter coaches from Erie Lackawanna Railway, No. 18 was restored and hauled the railroad's first official steam passenger run on July 27, 1962. The following year, the railroad purchased their second steam locomotive, a 4-6-0 type steam locomotive, No. 14, from the Escanaba and Lake Superior Railroad along with more Delaware, Lackawanna and Western coaches purchased. The line would become known as the "Grand Scenic Route".

During the 1960s, the A&A struck its mark when Borden's debuted the non-dairy creamer Cremora. The Arcade facility was the sole Cremora production plant in the United States until its closure in 1970. The A&A brought in the raw supplies and shipped out the finished product across the U.S., its orange and white boxcars becoming iconic in the process.

On May 27, 2017, the railroad held a 100th anniversary celebration marking the corporation's centenary. As part of the celebration, steam locomotive No. 18 was turned on the wye to face the railroad south for the first time in its history. Until that weekend, it had always faced north. Other events included speeches at the station, employee photographs, a ribbon-cutting ceremony, and a cake-cutting at the Curriers Depot.

== Locomotives ==
Locomotive details
Number	Image	Type	Model	Built	Builder	Status
14		Steam	4-6-0	1917	Baldwin Locomotive Works	Stored, awaiting restoration
18		Steam	2-8-0	1920	American Locomotive Company	Operational
22		Fireless	0-4-0F	1930	H.K. Porter, Inc.	Display
110		Diesel	44-ton switcher	1941	General Electric	Display
111		Diesel	44-ton switcher	1947	General Electric	Operational
112		Diesel	65-ton switcher	1945	General Electric	Operational
113		Diesel	80-ton switcher	1959	General Electric	Operational
114		Diesel	RS-3m	1952	American Locomotive Company	Operational

== Sources ==
- Springirth, Kenneth C. (2009). Arcade and Attica Railroad. Images of Rail. Arcadia Publishing. ISBN 978-0-7385-5362-7.
