= Crane tank locomotive =

Type of tank engine with a crane mounted on it, often used in industrial environments

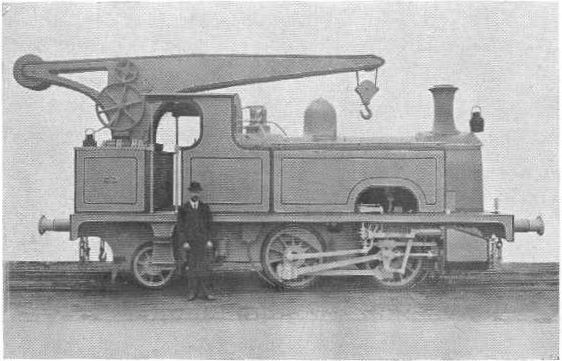
Six-ton crane tank locomotive for the Oudh and Rohilkhand Railway

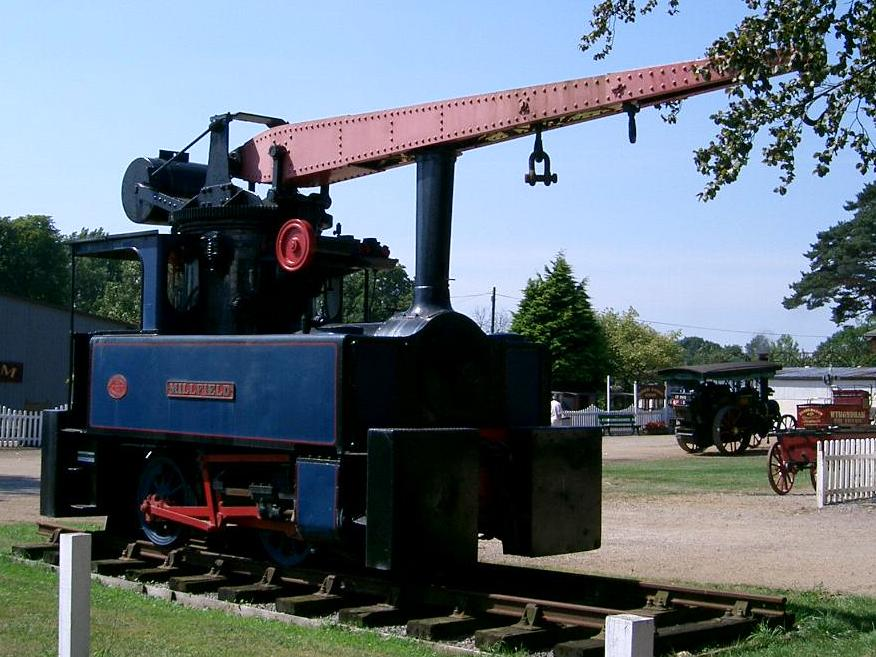
A Robert Stephenson & Hawthorns crane tank at Bressingham Steam & Gardens

A crane tank locomotive (CT) is a steam locomotive fitted with a crane for working in railway workshops, docksides, or other industrial environments. The crane may be fitted at the front, centre or rear.

The 'tank' in its name refers to water tanks mounted either side of the boiler, as cranes were usually constructed on tank locomotives (as opposed to tender locomotives) for greater mobility in the confined locations where they were normally used. There is also a crane engine in the museum of Scottish railways.

== Preserved examples ==
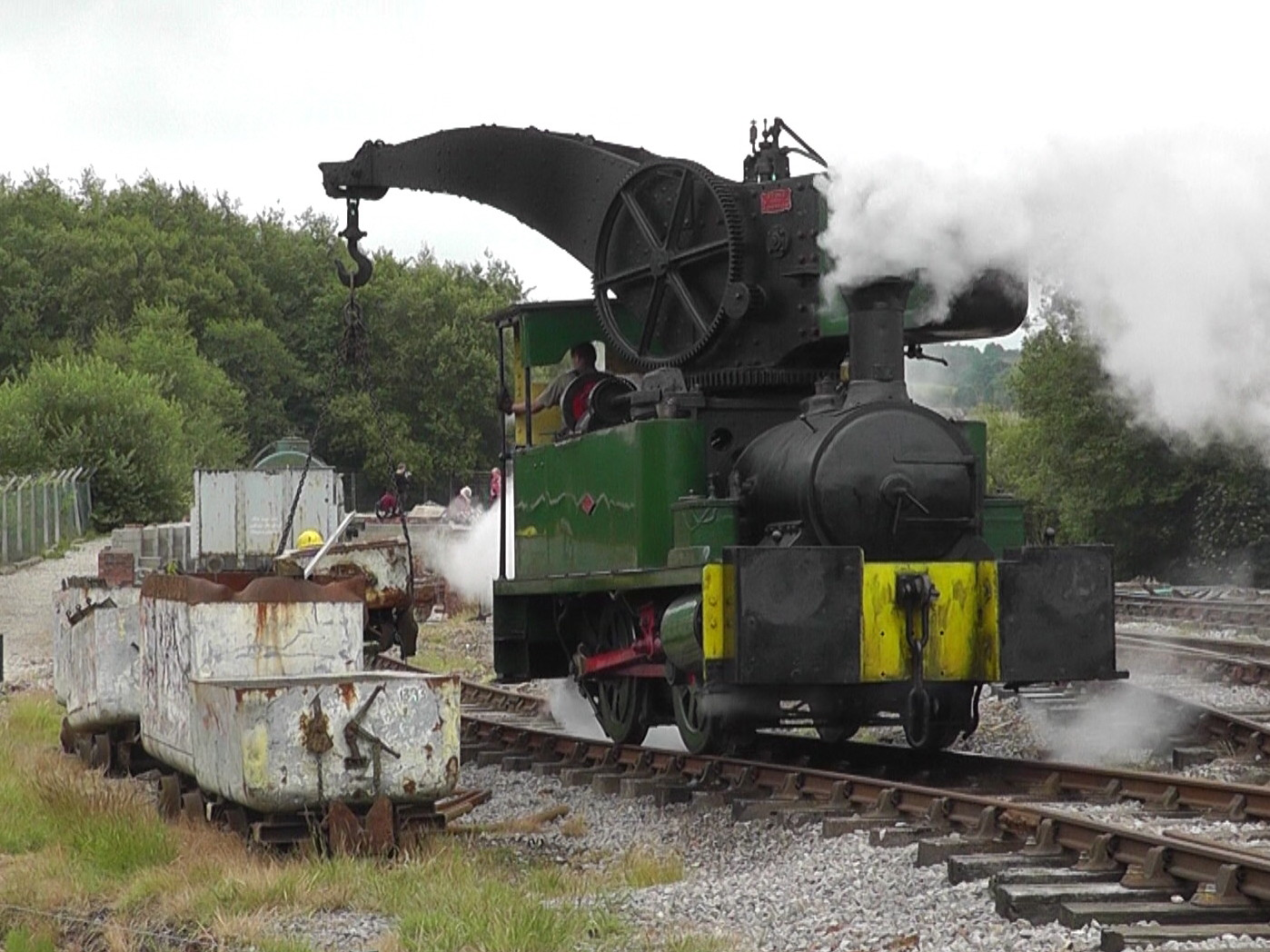
Dübs & Company works no. 4101, an 0-4-0CT

- Shelton Iron & Steel Works No. 4101, an 0-4-0CT built by Dübs & Company built in 1901, entering preservation on the East Somerset Railway in 1970, working 1977-1986 and later sold to the Foxfield Railway, where it entered service in 2010.
- Millfield, an 0-4-0CT built by Robert Stephenson & Hawthorns in 1942 (works no.7070), preserved at Bressingham Steam & Gardens.

== See also ==
- Crane (rail)
- NLR crane tank
- Shelton Iron & Steel Works No. 4101
- Three GWR engines constructed as crane tanks based on 850 class
