= Standish station =

Railway station in Standish, Michigan, United States

Standish
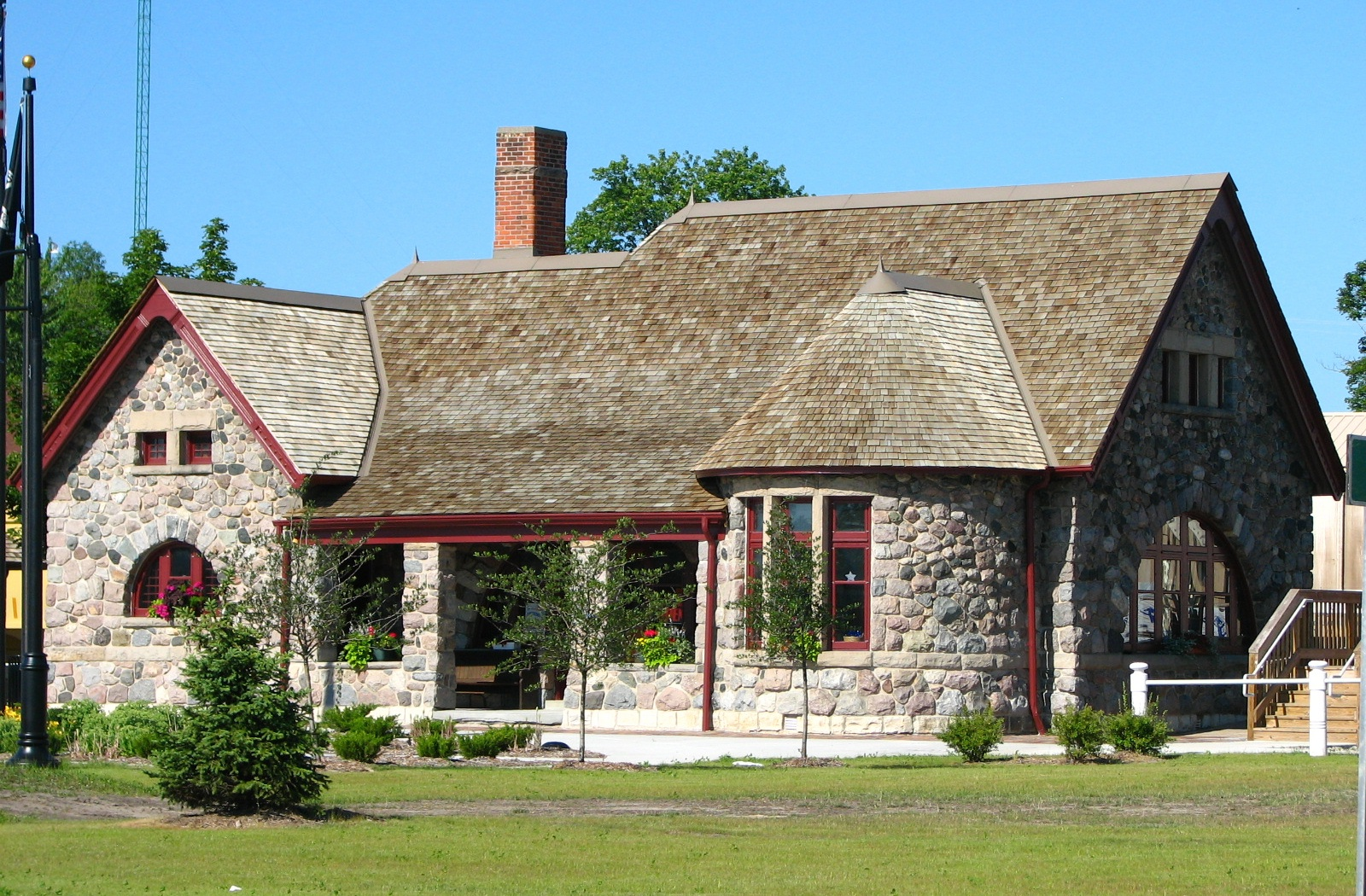

General information
- Location: 107 North Main Street., Standish, Arenac County, Michigan 48658

Former services
| Preceding station | New York Central Railroad | Following station |
|---|---|---|
| Sterling toward Mackinaw City | Mackinaw City – Detroit | Pinconning toward Detroit |
- Michigan Central Railroad Standish Depot
- U.S. National Register of Historic Places
- Michigan State Historic Site
- Location within Michigan Location within the United States
- Location: 107 N. Main St., Standish, Michigan
- Coordinates: 43°59′0″N 83°57′37″W
- Area: less than one acre
- Built by: Adams & Rogers
- Architect: Spier & Rohns
- Architectural style: Richardsonian Romanesque
- NRHP reference No.: 91000215

Significant dates
- Added to NRHP: February 28, 1991
- Designated MSHS: August 27, 1977
Location

Standish is a disused railroad depot located at 107 North Main Street in Standish, Michigan. It was designated a Michigan State Historic Site in 1977 and listed on the National Register of Historic Places in 1991 as the Michigan Central Railroad Standish Depot.

== History ==
In 1870, the Jackson, Lansing and Saginaw Railroad constructed a line through this section of Arenac County to connect Bay City with Mackinaw City. The next year, the Michigan Central Railroad leased the line to begin passenger service. The city of Standish was developed on this railroad line. The first depot, located south of the current structure, was built in 1871 of wood. By 1887, the depot was badly deteriorated, and Michigan Central promised to replace it as part of their push to upgrade depots throughout the state. They hired the Detroit architectural firm of Spier & Rohns to design this depot. Adams and Rogers of Detroit constructed the depot, using stones provided by local farmers. Construction began in May 1889 and the depot was completed in October 1889.

The area around the depot was made into a park, with a bandstand and weekly concerts. However, by the 1920s, both the park and the depot itself were being used less and less as passenger traffic fell off. In 1955, the last passenger train stopped in Standish. The depot was used for freight until 1965 or 66, and then shuttered. In 1988, it was renovated and converted into office space. It is currently used as a welcome center along US 23.

== Description ==
The Michigan Central Railroad depot is a single story Richardsonian Romanesque structure constructed from fieldstone on a fieldstone foundation. Stone slabs are used for the window sills and lintels. The steep roof has a gable at one end and a hip roof at the other. The front facade has a central entrance reached from a broad porch, flanked by building extensions of the freight room and waiting room.

The entrance opens into the former waiting room, which takes up the north 2/3 of the structure. The former freight room occupies the south section of the building, with a small ticket office taking up one section of the waiting area. The current configuration maintains the historical floor plan, with the addition of a small bathroom in the former freight room. The interior ceilings are 12 feet (3.7 m) high, finished with tongue-and-groove. Similar tongue-and-groove birch wood finished the lower half of the walls, above which is plaster.

On the north end of the depot property sits train cars that were donated to portray what it was like in the late 1800s and the transportation system. The sidewalks consist of blocks with names carved in them, those of which who have had an impact. The train depot is now being used for town events such as concerts, markets, car shows, gatherings, and Depot Days which occurs every October. All of these events add more depth to Standish, brings more tourists in and contributes to the town's wealth.
