= Robert Stephenson and Hawthorns =

Defunct locomotive builder in North East England

Robert Stephenson and Hawthorns Ltd (RSH) was a locomotive builder with works in North East England.

== History ==
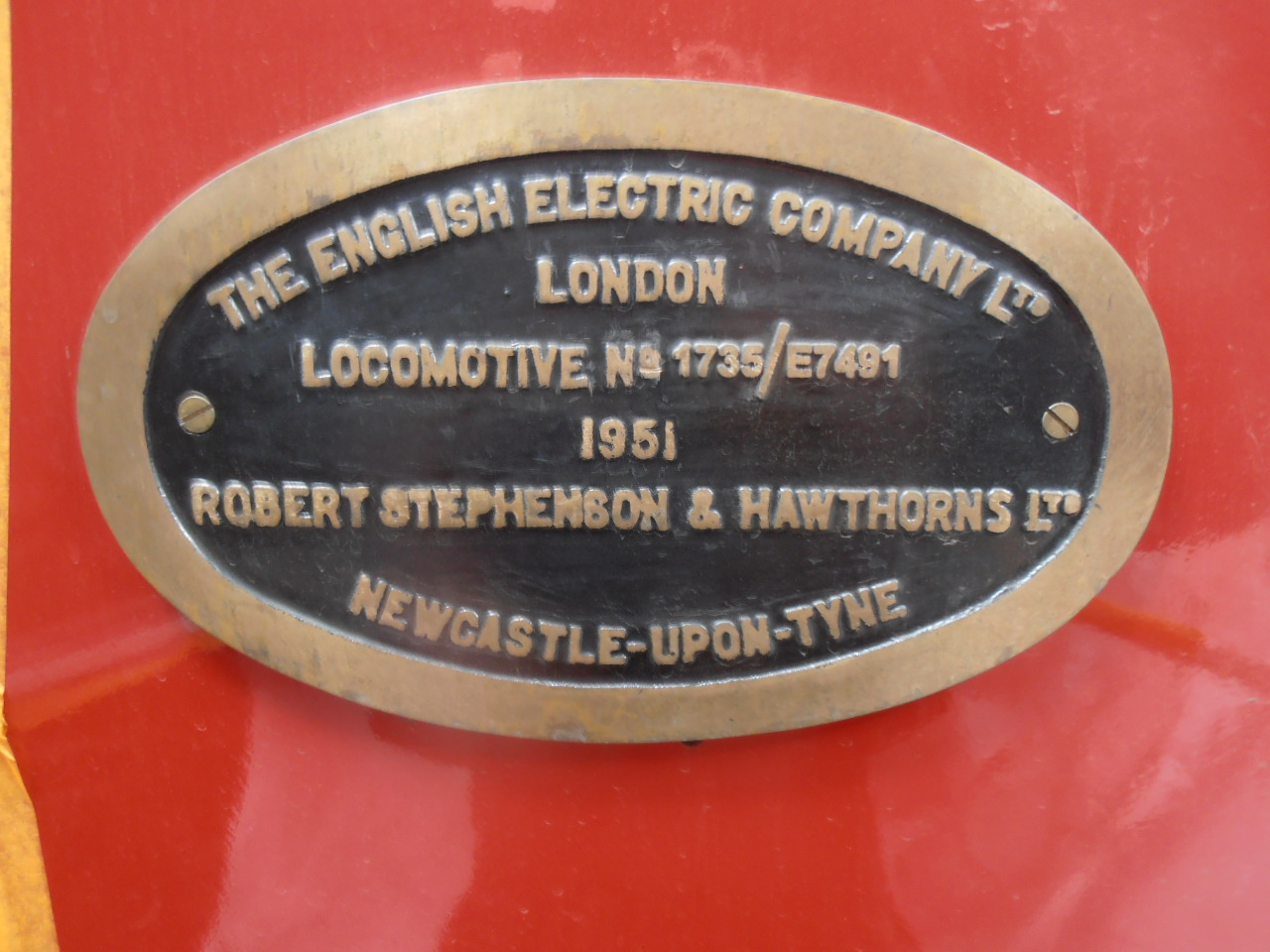
Builders plate from NZGR E^{W} 1805 locomotive

The company was formed in September 1937, when Darlington based Robert Stephenson and Company took over the locomotive building department of Hawthorn Leslie and Company, which was based in Newcastle upon Tyne. The goodwill of Leeds locomotive builders Kitson & Co. was obtained in 1938.

RSH locomotive numbering began at 6939, this being the first number following the sum total of locomotives built by Robert Stephenson & Co. and Hawthorn Leslie, (6938).

RSH became part of English Electric in 1955 and merged with GEC in 1968.

Locomotive building at the Newcastle upon Tyne works ended in 1961 and at Darlington in 1964.

== Diesel locomotives ==
RSH entered the diesel locomotive market in November 1937 with a "direct reversing" locomotive fitted with a Crossley two-stroke engine. There was no reversing gearbox and the diesel engine itself was reversible, as in marine practice. When starting, in either direction, power was supplied by compressed air until the engine fired. One of these locomotives, Beryl (RSH 7697/1953), is preserved at the Tanfield Railway. After the 1955 modernisation plan of British Railways RSH responded by building the following class of diesel locomotives some of which are preserved (Including D306 & D318).

- Class 04
- Class 20
- Class 37
- Class 40

They also built the following for Australia.

- Queensland Railways DL class
- WAGR Z class

== Preservation ==
Location	Country	Name	Works Number	Built	Arrangement	Gauge	Photo and notes
The Norwegian State Railway Museum, Hamar, Norway	NO	NSB Class 2a No. 17 "Caroline"	1407	1861	2-4-0	4 ft 8 1/2 in (1,435 mm)	Operational
Egyptian National Railways Museum, Cairo, Egypt	EG	ESR No. 986		1866	0-6-0	4 ft 8 1/2 in (1,435 mm)	On display
Kaya Railway, SL Plaza, Kaya County, Kyoto, Japan	JP	No. 2	2105	1873	2-4-0T	3 ft 6 in (1,067 mm)	
Glenbrook Vintage Railway, Ferrymead Heritage Park, Glenbrook, NZ	NZ	No. F.233	2593	1885	0-6-0ST	3 ft 6 in (1,067 mm)	
Ulster Folk and Transport Museum	NI	2 Kathleen	2613	1887	4-4-0T	3 ft (914 mm)	Static Display
New Jersey Museum of Transportation	USA	3 Lady Edith	2614	1887	4-4-0T	3 ft (914 mm)	Static Display
Ulster Folk and Transport Museum	NI	LP&HC no. 1	2738	1891	0-6-0ST	5 ft 3 in (1,600 mm)	Static Display
Railway Museum (Western Australia)	AUS	WAGR No. 201	2886	1898	4-4-4T	3 ft 6 in (1,067 mm)	On display
Valley Heights Rail Museum	AUS	Commonwealth Portland Cement Co No. 2	2994	1899	0-6-0ST	4 ft 8 1/2 in (1,435 mm)	Operational, Nicknamed "Stevo"
Bressingham Steam and Gardens	GB	LT&SR No. 80 Thundersley	3366	1909	4-4-2T	4 ft 8 1/2 in (1,435 mm)	On display, on loan from the National Railway museum.
Belen de Escobar, Argentina	AR	FCGM No. 907	3512	1912	2-8-2T	5 ft 6 in (1,676 mm)	On display
Mid-Hants Railway	GB	S&DJR No. 88	3894	1925	2-8-0	4 ft 8 1/2 in (1,435 mm)	Out of Service
North Norfolk Railway	GB	S&DJR No. 89	3895	1925	2-8-0	4 ft 8 1/2 in (1,435 mm)	Operational
Museum of Science and Industry	USA	Rocket	4072	1931	0-2-2	4 ft 8 1/2 in (1,435 mm)	Replica, on display
Hopetown Darlington (loan from Darlington Railway Preservation Society)	GB	No. 39	6947	1938	0-6-0T	4 ft 8 1/2 in (1,435 mm)	On display
Beamish Museum	GB	Roker	7006	1940	0-4-0CT	4 ft 8 1/2 in (1,435 mm)	On static display awaiting overhaul
Tanfield Railway	GB	Hendon	7007	1940	0-4-0CT	4 ft 8 1/2 in (1,435 mm)	Awaiting restoration
East Anglian Railway Museum	GB	Pen Green (now Thomas)	7031	1941	0-6-0ST (now with side tanks also)	4 ft 8 1/2 in (1,435 mm)	Operational, converted into a Thomas the Tank Engine replica in March 2008, boiler ticket expires in 2027
Tanfield Railway	GB	Lysaghts	7035	1940	0-6-0ST	4 ft 8 1/2 in (1,435 mm)	Awaiting restoration
Chatham Historic Dockyard	GB	Ajax	7042	1941	0-4-0ST	4 ft 8 1/2 in (1,435 mm)	Operational, worked for the Ministry of Defence
Gwili Railway	GB	Olwen	7058	1942	0-4-0ST	4 ft 8 1/2 in (1,435 mm)	Undergoing overhaul
Foxfield Light Railway	GB	Eustace Forth	7063	1942	0-4-0ST	4 ft 8 1/2 in (1,435 mm)	Operational, boiler ticket expires in 2027
Keighley and Worth Valley Railway	GB	Southwick	7069	1942	0-4-0CT	4 ft 8 1/2 in (1,435 mm)	Undergoing overhaul, owned by the Bahamas Locomotive Society
Yaxham	GB	Millfield	7070	1942	0-4-0CT	4 ft 8 1/2 in (1,435 mm)	Static display.
Tanfield Railway	GB		7078	1944	Bo-Bo	4 ft 8 1/2 in (1,435 mm)	Built for 500v DC overhead system at Kearsley Power Station
Embsay and Bolton Abbey Steam Railway	GB	Norman	7086	1943	0-6-0ST	4 ft 8 1/2 in (1,435 mm)	Undergoing overhaul; built as Austerity WD 75050
Strathspey Railway	GB		7097	1943	0-6-0ST	4 ft 8 1/2 in (1,435 mm)	Restoration started in 2019; built as Austerity WD 75061
Tanfield Railway	GB	NCB No. 49	7098	1943	0-6-0ST	4 ft 8 1/2 in (1,435 mm)	Operational (Returned to traffic July 2018, Boiler tickets expires 2028); built as Austerity WD 75062
Peak Rail	GB	Royal Pioneer	7136	1944	0-6-0ST	4 ft 8 1/2 in (1,435 mm)	Undergoing overhaul, built as Austerity WD 75186
Dean Forest Railway	GB	No. 152 Rennes	7139	1944	0-6-0ST	4 ft 8 1/2 in (1,435 mm)	Operational, painted in Longmoor Military Railway livery
Avon Valley Railway	GB		7151	1944	0-6-0T	4 ft 8 1/2 in (1,435 mm)	Stored awaiting overhaul.
Pontypool and Blaenavon Railway	GB	71515 Mechanical Navvy	7169	1945	0-6-0ST	4 ft 8 1/2 in (1,435 mm)	Withdrawn Sept. 2018; built as Austerity WD 71515
Gwili Railway	GB	Welsh Guardsman	7170	1944	0-6-0ST	4 ft 8 1/2 in (1,435 mm)	Operational following a return to service in 2014; built as Austerity WD 71516
Midland Railway - Butterley	GB	George	7214	1945	0-4-0ST	4 ft 8 1/2 in (1,435 mm)	Undergoing restoration
Colne Valley Railway	GB	Doug Tottman	7284	1945	Bo-Bo	4 ft 8 1/2 in (1,435 mm)	Built for Kearsley Power Station, rebuilt as battery electric for Heysham Power Station
Tyseley Locomotive Works	GB	Fred	7289	1945	0-6-0ST	4 ft 8 1/2 in (1,435 mm)	Built as Austerity WD 71480. Returned to steam in 2024 following overhaul at Tyseley.
National Coal Mining Museum	GB	Progress	7298	1946	0-6-0ST	4 ft 8 1/2 in (1,435 mm)	Static display
Elsecar Railway	GB	Birkenhead	7386	1948	0-4-0ST	4 ft 8 1/2 in (1,435 mm)	Undergoing overhaul
Tanfield Railway	GB	Sir Cecil A. Cochrane	7409	1948	0-4-0ST	4 ft 8 1/2 in (1,435 mm)	Operational
Private site	GB	Norwood	7412	1948	0-6-0ST	4 ft 8 1/2 in (1,435 mm)	Undergoing restoration off site
Museum of Science and Industry (Manchester)	GB	Agecroft No. 1	7416	1948	0-4-0ST	4 ft 8 1/2 in (1,435 mm)	Operational
Ribble Steam Railway	GB	Agecroft No. 2	7485	1947	0-4-0ST	4 ft 8 1/2 in (1,435 mm)	On static display awaiting overhaul
Mainline Steam Heritage Trust, Plimmerton, NZ	NZ	EW 1805	7491	1951	Bo-Bo-Bo	3 ft 6 in (1,067 mm)	New Zealand EW class electric
Canterbury Railway Society, Ferrymead Heritage Park, Christchurch, NZ	NZ	EW 1806	7492	1951	Bo-Bo-Bo	3 ft 6 in (1,067 mm)	New Zealand EW class locomotive
Snibston Discovery Park	GB	Mars No. 2	7493	1948	0-4-0ST	4 ft 8 1/2 in (1,435 mm)	Awaiting restoration
Battlefield Line Railway	GB	Richard III	7537	1949	0-6-0T	4 ft 8 1/2 in (1,435 mm)	Stored out of use
Lincolnshire Wolds Railway	GB	Zebedee	7597	1949	0-6-0T	4 ft 8 1/2 in (1,435 mm)	Undergoing overhaul
East Somerset Railway	GB	Meteor	7609	1950	0-6-0T	4 ft 8 1/2 in (1,435 mm)	Undergoing restoration
Didcot Railway Centre	GB	Bonnie Prince Charlie	7644	1951	0-4-0ST	4 ft 8 1/2 in (1,435 mm)	On static display awaiting overhaul. Used in title sequence of 1980s children's series The Saturday Banana.
Great Central Railway	GB	Nechells No. 4	7648	1951	0-6-0T	4 ft 8 1/2 in (1,435 mm)	Undergoing overhaul
Embsay and Bolton Abbey Steam Railway	GB	Beano	7661	1959	0-4-0	4 ft 8 1/2 in (1,435 mm)	Stored awaiting overhaul
Epping Ongar Railway	GB	56	7667	1950	0-6-0ST	4 ft 8 1/2 in (1,435 mm)	Stored awaiting overhaul
Spa Valley Railway	GB	Samson	7668	1950	0-6-0ST	4 ft 8 1/2 in (1,435 mm)	Restoration on hold
Colne Valley Railway	GB	Jupiter	7671	1951	0-6-0ST	4 ft 8 1/2 in (1,435 mm)	Built for the Corby Ironstone works. Undergoing overhaul
Spa Valley Railway	GB	Ugly	7673	1950	0-6-0ST	4 ft 8 1/2 in (1,435 mm)	Operational
Fulstow Steam Centre	GB	Fulstow	7680	1950	0-4-0ST	4 ft 8 1/2 in (1,435 mm)	Operational. Built for Leicester Power Station.
Whitwell and Reepham Railway	GB	Agecroft No. 3	7681	1951	0-4-0ST	4 ft 8 1/2 in (1,435 mm)	Undergoing overhaul
North Tyneside Steam Railway	GB	Meaford No.1	7683	1951	0-6-0T	4 ft 8 1/2 in (1,435 mm)	Robert Stephenson & Hawthorn No.1 on the crossover line Static display awaiting restoration
Tanfield Railway	GB	Beryl	7697	1953	0-6-0DM	4 ft 8 1/2 in (1,435 mm)	Awaiting repair
Garw Valley	GB	7705	7705	1952	0-4-0ST	4 ft 8 1/2 in (1,435 mm)	Undergoing restoration
La Grange Railroad Museum, La Grange, Kentucky	USA	Meaford No. 2 (Flying Duchess)	7745	1952	0-6-0T	4 ft 8 1/2 in (1,435 mm)	Static display
Tanfield Railway	GB	NCB No. 44	7760	1953	0-6-0ST	4 ft 8 1/2 in (1,435 mm)	Awaiting restoration
Epping Ongar Railway	GB	Corby	7761	1954	0-6-0ST	4 ft 8 1/2 in (1,435 mm)	Stored awaiting overhaul
Tanfield Railway	GB	NCB No. 38	7763	1954	0-6-0ST	4 ft 8 1/2 in (1,435 mm)	Awaiting overhaul
Weardale Railway	GB	NCB No. 40	7765	1954	0-6-0T	4 ft 8 1/2 in (1,435 mm)	Undergoing overhaul
Tanfield Railway	GB	CEGB No. 21	7797	1954	0-4-0ST	4 ft 8 1/2 in (1,435 mm)	Awaiting overhaul
Tanfield Railway	GB	No. 47	7800	1954	0-6-0ST	4 ft 8 1/2 in (1,435 mm)	Awaiting restoration, ex Celynen South Power Station
Midland Railway - Butterley	GB	Castle Donington Power Station No. 1	7817	1954	0-4-0ST	4 ft 8 1/2 in (1,435 mm)	Undergoing overhaul
Yaxham	GB	Castle Donington Power Station No. 2	7818	1954	0-4-0ST	4 ft 8 1/2 in (1,435 mm)	Awaiting overhaul
Tanfield Railway	GB	NCB No. 16	7944	1957	0-6-0ST	4 ft 8 1/2 in (1,435 mm)	Awaiting restoration
Dales Countryside Museum	GB	67345	7845	1955	0-6-0T	4 ft 8 1/2 in (1,435 mm)	On display, built for CEGB Hams Hall Power Station
Ferryhill Railway Heritage Trust	GB	North Downs	7846	1955	0-6-0T	4 ft 8 1/2 in (1,435 mm)	Under restoration - Boiler rebuilt
Gwili Railway	GB	Moorbarrow	7849	1955	0-6-0ST	4 ft 8 1/2 in (1,435 mm)	Undergoing overhaul
