= New South Wales 79 class locomotive =

Class of electric locomotives

New South Wales 79 class
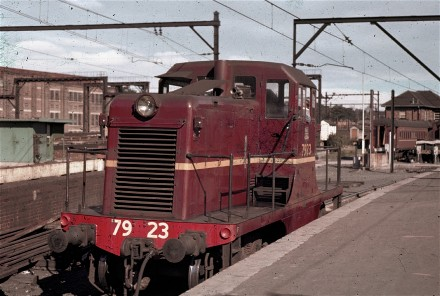
- 7923 at Sydney Central
Type and origin
- Power type: Diesel-electric
- Builder: General Electric
- Serial number: 17938, 17939, 17933, 17934
- Model: GE 44-ton switcher
- Build date: 1943
- Total produced: 4
- Rebuilder: FR Tulk, Perth
- Rebuild date: 1979
- Number rebuilt: 2
Specifications
- Configuration
  - UIC: Bo-Bo
- Gauge: 4 ft 8 1/2 in (1,435 mm) standard gauge
- Wheel diameter: 33 in (838 mm)
- Length: Over headstocks: 29 ft 10 in (9.09 m), Over buffers: 35 ft 2 in (10.72 m)
- Width: 9 ft 6 in (2.90 m)
- Height: 13 ft 2 1/8 in (4.02 m)
- Axle load: 9 long tons 16 cwt (22,000 lb or 10 t)
- Loco weight: 39 long tons 0 cwt (87,400 lb or 39.6 t)
- Fuel type: Diesel
- Fuel capacity: 210 imp gal (950 L; 250 US gal)
- Lubricant cap.: 32 imp gal (150 L; 38 US gal) per engine
- Coolant cap.: 40 imp gal (180 L; 48 US gal) per engine
- Sandbox cap.: 8 cu ft (0.23 m^{3})
- Prime mover: Caterpillar D17000, 2 of
- RPM range: 350–1000
- Engine type: Four-stroke V8 diesel
- Aspiration: Normally aspirated
- Generator: General Electric GT 555A
- Traction motors: General Electric 733, 4 of
- Cylinders: 8
- Cylinder size: 5.75 in × 8 in (146 mm × 203 mm)
Performance figures
- Maximum speed: 35 mph (56 km/h)
- Power output: Gross: 190 hp (142 kW) per engine For traction: 175 hp (130 kW) per engine
- Tractive effort: Continuous: 13,000 lbf (57.83 kN) at 7.5 mph (12.1 km/h)
Career
- Number in class: 4
- Numbers: 7920–7923
- Delivered: 1943
- Preserved: 7921, 7922
- Disposition: 2 preserved, 2 unknown

The 79 class is a diesel-electric locomotive built by General Electric, Erie, United States for the Department of Railways New South Wales in 1943.

== Importation ==
In 1943, during World War II, four diesel-electric industrial shunting type locomotives built by General Electric Company, Erie for the United States Army Transportation Corps (USATC) were imported from the United States of America by the Department of Supply under Lend-Lease conditions for use at the Dunheved munitions factory in Sydney. They were four units of 58 units built for the USATC by General Electric numbered 8499-8528 & 7900-7929.

Before entering service in New South Wales, the 4 locos were fitted with buffers and chain coupler to NSWGR standards. The cab profile was also altered to fit within the New South Wales loading gauge. It seems that only one unit was used at the Dunheved facility. Being of the hood type, with a central cab, they could work in either direction without turning.

== Operations ==
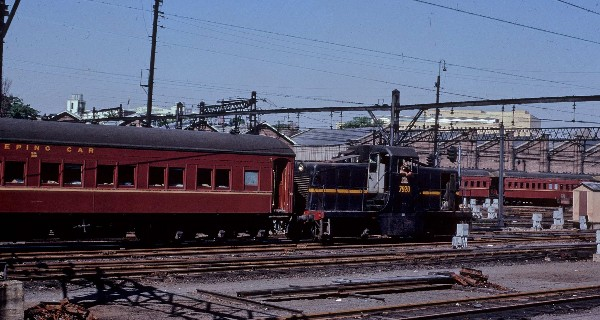
7920 in Sydney Yard in September 1969

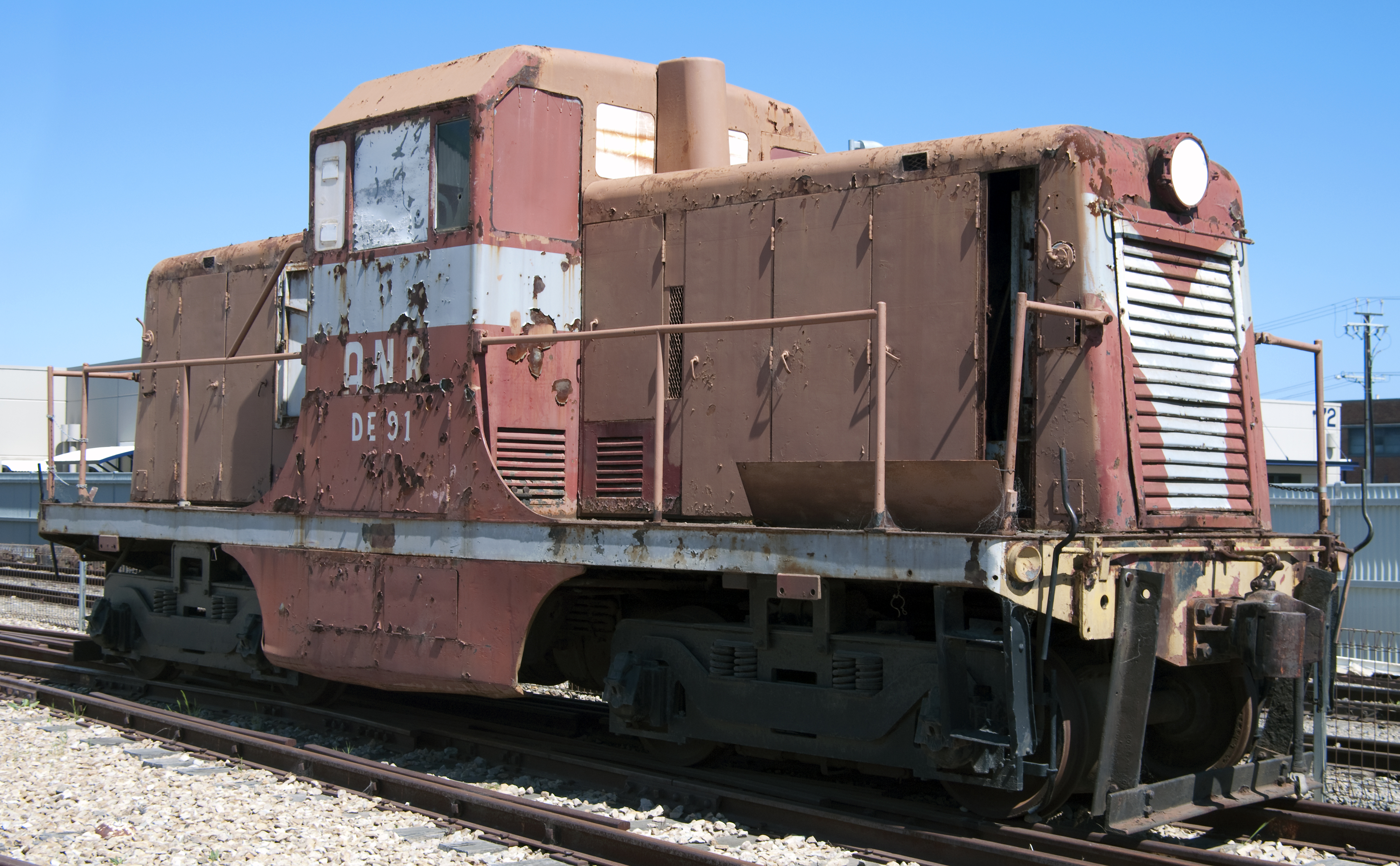
DE91 (ex 7922) at the National Railway Museum, Port Adelaide in October 2010

In 1945, the BHP became interested in the possible dieselisation at its Australian Iron & Steel works in Port Kembla and one unit was loaned to the company in April. Whilst it proved too light for the tasks of hauling ingots and ladles, it did lead to the commencement of dieselisation five years later.

At the end of that war, they were put into use by the New South Wales Department of Railways as shunters at Sydney Central station and Eveleigh Carriage Workshops. They were numbered 7920 to 7923, these being the numbers allocated by US authorities. In April 1948, the Commonwealth Government took 7921 and 7922 for use at Woomera Rocket Range and 7920 and 7923 were purchased by the NSWGR in September that year.

In 1950, the two owned by the Commonwealth Government were transferred to Commonwealth Railways as the DE Class and used as shunters at Port Augusta and Port Pirie. In July 1975, both were included in the transfer of the Commonwealth Railways to Australian National.

== Disposal & preservation ==
In October 1974, the two NSWGR units were sold to the British Phosphate Commission for use on Christmas Island. In 1979, both were rebuilt by FR Tulk, Perth with Caterpillar D3306 engines and lower profile noses. This railway closed in 1987.

Following the retirement of the Commonwealth Railways units in the early 1980s, 7921 returned to New South Wales and is preserved at the NSW Rail Museum, Thirlmere, while 7922 is with the National Railway Museum, Port Adelaide.
