= GE 44-ton switcher =

Diesel-electric switcher locomotive (Built 1940-1956)

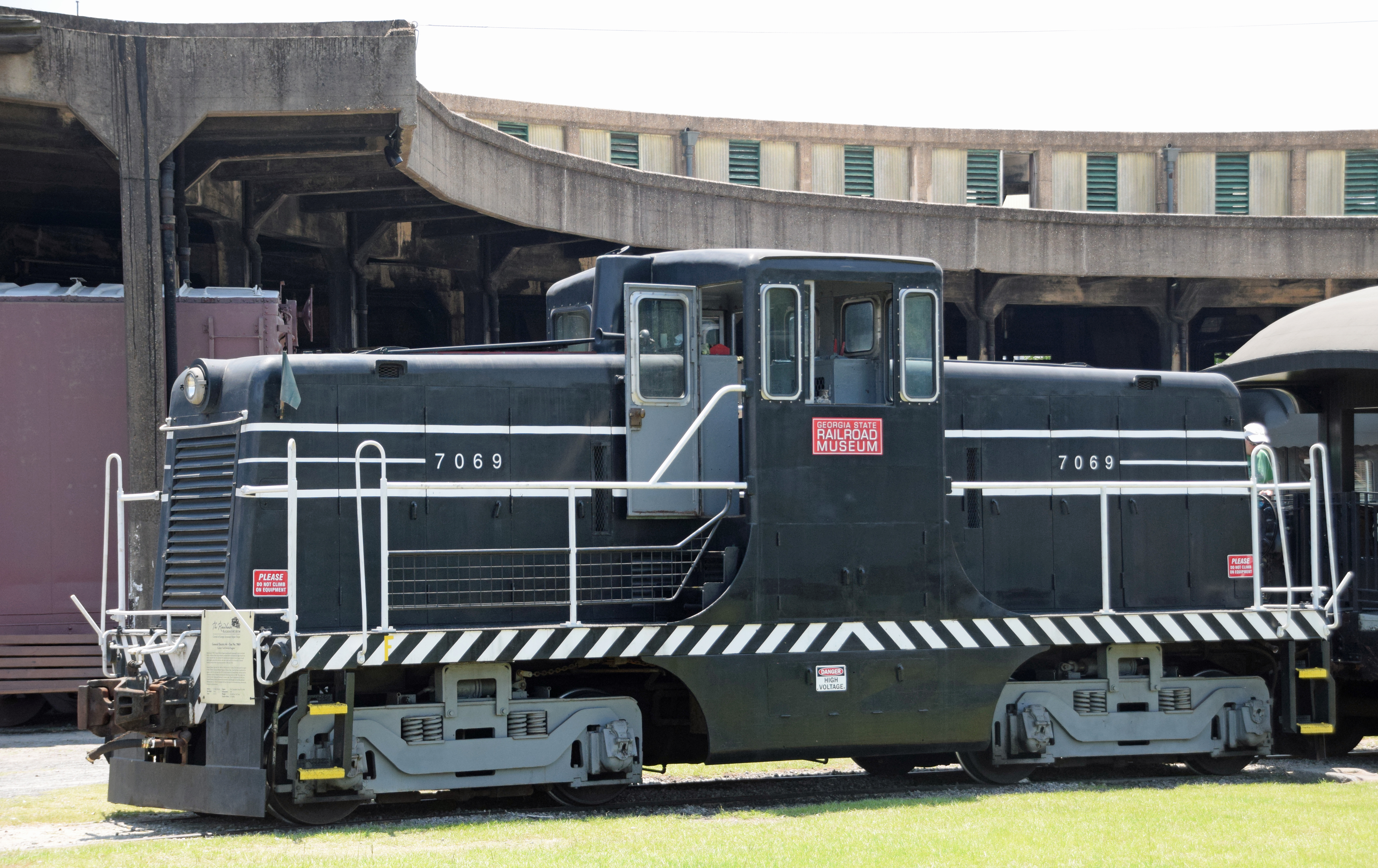
- Engine 7069 at the Georgia State Railroad Museum, Savannah, Georgia
Type and origin
- Power type: Diesel-electric
- Builder: GE Transportation Systems
- Model: 44-ton switcher
- Build date: September 1940–October 1956
- Total produced: 386
Specifications
- Configuration
  - AAR: B-B
  - UIC: Bo′Bo'
- Gauge: 4 ft 8 1/2 in (1,435 mm) standard gauge
- Loco weight: 44 short tons (39 long tons; 40 t)
- Prime mover: Pair of Caterpillar D17000 standard, also Hercules DFXD (9 locomotives); Buda Engine Co. 6DH1742 (10 locomotives); Caterpillar D342 (4 locomotives).
- RPM range: D17000: 1,000 (max); 6DH1742: 1,050 (max); DFXD: 1,600 (max); D342: 1,200 (max)
- Engine type: D17000: V8 diesel All others: Inline-6 diesel
- Aspiration: Naturally aspirated
- Traction motors: Four
- Cylinders: D17000: 8 All others: 6
- Cylinder size: D17000: 5.75 in × 8 in (146 mm × 203 mm); 6DH1742: 6.5 in × 8.375 in (165 mm × 213 mm); DFXD: 5.5 in × 6 in (139.700 mm × 152.400 mm); D342: 5.75 in × 8 in (146.050 mm × 203.200 mm)
Performance figures
- Maximum speed: 35 mph (56 km/h)
- Power output: 360 to 400 hp (270 to 300 kW)
- Tractive effort: 27,000 lbf (120.1 kN) @ 30%
Career
- Locale: North America, Australia, Saudi Arabia, South America, India, France, Sweden .

The GE 44-ton switcher is a four-axle diesel-electric locomotive built by General Electric between 1940 and 1956. It was designed for industrial and light switching duties, often replacing steam locomotives that had previously been assigned these chores.

This locomotive's specific 44-short ton weight was directly related to one of the efficiencies the new diesel locomotives offered compared to their steam counterparts: reduced labor intensity. In the 1940s, the steam to diesel transition was in its infancy in North America, and railroad unions were trying to protect the locomotive fireman jobs that were redundant with diesel units. One measure taken to this end was the 1937 so-called "90,000 Pound Rule," a stipulation that locomotives weighing 90,000 pounds (41,000 kg) – 45 short tons – or more required a fireman in addition to an engineer on common carrier railroads. Industrial and military railroads had no such stipulation. The 44-ton locomotive was designed to abrogate this requirement. Other manufacturers like Davenport and Whitcomb also built 44-ton switchers for this reason.

GE built 276 of this locomotive for U.S. railroads and industrial concerns, four were exported to Australia in 1944, ten were exported to Canada, ten to Cuba, one to the Dominican Republic, five to France, three to India, six to Mexico, five to Saudi Arabia, one to Sweden, two to Trinidad, ten to Uruguay, and fifty-seven were built for the United States Armed Forces. Many remain, in service and in museums.

== Prime mover options ==
The locomotives were available with a choice of prime movers. Most were built with a pair of Caterpillar's D17000 V8 180 horsepower (134 kW) engines, but three other engine types were used. Nine were built with a pair of Hercules DFXD engines; two were sold to Chattanooga Traction and seven were sold to Missouri Pacific Railroad and its subsidiaries. Ten were built with a pair of the slightly more powerful Buda 6DH1742, rated at 200 horsepower (150 kW) each. The last four locomotives built had Caterpillar D342 engines, of which three were sold to Canadian National Railway and one to the Dansville and Mount Morris Railroad.

== Military version ==
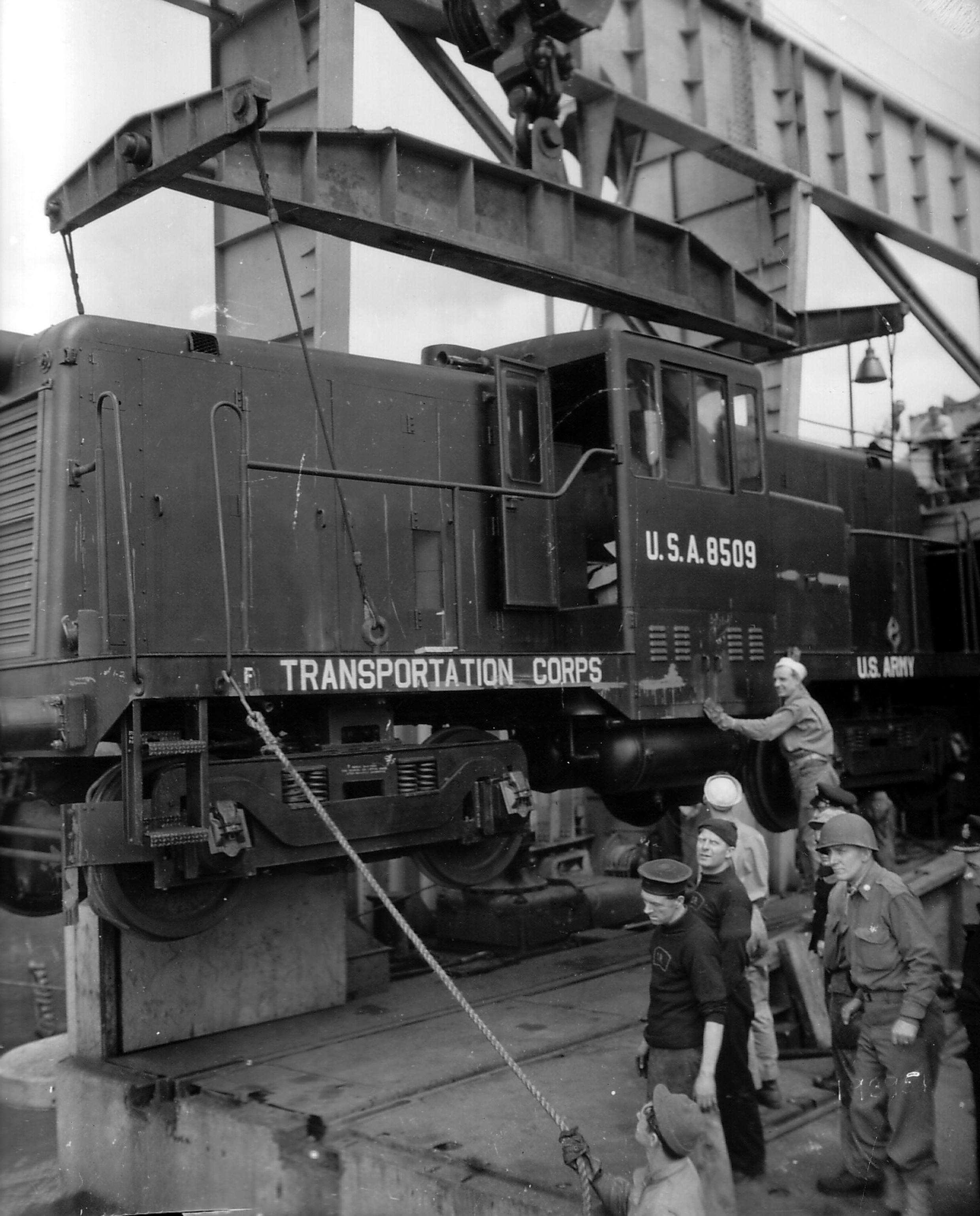
U.S. Army GE 44-ton being unloaded at Cherbourg, July 1944.

During the Second World War, GE produced a "Drop Cab" variant of the 44-ton locomotives for the US Armed Forces. These appeared similar to the standard 44-ton but had a lower cab for European clearances, and large boxes next to the cab, on the front right, and back left running boards, housing the air compressors (housed under the cab on standard versions). Most of these military variants were ballasted to an actual weight of 45 tons. A total of 91 Military 45-ton Drop Cabs were built with 31 of those sold to the Indian Railways. Additional narrow gauge drop cabs were built to a 47-ton rating for the military and export.

Twelve Drop Cab 45-ton locomotives were bought by the Portuguese Railway (CP - Caminhos de Ferro Portugueses) in 1949, with the Iberian broad gauge of 1,668 mm (5 ft 5 21/32 in). Numbered 1101 to 1112, after some initial use as light road engines, they spent most of their lives as switchers at the southern region main stations. The series is withdrawn but one example is preserved (No. 1104) at the National Railroad Museum (Fundação Museu Nacional Ferroviário Armando Ginestal Machado) at Entroncamento.

== Australia ==
Four were obtained under Lend-Lease by the Commonwealth Department of Munitions, St Marys, Sydney. After the war, all saw service with the New South Wales Government Railways as the 79 class numbered 7920 - 7923. In April 1945, 7922 was trialed by Australian Iron & Steel at its Port Kembla steelworks.

Two, 7921 and 7922 were reclaimed by the Federal Government and sent to South Australia hauling trains between Port Pirie and the Woomera Rocket Range. In July 1950, both were transferred to the Commonwealth Railways as DE90 and DE91 for use at Port Pirie and Port Augusta.

In 1974, 7920 and 7923 were sold by the Public Transport Commission to the British Phosphate Commission for use on Christmas Island.

== Preserved examples ==
=== United States ===
- Arcade and Attica Railroad in Arcade, NY shifted all operations to diesel in 1941 with the purchase of 44ton No 110. Six years later a wreck forced them to send the engine back to Erie for repairs. At that time they purchased a second engine (ARA No 111) and scrapped their last remaining backup steam engine. ARA 110 today is a static display while ARA 111 remains operational for freight duties as a backup locomotive, occasionally hauling the railroad's excursion trains (often triple-headed with the railroad's other two GE centercab switchers for their annual WWII weekend, #112 and #113). Freight duties are currently handled in tandem by 65-ton #112 (1945 b/n 27886, U.S. Navy, acquired 1988) and 80-ton #113 (1959 b/n 33489, ConEdison, acquired 2014). The railroad acquired an ALCO RS-3m in 2023 to replace their center cab locomotives.
- The Burlington Junction Railway of Burlington, IA owns an ex-Washington and Old Dominion Railroad, Fonda, Johnstown and Gloversville Railroad and Great Western Railway of Colorado 44 tonner (BJRY 44) that operates about once a month in West Burlington, Iowa.
- The California State Railroad Museum in Old Sacramento runs the Sacramento Southern Railroad Number 1240, formerly the U.S. Air Force Number 1240 out of McClellan Air Force Base.
- The Charlotte Southern in Charlotte, MI. operates the last 44 ton GE ever built. Ex-Danville & Mount Morris #1. List in the Diesel Spotters Guide (Kalmbach Publishing).
- The Chehalis-Centralia Railroad operates former Puget Sound Naval Shipyard #6. The locomotive is used for yard switching, MOW, and as a backup.
- The Cumbres and Toltec Scenic Railroad operates two 3-foot gauge 44 tonners for switching and maintenance, numbered 15 and 19, which came from the Oahu Railway and Land Company.
- The Danbury Railway Museum in Danbury, CT has two of these locos one under restoration (ex New Haven Railroad) and one currently operational (ex Union Pacific)
- The Delaware & Ulster Railroad currently has former Western Maryland 76 in storage at their yard in Arkville, New York.
- The Florida Gulf Coast Railroad Museum in Parrish, Florida owns and operates former US Navy 65-00345, originally assigned to NAS Jacksonville.
- The Heber Valley Railroad in Heber City, UT has one of these in operation giving daily tourist trips down Provo Canyon in Utah
- The New York Ontario & Western Railroad Historical Society, Owns one, NYO&W #105. Currently being Repaired & Restored for Operation by the end of 2018. It is at Steamtown National Historic Site, in Scranton, Pennsylvania. This unit was SRNJ #105 Prior to 2017, when the NYO&WHS had acquired it, and it was transported by truck to Scranton.
- The North Florida Railway Museum has 44-Tonner #12945 on display in Reynolds Industrial Park located, Green Cove Springs, FL. The locomotive is currently being cosmetically and mechanically restored.
- The Pacific Locomotive Association in Sunol, California owns ATSF 462 which is out of service awaiting restoration. It is stored at Niles Canyon Railway's Brightside Yard in Niles Canyon, CA.
- The Portsmouth Naval Shipyard still operates USN 65-00566.
- The Media:The Railway Museum of San Angelo in San Angelo, TX displays the GE 44 ton repainted and lettered in Santa Fe Tiger Strips as number 461 was formerly the U.S. Air Force 1241, serial number 31879, formerly based at Carswell Air Force Base, Texas. Build date February 1953.
- The Southern Michigan Railroad Society in Clinton, MI operates former Western Maryland Railway unit #75 on tourist trips between Clinton, Tecumseh, and Raisin Center along the former Jacksonburgh and Palmyra Railroad. It also preserves former Detroit and Mackinac Railway #10.
- The Southern Railroad of New Jersey currently rosters two 44-tonners. Numbers 410 & 412
- The Stewartstown Railroad operates a former Coudersport & Port Allegheny 44 tonner.
- The Timber Heritage Association in Samoa, California owns the Arcata and Mad River #101, a 44 tonner which used to haul lumber loads from Korbel to Arcata, California on the Arcata and Mad River Railroad. This unit is operational, and is part of the planned Humboldt Bay Scenic Railroad for tourists using the non-operational Northwestern Pacific Railroad around Humboldt Bay.
- The Toledo, Lake Erie, and Western owns one Whitcomb 44-tonner, #1, Ex-Dundee Cement 951901, and née-Ann Arbor Railroad #1. Currently, it is sitting in its yard in Grand Rapids, Ohio, along with a Baldwin 0-6-0 steam locomotive. Both are currently being restored.
- The Tri-State Railway Historical Society owns Hoboken Shore Railroad No. 700. The locomotive was acquired from the Tyburn Railroad in Morrisville, PA, in 2021. It was relocated to Boonton, NJ, in early 2022, where it is stored and operable. The locomotive is awaiting a restoration to its Hoboken Shore colors.
- The Walkersville Southern Railroad currently has three 44 tonners; those being Great Northern #51, Former Strasburg/Pennsylvania Railroad 9331, and Former Pennsylvania 9339. Three additional examples are expected to arrive on the property by the fall of 2020. Currently, two are privately owned ex-Pennsylvania Railroad 44-tonners, 9339, acquired from the South Carolina Railroad Museum in 2011 and ex-PRR 44-Tonner 9331, acquired form Strasburg Railroad in 2013.
- The Western Pacific Railroad Museum at Portola, California is the home of Quincy Railroad 3. No. 3 was leased by the Virginia and Truckee Railroad in Virginia City, Nevada in 2002 when its two steam locomotives went down for restoration. It was sent back when the railroad got another GE switcher. This 44 ton engine replaced steam power on this shortline railroad. The WPRM is also home to Quincy 4, an Alco S1 switcher that replaced QRR 3. The WPRM recently received a donation of 44 tonner Tidewater Southern 735.
- Roots of Motive Power in Willits, California, owns and operates former Arcata & Mad River #104, a GE 44 tonner built in 1945.

=== Canada ===
- Southern Prairie Railway in Ogema, Saskatchewan, Canada has purchased former Maine Central Railroad #15 from Conway Scenic Railway in New Hampshire and intends to use the 1945 44-tonner to offer tourist trips down the Red Coat Line in Southern Saskatchewan.
- The Musquodoboit Harbour Railway Museum in Musquodoboit Harbour, Nova Scotia features a former Canadian National Railways 44-ton unit.
- Port Stanley Terminal Rail, operating out of Port Stanley, Ontario, rosters one example. Serial number 28349, formerly of the Greater Winnipeg Water District, is number L3 and named 'Winnie'.

=== Sweden ===
- The two 44-tonners from the ironworks in Hofors and Domnarvet are preserved by a railway society in Falun, Dalarna.

=== Australia ===
- 7921 which was sold to the Commonwealth Railways as DE90 is preserved by the NSW Rail Museum at Thrilmere
- 7922 which was sold to the Commonwealth Railways is preserved at the National Railway Museum, Port Adelaide

=== Spain ===
Hunosa Nº2, which used to work at the Sueros Coal Washing Facility in Mieres, Asturias, is in operational condition at the Asturian Railway Museum in Gijón, Asturias.
