= List of preserved H. K. Porter locomotives =

A large quantity of locomotives constructed by the H. K. Porter Company have been preserved in museums, on tourist railroads, and various other locations.

== 0-4-0 ==
Photograph	Works no.	Locomotive	Build date	Class	Wheel arrangement	Disposition	Location	Notes	References
	84	Northern Pacific #1 "Minnetonka"	1870		0-4-0ST+T	On static display	Lake Superior Railroad Museum in Duluth, Minnesota		
	1726	Carnegie Steel 14	April 1897	-	0-4-0T	On static display	Age of Steam Roundhouse Museum in Sugarcreek, Ohio		
	2396	Marion River Carry Railroad #2	1901	-	0-4-0ST	On static display	Adirondack Experience in Blue Mountain Lake, New York.	Lettered "Raquette Lake Trans. Co."	
	3077	Sharon Steel Hoop Co. 4	1904		0-4-0	On static display	Huntsville Depot Museum in Huntsville, Alabama		
	4390	Santa Cruz Portland Cement 2	1909		0-4-0T	Operational	California Western Railroad/The Skunk Train in Fort Bragg, California		
	5731	Compressed Air 1	November 1915	("Pneumatic – 3 storage tanks")	0-4-0F	On static display	Age of Steam Roundhouse Museum in Sugarcreek, Ohio		
	6571	Marquette Cement Company #2	1923		0-4-0T	On static display	Arena Park in Cape Girardeau, Missouri		
	6596	BHP No. 16	1920	-	0-4-0T	On static display	Corner of Mamre Rd & Hall St in St Marys, New South Wales, Australia	Maintained by the Vietnam Veterans Association of Australia.	
	7171	Koppers 1	1931	-	0-4-0T	Operational	White Mountain Central Railroad in Lincoln, New Hampshire		
	7250	Bullard Company 2	October 1937	-	0-4-0ST	On static display	Steamtown National Historic Site in Scranton, Pennsylvania		
	7319	US Navy #7	June 1941	-	0-4-0F	Stored	Rio Grande Scenic Railroad in Alamosa, Colorado		
	-	CCCo. #3	1930	-	0-4-0F	On static display	Valley Railroad in Essex, Connecticut.		

=== Narrow gauge ===
Photograph	Works no.	Locomotive	Build date	Class	Gauge	Wheel arrangement	Disposition	Location	Notes	References
	920	Arizona Copper Co. #5	1888	-	-	0-4-0T	On static display	Morenci, Arizona		
	2993	ADCo. #1	1903	-	3 ft	0-4-0ST	On static display	Pedestrian Island in Acajutla, El Salvador	Nicknamed "La Burra"	
	4468	Yellow Aster #3	1909	Modified B-S	-	0-4-0ST	Sold to the Big Butte Mine in Randsburg for use as a stationary boiler	Rand Desert Museum, Randsburg, California		
	5190	Armour & Co. #5	November 1912	-	3 ft	0-4-0	Stored, under ownership of Greg Beason	Amory, Mississippi		
	7244	J&LS #58	July 1937	-	-	0-4-0T	Operational	Youngstown Steel Heritage Museum in Youngstown, Ohio		
	7245	J&LS #57	July 1937	-	-	0-4-0T	Undergoing restoration to operating condition	J&L Narrow Gauge Railway in Youngstown, Ohio		
	7299	J&LS #59	April 1941	-	-	0-4-0T	Stored	J&L Narrow Gauge Railway in Youngstown, Ohio		
	7613	J&LS #60	March 1944	-	-	0-4-0T	Undergoing restoration to operating condition	Youngstown Steel Heritage Museum in Youngstown, Ohio		
	8147	J&LS #62	October 1947	-	-	0-4-0T	Awaiting restoration	Youngstown Steel Heritage Museum in Youngstown, Ohio		
	-	H.K. Porter #1	1921	-	3 ft 4 in	0-4-0T	-	Railroad Museum of Long Island in Long Island, New York	Named "Roy Dunwell"	

== 0-4-4 ==
Photograph	Works no.	Locomotive	Build date	Class	Gauge	Wheel arrangement	Disposition	Location	Notes	References
	4322	HM #22	1909	-	18 inch	0-4-4	Operational	Maritime Heritage Center in Anacortes, Washington		
	5938	VSCo. #3	1917	-	3 ft	0-4-4+T	On static display	Transportation Museum, Parque del Este in Caracas, Venezuela		

== 0-6-0 ==
Photograph	Works no.	Locomotive	Build date	Class	Wheel arrangement	Disposition	Location	Notes	References
	5966	BEDT #15	March 1917	ST	0-6-0ST	Operational	Strasburg Rail Road in Strasburg, Pennsylvania.		
	6260	BEDT #14	September 1920	-	0-6-0ST	On static display	Ulster & Delaware Railroad Historical Society in Arkville, New York.		
	6368	BEDT #12	March 1919	-	0-6-0T	On static display	Florida Railroad Museum in Parrish, Florida		
	6369	US Navy #4	March 1919	-	0-6-0T	On static display	Age of Steam Roundhouse Museum in Sugarcreek, Ohio	Operated for the BEDT as their number 13.	
	6780	BEDT #16	January 1923	-	0-6-0ST	On static display	Railroad Museum of Long Island in Long Island, New York		
	6816	Public Service Electric & Gas Co. #6816	1923		0-6-0F	On static display	Steamtown National Historic Site in Scranton, Pennsylvania		
	7059	GWSCo. #3	1928	-	0-6-0ST	On static display	World Museum of Mining in Butte, Montana.		
	7161	WK&S #65	1930	-	0-6-0ST	Undergoing overhaul	Wanamaker, Kempton and Southern Railroad (WK&SR) in Kempton, Pennsylvania.		
	7350	CEICo. #7	April 1943	-	0-6-0F	On static display	Mad River & NKP Railroad Museum in Bellevue, Ohio		
	7367	FPCCo. #7	1942	-	0-6-0ST	On static display	New Braunfels Railroad Museum in New Braunfels, Texas		
	7510	JŽ 62-084	1942	JŽ class 62	0-6-0T	On static display	Gračac, Croatia		
	7529	SEK Δα53		USATC S100 Class	0-6-0T		Thessaloniki, Greece		
	7544	Benxi Steel XK2 28/US Army #1430	1943	Benxi Steel Class XK2	0-6-0T	Stored	Benxi Steel Works in Benxi, Liaoning, China		
	7461	Granite Rock Co. 10	August 1942	USATC S100 Class	0-6-0T	Operational	California State Railroad Museum in Sacramento, California		
	7462	EJ Lavino & Co 2		USATC S100 Class	0-6-0T		U.S. Army Transportation Museum in Fort Eustis, Virginia		
	7466	Oklahoma Gas & Electric 5		USATC S100 Class	0-6-0T		Oklahoma Railway Museum in Oklahoma City		
	7488			USATC S100 Class	0-6-0T		Goldfield, Nevada		
	7499	Albermarle Paper Co 1		USATC S100 Class	0-6-0T		Old Dominion Chapter NRHS		
	7584	JŽ 62-046	1942	JŽ class 62	0-6-0T	On static display	Chemin de fer touristique Haut Quercy, Martel, France		
	7593	Georgia Power Company 97		USATC S100 Class	0-6-0T		Southeastern Railway Museum in Duluth, Georgia		
	7682	SNCF 030.TU.13		SNCF 030.TU	0-6-0T		Saint Pierre du Regard, France		
	-	Simons Wrecking #2	1941	-	0-6-0ST	On static display	Valley Railroad in Essex, Connecticut.		

=== Narrow gauge ===
Photograph	Works no.	Locomotive	Build date	Class	Gauge	Wheel arrangement	Disposition	Location	Notes	References
	7117	Louisville Cement Co. #13	September 1928	-	1,000 mm (3 ft 3 3/8 in)	0-6-0TT	On static display	Thresherman Park in Boonville, Indiana		
	-1790	-barker and lepine sugar cane company	1897	-	3 ft (914 mm)	2-6-2	operational	pacific coast railroad		

== 0-6-2 ==
Photograph	Works no.	Locomotive	Build date	Class	Wheel arrangement	Disposition	Location	Notes	References
	3856	Ferrocarril Carrizal #5	1907	-	0-6-2T	Stored	Baldwin-Lima-Hamilton Locomotive Works (Brook Rother) at Georgetown, California		

== 0-6-4 ==
Photograph	Works no.	Locomotive	Build date	Class	Wheel arrangement	Disposition	Location	Notes	References
	4969	Godchaux Sugar #7	November 1911	-	0-6-4T	Stored	Baldwin-Lima-Hamilton Locomotive Works (Brook Rother) at Georgetown, California		

== 2-4-0 ==
Photograph	Works no.	Locomotive	Build date	Class	Wheel arrangement	Disposition	Location	Notes	References
	7211	Western Pennsylvania Power #7	1924	-	2-4-0	On static display	Heritage Park in McDonough, Georgia		

=== Narrow gauge ===
Photograph	Works no.	Locomotive	Build date	Class	Gauge	Wheel arrangement	Disposition	Location	Notes	References
	2634	Carnegie-Illinois Steel Company #10	September 1902	-	2 ft (610 mm)	2-4-0	On static display	Railstar in Watertown, New York		
	4099	Vaccarro Railroad #9	1908	-	3 ft (914 mm)	2-4-0	On static display	Parque Swinford in La Ceiba, Atlántida, Honduras		
	5904	Roden Stone Co. #3	July 1919	-	3 ft 6 in (1,067 mm)	2-4-0	On static display	Branson Toy Museum in Branson, Missouri		
	7036	West Midland Uruguay Railway #6	1926	-	3 ft (914 mm)	2-4-0	Undergoing a cosmetic restoration	Nikkō, Tochigi, Japan		
	7084	Cedar Point and Lake Erie #2 B.C. Holt	March 1940	-	3 ft (914 mm)	2-4-0	Stored	Garner Holt Productions in San Bernardino, California		
	7348	Cedar Point and Lake Erie #4 George R	March 1942	-	3 ft (914 mm)	2-4-0	Operational	Cedar Point Amusement Park in Sandusky, Ohio		
	7397	Carbon Limestone Co. #1 Anaka	February 1943	-	3 ft (914 mm)	2-4-0	scrapped 2026	Lahaina, Kaanapali and Pacific Railroad in Lahaina, Hawaii		
	7397	Carbon Limestone Co. #3 Myrtle	February 1943	-	3 ft (914 mm)	2-4-0	Scrapped 2026	Lahaina, Kaanapali and Pacific Railroad in Lahaina, Hawaii		
	7567	Tennessee Coal, Iron and Railroad Company #110	March 1944	-	3 ft (914 mm)	2-4-0	On static display	Dollywood in Pigeon Forge, Tennessee		

== 2-4-2 ==
Photograph	Works no.	Locomotive	Build date	Class	Wheel arrangement	Disposition	Location	Notes	References
	6557	Cherokee Brick & Tile #1	1920	-	2-4-2	On static display	Cowan Railroad Museum in Cowan, Tennessee		
	7995	St. Louis, Iron Mountain and Southern Railway 5	June 1946	-	2-4-2	Awaiting overhaul	St. Louis, Iron Mountain and Southern Railway in Jackson, Missouri		

== 2-6-0 ==
Photograph	Works no.	Locomotive	Build date	Class	Wheel arrangement	Disposition	Location	Notes	References
	368	Yoshitsune (7105)	April 1880	JGR Class 7100	2-6-0	Operational	Kyoto Railway Museum, Kyoto, Japan		
	369	Benkei (7101)	April 1880	JGR Class 7100	2-6-0	On static display	The Railway Museum, Saitama, Japan		
	672	Shizuka (7106)	January 1885	JGR Class 7100	2-6-0	On static display	Otaru City General Museum, Otaru, Hokkaido, Japan		

== 2-6-2 ==
Photograph	Works no.	Locomotive	Build date	Class	Wheel arrangement	Disposition	Location	Notes	References
	6877	MacMillan Bloedel Ltd. #1044	May 1924	-	2-6-2T	On static display	Chemainus, British Columbia		

== 2-8-2 ==
Photograph	Works no.	Locomotive	Build date	Class	Wheel arrangement	Disposition	Location	Notes	References
	6860	Mt. Rainier Scenic Railroad 5	February 1924	-	2-8-2	Undergoing restoration to operating condition	Mt. Rainier Scenic Railroad in Elbe, Washington		

== 4-6-0 ==
Photograph	Works no.	Locomotive	Build date	Class	Wheel arrangement	Disposition	Location	Notes	References
	5484	CSCCo. #3	December 1913	-	4-6-0	On static display	Pioneer Florida Museum in Dade City, Florida		

== 4-8-2 ==
=== Narrow gauge ===
Photograph	Works no.	Locomotive	Build date	Class	Gauge	Wheel arrangement	Disposition	Location	Notes	References
	8131	FNC #124	1948	-	3 ft (914 mm)	4-8-2	On static display	Palacio de la Cultura Romulo Rozo in Chiquinquirá, Colombia		
	8132	FNC #125	1948	-	3 ft (914 mm)	4-8-2	Stored	Facatativá, Colombia		
	8137	FC #128	1948	-	3 ft (914 mm)	4-8-2	On static display	Old Railway Station in Neiva, Huila, Andean, Colombia		

== Diesel locomotives ==
Photograph	Works no.	Locomotive	Build date	Class	Disposition	Location	Notes	References
	7391	Notre Dame and Western 5332	1942	65-tonner	On static display	Hoosier Valley Railroad Museum in North Judson, Indiana		
	8096	East Broad Top 19	1946	80-tonner	Operational	East Broad Top Railroad in Rockhill Furnace, Pennsylvania		
	8157	San Diego and Arizona 8751	March 1948	25-tonner	Operational	Pacific Southwest Railway Museum in Campo, California		
