= JGR Class 7100 =

Japanese type 2-6-0 steam locomotive

Class 7100
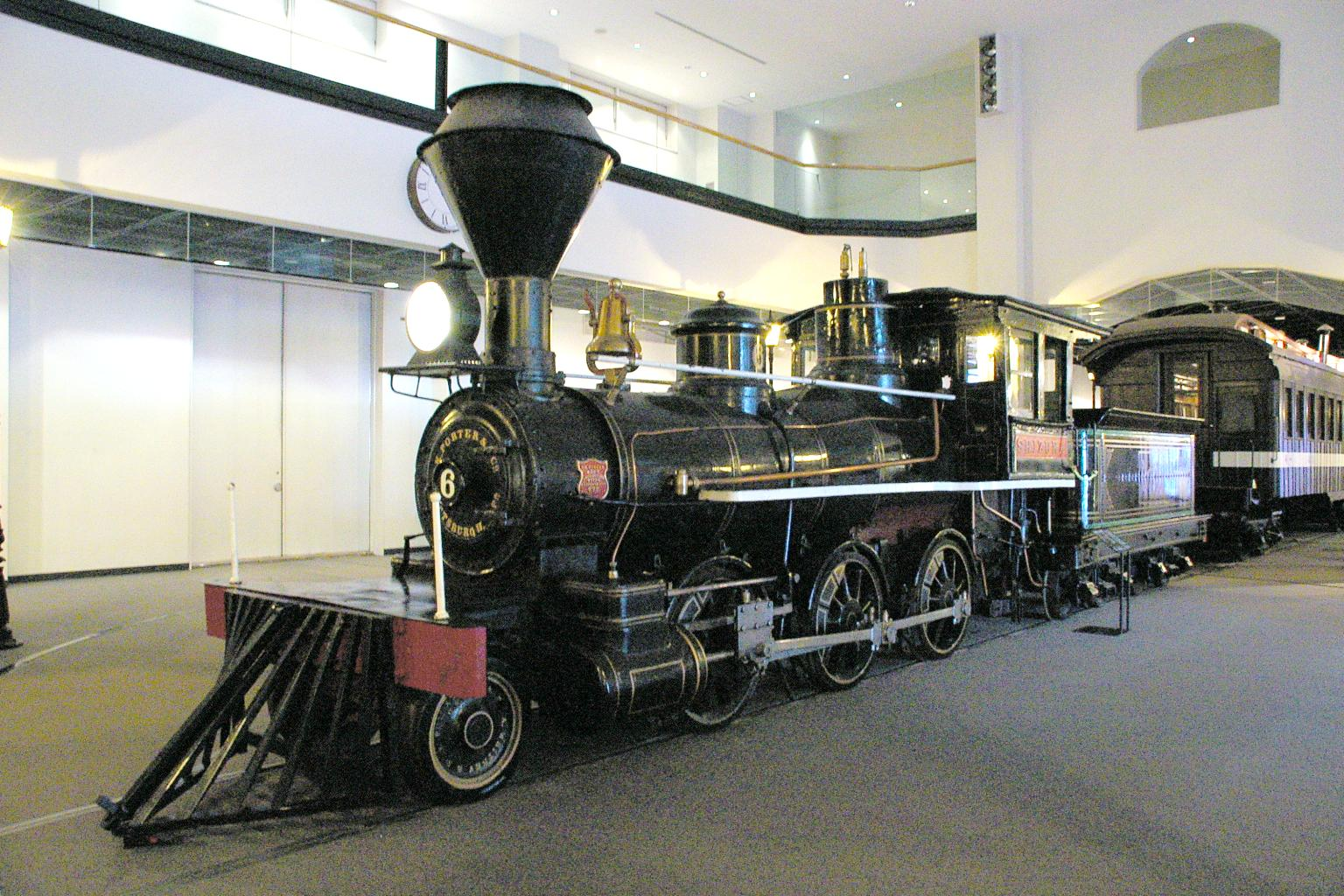
- No.7106 "Shizuka" of 1884, exhibited in Otaru City General Museum
Type and origin
- Power type: Steam
- Builder: H. K. Porter, Inc
- Build date: 1880–89
- Total produced: 8
Specifications
- Configuration
  - Whyte: 2-6-0
  - UIC: 1-C
- Gauge: 1,067 mm (3 ft 6 in)
- Driver dia.: 3 ft (914 mm)
- Length: 12,173 mm (39 ft 11.3 in)
- Height: 3,394 mm (11 ft 1.6 in)
- Axle load: 4.84 t (4.76 long tons; 5.34 short tons)
- Adhesive weight: 13.84 t (13.62 long tons; 15.26 short tons)
- Loco weight: 23 long tons 8 cwt (52,400 lb or 23.8 t)
- Fuel type: Coal
- Fuel capacity: 1.5 t (1.5 long tons; 1.7 short tons)
- Water cap.: 3.64 m^{3} (129 cu ft)
- Firebox
  - Grate area: 40.6 m^{2} (437 sq ft)
- Boiler pressure: 7.71 kgf/cm^{2} (756 kPa; 109.7 psi)
- Heating surface
  - Firebox: 52 sq ft (4.8 m^{2})
  - Tubes: 310 sq ft (29 m^{2})
- Cylinders: Two, outside
- Cylinder size: 305 mm × 406 mm (12 in × 16 in)
- Valve gear: Stephenson
Performance figures
- Tractive effort: 5,160 lbf (22.95 kN)
Career
- Operators: Hironai Railway, Hokkaidō Colliery and Railway Company, Japanese Government Railways, Hokkaidō governmental construction bureau
- Class: JNR 7100
- Locale: Japan
- Withdrawn: 1915-50
- Preserved: Nos. 7105 (1), 7101 (2), 7106 (6)
- Disposition: Three preserved, remainder scrapped

The JGR Class 7100 is a class of Japanese steam locomotive which was first used in Hokkaido, upon the establishment of the government-sponsored Horonai Railway in 1880. The locomotives were imported from the United States.

The locomotives were produced by H. K. Porter, Inc, of Pittsburgh, Pennsylvania. Two were purchased in 1880 (Nos. 368, 369), two more in 1882 (Nos. 487, 488), one in 1884 (No. 643), one in 1885 (No. 672), and two more in 1889 (Nos. 1009, 1010), for a total of eight. Six of the locomotives were named after major historical or literary figures in 1889, at the suggestion of the Japanese Consul of New York City, Takagi Saburō, who found appeal in the similar practice seen in the United States at the time. Thus, the six engines were named Yoshitsune (義經), Benkei (辨慶), Hirafu (比羅夫), Mitsukuni (光圀), Nobuhiro (信廣), and Shizuka (しづか), respectively. The final two engines did not receive names.

== History ==
Service began between Sapporo and Temiya on 28 November 1880, via Yoshitsune and Benkei. The following year, on 30 August 1881, Emperor Meiji rode the line, called Kaitakushi-gō (開拓使号, "Settlement Envoy"). Pulling nine cars in poor weather, the train arrived late, but this was said to be acceptable; it is not clear which locomotive was used. The line was extended in 1882 to connect Sapporo with Horonai, and Hirafu and Mitsukuni were obtained. Nobuhiro and Shizuka were purchased soon afterwards, and in 1887 a Baldwin Locomotive Works 1-C tender engine was also purchased, which was given the class number 7170. When the last of the H.K. Porter locomotives were purchased, the trains' ordinals were rearranged to group the Porters together.

The railway company changed ownership in 1889, the Hironai Railway being sold to the Hokkaidō Colliery and Railway Company. Under this company, the locomotives were rebuilt, their smokestacks, cowcatchers, and other features changed or removed. Ten years later, the seventh train (number 1009) was purchased by the Hokkaidō government railway and repaired; but it barely saw service, and was only used to aid in construction and to plow snow.

The Hokkaidō Colliery and Railway Company, and thus all the Class 7100 locomotives, came under the control of the government in 1906, with the passage of the Railway Nationalization Act, which incorporated it into the Japanese Government Railways. The numbering of train series was standardized and formalized in 1909, officially establishing these eight locomotives as the Class 7100 (7100-7107). The engines' names were dropped, and some changes were made to the vehicles, in particular the one purchased by the government in 1899, which was made to have two separate repeat-transferring boilers. Three vehicles were left entirely unaltered. At this point, No. 7103 was traded away, while the other seven entered service under the Hokkaidō governmental construction bureau.

In 1915, efforts were made by a Hakodate factory to reunite the eight locomotives, but 7103 was experiencing hunting oscillation problems; information regarding its condition, as well as repair reports, cannot be found, and thus its fate remains uncertain today. Beginning in 1917, the eight were scrapped or sold. Japan Steel Works, Ltd. purchased 7106 in that year. The Hokkaidō governmental construction bureau purchased 7100, 7102, and 7107 in 1923, and the Imperial Railway Company, then known as Baihatsu Steel, bought 7104 and 7105 two years later. Baihatsu would later sell 7104 to the Kōchi Railroad Company (now Tosa Electric Railway) which used it for construction and then destroyed it. Locomotive 7101 was initially left intact and shipped to Tokyo, and was placed in storage.

== Construction ==
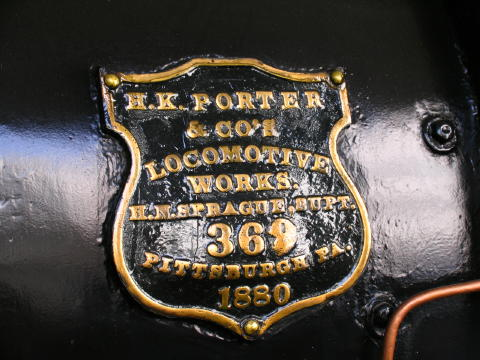
The builder's plate from Benkei (7101)

The locomotives were of the 2-6-0 wheel arrangement, the driving wheels being 914 mm (3 ft) diameter, and used Stephenson valve gear. Their tenders had two two-axled bogies, with the unofficial names written in large kanji (characters). The lettering style is said to emulate the handwriting style of either Settlement Envoy Kuroda Nagamasa or Secretary Sannai Rokusaburō.

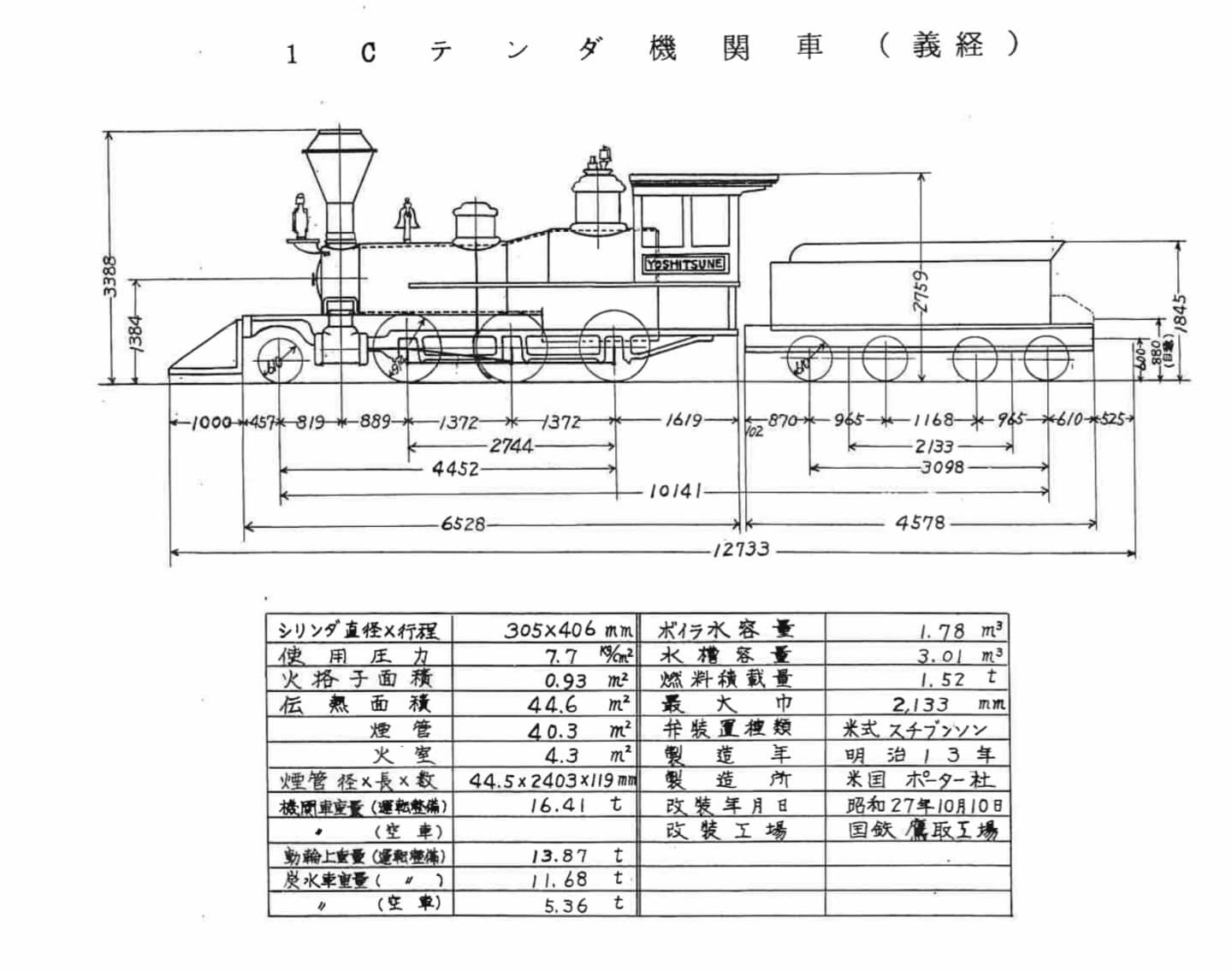
Technical drawing of Japanese 7100 steam locomotive Yoshitsune

The locomotives were outfitted with cow catchers, smokestacks, bell, oil lamp headlights, and a wooden cab, all typical of American locomotive design practice. The two purchased in 1880 used Westinghouse air brakes, which was quite new and advanced at the time; it allowed the brakes to be applied to all cars simultaneously.

== Preservation ==
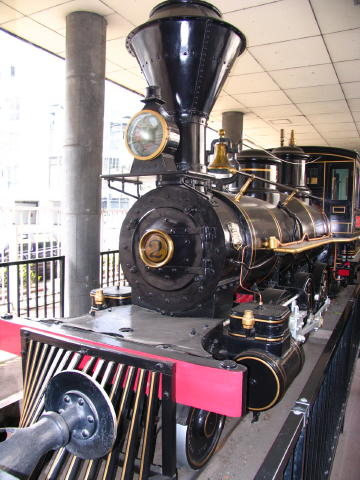
Benkei (7101) at the former Tokyo Transport Museum

A replica of 7101, at the time thought to be Yoshitsune, was included in the original exhibitions of the Railway Museum upon its opening in Tokyo in 1922 (the Railway Museum later became the Transport Museum and closed in 2006). The original no. 7101 was to be sent to the museum from Hokkaidō that following year. However, plans to move the engine were disrupted by the 1923 Great Kantō earthquake which destroyed a great portion of the city; thus the engine was instead placed in a storage shed at Kuroiso station and neglected for over ten years, while the replica was scrapped.

It was decided that Benkei would be conserved in Sapporo. The Sapporo Railways Handicrafts Office then examined the remains of the scrapped engines, and attempted to trace the remnants to the individual engines of the Class 7100, and to the ones purchased from H.K. Porter. Their findings were actually surprising, reassessing the entire history of which model/series numbers and names belonged to which trains, and in what years they were manufactured. It was decided to conserve Shizuka (7106), but the Japan Steel Works Ltd. felt it was unnecessary. Ultimately, a trade was worked out in which the corporation received scrap metal in exchange for returning the locomotive.

After years of storage, no. 7101 was restored in 1936 at the Ōmiya factory (now the JR East Ōmiya General Rolling Stock Center). During the restoration, a pair of railway enthusiasts examined the engines and determined that the 7101 was originally Benkei (Horonai Railway no. 369) rather than Yoshitsune (no. 368), which had become no. 7105. Restoration was completed in 1940, and 7101, now correctly named Benkei, was placed in the Railway Museum. There, it remained on display outside of the museum until 2007, when it was moved to the new Museum of Railway in Saitama Prefecture.

Those engines which had been purchased by the Hokkaidō construction bureau continued to be used for those purposes until 1950, when they were sent to the JNR Naebo factory. 7100 was used in an exhibition for the 70th anniversary of the Hokkaidō railroad, but 7102 was dismantled in 1952. That same year, in honor of the 80th anniversary of certain railroad operations in Japan, it was decided that Yoshitsune, now identified as 7105, would be restored at the factory in Takatori. A number of parts, including the water tank and coal store had to be replaced, and though the whole project was rushed to be completed by 18 October, it was said to have been completed beautifully. The same year, 7106 was handed over ahead of schedule, by the Japan Steel Works, and restoration began using parts from 7100.

Once restoration work on Yoshitsune and Shizuka was completed, the pair were displayed on the Imperial Court platform at Harajuku Station. The pair were then held in national railway factories until 1962, when Shizuka was moved to the Otaru Transport Anniversary Hall in Otaru, Hokkaidō, and both were designated Railway Semi-memorial Objects (準鉄道記念物).

In 1990, Yoshitsune was used once more, as event cars for the International Garden and Greenery Exposition, Osaka. After that, in 1997, it entered the Modern Transportation Museum in Osaka's Minato-ku, and was promoted in 2004 from semi-memorial to full Railway Memorial Object.

On 10 October 2014, for the first time in seventeen years, Yoshitsune was brought back into operation to celebrate the centenary of the Umekoji depot. The locomotive has continued to be operated occasionally.

== See also ==
- Japan Railways locomotive numbering and classification
- List of operational steam locomotives in Japan
