= Horonai Railway =

19th century railway in Japan

The Horonai Railway (官営幌内鉄道, kan'ei Horonai tetsudō) was a Japanese government-managed railway which was among the first to be built in Hokkaidō. Established in 1869, it was sold off to the private sector twenty years later. Some of the infrastructure of the Horonai Railway remains in use today, as the Temiya Line and Muroran Main Line, connecting Minami-Otaru Station and Iwamizawa Station; these began operations in the 1880s.

== History ==
The Hokkaidō Colonization Office was established in 1869, as the new Meiji government sought to take advantage of the natural resources of the island. The American engineer Horace Capron, invited to Hokkaidō by the government for this purpose, determined the presence of a sizable coal deposit in the upper reaches of the Horonai River. Another American engineer, Benjamin Smith Lyman, was invited to plan the establishment and operations of a new coal mine.

Capron suggested the construction of rails from Horonai to the port of Muroran, as part of a plan to ship the coal from there; meanwhile, Lyman's plan involved the construction of rails instead to Horomuibuto (today Ebetsu), and intended to use a system of river boats on the Ishikari River for shipping the coal to Otaru, where they could be transferred to a larger ship. The government decided Lyman's plan was cheaper, and in March 1878, they invited yet another American engineer, to begin land surveys in preparation for construction. Crawford quickly determined that much of the land, being swampy, was not suitable for rails, stations, or other buildings, and that the river would freeze over in winter, rendering this shipping plan feasible for only around 150 days each year. His suggestion to extend the rail lines from Horomui Futoshi to Otaru, and to build rails straight to the piers, was approved by the Settlement Envoy, Kuroda Kiyotaka.

Construction began in January 1880; a test run was done in October from Temiya to Zenibako, and regular operations began at the end of November, running from Temiya to Sapporo. While the first railways in Japan, in the Keihin and Hanshin regions, were designed on English models, this was the first railway in Japan to be designed by Americans. Though the American engineers suggested the use of 914 mm (3 ft) gauge track, as was standard in the United States, Kuroda thought ahead and it was decided that use of the British standard of 1,067 mm (3 ft 6 in) would allow the Hokkaidō system to be compatible with, and perhaps in the future connected to, the Honshū network.

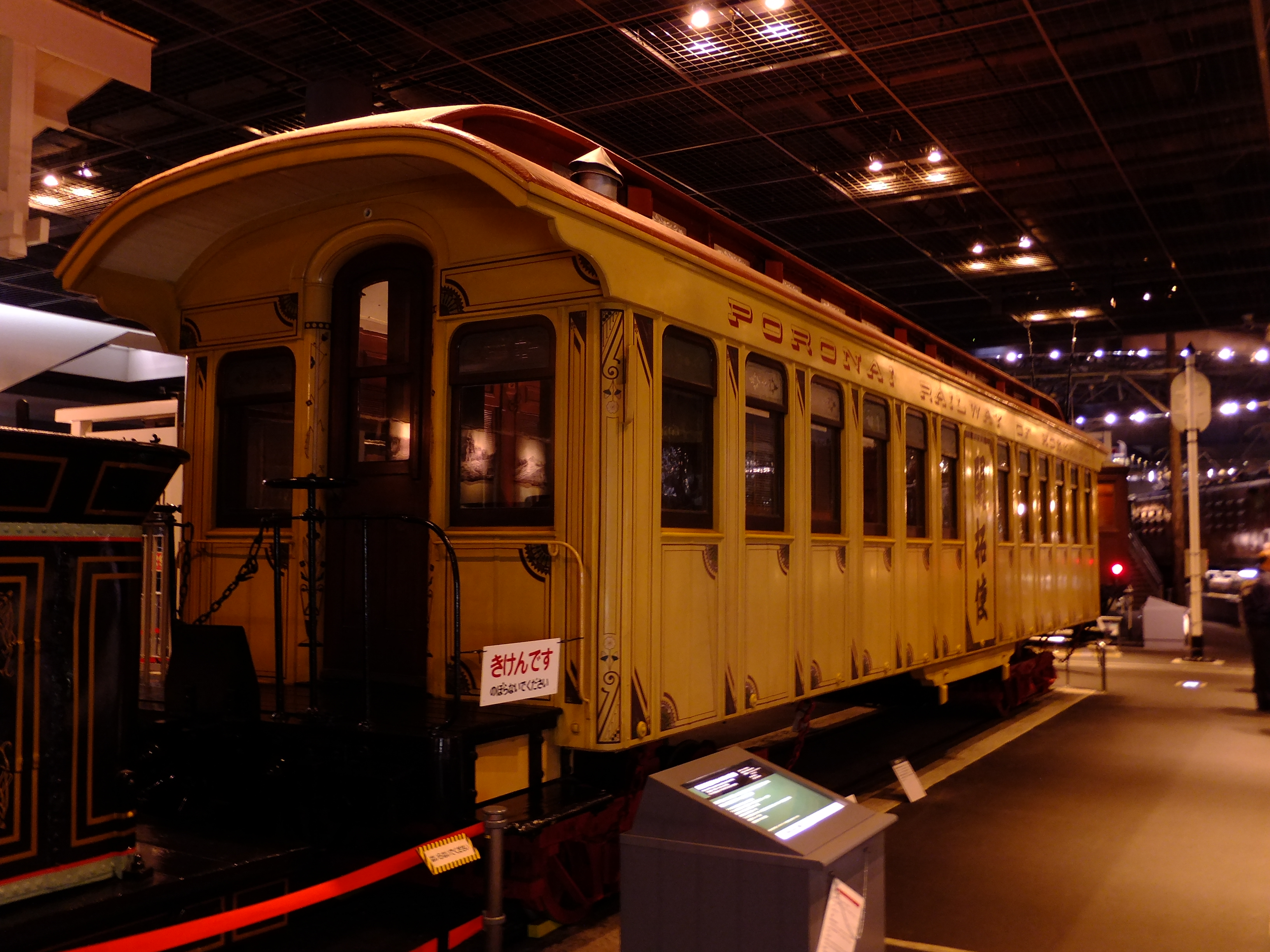
Horonai Railway Kotoku 5010 passenger carriage 'Kaitakushi'

Fifteen kilogram per metre iron rails were used, with a minimum of wood and gravel on the rail bed. Though the Temiya factory and railyard were established by now, the stations in Otaru (now Minami-Otaru Station) and Sapporo were still temporary constructs; Asari, Asakawa, and Kotoni Stations were made "flag stops", in the American style. Two steam locomotives were imported from H. K. Porter, Inc along with eight passenger cars from Harlan and Hollingsworth, both American firms. These locomotives, dubbed Benkei and Yoshitsune, were the first of what would later be termed the 7100 series of locomotives. Each locomotive in the series would be named after a figure from Japanese history. The following year, Emperor Meiji made his way to Hokkaidō on his national tour, rode the line from Otaru to Sapporo, and gave his approval.

In February 1882, the Colonization Office was abolished, and the railway and coal mine came under the jurisdiction of the construction bureau. The Sapporo-Ebetsu route was opened provisionally in June, and by November the line was completely operational from Temiya to Horonai. The official opening ceremonies were held on September 17, 1883, and were attended by members of the royal family, the military, and Inoue Masaru, chief of the Railroad Office. Passenger service was run for free to the local citizens for the entire day.

However, it was soon decided that the railway was not doing well. In the six years from 1880 to 1885, it produced roughly one-third of the anticipated profit for that period. The construction bureau turned over control of the railroad, and the coal mine, to the Hokkaidō Government Office in January 1886. The following year, the two were split into separate offices, and the railroad began to be administered from Temiya instead of Sapporo, but before the end of the year, the Horonai Railway came to be contracted by the head of the Rails & Coal Mine Office, Murata Tsutsumi, to aid in the completion of the Ikunshunbetsu Line. This operation would not be profitable for the Horonai Railway, but Murata took these risks on himself, and explained to the Hokkaidō Government Office that this work was necessary in order to get the Ikushunbetsu coal mine operational, and that initial expenditures were necessary in such a venture. He hoped the expenses could be compensated for somewhat by the rents and taxes paid by the citizenry. Murata's scheme was approved in 1888, and he formed the Hokuyūsha (Northern Property Company) to manage the railroad contracts. For the next fifteen years, the Hokuyūsha paid the Horonai Railroad 5000 yen every year in return for using their trains and rails, and took on the responsibility of maintenance and all other fees; this revived the railroad's revenues.

The route from Horonaibuto (today Mikasa Station) to Ikushunbetsu began operations in 1886, and though coal prices dropped soon afterwards, this contract and the ensuing relationship between the Railroad and Murata's ventures helped recoup all the costs of the initial construction.

== Steam locomotives ==
The Horonai railroad operated eight steam locomotives: six of the 7100 series, and two, called "Murata No. 1" and "Murata No. 2," of the 7170 series.
