= Ironai Station =

Railway station in Hokkaido, Japan

Coordinates: 43°11′48.1″N 140°59′58.9″E

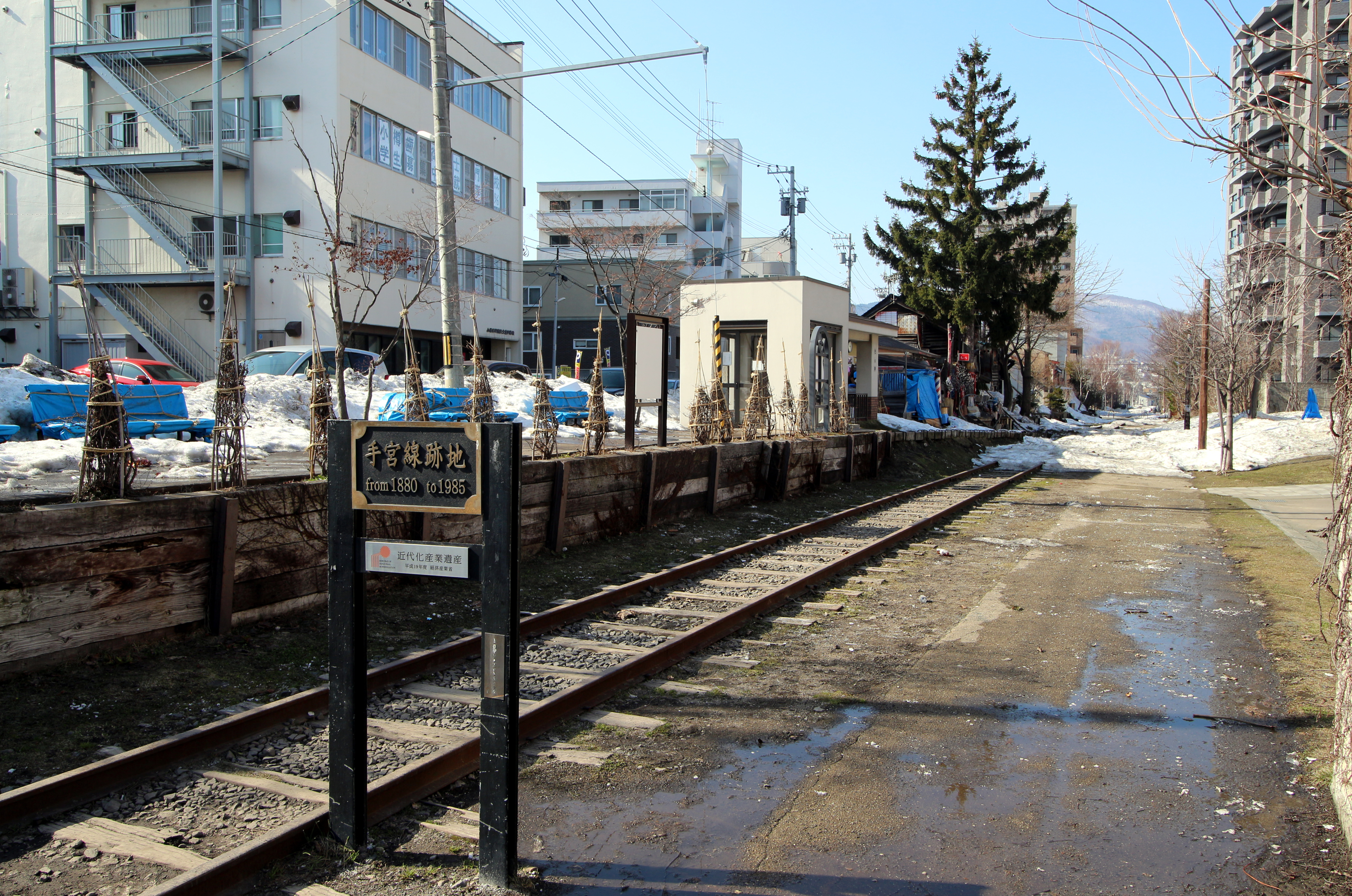
Ironai Station

Ironai Station (色内駅, Ironai Eki) was a railway station on the Japanese National Railways Temiya Line. It was located in Otaru, Hokkaidō, Japan. Though no longer operational, the train platform and tracks still exist and are situated next to what is now a footpath.

== History ==
- 6 Aug, 1912 Open as a temporary station
- 1 Dec, 1914 Operation stopped
- 1 Jun, 1920 Reopen
- 1 May 1943 Changed to a permanent station
- 1 Oct, 1943 Operation stopped
- 10 Nov, 1949 Closed
- 1 Sep, 1949 Open as a temporary station
- 15 May 1962 Closed
