= Shurly & Dietrich =

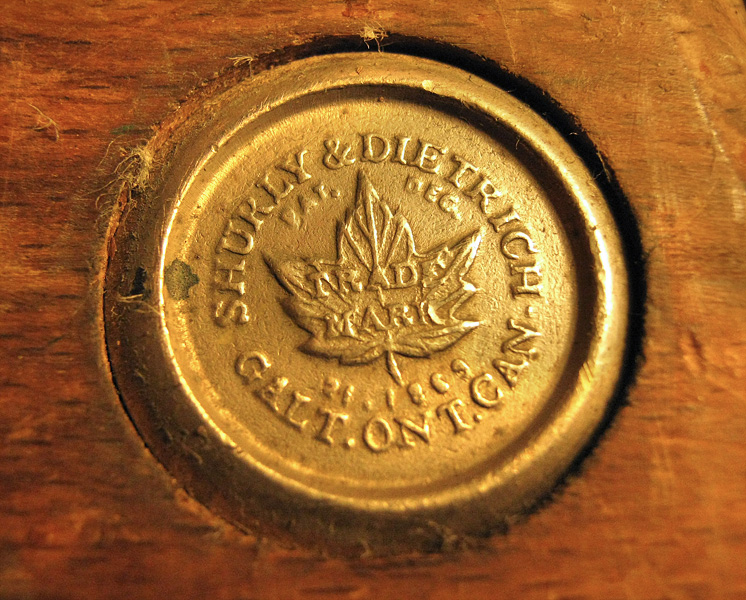
Shurly & Dietrich logo

Shurly & Dietrich Co. was a Canadian saw manufacturer that was founded in 1873 by Cosmos J. Shurly (1835 - 1918) and Jerome C. Dietrich (1838 - 1925). Shurly & Dietrich saws were heavily used in the Canadian logging industry.

== History ==
In 1873, Jerome Dietrich and Cosmos Shurly brought skills learned while working at Disston Saw Works in Philadelphia, Pennsylvania, and invested $12,000 to found the Shurly & Dietrich Co. They hired nine saw makers from Rochester, New York and Sheffield, England and began to manufacture saws in Galt, Ontario, now called Cambridge. By 1886 the company employed 70 skilled workman. The company held a number of Canadian patents for saw design.

By 1906, Cosmos' son Theodore Shurly was the factory superintendent.

Shurly & Dietrich later expanded into Quebec by purchasing an existing saw factory, Beaver Saw Works, in Sherbrooke.

Between 1904 and 1910 the company expanded its original Galt factory, but in 1914 it sustained damage from a fire. By that time they had also built another plant in St. Catharines.

In 1931, Shurly & Dietrich merged with another saw manufacturer, E. C. Atkins of Hamilton, and became Shurly-Dietrich-Atkins.

During World War II, Shurly Dietrich produced about 40,000 tons of light armoured plate, bringing in workers from Newfoundland to supplement the workforce.

In 1957, Shurly Dietrich was one of two main saw manufacturers in Canada. By 1968 about 1,400,000 feet of band saw blades designed for cutting metal and over 1,000,000 jigsaw blades were being manufactured each year.

In 1969, Shurly Dietrich was acquired by H.K. Porter.

In 1973, Shurly Dietrich closed its plant after one hundred years in business.
