= Granite Rock Co. 10 =

Preserved American 0-6-0T locomotive (USATC S-100 class)

Type and origin
- Power type: Steam
- Designer: Howard G. Hill
- Builder: H. K. Porter, Inc
- Serial number: 7461
- Build date: August 1942
Specifications
- Configuration
  - Whyte: 0-6-0T
  - UIC: C nt
- Driver: 4 ft 6 in (1,372 mm)
- Gauge: 1,435 mm (4 ft 8 1/2 in) Standard Gauge
- Minimum curve: 150 ft (45.72 m) radius
- Length: 29 ft 6 in (8.99 m)
- Fuel type: Oil
- Fuel capacity: 2,500 lb (1,130 kilograms) coal, or 300 US gallons (4,500 L; 1,000 imp gal)
- Water cap.: 1,200 US gallons (4,500 L; 1,000 imp gal)
- Firebox
  - Grate area: 19.4 sq ft (1.80 m^{2})
- Boiler pressure: 210 lbf/in^{2} (1.45 MPa)
- Heating surface
  - Firebox: 86 sq ft (8.0 m^{2})
  - Tubes: 790 sq ft (73 m^{2})
  - Total surface: 876 sq ft (81.4 m^{2})
- Superheater: None
- Cylinders: Two, outside
- Cylinder size: 16.5 in × 25 in (420 mm × 640 mm)
- Valve gear: Walschaerts
- Valve type: Piston valves
- Loco brake: Air
- Train brakes: Air
- Couplers: Knuckle
Performance figures
- Tractive effort: 21,630 lbf (96.22 kN)
- Factor of adh.: 4.65
Career
- Operators: United States Transportation Corps; Granite Rock Company; California State Railroad Museum; Sacramento Southern Railroad; Niles Canyon Railway (leased)
- Numbers: USATC 5001; GR Co. 10
- Retired: 1960
- Restored: May 1997
- Current owner: California State Railroad Museum
- Disposition: Operational

Granite Rock Company 10 is a preserved S100 class 0-6-0T "Switcher" type steam locomotive built in August 1942 by the H.K. Porter for the United States Transportation Corps.

== History ==
=== Army service ===
No. 10 was built in Pittsburgh, Pennsylvania, by the H.K. Porter in August 1942, for the United States Transportation Corps (USATC), originally No. 5001, it served in the Army depot in Tracy, California.

=== Industrial service ===
After World War II, in 1947, No. 5001 was sold to the Granite Rock Company of Watsonville, California and given the number 10. The locomotive worked at the company's A.R. Wilson quarry in Aromas, California until 1960, when it was replaced by diesel locomotives and taken out of service.

=== Preservation ===
No. 10 stayed in Granite Rock's yards, until Bruce Woolpert the president and CEO, started a restoration effort in 1988, the work was undertaken at the shops of the California State Railroad Museum and was eventually donated to the museum in 1995. The restoration work included a new boiler built by the Dixon Boilerworks, in Los Angeles. The locomotive was fully restored to operating condition by May 1997, and became the principle motive power of the museum's Sacramento Southern Railroad excursion railroad.

On August 29, 1997, No. 10 was operated by an all-female crew to mark the anniversary of the ratification of the 19th. Amendment.

In 2010, No. 10 was loaned to the Niles Canyon Railway for their steam festival. The following year, No. 10 was taken out of service for extensive boiler repairs, before returning on April 11, 2015. L

In July 2025, No. 10 was returned to service - after not operating since 2019 due to cylinder issues and the valve bushings being reworked.

== Gallery ==
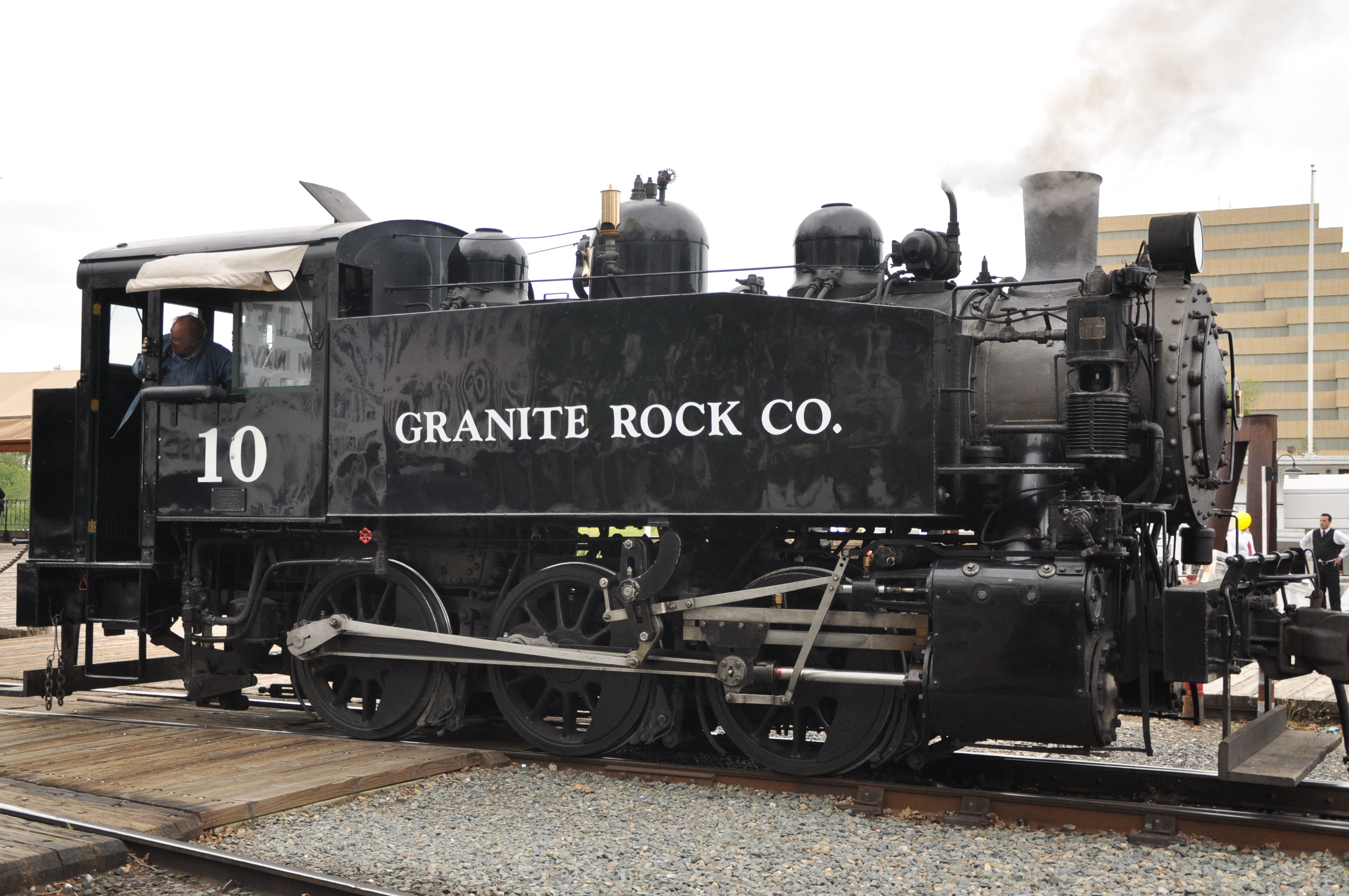

== Sources ==
- Guide to Tourist Railroads and Museums 2001. Kalmbach Publishing Company, Books Division. 2001.
- Hecteman, Kevin W. (2009). Sacramento Southern Railroad. Images of Rail (1st ed.). Arcadia Publishing. p. 114. ISBN 978-0-7385-6986-4.
