= JGR Class 7170 =

Class of 2 Japanese 2-6-0 locomotives

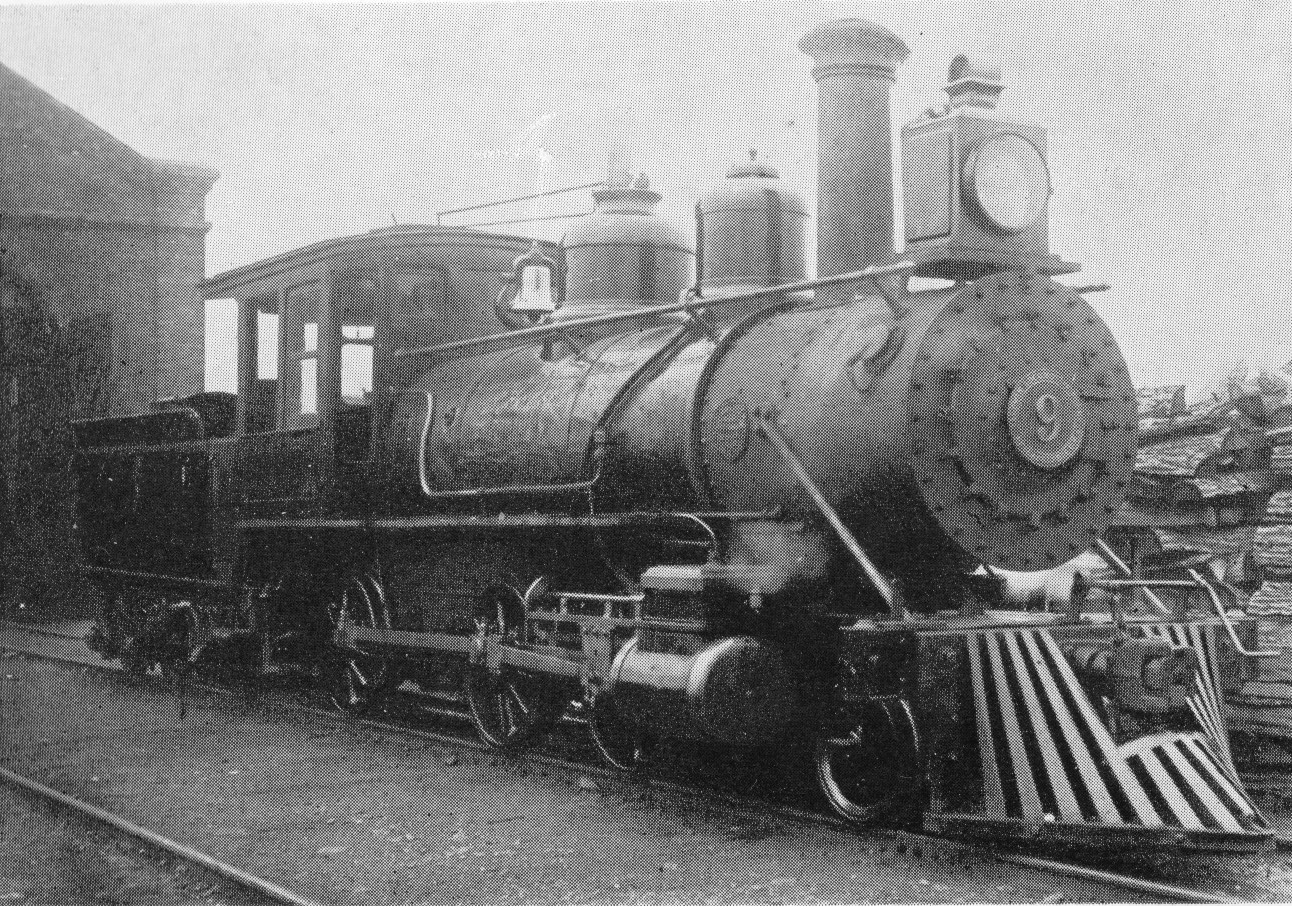
Type and origin
- Power type: Steam
- Builder: Baldwin Locomotive Works
- Build date: 1889
- Total produced: 2
Specifications
- Configuration
  - Whyte: 2-6-0
- Gauge: 1,067 mm (3 ft 6 in)
- Driver dia.: 1,016 mm (3 ft 4.0 in)
- Length: 13.005 m (42 ft 8.0 in)
- Height: 3.696 m (12 ft 1.5 in)
- Adhesive weight: 7.77 t (7.65 long tons; 8.56 short tons)
- Loco weight: 24.33 t (23.95 long tons; 26.82 short tons)
- Tender weight: 15.44 t (15.20 long tons; 17.02 short tons)
- Total weight: 39.77 t (39.14 long tons; 43.84 short tons)
- Fuel type: Coal
- Fuel capacity: 1.88 t (1.85 long tons; 2.07 short tons)
- Water cap.: 4,220 L (930 imp gal; 1,110 US gal)
- Boiler pressure: 7.71 kgf/cm^{2} (756 kPa; 109.7 psi)
- Heating surface: 69.8 m^{2} (751 sq ft)
- Cylinder size: 356 mm × 457 mm (14.0 in × 18.0 in)

The Japanese Class 7170 steam locomotive was among the first trains to be used in Hokkaido, and was utilized alongside the JNR Class 7100 on the Horonai Railway.

The two tender locomotives that were to become the Class 7170 were purchased from the American Baldwin Locomotive Works in 1889, and were included into the numbering sequence of the six 7100 trains as numbers 7 and 8. Soon afterwards, the Horonai Railway came to be controlled by Hokuyūsha company president Murata Tsutsumi, who renamed them "First Murata" and "Second Murata" (dai-ichi and dai-ni Murata). The two were later sold off by the Meiji government, which privatized (sold) a great many government endeavors.

== History ==
Though originally numbered 8 & 9 upon their import from the United States, the two locomotives were re-numbered 9 & 10 upon their sale by the government-controlled Horonai Railway to the Hokkaido Colliery and Railway Company in 1889. The 1906 Railway Nationalization Act then incorporated the Hokkaido Colliery and Railway Company into the Japanese Government Railways. Three years later, legislation would formalize and standardize the numbering, establishing the Class 7170 as consisting of these two locomotives, dubbed 7170 and 7171. At this time, the chimneys were altered, and the forward sections of the steam rooms expanded.

Following the nationalization of the railways, in 1920 the two were sold to the Suttsu Railways, and re-numbered No. 1 and No. 2, serving Kutchan, Muroran, Asahikawa and Hakodate. Though they served their new purpose well, and were used extensively, one of the locomotives suffered an accidental collision on July 2, 1950, and was scrapped the following year.

== Construction ==
The tender locomotives had their maker's standard 2-6-0 (1C) axle positions. Like the 7100 series, they bore a diamond-shaped chimney and cow catcher in the older American style, but had straight-top boilers instead of wagon-top ones, and a steam-dome in the second boiler compartment. The furnace was located between the second and third driving wheels, which were 1,372 mm (54.0 in) apart; the first and second driving wheels were 2,296 mm (90.4 in) apart. Of the tender's three axles, the second and third were bogies.

=== Main specifications ===
- Total length： 13,005 mm (42 ft 8.0 in)
- Total height：3,696 mm (12 ft 1.5 in)
- Axle positions： 2-6-0 (1C)
- Driving wheel diameter： 1,016 mm (40.0 in)
- Gauge: standard Stephenson gauge, American type
- Cylinders： 356 mm × 457 mm (14.0 in × 18.0 in)
- Boiler pressure： 7.71 kgf/cm^{2} (756 kPa; 109.7 psi)
- Fire lattice area： 1.06 m^{2} (11.4 sq ft)
- Total heat area： 69.8 m^{2} (751 sq ft)
  - Steam： 55.7 m^{2} (600 sq ft)
  - Furnace： 14.1 m^{2} (152 sq ft)
- Boiler capacity： 2.3 m^{3} (81 cu ft)
- Smaller pipes： 454.5 mm × 2,489 mm (17.89 in × 97.99 in) (160 count)
- Locomotive operating weight： 24.33 t (23.95 long tons; 26.82 short tons)
- Locomotive weight empty： 22.05 t (21.70 long tons; 24.31 short tons)
- Driving wheel weight (running)： 20.12 t (19.80 long tons; 22.18 short tons)
- Driving wheel axle weight (largest)： 7.77 t (7.65 long tons; 8.56 short tons)
- Tender operating weight：15.44 t (15.20 long tons; 17.02 short tons)
- Tender weight empty： 8.43 t (8.30 long tons; 9.29 short tons)
- Water tank capacity： 4.22 m^{3} (149 cu ft)
- Fuel capacity： 1.88 t (1.85 long tons; 2.07 short tons)

== See also ==
- Japan Railways locomotive numbering and classification

== General References ==
Google books: Steam Locomotives of Japan: Jgr Class 7100, Jnr Class C61, Jgr Class 7170, Jnr Class D60, Jnr Class D51, Jnr Class C60, Jnr Class, Part 52, Author: General Books LLC. 2010

- The content represented here derives directly from the corresponding article on the Japanese Wikipedia.
