= Temiya Line =

Former railway line in Hokkaido, Japan

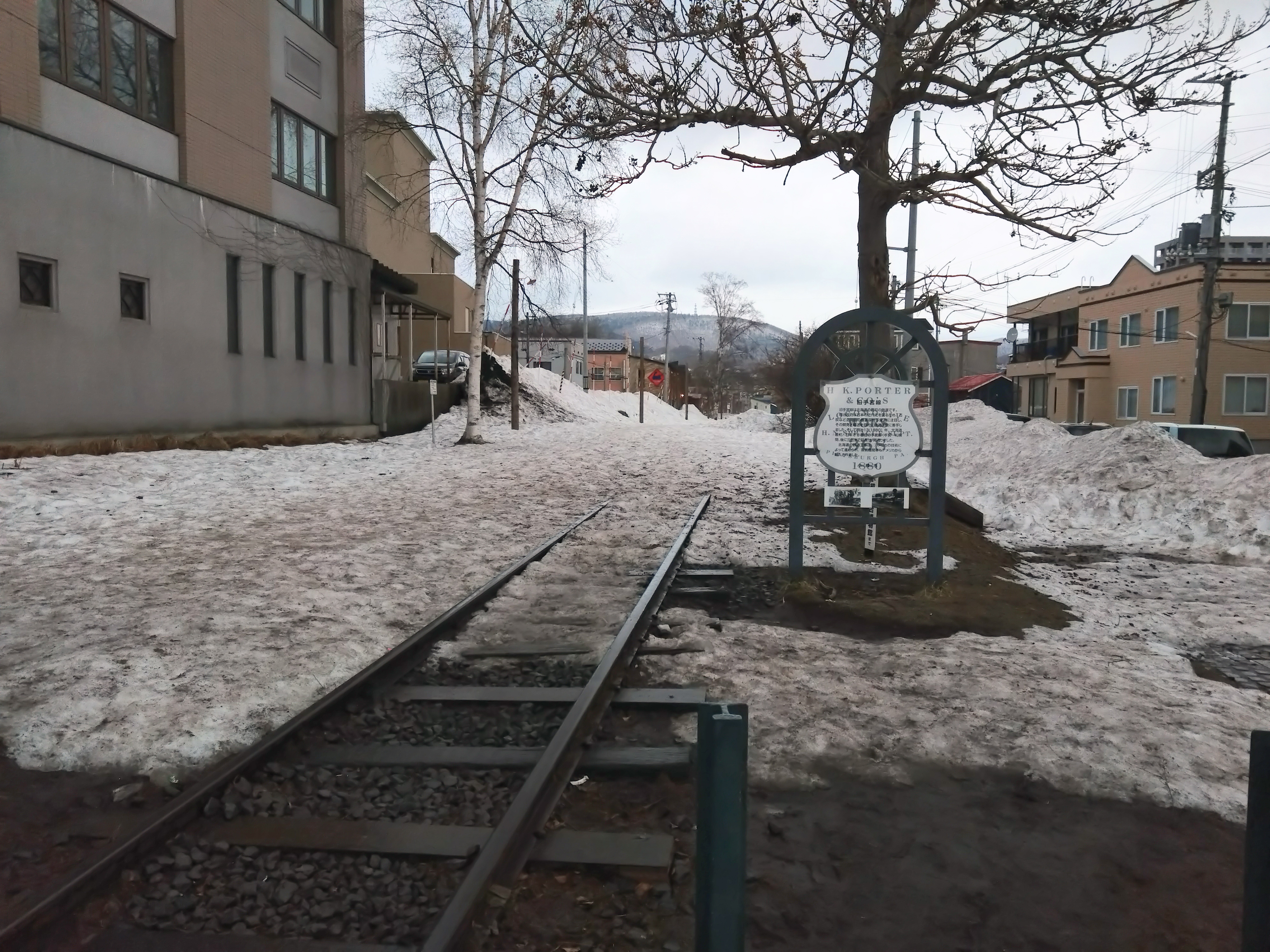
- A route sign in Otaru for the defunct Temiya Line

Overview
- Native name: 手宮線
- Status: Ceased operation
- Owner: JNR
- Locale: Hokkaido
- Termini: Minami-Otaru; Temiya
- Stations: 2

Service
- Type: Commuter rail line
- Operator(s): JNR

History
- Opened: 28 November 1880; 145 years ago
- Closed: 5 November 1985

Technical
- Line length: 2.8 km (1.7 mi)
- Number of tracks: Entirely single-tracked
- Character: Rural and urban
- Track gauge: 1,067 mm (3 ft 6 in)
- Electrification: None

The Temiya Line (手宮線, Temiya-sen) was a local narrow gauge railroad in Otaru, Hokkaidō, Japan, connecting Minami-Otaru Station and Temiya Station. The line was a state-owned enterprise, originally established in the late 19th century to transport coal and marine products, and closed in 1985.

== History ==
The line was originally constructed as a part of the Horonai Railway, the first railway in Hokkaidō, and began operations in 1880. Like many other Meiji period railroad enterprises, the line uses 3 ft 6 in (1,067 mm) gauge track over its 2.8 km route, in order to lower the cost of the original project. Though it was originally intended to extend from the seashore to the colliery at Temari-mura Kayanuma, this was deemed inefficient, as ships could do the same work. The Horonai Railway was sold to the Hokkaidō Colliery and Railway Company in 1889, and by 1906 the Temiya Line had come under government control, officially inaugurated under that name three years later. It carried both freight and passengers for nearly a century. Elements of service in the area, on the Temiya Line and other related lines, were discontinued in 1962, and the line formally closed in 1985.

Today, parts of the line still remain, along with signage in some places. The local Otaru Memorial Museum is caretaker of the remains.
