= Takagi Saburō =

Japanese diplomat and businessman

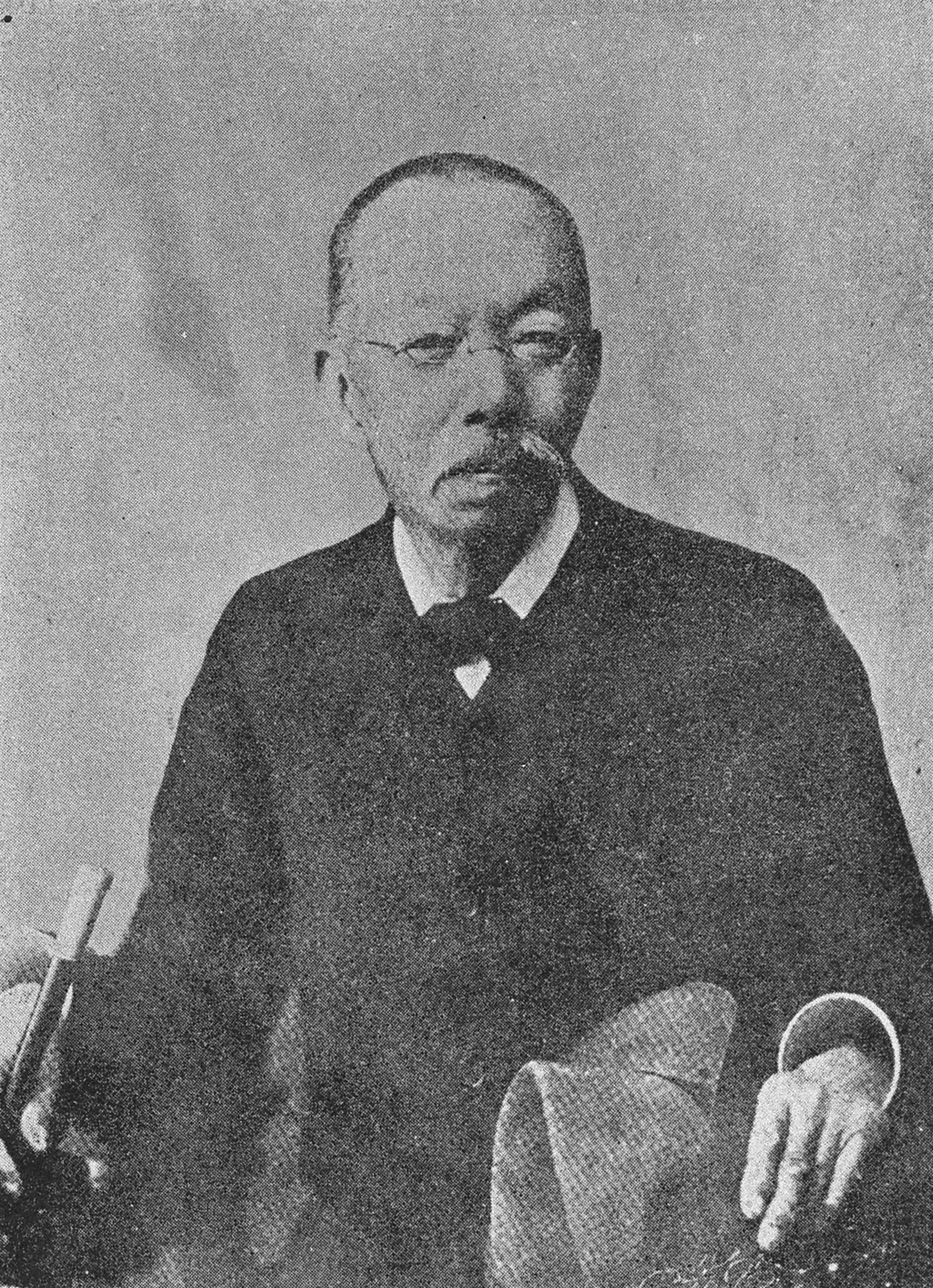
Takagi Saburō

Takagi Saburō (高木 三郎, 9 March 1841 – 28 March 1909) was a Japanese diplomat and businessman of the Meiji period, and the first Japanese Consul General to New York.

== Early life ==
The son of a samurai from Shōnai Domain, Takagi entered naval training school in 1859, and after that studied abroad in the United States.

== Diplomatic career ==
Following his studies, Takagi remained in the United States, and served as diplomatic secretary beginning in 1871. He resigned from the Ministry of Foreign Affairs, however, in 1880.

== Business career ==
Returning to Japan, he became director of a silk company in Yokohama. His company was famous for its efforts to improve sericulture methods and techniques of the spinning industry.
