= Otaru City General Museum =

Museum in Hokkaido, Japan

Coordinates: 43.2113°N 141.0014°E

- 小樽市総合博物館
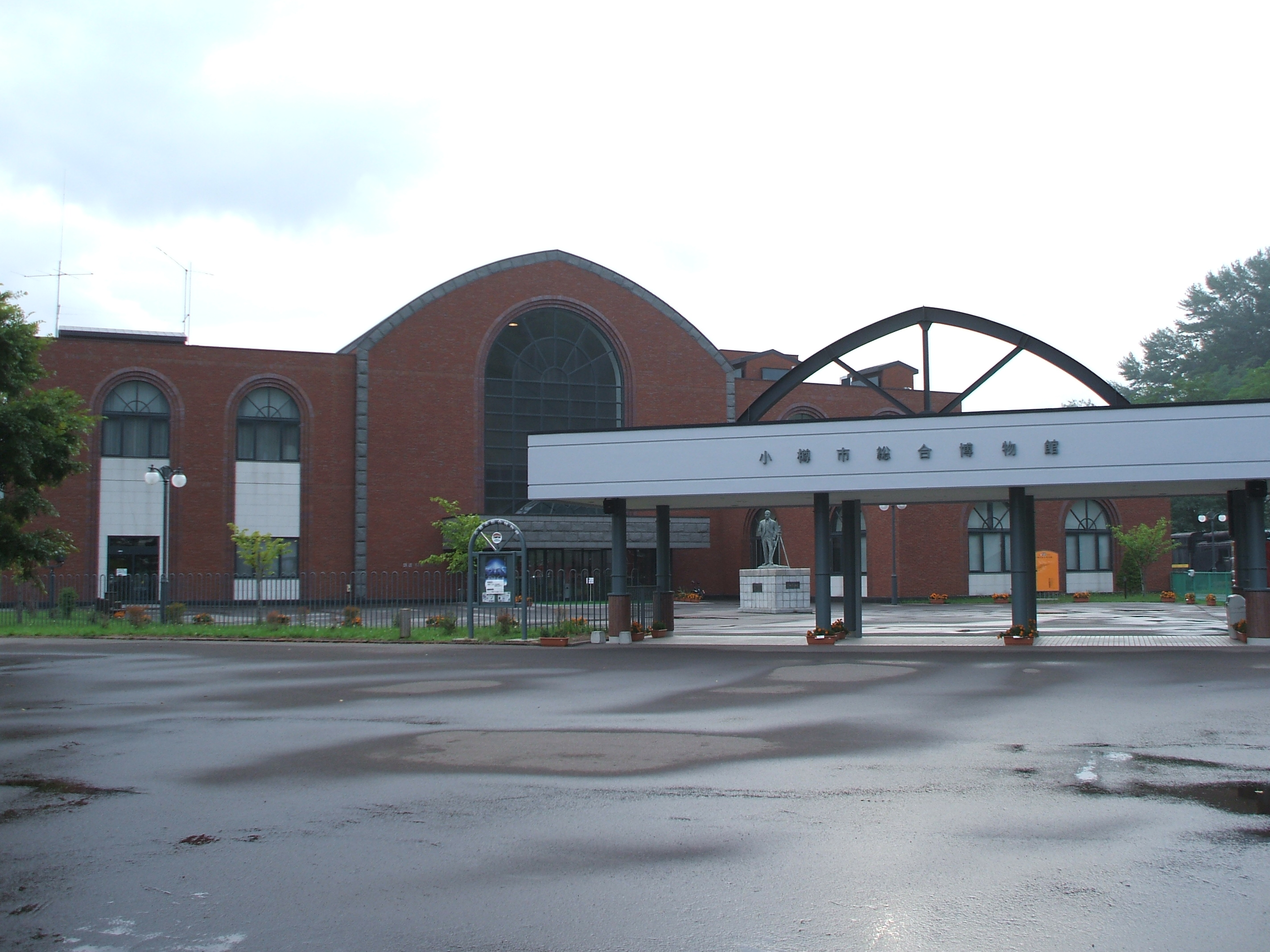
- Main entrance to the museum
- Established: 2007
- Location: Otaru
- Website: www.city.otaru.lg.jp/docs/2020111300736/

The Otaru City General Museum (小樽市総合博物館) is a museum located in Temiya 1-chome, Otaru, Hokkaido, Japan, which features exhibits related to the history and nature of Hokkaido, transportation in the area (including railways), and science.

== Overview ==
On July 14, 2007 (Heisei 19), the functions of the Otaru City Museum (‘’Otaru Hakubutsukan’’) and the Otaru City Youth Science and Technology Museum (closed in December 2006) were integrated into the third sector at Temiya Station. The museum was established by utilizing the facilities of the Otaru Transportation Memorial Museum (closed in March 2006), and the administrative functions were consolidated into the facilities of the former Otaru Transportation Memorial Hall, making it the main building. The former Otaru City Museum was renamed Canal Museum.

=== Main building ===
The Otaru City General Museum is a museum established in 1956 (Showa 31) using the former Nippon Yusen Otaru branch in Ironai. Originally established as the Otaru City Museum, it was a museum that focused on the humanities, art and nature; it then moved to the former Otaru Warehouse, (which is now the Canal Museum), in 1985.

In December 1962, in commemoration of the 85th anniversary of the opening of railways in Japan, the Hokkaido Railway Memorial Museum, which was established by the Sapporo Railway Administration of Japan National Railways at that time, was operated and managed as an annex. When the museum first opened, the former locomotive storehouse was used as the main building, and in October 1964, the Taisho-go locomotive was brought in from the Hokkaido University Museum. The Railway Memorial Hall was temporarily closed in November 1992 (Heisei 4), and after renovation with the City of Otaru as the main financial backer, the exhibition range was expanded to include marine and land transportation on April 20, 1996 (Heisei 8). The space was expanded and re-opened as a comprehensive transportation museum, renamed the Otaru Transportation Museum. It was operated by the third sector ‘’Otaru Kotsu Kinenkan Co., Ltd.’’, but was closed in March 2006 due to a decrease in visitors.

The Otaru City Museum opened on July 14, 2007 (Heisei 19) after relocating to the site of the former Otaru Transportation Memorial Hall and was renamed the Otaru City General Museum, with the functional integration with the Otaru City Youth Science and Technology Museum. In September of the same year, in addition to being the starting point of the Tour de Hokkaido 2007, the ‘’Otaru Classic Car Expo’’ has been held yearly at the museum since that date.

The facility is located on the 5.8 hectare site of Temiya Station on the former Temiya Line, which is the birthplace of railways in Hokkaido. In addition to the three indoor facilities, there is an outdoor exhibition hall where valuable railway vehicles and automobiles are preserved and exhibited. The museum owns 8 out of 12 quasi-railway monuments in Hokkaido, including the Railway Vehicle Preservation Museum, which is the oldest existing locomotive depot and railway monument in Japan.

=== Main exhibits ===
- Former Temiya Agency Warehouse
- Former Temiya Engine Warehouse (Railway Vehicle Preservation Center): Railway Monument, National Important Cultural Property
- Temiyaguchi Turntable: Former Otaru Chikko Locomotive Depot Turntable
- Hokkaido railroad starting point: Zero milepost of the railway

=== Live displays ===
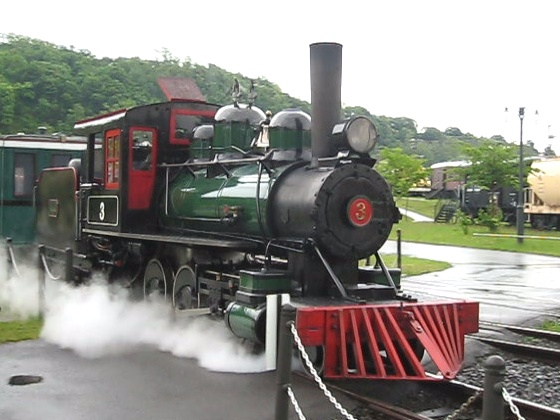
View of the Iron Horse in action.

“Iron Horse”: A 2-6-0 tender steam locomotive made by H.K. Porter, Inc. Purchased from an American theme park in 1993. The locomotive was built in 1909; the locomotive's 100th anniversary was celebrated in August 2009 (Heisei 21). In October 2017, water leakage into the firebox was confirmed, and operation was suspended. Repairs to the locomotive would require it to be transported off-site, and at a cost of around 10 million yen. In April 2018, the locomotive was taken to the Sappa Boiler Works in Osaka Prefecture and repaired. Repairs cost 14 million yen, with 6 million coming from crowdfunding, the rest through a government grant. The locomotive returned to the museum on July 15 and resumed normal service on the 23rd of that same month.

== Canal museum ==
The three buildings of the former Otaru Warehouse (an Otaru City Designated Historic Building), constructed from 1890 to 1894 near the Otaru Canal , are used as facilities to display and introduce the history and natural environment of Otaru City. In the first exhibition room, a display called "History of Otaru - Learn about the history of the town", presents the history of Otaru from the Ainu period to modern times, and in the second exhibition room, a display called "Otaru's nature - Learn about its diverse forms", shows the animals and plants that inhabit Otaru.
