= H.K. Porter, Inc. =

American industrial equipment manufacturer

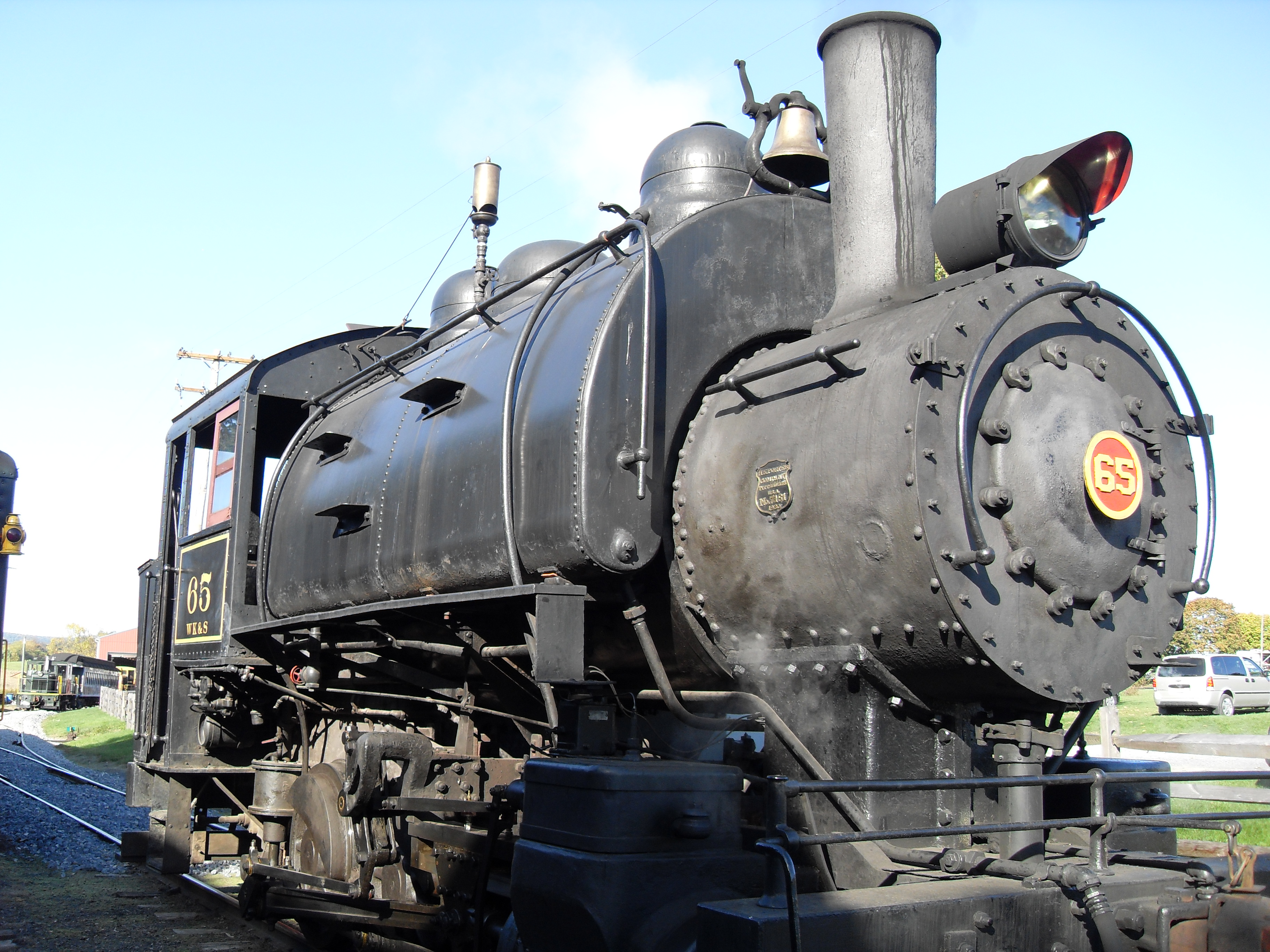
0-6-0ST H.K. Porter locomotive from 1930 at the WK&S

H.K. Porter, Inc. was an American manufacturer based in Pittsburgh, Pennsylvania, best known for building small and specialized locomotives for industrial and narrow-gauge railways. The business was founded in 1866 by Henry Kirke Porter and John Y. Smith as Smith & Porter. After several changes in partnership, Porter continued the business as H.K. Porter & Co., which was incorporated as H.K. Porter Co., Inc. in 1899.

Porter developed a reputation for rugged locomotives that could be quickly adapted to customers' requirements using standardized, interchangeable components. Besides conventional steam locomotives, it built compressed-air locomotives for mines, gasoline-powered locomotives and fireless locomotives; by 1900 it held most of the market for compressed-air locomotives and later became prominent in the fireless-locomotive market. Production peaked in 1906 at almost 400 locomotives for the year.

After a prolonged decline, the company went bankrupt in 1939 and was purchased by Thomas Mellon Evans. Locomotive production revived during World War II, but declining demand for steam power led Porter to become primarily a holding company for a range of industrial businesses. It built its final locomotive in 1950 and sold its locomotive parts business and patterns to Davenport Locomotive Works. Its later operations included electrical equipment, metals, refractories, steel and fabricated products, as well as the manufacture of rocket-motor bodies for the Nike missile programme.

== History ==
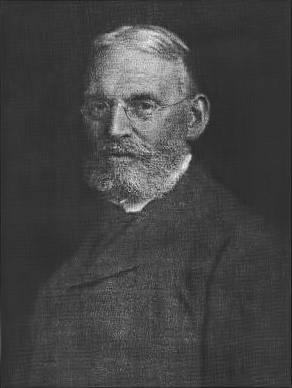
Henry Kirke Porter

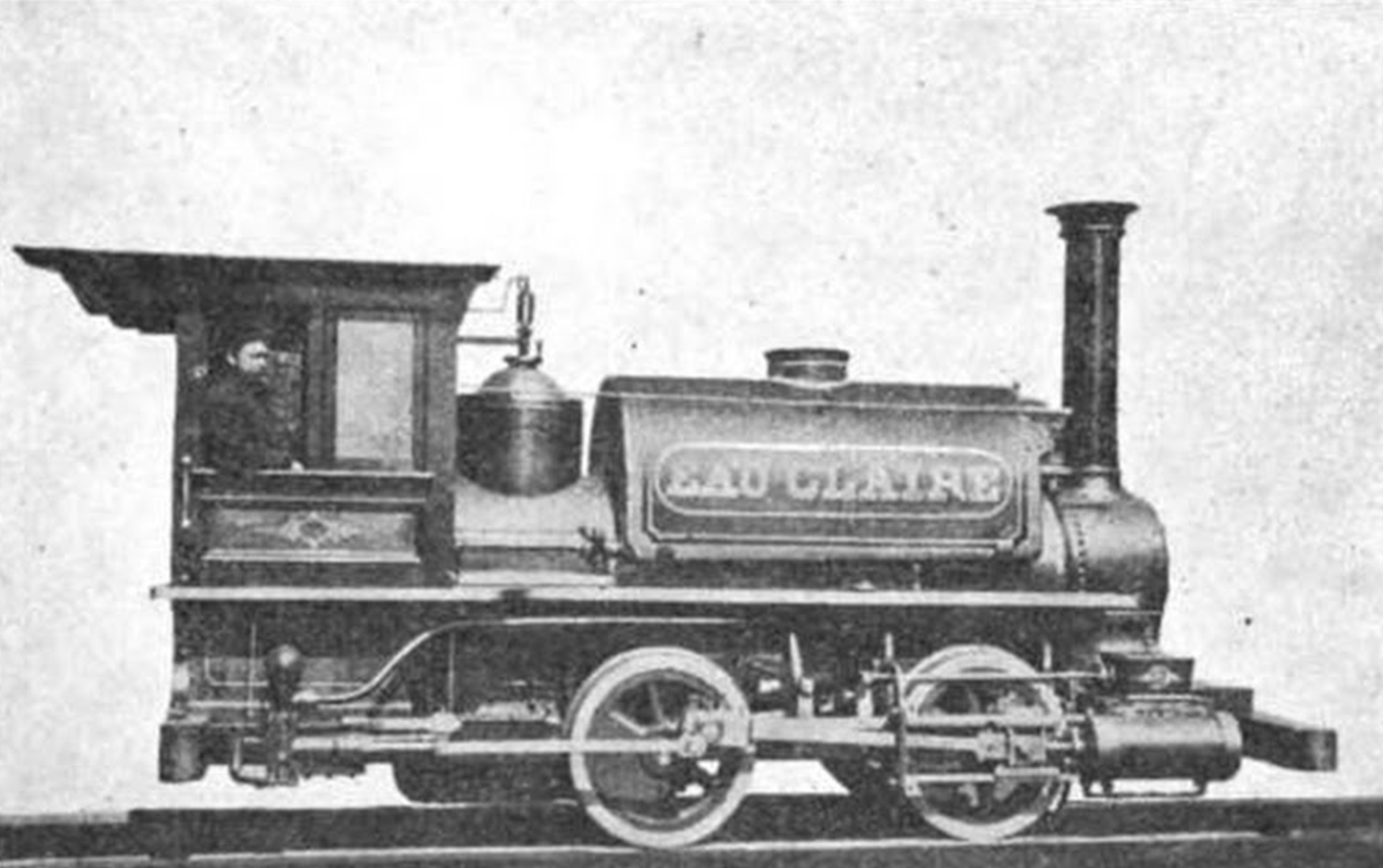
H.K. Porter locomotive Eau Claire built in 1868

In 1866 Henry Kirke Porter formed a partnership with John Y. Smith, forming the company Smith & Porter. They opened a small machine shop on 28th Street in Pittsburgh, Pennsylvania, and begin repairing and building industrial equipment. They received an order for their first locomotive on March 4, 1867, and built the Joshua Rhodes for the New Castle Railroad and Mining Company. They went on to build 43 locomotives together, including the Minnetonka which is preserved at the Lake Superior Museum of Transportation. They specialized in four wheeled, saddle tank locomotives for small industrial railroads.

On February 7, 1871 a fire broke out in the shop destroying twelve locomotives under construction, the shop, and 23 adjacent structures. The losses were estimated at $200,000, and the partnership was dissolved. Smith formed Smith & Dawson Locomotives, which became National Locomotive Works. Porter formed a partnership with Arthur W. Bell, called Porter, Bell & Co. and they built their first locomotive for the Jackson Furnace Co. of Michigan. They expanded their range to include light passenger engines and small freight engines, primarily for narrow gauge railroads. They built 223 locomotives, until Arthur Bell died in May 1878.

Porter continued the business on his own, as H.K. Porter & Co. He had established a reputation as a builder of rugged, specialized locomotives and the company could custom build a locomotive quickly and efficiently, with a system of interchangeable parts; pistons, wheels and boilers in various sizes that can be combined to suit a customer's requirements. Some of the basic designs were kept in stock, and could be ordered off the shelf.

In 1890, Porter built their first compressed-air locomotive, for a coal mine in Pennsylvania. Air was stored in two tanks, and used to drive the pistons instead of steam. Coal-fired locomotives were unsuitable for use underground because they produced dangerous fumes and could start fires. Porter went on to build over 400 compressed-air locomotives. Although other manufacturers built compressed-air locomotives, by 1900 Porter had captured 90% of the market.

In 1899, the company was incorporated as H.K. Porter Co., Inc and built a new plant at 49th and Harrison Street in Pittsburgh. Production peaked in 1906, with almost 400 locomotives built that year.

Porter built their first gasoline-powered locomotive in 1906, and in 1915 they built their first fireless locomotive, using a large pressure vessel to hold steam and hot water in place of a boiler. These proved to be more useful than compressed-air locomotives, and soon Porter dominated this niche market.

1919: Porter was selected to build twenty 4-6-0 45-class mainline locomotives for the Manila Railroad Company in the Philippines to replace its aging British tank locomotives. The class weighed 72 long tons (73 t) and were one of the largest locomotives built by the company. Its efficiency and low cost of maintenance led the Manila Railroad to use the Porter design for larger locomotives built by Alco and Baldwin.

1921: The H.K. Porter Co. was prosperous, enjoying a post-World War I reconstruction boom in Europe, and a road construction boom in the US. Porters were a favorite choice among grading contractors, who used light, portable tracks to carry the wooden tipper-cars that were the earthmoving equipment of the day. Henry Porter, still running the company at age 81, died on April 10.

1939: After a long decline, the H.K. Porter Co. declared bankruptcy. Thomas Mellon Evans purchased the company, determined to turn it around. He bought other manufacturing companies, adding them to his collection. Locomotive production increased again during World War II, and the company was recognized for its service to the country in 1942, but demand for steam locomotives dwindled post-war, and H.K. Porter became primarily a holding company for the many subsidiaries Evans had acquired.

1950: The company built its last locomotive, which was exported to Brazil. The parts business and all the required patterns were sold to the Davenport Locomotive Works in Iowa.

1950s–1960s: Electrical Division National Electric Defense Products Facilities manufactured rocket motor bodies for Nike family of guided missiles.

1969: The company acquired saw manufacturer Shurly & Dietrich, which continued operations until 1973.

== Divisions ==
The company had the following industrial divisions and subsidiaries:

Rubber and Friction Products

- Thermoid Division

Electrical Equipment

- Delta Star Electric Division
- National Electric Division

Copper and Alloys

- Riverside Alloy Metal Division

Refractories

- Refractories Division

Electric Furnace Steel

- Connors Steel Division
- Vulcan-Kidd Steel Division

Fabricated Products

- Disston Division
- Forge and Fittings Division
- Leschen Wire Rope Division
- Mouldings Division

H.K. Porter Company Ltd. was a wholly owned Canadian subsidiary which had the following divisions:

- Refractories Division
- Disston Tools Division
- Federal Wires and Cables Division
- Nepcoduct Systems Division

== Kalmbach collection ==
The largest collection of Porter photographs and information is currently housed in the Kentlein Porter Collection at the A. C. Kalmbach Memorial Library (a service of the National Model Railroad Association) in Chattanooga, TN. Many of the 780 builder's photos, blueprints and other locomotive data were republished in Porter Steam Locomotives, published by the library.

== Gallery ==
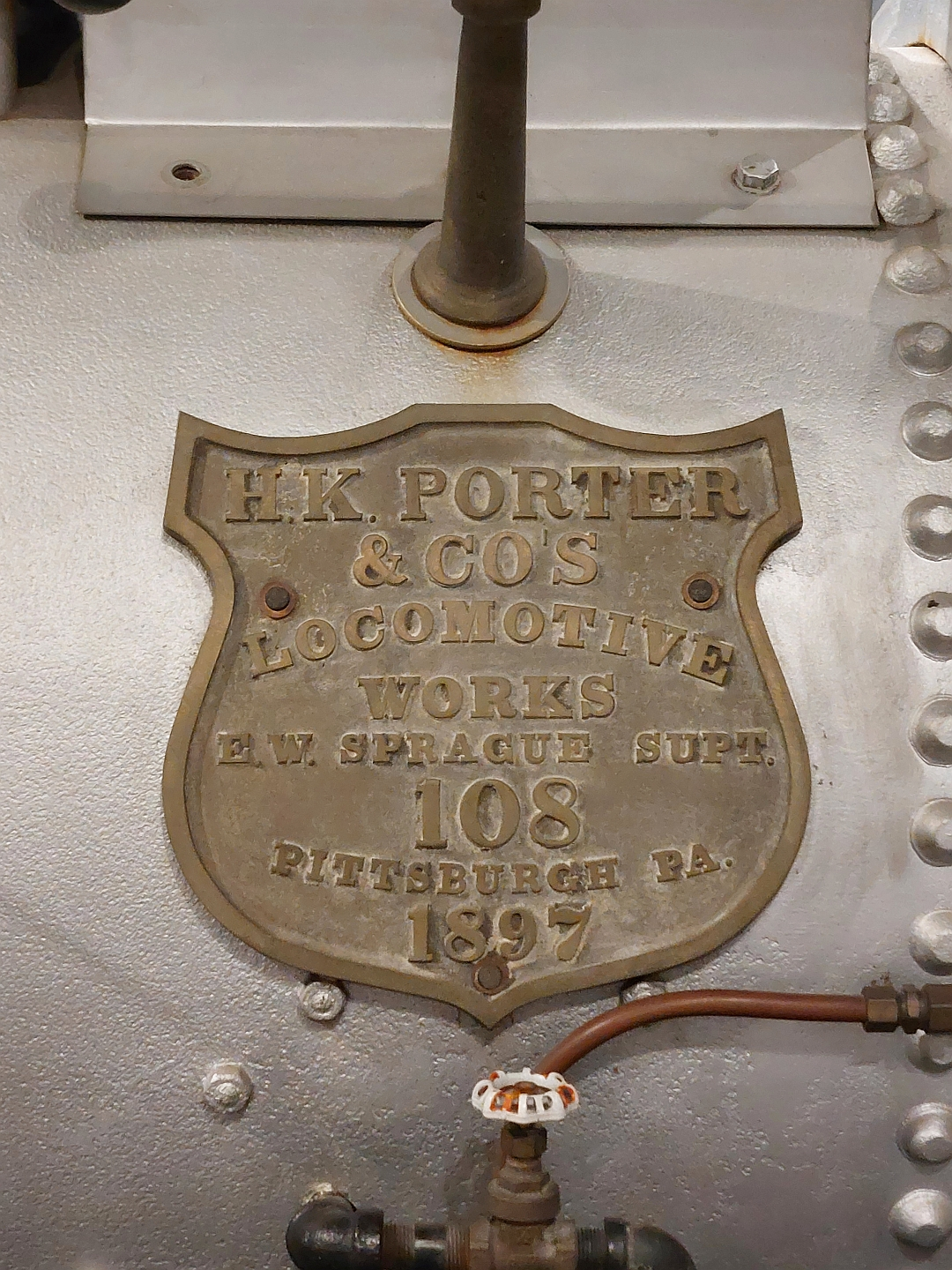
H. K. Porter Company builder's plate, 1897

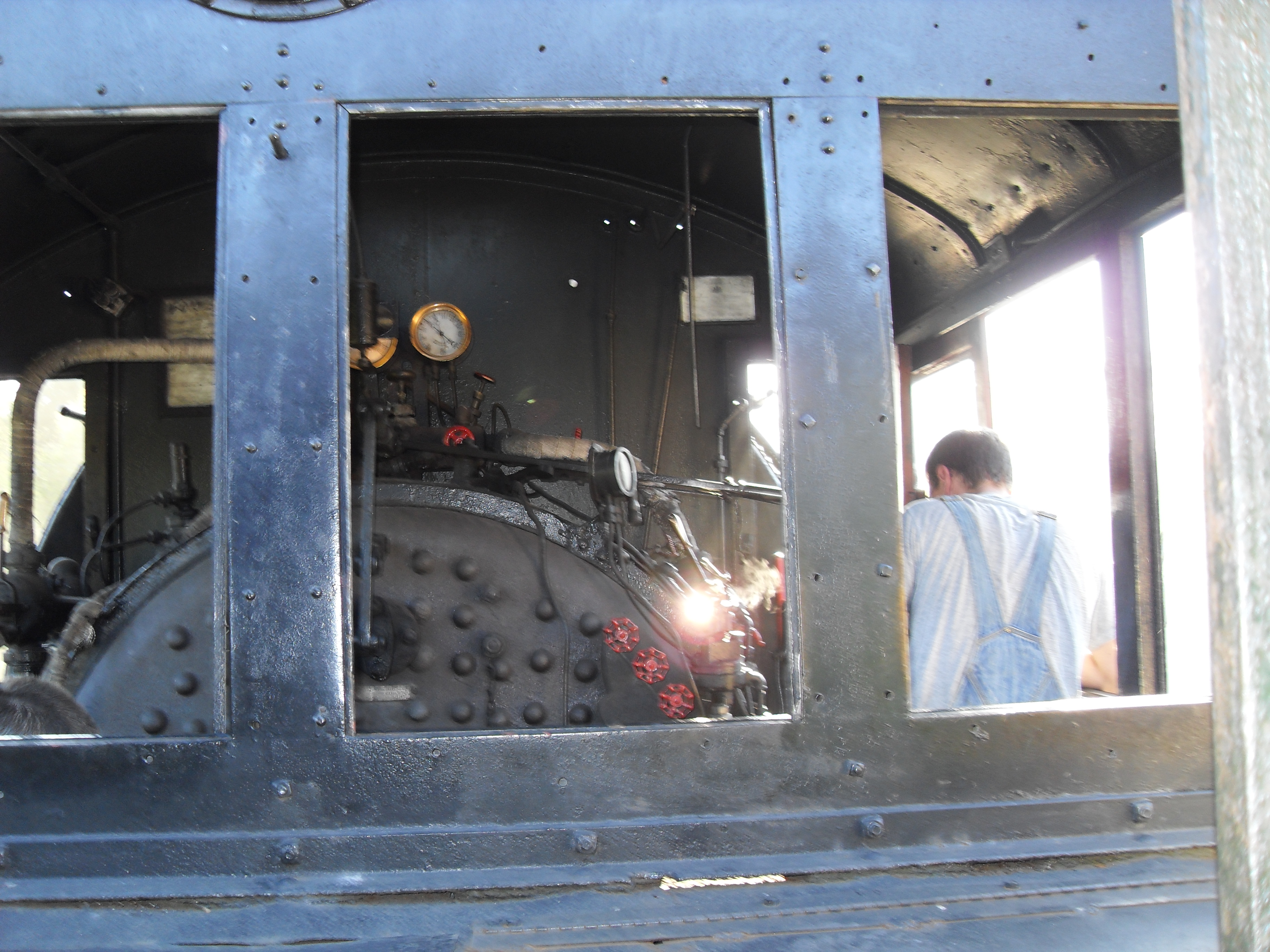
Above 0-6-0 #65, inside view

Porter Locomotive of 1874

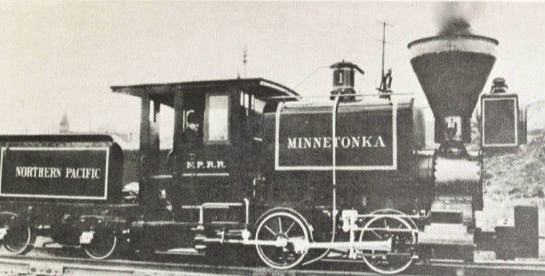
The Minnetonka.

Porter used by grading contractor

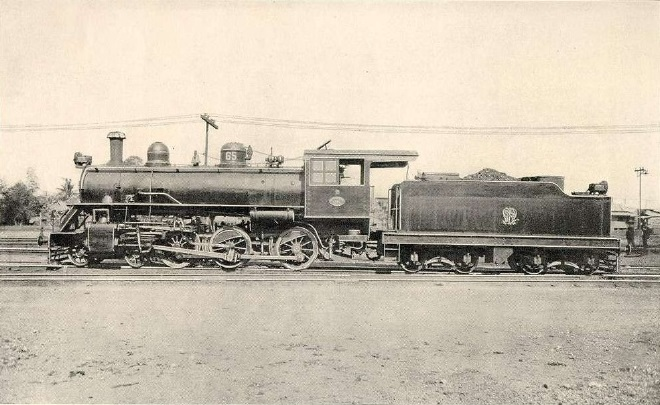
Manila Railroad Porter 65, built in 1921.

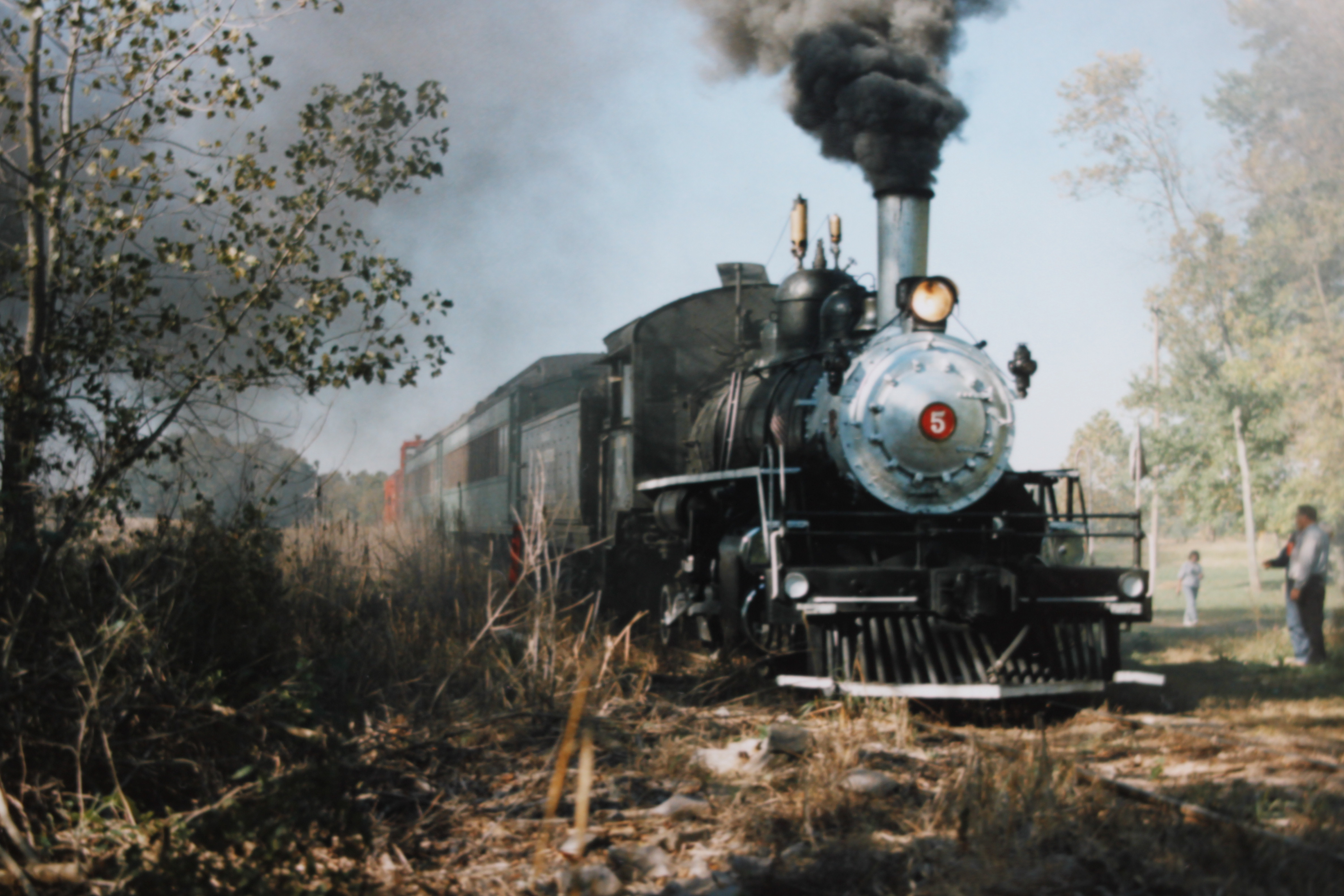
St. Louis, Iron Mountain and Southern Railway 5, a 2-4-2 "Columbian" type, was built by H.K. Porter, formerly as a tank engine.

Preserved narrow gauge Porter locomotive running in 2005

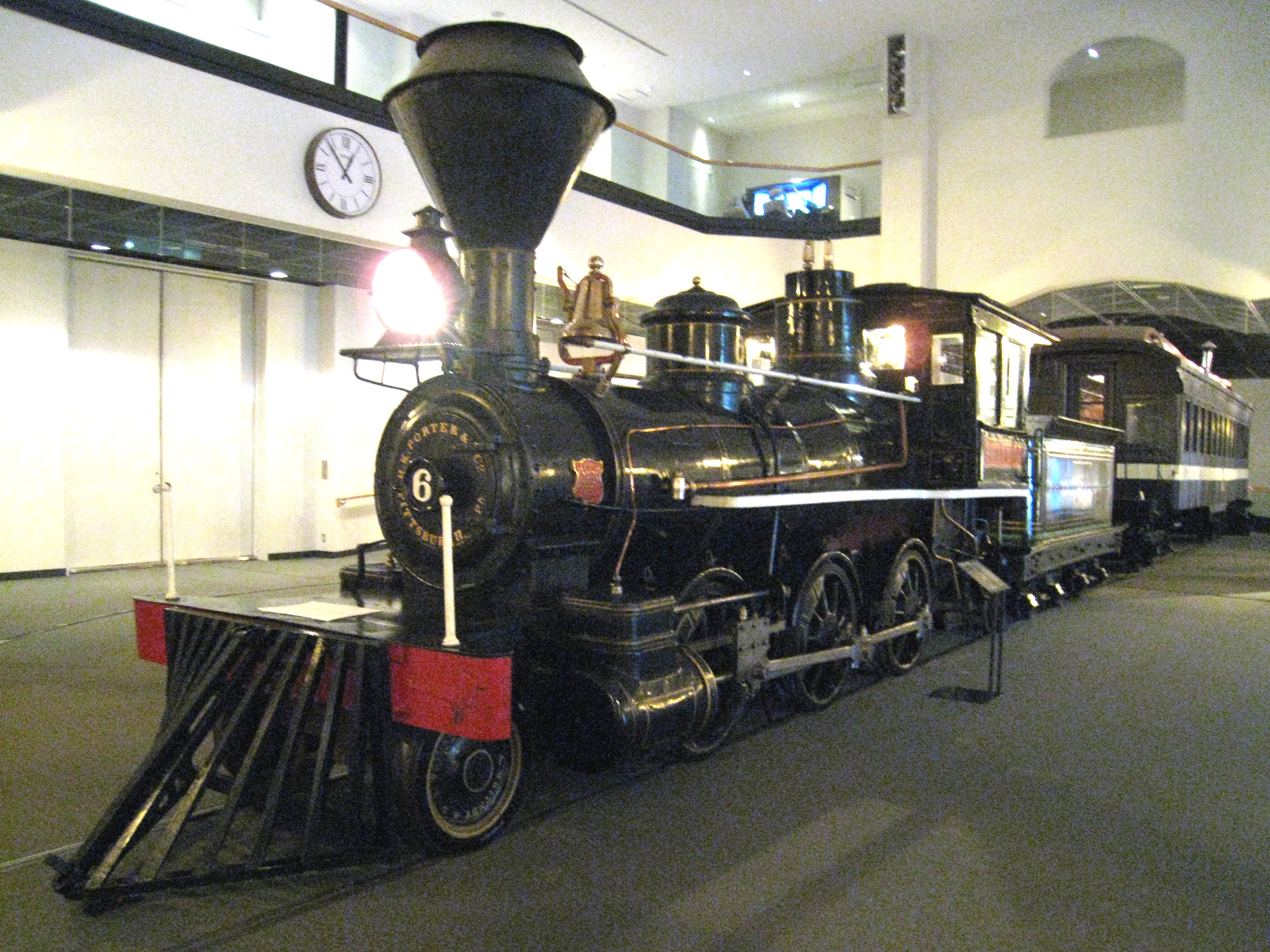
No.672 of 1884, exhibited in Otaru Museum

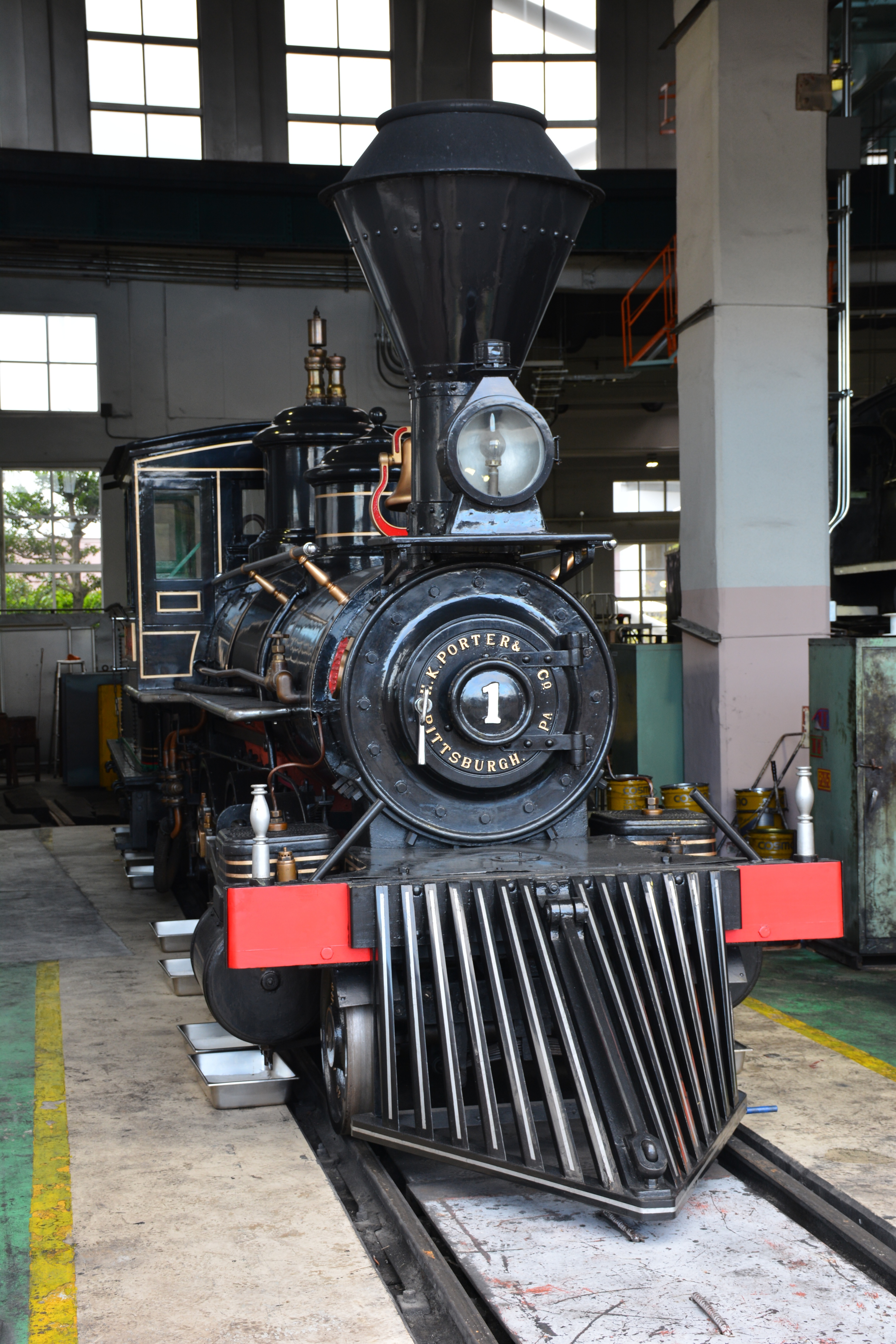
7100 series steam locomotive at Kyoto Railway Museum

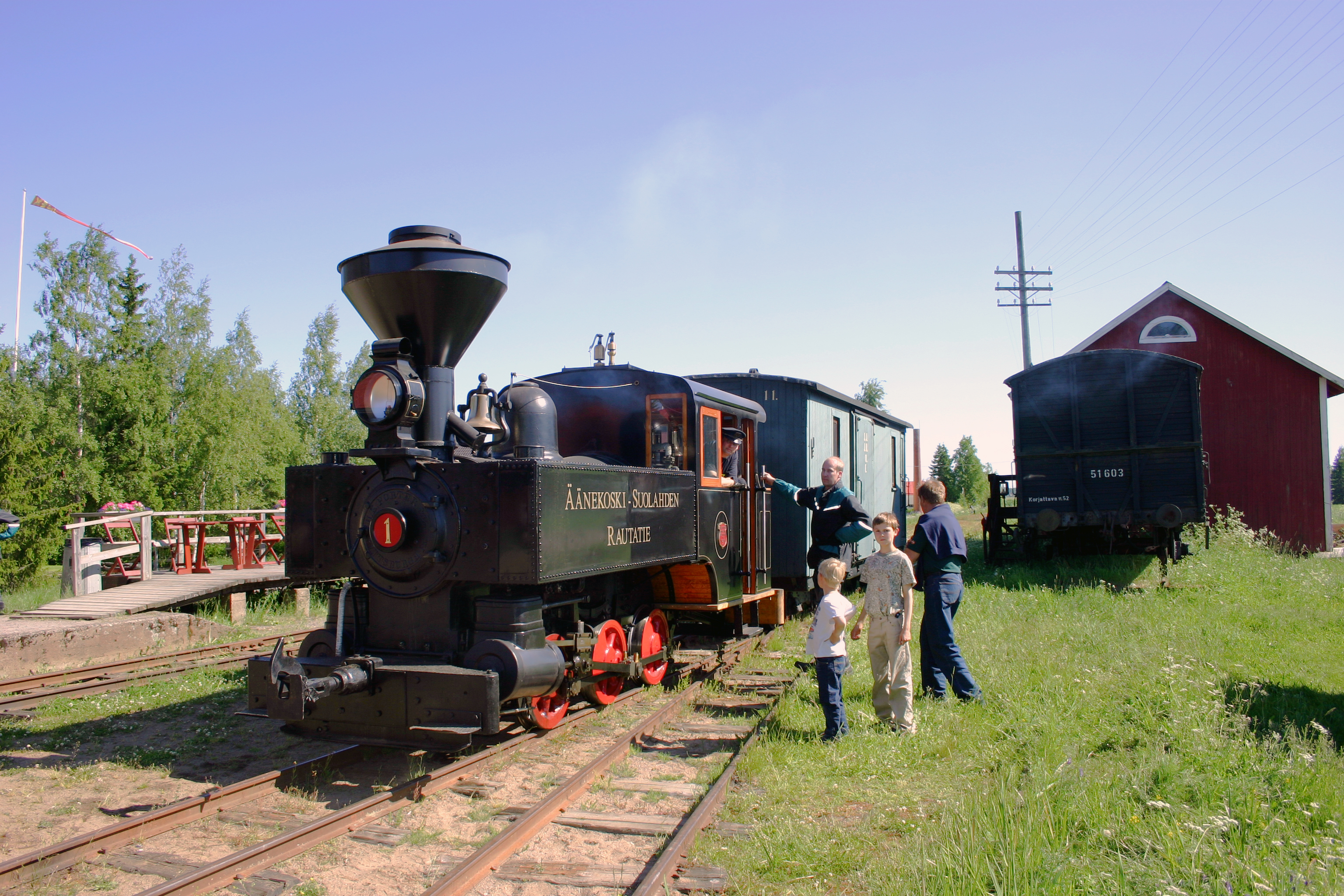
Narrow gauge 750 mm (2 ft 5 1/2 in) Porter. Oldest operational locomotive in Finland (built 1901). Today used in Jokioinen Museum Railway.

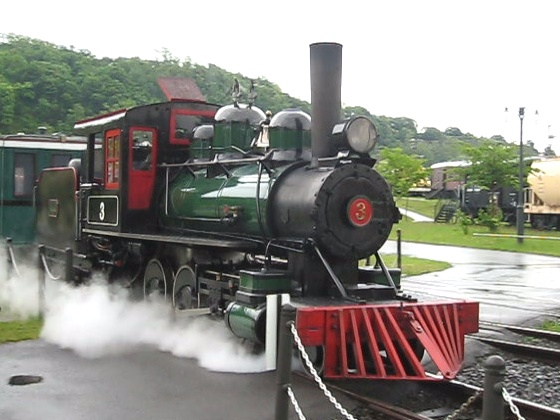
No.4514 of 1909, used in Otaru Museum.

No.4514. (video)

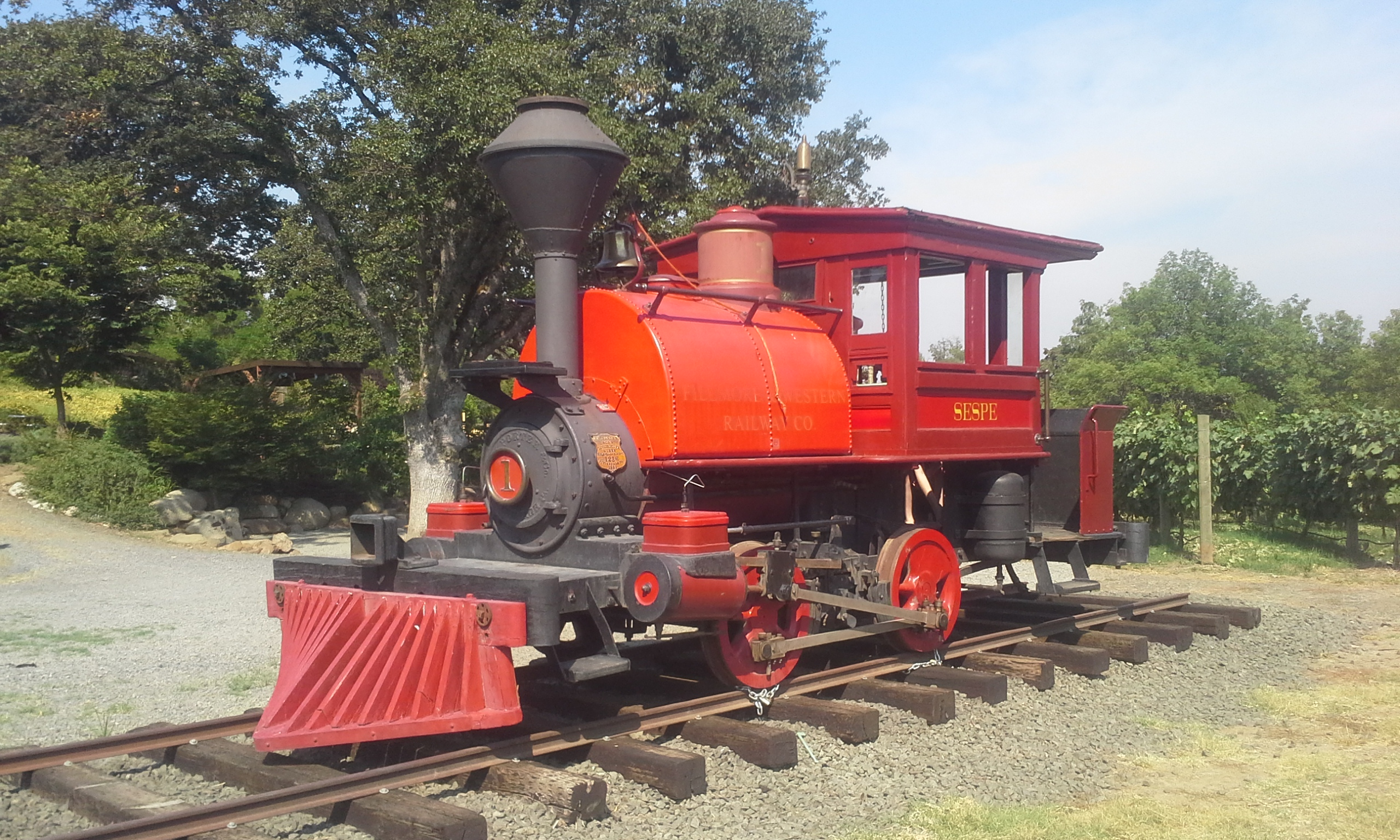
Rogue River Valley Railroad number 1, built in 1891.

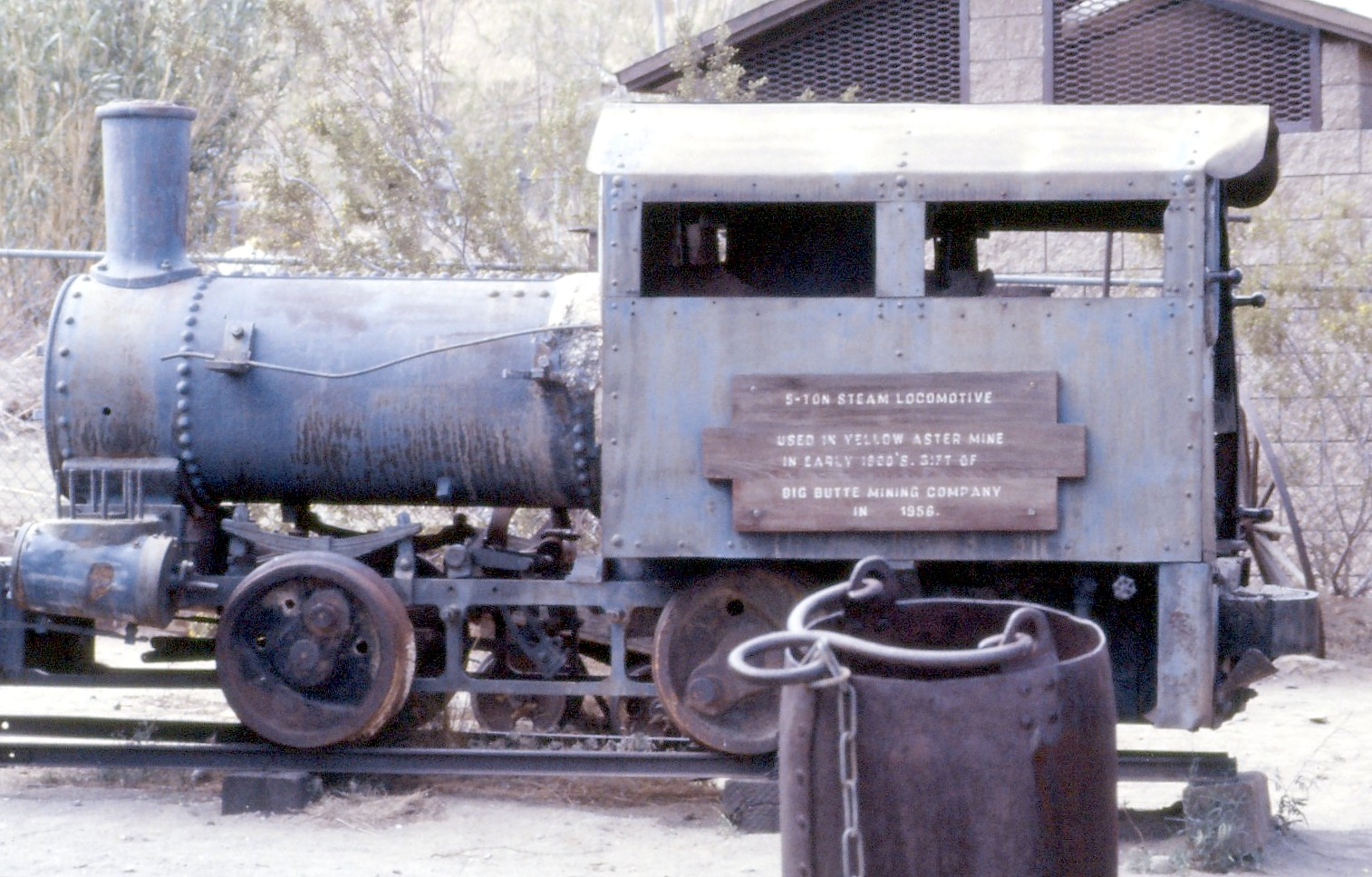
Yellow Aster Mine Porter number 3, built in 1909

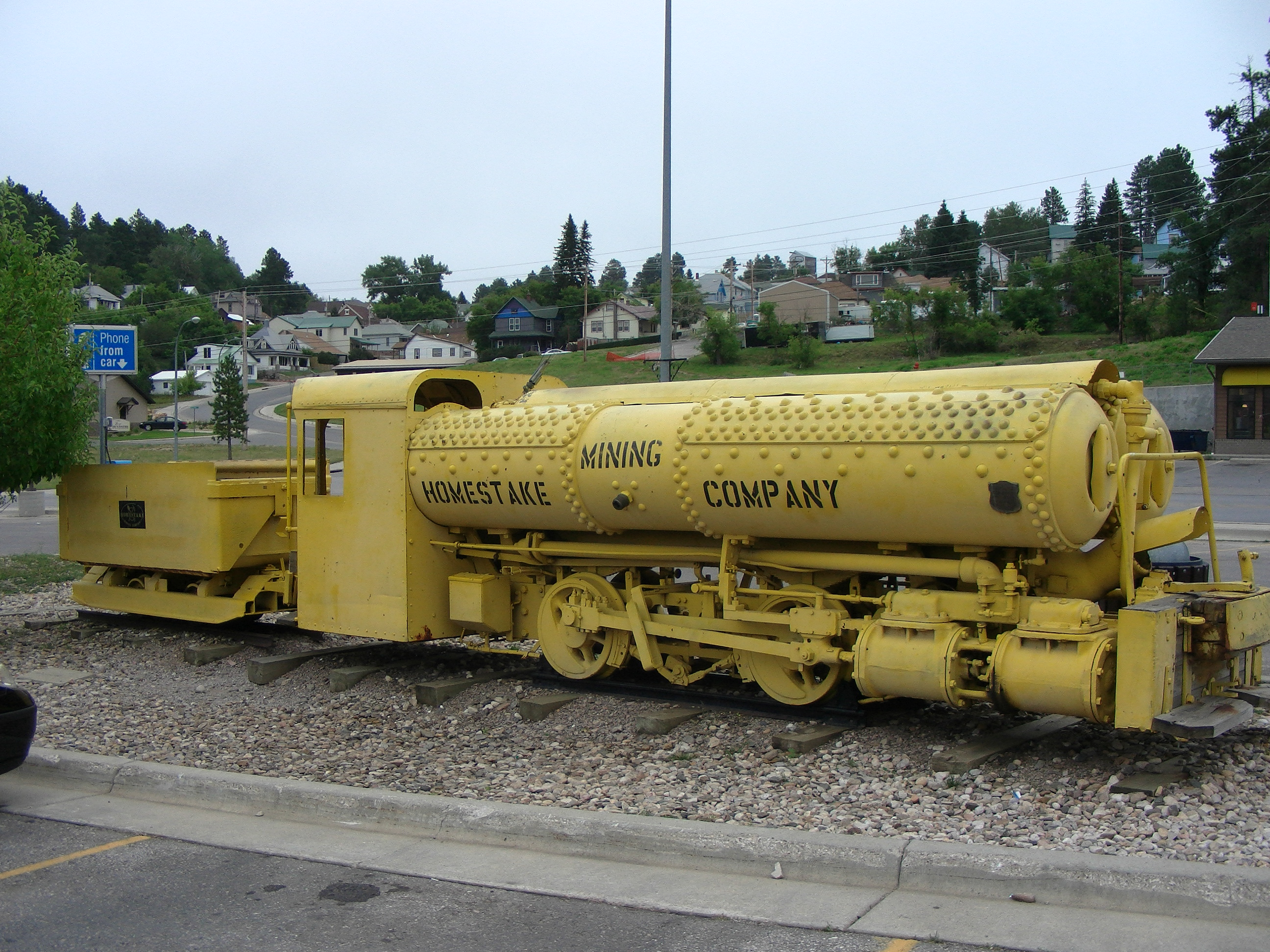
Compressed-air locomotive used at the Homestake Mine, 1928–1961

== See also ==
- List of locomotive builders
- List of preserved H. K. Porter locomotives
