= Nickel Plate Road 779 =

Preserved NKP S-3 class 2-8-4 locomotive

Coordinates: 40°44′18″N 84°5′21″W

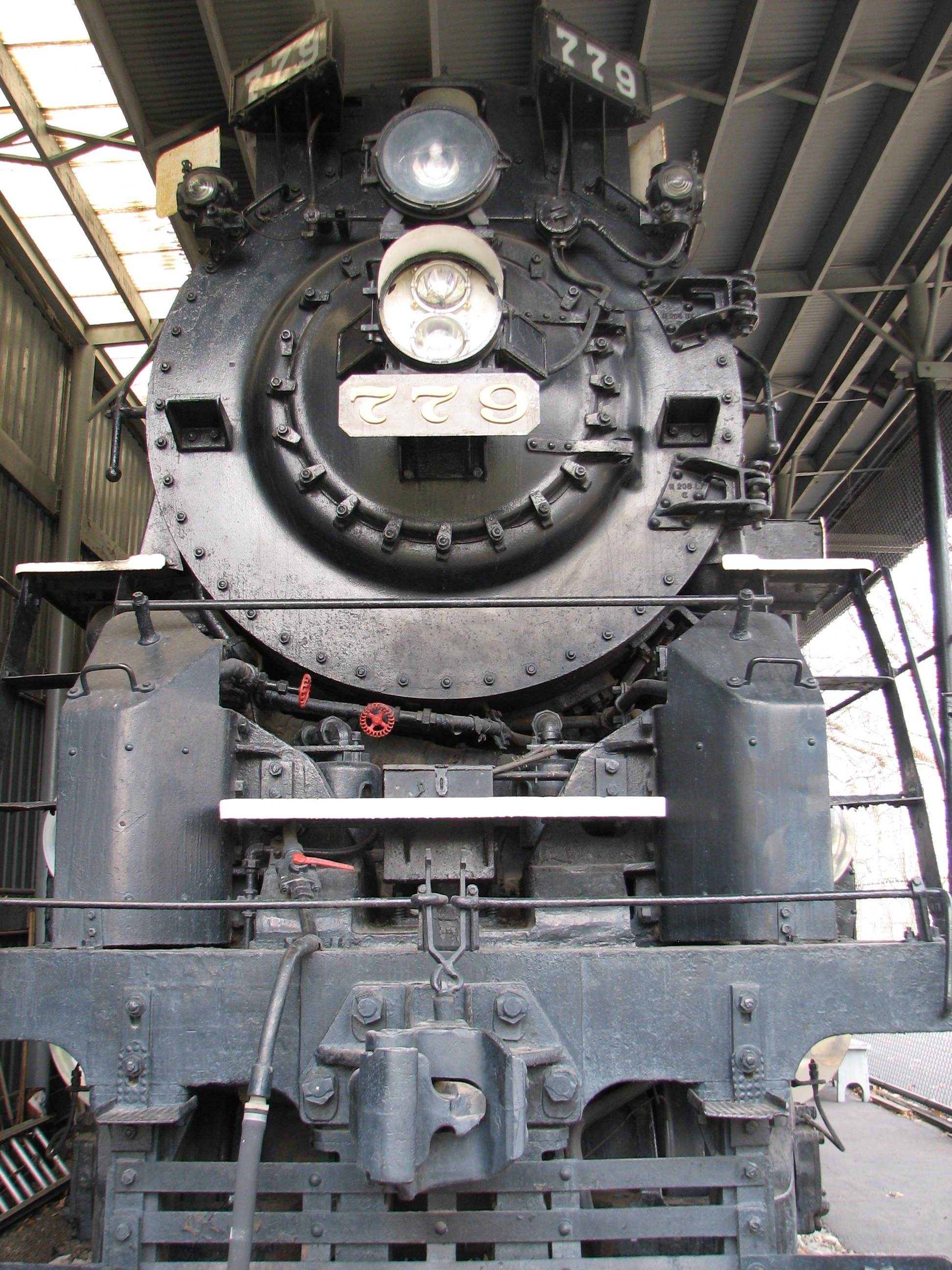
- NKP 779 pictured at Lincoln Park in Lima, Ohio
Type and origin
- Power type: Steam
- Builder: Lima Locomotive Works
- Serial number: 9380
- Build date: May 13, 1949
Specifications
- Configuration
  - Whyte: 2-8-4
  - UIC: 1'D2'h
- Gauge: 4 ft 8 1/2 in (1,435 mm) standard gauge
- Leading dia.: 36 in (0.914 m)
- Driver dia.: 69 in (1.753 m)
- Trailing dia.: 43 in (1.092 m)
- Length: 100 ft 8 3/4 in (30.70 m)
- Height: 15 ft 8 in (4.78 m)
- Adhesive weight: 264,300 lb (119,900 kg; 119.9 t)
- Loco weight: 444,300 lb (201,500 kg; 201.5 t)
- Total weight: 808,820 lb (366,870 kg; 366.87 t)
- Fuel type: Coal
- Fuel capacity: 44,000 lb (20,000 kg; 20 t) 22 short tons (20.0 t; 19.6 long tons)
- Water cap.: 22,000 US gal (83,000 L; 18,000 imp gal)
- Boiler: 89.0625 in (2.26 m) diameter × 42 ft (12.80 m) length
- Boiler pressure: 245 psi (1.69 MPa)
- Superheater: Elesco
- Cylinders: Two, outside
- Cylinder size: 25 in × 34 in (635 mm × 864 mm)
- Valve gear: Baker
- Valve type: Piston valves
- Loco brake: Air
- Train brakes: Air
- Couplers: Knuckle
Performance figures
- Maximum speed: 70 mph (113 km/h)
- Tractive effort: 64,135 lbf (285.3 kN)
- Factor of adh.: 4.12
Career
- Operators: Nickel Plate Road
- Class: S-3
- Number in class: 80 (Entire 2-8-4 fleet on the Nickel Plate Road). L-H built 10 of these S-3s for the NKP.
- Numbers: NKP 779
- Nicknames: The Last S-3; NKP's Last Steam Engine; Last Berkshire; Lincoln Park's Locomotive
- Retired: 1958
- Preserved: 1966
- Current owner: City of Lima, Ohio
- Disposition: On static display

Nickel Plate Road 779 is a S-3 class 2-8-4 "Berkshire" type steam locomotive, built in May 1949 by the Lima Locomotive Works (LLW) for the New York, Chicago and St. Louis Railroad, (reporting mark NKP) completed on May 13, 1949, for use on fast freight trains. It was the last new steam locomotive to be delivered to the Nickel Plate Road, and alongside L&N 1991, another 2-8-4 for the Louisville and Nashville, is the last of 36 steam engines completed by Lima-Hamilton from 1947 to 1949, and the final 2-8-4 locomotive on standard gauge completed in the world. L-H's first diesel, A-3080 demonstrator #1000 was completed the same day as #779. NKP also received the first production A-3080, NKP #305, one of 4 delivered by Lima-Hamilton in 1949.

Before its retirement in 1958, the locomotive had logged 677,095 miles. In 1966, the locomotive was donated to the City of Lima, Ohio, and placed on display in Lincoln Park, where it remains to date.

== See also ==
- Nickel Plate Road 757
- Nickel Plate Road 759
- Nickel Plate Road 763
- Nickel Plate Road 765
- Pere Marquette 1225
- Chesapeake and Ohio 2716
- Chesapeake and Ohio 2755
