= Flagg Coal Company 75 =

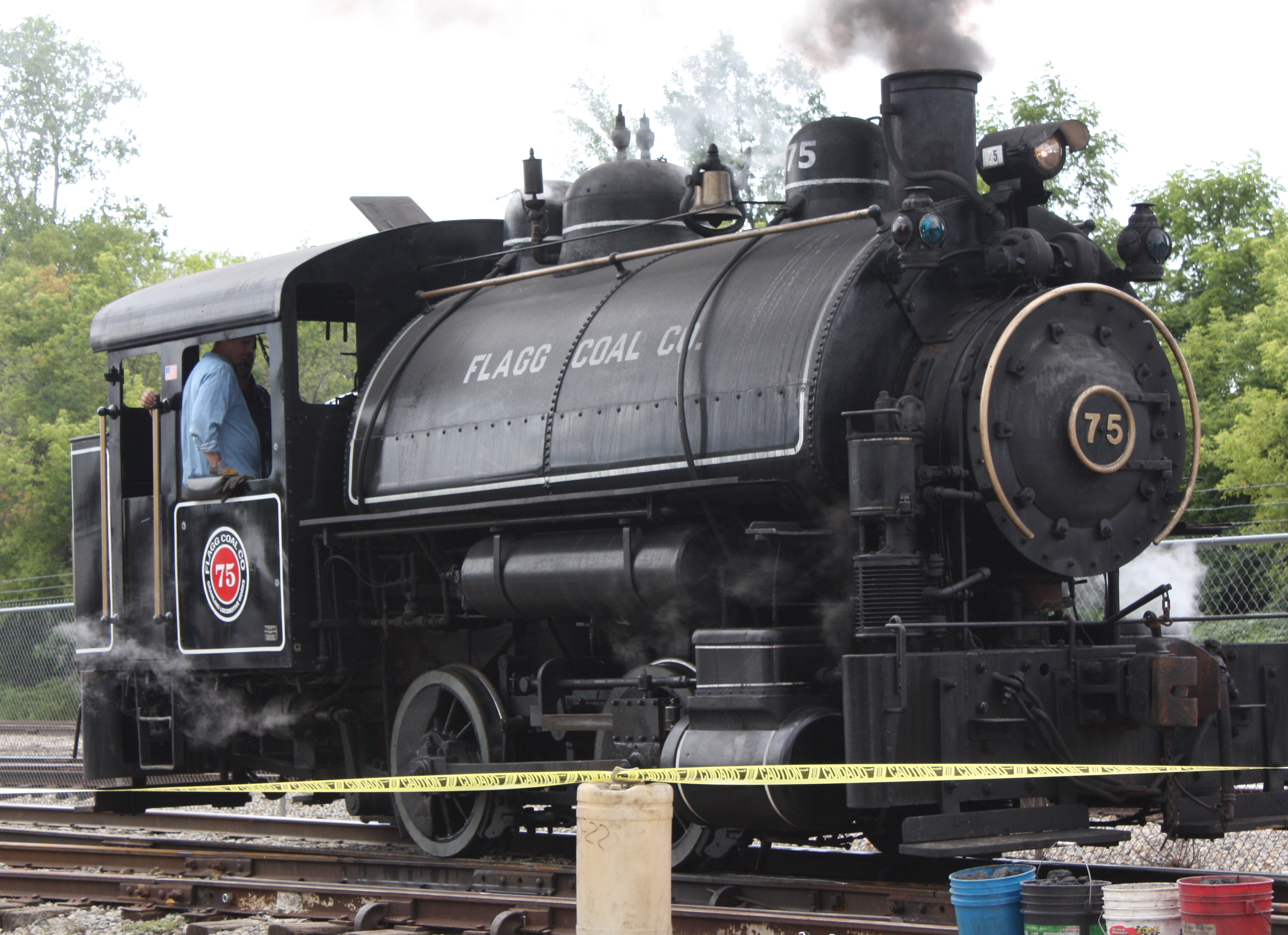
- Flagg Coal at Train Festival 2009 in Owosso, Michigan
Type and origin
- Power type: Steam
- Builder: Vulcan Iron Works
- Serial number: 3972
- Build date: December 1930
Specifications
- Configuration
  - Whyte: 0-4-0ST
  - UIC: B
- Gauge: 4 ft 8 1/2 in (1,435 mm)
- Driver dia.: 38 in (965 mm)
- Adhesive weight: 82,000 lb (37.2 metric tons)
- Loco weight: 82,000 lb (37.2 metric tons)
- Fuel type: Coal
- Boiler pressure: 150 lbf/in^{2} (1.03 MPa)
- Cylinders: Two, outside
- Cylinder size: 14 in × 22 in (356 mm × 559 mm)
- Valve gear: Stephenson
- Valve type: Slide valves
- Loco brake: Air
- Train brakes: Air
- Couplers: Knuckle
Performance figures
- Tractive effort: 18,325 lbf (81.51 kN)
Career
- Operators: Flagg Coal Company; Solvay Process Quarry; Steam Railroading Institute (leased)
- Numbers: FCC 2; SPQ 75; FCC 75
- Locale: Michigan
- Delivered: December 1930
- Retired: 1953
- Restored: October 2001
- Current owner: John and Barney Gramling
- Disposition: Operational

Flagg Coal Company 75 is an 0-4-0ST "Switcher" type steam locomotive, built for the Flagg Coal Company in December 1930 by the Vulcan Iron Works. It is owned by John and Byron Gramling, the engine was loaned in 2002 to the Steam Railroading Institute in Owosso, Michigan where it is used for demonstrations and for powering train rides and excursions. Originally numbered Flagg Coal Company 2, the locomotive's number was changed to 75 when it was sold to the Solvay Process Quarry in 1935. It never actually wore "Flagg Coal Company 75" during its service life.

== History ==
No. 75 was built in December 1930 by the Vulcan Iron Works as No. 2 for the Flagg Coal Company of Avoca, Pennsylvania, where it was primarily used as a switcher engine. In 1935, it was sold to the Solvay Process Co. in Jamesville, New York, where it was renumbered to No. 75. It would continue to work in revenue service until 1953 when it was retired and put into storage.

That same year, No. 75 was sold along with several other locomotives to Dr. Groman for his planned Rail City Museum in Sandy Pond, New York. Although No. 75 never operated at the museum, it sat in storage outside for several years rusting away until 1991, when John and Barney Gramling purchased it to restore it to operating condition. The father-son duo fully disassembled the locomotive and moved it to their shop in Ashley, Indiana. After ten years of restoration work, No. 75 returned to service in October 2001. In 2002, John and Barney leased it to the Steam Railroading Institute, where it was used for demonstrations and excursions.

In July 2009, No. 75 traveled to Owosso, Michigan to participate in Train Festival 2009, along with seven other locomotives including Pere Marquette 1225, Nickel Plate Road 765, Southern Pacific 4449, Little River Railroad 110, Leviathan 63, Little River Railroad 1 and Viscose Company 6.

== Demonstrations ==
Flagg Coal Company 75 has traveled around the country to operate, give demonstrations and educate the public about steam locomotive operation and history. The locomotive has made a few historic appearances, such as being the first steam locomotive to operate in Port Huron, Michigan, since the early 1960s.
