= Pere Marquette 1225 =

Preserved PM N-1 class 2-8-4 locomotive

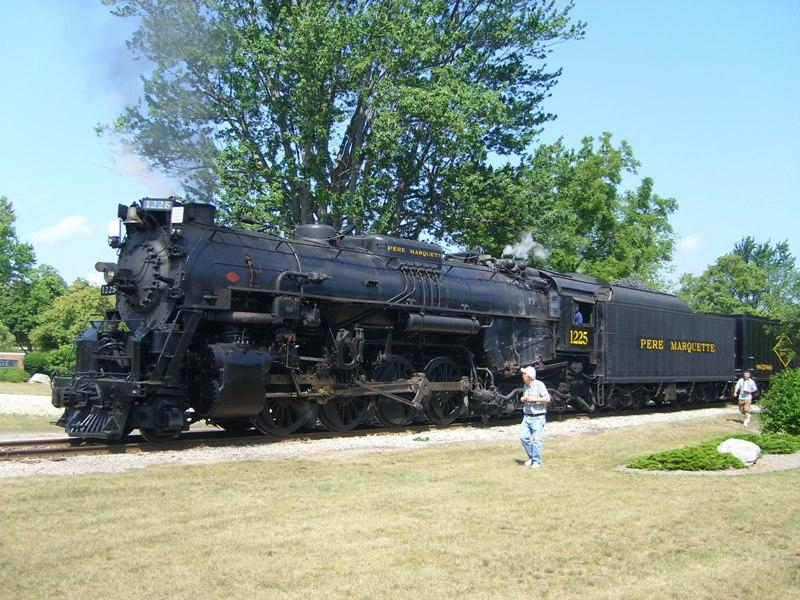
- Pere Marquette No. 1225 pulling an excursion in 2008
Type and origin
- Power type: Steam
- Builder: Lima Locomotive Works
- Serial number: 7839
- Build date: October 1941
Specifications
- Configuration
  - Whyte: 2-8-4
  - UIC: 1′D2′ h2
- Gauge: 4 ft 8 1/2 in (1,435 mm) standard gauge
- Leading dia.: 33 in (838 mm)
- Driver dia.: 69 in (1,753 mm)
- Trailing dia.: 36 in (914 mm); 43 in (1,092 mm) (trail axle)
- Minimum curve: 20°
- Length: 101 ft 8 in (30.99 m)
- Height: 15 ft 8 17/32 in (4.79 m)
- Axle load: 69,500 lb (31,500 kg)
- Adhesive weight: 277,600 lb (125,900 kg)
- Loco weight: 442,500 lb (200,700 kg)
- Total weight: 802,500 lb (364,000 kg)
- Fuel type: Coal
- Fuel capacity: 44,000 lb (20,000 kg)
- Water cap.: 22,000 US gal (83,000 L; 18,000 imp gal)
- Fuel consumption: 1 short ton (0.89 long tons) of coal per 12 miles traveled (1 metric ton per 21 km); 1,800 US gal (6,800 L; 1,500 imp gal) of water per 12 miles traveled
- Firebox
  - Grate area: 90.3 sq ft (8.4 m^{2})
- Boiler: 98 in (2,489 mm)
- Boiler pressure: 245 psi (1.69 MPa)
- Feedwater heater: Worthington Type 5-S
- Cylinders: Two, outside
- Cylinder size: 26 in × 34 in (660 mm × 864 mm)
- Valve gear: Baker
- Valve type: Piston valves
- Loco brake: Air
- Train brakes: Air
- Couplers: Knuckle
Performance figures
- Maximum speed: 70 mph (113 km/h)
- Power output: At cylinders: 2,979 hp (2.22 MW)
- Tractive effort: 69,350 lbf (308.5 kN)
- Factor of adh.: 4.00
Career
- Operators: Pere Marquette Railway; Chesapeake and Ohio Railway; Steam Railroading Institute
- Class: N-1
- Number in class: 10 of 12
- Numbers: PM 1225; C&O 2659 (never renumbered); C&O 1225
- Nicknames: The Real Polar Express
- Locale: Owosso, Michigan
- Delivered: November 1941
- Retired: 1951
- Preserved: June 1957
- Restored: November 30, 1985
- Current owner: Steam Railroading Institute
- Disposition: Operational
- Pere Marquette Railway Steam Locomotive No. 1225
- U.S. National Register of Historic Places
- Location within Michigan Location within the United States
- Interactive map
- Location: 405 S Washington St, Owosso, Michigan
- Coordinates: 42°59′35″N 84°09′53″W
- Built: 1941
- Built by: Lima Locomotive Works
- NRHP reference No.: 94000744
- Added to NRHP: July 31, 1994

Pere Marquette 1225 is an N-1 class 2-8-4 "Berkshire"-type steam locomotive, built in October 1941 by the Lima Locomotive Works (LLW) for the Pere Marquette Railway (PM) in Lima, Ohio.

No. 1225 was in regular service with the PM until 1947, when the railroad merged into the Chesapeake and Ohio Railway, and then ran on C&O's Michigan lines until 1951.

Instead of being scrapped like other Berkshires, No. 1225 was acquired by Michigan State University in 1957 and put on static display. From 1971 to 1988, the Michigan State University Railroad Club worked to restore it to operational status, an effort that culminated with its first excursion run in 1988. As of 2026, the locomotive is operated by the Steam Railroading Institute in excursion service on the Great Lakes Central Railroad out of Owosso, Michigan.

The locomotive is listed on the National Register of Historic Places. No. 1225 and sister No. 1223 are the only surviving Pere Marquette steam locomotives. It was the basis for the titular locomotive in the 2004 Christmas film The Polar Express.

== History ==
=== Revenue service ===
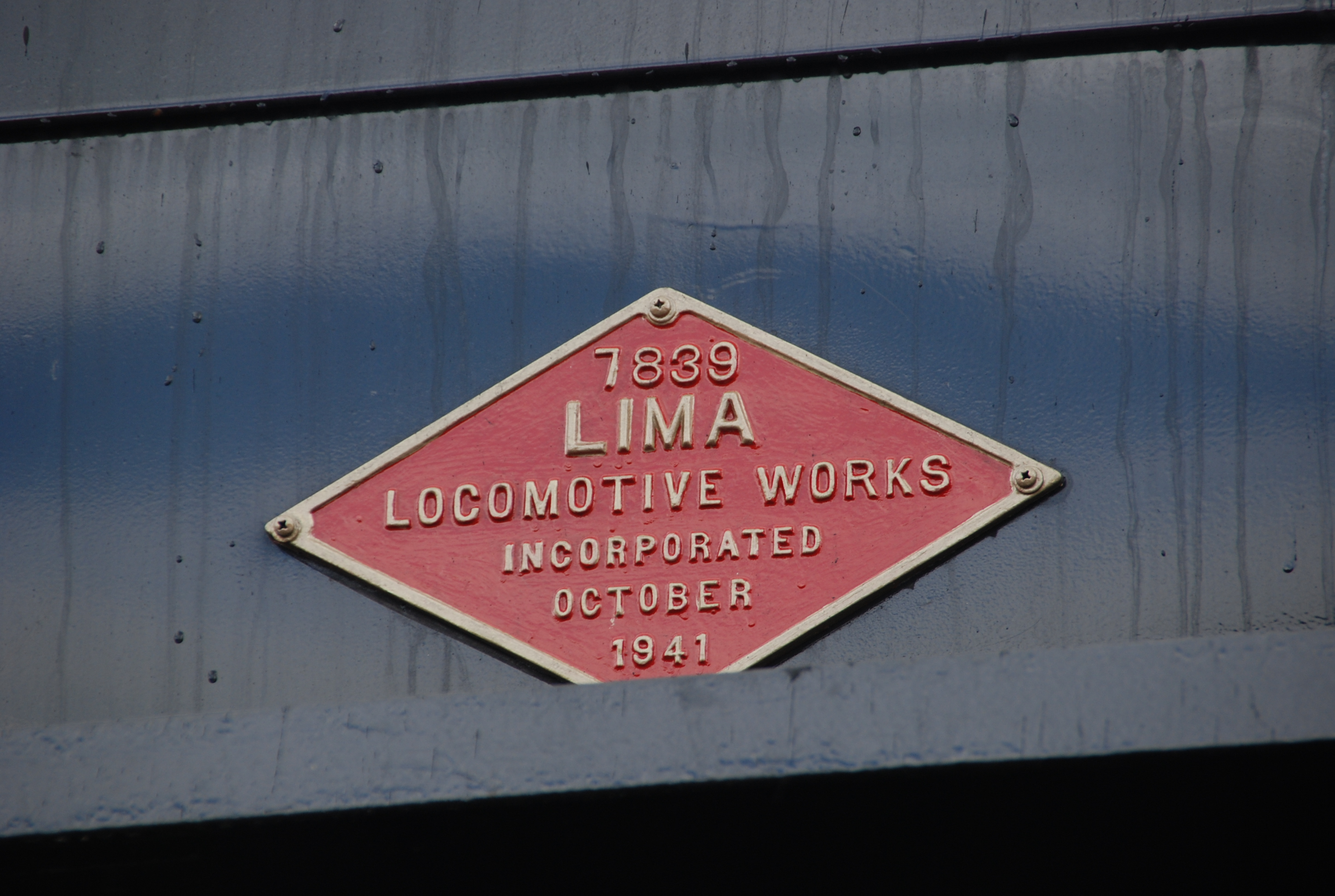
No. 1225's builder's plate

The Pere Marquette Railway ordered three classes of 2-8-4 steam locomotives from Lima Locomotive Works (LLW) in Lima, Ohio: class N in 1937 (Nos. 1201–1215), class N-1 in 1941 (Nos. 1216–1227), and class N-2 in 1944 (Nos. 1228–1239). The N-1 class included No. 1225, built for $200,000 in October 1941.

The PM used No. 1225 to shuttle steel and wartime freight between Detroit, Saginaw, Flint and northern Indiana steel mills.

The 1200s remained on the roster through the PM's merger into the Chesapeake and Ohio Railway in 1947. C&O renumbered them: class N to 2685–2699, class N-1 to 2650–2661, and class N-2 to 2670–2681. But under the merger agreement, only the N class were repainted into C&O livery; N-1 and N-2 locomotives retained the PM colors.

In 1951, the C&O began to dieselize the Pere Marquette division. Most of the N class locomotives were retired; Nos. 1207, 1225, and 1228 were stored out of service in Wyoming, Michigan. All but Nos. 1223 and 1225 were scrapped between 1954 and 1957.

=== Donation to the MSU ===
In 1955, C&O chairman Cyrus Eaton was trying to find a way to keep steam locomotives from the scrapyard. He asked Forest Akers, a Michigan State University trustee and the former VP of Dodge Motors, whether the university would be interested in having one so that engineering students would have a piece of real equipment to study. Akers proposed the idea to the university's president John Hannah, who accepted the gift. But when Hannah told the dean of the College of Engineering about it, the dean said that Engineering was not interested in an obsolete locomotive. Hannah then called up Rollin Baker, director of the MSU Museum, and told him he was getting a locomotive. The C&O instructed the yardmaster at New Buffalo to send a locomotive to the Wyoming Shops for a cosmetic restoration and repainting with the name Chesapeake and Ohio on the side. Lighted number boards were added as was the standard for C&O engines, though the PM never used them. The Michigan State Trust for Railway Preservation, operating at the Steam Railway Institute, later removed them. No. 1225 was the last engine in the line—i.e., the easiest to get out.

In June 1957, the locomotive was brought to campus in East Lansing, Michigan. It remained on static display near Spartan Stadium for more than a decade. A young Chris Van Allsburg used to stop by No. 1225 on football weekends on his way to the game with his father. He later said that the engine was the inspiration for his 1985 book, The Polar Express.

=== MSU Railroad Club ===
Until 1966, the university paid to paint and display the engine. In 1969, a group of students formed the MSU Railroad Club. Steve Reeves, a student and part-time employee of the museum, whose responsibility was to display No. 1225 on football weekends, sent out a notice in the State News that the Railroad Club would be meeting. Those early meetings did not discuss the restoration of No. 1225. Instead, they were slideshows of locomotives various members had seen on trips across the US, most of which were diesels. In 1970, Randy Paquette suggested the club restore No. 1225 to running condition; the following year, they began with Baker's permission. Baker later said restoring a locomotive was far more in keeping with his preferred image of the university than campus protests. Jack Breslin, the university vice president, was not so sure. After the club started removing the sheet metal and exposing a rusty boiler, Breslin sent Baker to the engine with two messages: paint No. 1225 to keep it looking good, and the day the students stop working on the locomotive is the day the torches come out. No. 1225 was safe as long as the students kept working on it. To emphasize, he had the hopper car next to it cut up for scrap the next week.

The students fired up the boiler in 1975 and sounded No. 1225's whistle for the first time in two decades. The MSU Railroad Club looked to No. 1223 at the State Fairgrounds for parts. The Detroit Model Railroad Club, then custodians of that engine, objected, so needed parts were fabricated. As of today, No. 1223 is on static display in a riverside park in Grand Haven, Michigan.

In 1976, Chuck Julian asked to Baker if he understood what members were asking in 1970, when they said that they wanted to restore the locomotive. Baker said that he fully understood. He thought that he would rather students be known for being involved in restoring a locomotive than known for protesting the war.

=== A new home ===
In 1977, Edgar Harden became the university's interim president. Chuck Julian, as president of the MSU Railroad Club, told Harden that the club had fired up the locomotive, and it was nearing operability, and asked whether the university would allow its operation. Harden said no, adding that that if the MSU Railroad Club wanted to run No. 1225, it should form a 501(c)(3) corporation and then he would give them the locomotive.

In that meeting, Harden told Julian that the university was closing the Shaw Lane Power Plant and planned to pull up the tracks. The railroad had informed the university that it did not want to maintain a switch on a line not being used. With no switch, there was no need to keep the track. If the club wanted to be able to get No. 1225 off the display track and onto the mainline, it needed to move it soon. Dr. Harden gave the MSURRC permission to connect the display track to the siding and move the engine over to a part of the track near the police station, with the provision that the club provide a bond, remove the fence, stairs and all of its belongings from the display site, then tear up the track put down along with the display track. The club also had to repair the sidewalk that it needed to go through after it was done and generally clean up the site.

Colin Williams, the owner of the Williams Brothers Asphalt Paving Co. in Ionia, Michigan, provided the club with a surety bond, a dump truck, a front-end loader and a bulldozer plus operators to run the equipment which was used to build the grade. Club members then tore up the track next to No. 1225 and laid it down behind it. The locomotive was then rolled down the tracks. Julian, Dave Jones, an equipment operator from the company (Dick Grieves), and a group of Hmong refugees who volunteered their time, then spent the next three days with the Williams Brothers' equipment restoring the site, including casting a new concrete sidewalk. The company sent a grader from Ionia to fine grade the site after they were done with the bulk cleanup, including loading debris into the dump truck and rails onto a flatbed and hauling all of it to Ionia.

Harden said that if the railroad club could find another place on campus that was suitable, it could move No. 1225 to it. He assigned Ted Simmons of the physical plant, along with the head of the Landscape Arts Department, the task of working with Julian to find a place on campus. Simmons was not willing to give up a siding at Power Plant 65 for No. 1225. The club would need to build one if the locomotive wanted one. The club would not be able to build a cheap structure. If the club or later the trust wanted one, it would need to be built by contractors after the university approved the design. This was beyond the financial capability of the club. No. 1225 was rolled down the track, off campus and behind the Quality Dairy store on Trowbridge Road. The club and supporters of "Project 1225" formed the Michigan State Trust for Railway Preservation in 1978. Chuck Julian, then president of the club, became the Trust's first president. Soon after, the MSTRP was given ownership of No. 1225, by the MSU.

Club members and the new Trust's members began looking for a new site. The Ann Arbor Railroad had gone bankrupt at the time and the state of Michigan became the owner of its assets. Hank Londo, a member of the club, spoke to his state senator and arranged for the new MSTRP to lease the former AAR engine shop in Owosso. After completing work on No. 1225's lead truck axle, the locomotive itself, the Railway Post Office car, and all of the club's equipment were moved to Owosso. This was a great place to move because the engine shop had a lot of equipment that would be useful in restoring No. 1225.

=== Excursion service ===
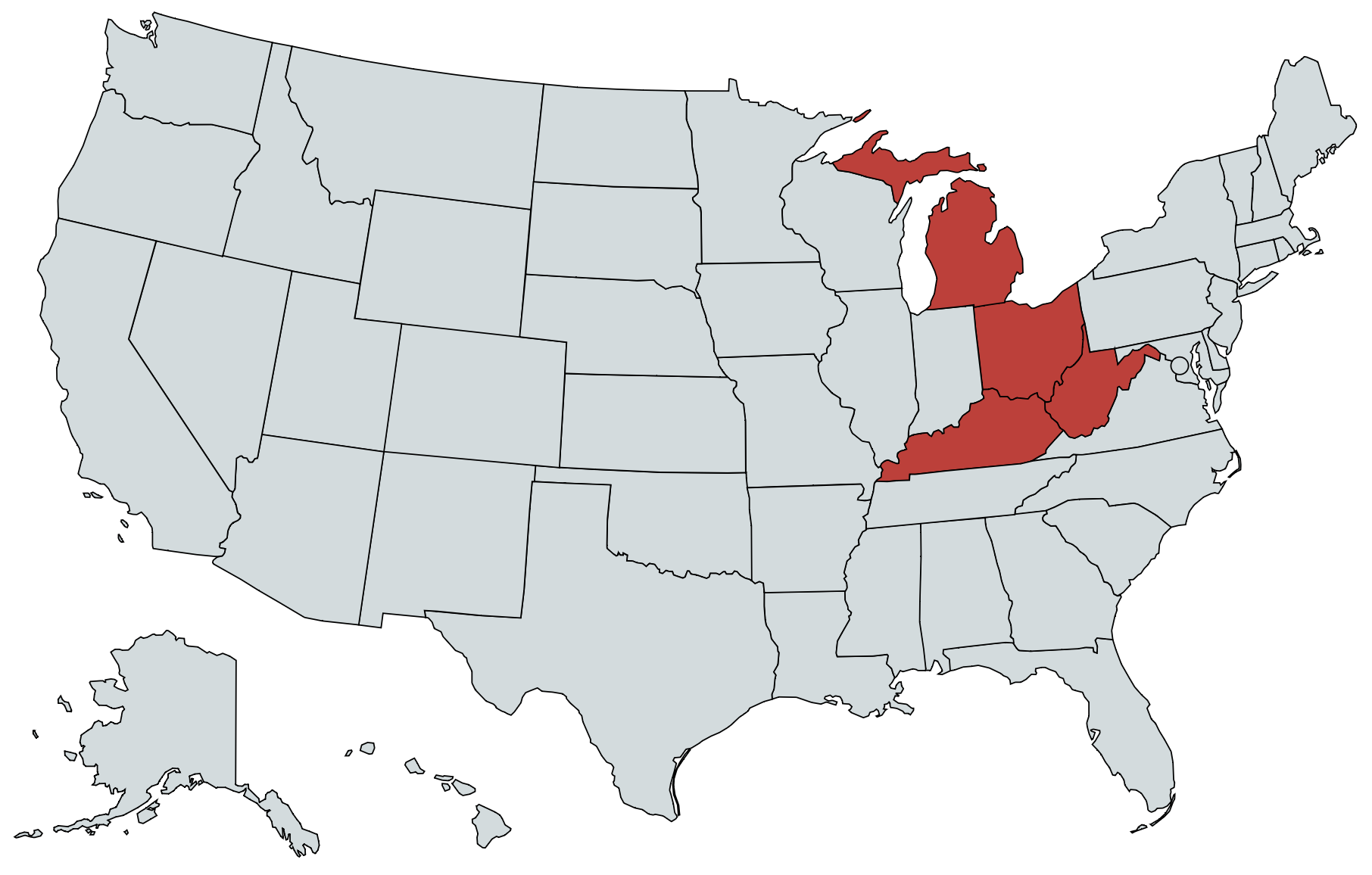
US states visited by No. 1225 in excursion service

On November 30, 1985, No. 1225 moved under its own power for the first time since its retirement in 1951. In 1988, it pulled its first excursion: a 17-mile trip between Owosso and St. Charles, Michigan. In August 1991, No. 1225 and Nickel Plate Road No. 765 pulled a 31-car passenger train during the National Railway Historical Society's annual convention in Huntington, West Virginia.

In June 1995, No. 1225 was to join Milwaukee Road 261 on a doubleheader excursion from Michigan, through Canada and into New York before continuing south to Scranton, Pennsylvania, for the opening ceremony of Steamtown National Historic Site. After concerns were raised that No. 1225's cylinders might not clear the Detroit River tunnel, a longer alternate route was offered. The Trust asked the Steamtown organizers for extra money to cover the longer route, but the funds were not immediately available and No. 1225's participation was cancelled.

Some years later, the Trust began using the name "Steam Railroading Institute" to better reflect its goals, registering the new name as a DBA (doing business as) with the state of Michigan, while retaining its official name of MSTRP.

On July 23–26, 2009, No. 1225 attended the Train Festival in Owosso to raise money for its 2010-2013 FRA overhaul. It was unable to haul excursions during the festival because five of its flues failed on July 24, but it remained on display, along with No. 765—the Berkshires' first meeting in eighteen years. Nos. 1225 and 765 met up twice more that year, with a photo freight in August and an excursion in October.

The flues failed again on December 5, so in January 2010, No. 1225 went down for its required 15-year inspection. The subsequent overhaul, which replaced deteriorated firebox sheets, consumed about $900,000 raised by small and large donations of money and labor.

On October 20, 2013, the locomotive was fired up for a test run and moved again for the first time since 2009. It is to run until 2028 when its next overhaul work is due.

As of 2014, No. 1225 operates excursion trains over the Great Lakes Central Railroad (formally Tuscola and Saginaw Bay Railway) several times per year, including operations that leave Owosso and going to cities such as Alma, Clare, Mt. Pleasant, and Cadillac in Michigan. Since 2004, No. 1225 has hauled winter weekend excursions to Ashley between Thanksgiving and the middle of December as the "North Pole Express".

In 2021, No. 1225 had its lead truck axle, trailing truck axles, and tender trucks upgraded with roller bearings. In 2022, FMW Solutions helped to overhaul the locomotive's wheels and running gear. In late 2023, No. 1225 returned to service with a new dual-beam headlight, a digital thermocouple, a second Nathan mechanical lubricator from Nickel Plate Road No. 757, and a temperature sensor and alarm systems for the crew to monitor the brass and bearing boxes. In 2024, No. 1225 hauled some summer and fall excursions until being sidelined by problems with the superheaters; diesel locomotives hauled the year's remaining excursions. In November 2025, the locomotive briefly returned to service before being sidelined by an overheated bearing. On December 4, No. 1225 finally returned to service.

In January 2026, No. 1225 was masqueraded as Chesapeake and Ohio No. 2699 for the Lerro Productions daytime and nighttime photo charter. In May 2026, the locomotive was used for a Lake State Railway employee event. It returned to its original home base at Saginaw, Michigan yard for the first time since 1951. It headed multiple excursions southbound over the course of the weekend (May 16 & 17). On May 18, No. 1225 was utilized to pull a 90-car empty grain hopper train on the Lake State Railway's former Pere Marquette mainline from Novi to Saginaw, pulling its first revenue freight train in nearly 17 years; No. 1225 was last used to pull a freight train on June 12, 2009, where it pulled 58 grain hoppers as part of a test run on the Great Lakes Central Railroad's St. Charles Branch. The Steam Railroading Institute would announce later that week on the organization's YouTube channel that the freight run on the LSRC was a test of no. 1225's endurance, and that it was officially making preparations to ferry the locomotive to Virginia to operate excursions in a new partnership with the Buckingham Branch Railroad during the fall of 2026. However, due to logistical problems between the Steam Railroading Institute and Norfolk Southern, who would be moving No. 1225 from Michigan to Virginia, the two parties were unable to secure a date for the ferry move, resulting in the cancellation of the planned excursions on the Buckingham Branch. The Steam Railroading Institute stated it was investigating alternative options for excursions involving No. 1225 for the fall 2026 season.

== Influence on The Polar Express ==
No. 1225 was the prototype for the computer-generated locomotive in the 2004 Christmas motion-capture film The Polar Express. In 2002, Warner Bros. was given copies of the blueprints, which had been saved from oblivion and donated to the MSURRC by Hank Truer. The locomotive's sounds were also recorded and used in the movie.

The film was based on the Caldecott Medal-winning book of the same name, written and illustrated by Chris Van Allsburg. As a child, Van Allsburg attended football games at Michigan State's Spartan Stadium, next to which No. 1225 was on static display. He recalls playing on this engine many times. "I remember that train on campus, ...I can't believe it's the same train! I climbed on that train. I actually stood on it". The locomotive's road number coincides with the date of Christmas Day in the month-day calendar style: 12/25.

== See also ==
- New York Central 3001
- Nickel Plate Road 759
- Chesapeake and Ohio 2716
- Chicago and North Western 175
- Chicago and North Western 1385
- Grand Trunk Western 6325

== Bibliography ==
- Keefe, Kevin (2016). Twelve Twenty-Five: The Life and Times of a Steam Locomotive (1st ed.). Michigan State University Press. ISBN 978-1-61186-202-7.
- Million, Arthur B.; Dixon, Jr., Thomas W. (1984). Pere Marquette Power (1st ed.). The Chesapeake and Ohio Historical Society, Inc. ISBN 0-87012-472-2.
