= Nickel Plate Road 763 =

Preserved NKP S-2 class 2-8-4 locomotive

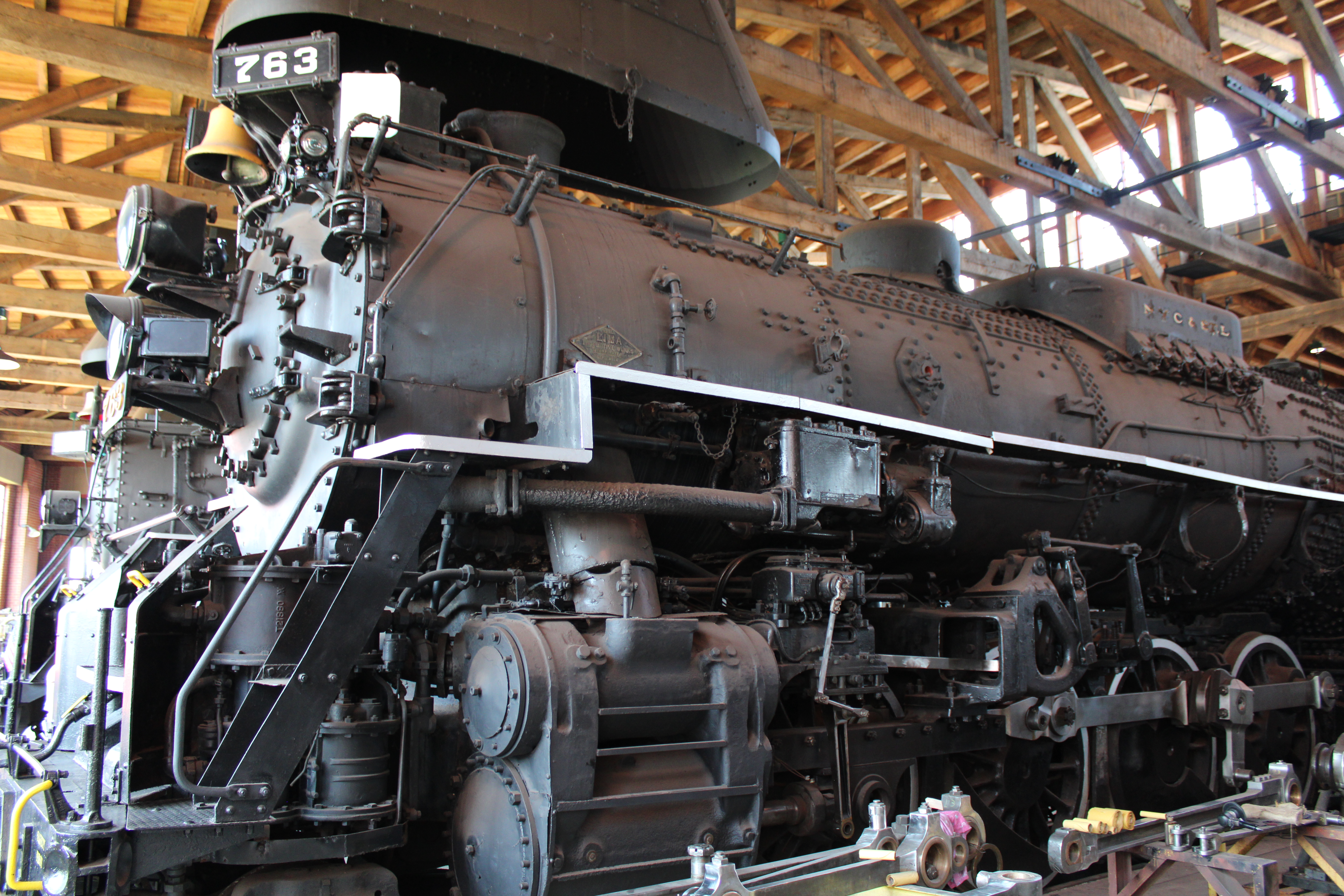
- Nickel Plate No. 763 on static display inside the Age of Steam Roundhouse.
Type and origin
- Power type: Steam
- Builder: Lima Locomotive Works
- Serial number: 8671
- Build date: August 1944
Specifications
- Configuration
  - Whyte: 2-8-4
  - UIC: 1'D2'h
- Gauge: 4 ft 8 1/2 in (1,435 mm) standard gauge
- Leading dia.: 36 in (0.914 m)
- Driver dia.: 69 in (1.753 m)
- Trailing dia.: 43 in (1.092 m)
- Length: 100 ft 8 3/4 in (30.70 m)
- Height: 15 ft 8 in (4.78 m)
- Adhesive weight: 264,300 lb (119,900 kg; 119.9 t)
- Loco weight: 440,800 lb (199,900 kg; 199.9 t)
- Total weight: 802,500 lb (364,000 kg; 364.0 t)
- Fuel type: Coal
- Fuel capacity: 44,000 lb (20,000 kg; 20 t) 22 short tons (20.0 t; 19.6 long tons)
- Water cap.: 22,000 US gal (83,000 L; 18,000 imp gal)
- Boiler: 89.0625 in (2.26 m) diameter × 42 ft (12.80 m) length
- Boiler pressure: 245 psi (1.69 MPa)
- Superheater: Elesco
- Cylinders: Two, outside
- Cylinder size: 25 in × 34 in (635 mm × 864 mm)
- Valve gear: Baker
- Valve type: Piston valves
- Loco brake: Air
- Train brakes: Air
- Couplers: Knuckle
Performance figures
- Maximum speed: 70 mph (113 km/h)
- Tractive effort: 64,135 lbf (285.3 kN)
- Factor of adh.: 4.12
Career
- Operators: Nickel Plate Road
- Class: S-2
- Number in class: 9
- Numbers: NKP 763
- Delivered: September 1, 1944
- Retired: June 1958
- Current owner: Age of Steam Roundhouse
- Disposition: On static display, awaiting possible restoration

Nickel Plate Road 763 is a S-2 class 2-8-4 "Berkshire" type steam locomotive. It was built in August 1944 by the Lima Locomotive Works in Lima, Ohio, as the ninth engine of its class. It is a high powered fast freight locomotive that carried perishables between Chicago and Buffalo, New York.

== History ==
=== Revenue service ===
The engine was built in August 1944 by the Lima Locomotive Works. Nickel Plate 763's career consisted of pulling fast freights of perishables between Chicago and Buffalo. Pulling trains at up to 70 MPH, these engines quickly gained a reputation as high-speed brutes on the track. In 1958, due to lowering part supplies and the demand for more cheap and efficient motive power, the Nickel Plate removed all of its S-2's from service and sat dormant. The sister engine of No. 763, 765 was recommissioned to provide steam heat to a streamlined passenger train, and was the last Berkshire under steam for the Nickel Plate.

=== Retirement ===
Number 763 was ultimately retired in June 1958, and sat for nearly 2 years with the label of "stored serviceable" until 1960, when most of the Berkshires on the Nickel Plate were sent to scrap yards. Six Berks were preserved, including No. 763. No. 763 was put in a museum until in 1966, when the Norfolk & Western, NKP's new owner moved her to outdoor display at Wasena Park in Roanoke, Virginia.

In 1976, No. 763 was moved to New Jersey for a possible overhaul as it was a contending locomotive to pull the American Freedom Train. Once the engine arrived it was to be checked over and restored to working condition and double head with No. 759. However, this plan fell through and No. 763 was sent back to Roanoke with Southern Pacific 4449 being chosen instead.

=== Disposition ===
After the AFT fall through, No. 763 was returned to Roanoke, where it was placed on display at the Virginia Museum of Transportation. The VMT ended up selling No. 763 to Jerry Jacobson, president of the Age of Steam Roundhouse and then CEO of Ohio Central Railroad for $125,000. In 2007, Jacobson returned No. 763 to her home state Ohio with plans to restore the locomotive to operational condition to run on the Ohio Central railroad. However, after the railroad was sold to the Genessee and Wyoming corporation, plans to run No. 763 on the Ohio Central fell through. No. 763 is now on static display inside the Age of Steam Roundhouse.

== See also ==
- Nickel Plate Road
- Nickel Plate Road 757
- Nickel Plate Road 759
- Nickel Plate Road 765
- Nickel Plate Road 779
- Age of Steam Roundhouse
