= Steam Railroading Institute =

Railroad preservation organization in Michigan

Coordinates: 42.99438°N 84.17028°W

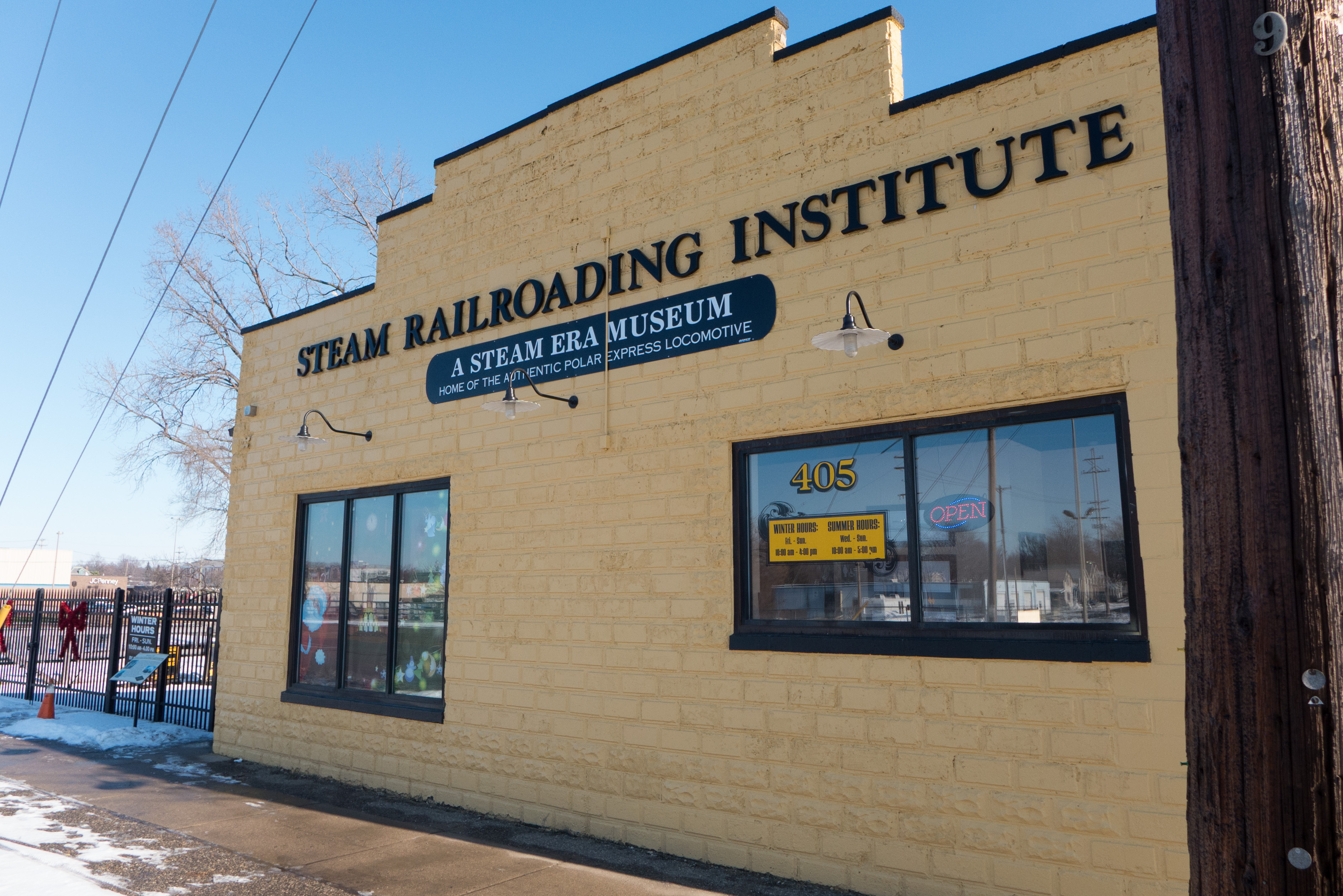
- Steam Railroading Institute building in Owosso, MI.
- Locale: Michigan
- Terminus: Owosso

Commercial operations
- Original gauge: 4 ft 8 1/2 in (1,435 mm)

Preserved operations
- Reporting mark: MSTX
- Length: 1 mile (1.6 km)
- Preserved gauge: 4 ft 8 1/2 in (1,435 mm)

Preservation history
- 1969: MSU Railroad Club Founded
- 1979: MSU Railroad Club reorganized as the Michigan State Trust for Railway Preservation, Inc. (MSTRP)
- 1983: MSTRP moved from Lansing, MI to Owosso, MI
- Headquarters: Owosso

Website
- https://michigansteamtrain.com/

The Steam Railroading Institute (reporting mark MSTX) is a non-profit organization that preserves, restores, and operates historical railroad equipment and items. Located in Owosso, Michigan, it was founded in 1969 as the Michigan State University Railroad Club and later became the Michigan State Trust for Railway Preservation before adopting its present name.

Headquartered at the old Ann Arbor Railroad railyard, the organization operates a heritage railroad that offers occasional passenger excursion trains using steam locomotives: Pere Marquette 1225 and Chicago and North Western 175. It also has passenger cars and other rolling stock.

== History ==
In the late 1950s, Chesapeake and Ohio Railway Chairman Cyrus Eaton sought to donate No. 1225, a steam locomotive recently retired by the Pere Marquette Railway, to Michigan State University's College of Engineering so the students could work on a piece of real equipment and keep the locomotive from the scrapyard. He convinced University Trustee Forest Akers, but not the dean of the College of Engineering, so University President John Hannah accepted No. 1225 as a contribution to the MSU Museum. It arrived on campus in 1957. There it sat, getting an occasional coat of paint and visits from the public on football weekends. In 1970, the year-old Michigan State University Railroad Club, at the suggestion of Randy Paquette, decided to restore No. 1225 and use it to pull excursion trains that would bring passengers to football games at the university.

But MSU had no interest in running a steam locomotive. Eventually, University President Edgar Harden proposed to MSURRC President Chuck Julian that a 501(c)(3) nonprofit organization be founded to take ownership of No. 1225. In July 1979, the Michigan State Trust for Railway Preservation was founded.

Later, the Michigan State Trust for Railway Preservation became the Steam Railroading Institute.

== Equipment ==
=== Locomotives ===
Locomotive details
Number	Image	Type	Model	Built	Builder	Status
1225		Steam	2-8-4	1941	Lima Locomotive Works	Operational
175		Steam	4-6-0	1908	American Locomotive Company	Under restoration
1313 (Mighty Mouse)		Diesel	25-ton switcher	1940s	General Electric	Operational

=== Visiting locomotives ===
Locomotive details
Number	Image	Type	Model	Built	Builder	Status	Owner	Notes
75		Steam	0-4-0	1930	Vulcan Iron Works	Operational	John and Barney Gramling	Leased from John and Barney Gramling. Operated in occasional excursion service.
7471		Diesel	SD40	1966	Electro-Motive Diesel	Operational	Precision Locomotive Leasing	Previously operated at Western Maryland Scenic Railroad and Georges Creek Railway. On lease from Precision Locomotive Leasing.
57		Diesel	GP40WH-2	1968	Electro-Motive Diesel, Morrison–Knudsen	Operational	Precision Locomotive	Ex-MARC. On lease from Precision Locomotive until 2028.

=== Former units ===
Locomotive details
Number	Type	Model	Built	Builder	Owner
10	Diesel	44-ton switcher	Unknown	Detroit and Mackinac Railway	Southern Michigan Railway Society.
76	Steam	2-8-0	1920	Baldwin Locomotive Works	B&O Railroad Museum

=== Rolling stock ===
Rolling stock details
Number / Name	Type	Built	Builder
5447, 5485, 5576, 5581, 5646	Coaches	1952/1953	Pullman Standard
147	Coach	Budd Company	1950
462	Dining car	1958	Budd Company
8652	Dining car	1956	Budd Company
361	Sleeper car	1949	Pullman Company
7	Sleeper car	1948	Pullman Company
2624 (City of Ashland)	Sleeper car	1950	Pullman Company
1363	Kitchen car	1950	St. Louis Car Company
16505	Hospital car	1953	St. Louis Car Company
4620	Combination car	1934	Pressed Steel Car Company
72332	Boxcar	1940s	Unknown
1314	Boxcar	1940s	Pullman Standard
1128, 1138	Boxcars	1920s	Unknown
X-127, X-128	Tanker cars	Unknown	Unknown
31262	Gondola car	1939	Unknown
31262	Gondola car	1947	Unknown
54211, 54263	Flatcars	Unknown	Unknown
2838, 2839	Cabooses	Unknown	Unknown
3674	Caboose	1941	Unknown
A909	Caboose	1937	Unknown
5112	Auxiliary Water Tender	Unknown	Unknown
5112	Bunk car	1920s	Unknown
15027	Burro Crane	1940s	Burro Crane Company

==== Former rolling stock ====
Locomotive details
Number	Type	Built	Builder	Owner
9936, 39970, 39975	Hi-Level cars	1956, 1964	Budd Company	Naugatuck Railroad
Unknown	Lounge cars	Unknown	Budd Company	Naugatuck Railroad

== Structures ==
=== New Buffalo Turntable ===
The turntable is a 90 ft (27 m) turntable built in 1919 to serve the Pere Marquette railyard in New Buffalo, Michigan. It served a 16-stall roundhouse until 1984, when the Chessie System closed the New Buffalo yard. The SRI acquired the turntable, moved it to its site, and lengthened it by 10 ft (3.0 m) to accommodate larger rolling stock like the PM 1225.

=== SRI Visitor Center ===
The SRI Visitor Center sits inside a renovated freight warehouse used by the Ann Arbor road. The foundation dates to the 1880s. It is speculated that the original structure, a creamery, burned down in the 1920s. The Ann Arbor used it to store grain and other freight, then leased it to Bruckman's Moving and Storage. The SRI purchased the building in 2004 and renovated it to serve as their Visitor Center, with exhibit space, a model train layout, and the museum's artifact and archives collection.
