= M. Cecil Mackey =

American university administrator

16th President of Michigan State University
- In office 1979–1985
- Preceded by: Edgar L. Harden
- Succeeded by: John A. DiBiaggio

9th President of Texas Tech University
- In office 1976–1979
- Preceded by: Grover E. Murray
- Succeeded by: Lauro Cavazos

2nd President of the University of South Florida
- In office 1971–1976
- Preceded by: John S. Allen
- Succeeded by: John Lott Brown

Personal details
- Born: January 23, 1929 Montgomery, Alabama, U.S.
- Died: February 8, 2018 (aged 89) Boca Raton, Florida, U.S.
- Education: University of Alabama (B.A., M.A.); University of Illinois (Ph.D.)

Maurice Cecil Mackey Jr. ("Cecil") (January 23, 1929 – February 8, 2018) was president of University of South Florida from 1971 to 1976, president of Texas Tech University from 1976 to 1979, and president of Michigan State University from 1979 to 1985.

Prior to these academic posts, he was director of the Office of Policy Development for the Federal Aviation Agency, director of the Office of Transportation Policy for the U.S. Department of Commerce, and assistant secretary for Policy Development for the U.S. Department of Transportation.

Mackey held a Bachelor of Arts and a Master of Arts in economics from the University of Alabama and a Ph.D. in economics from the University of Illinois where he focused on economic theory, the history of economic thought, and the relationship of government to business and finance in economics. He also held a law degree from the University of Alabama and studied postgraduate law at Harvard University.

He later was a faculty member in the Department of Economics at Michigan State University, where he taught online and hybrid courses in comparative economics, macroeconomics and general business law as well as focused-topic film study courses for the English department. Mackey was assisted in his coursework by long-time Michigan State University research and special assistant Sam Fleischer.

Mackey previously taught at the United States Air Force Academy, University of Alabama, University of Illinois, University of Maryland, and Florida State University. He died February 8, 2018.

Burial: Arlington National Cemetery, June 10, 2019

Academic offices
| Preceded by Edgar L. Harden | President of Michigan State University; 1979–1985 | Succeeded by John A. DiBiaggio |
| Preceded by Grover E. Murray | President of the Texas Tech University; 1976–1979 | Succeeded by Linda Hagemyer |
| Preceded by Harris Dean | President of the University of South Florida; 1971–1976 | Succeeded by W. Reece Smith Jr. |
