= John S. Allen =

American astronomer, university professor and university president

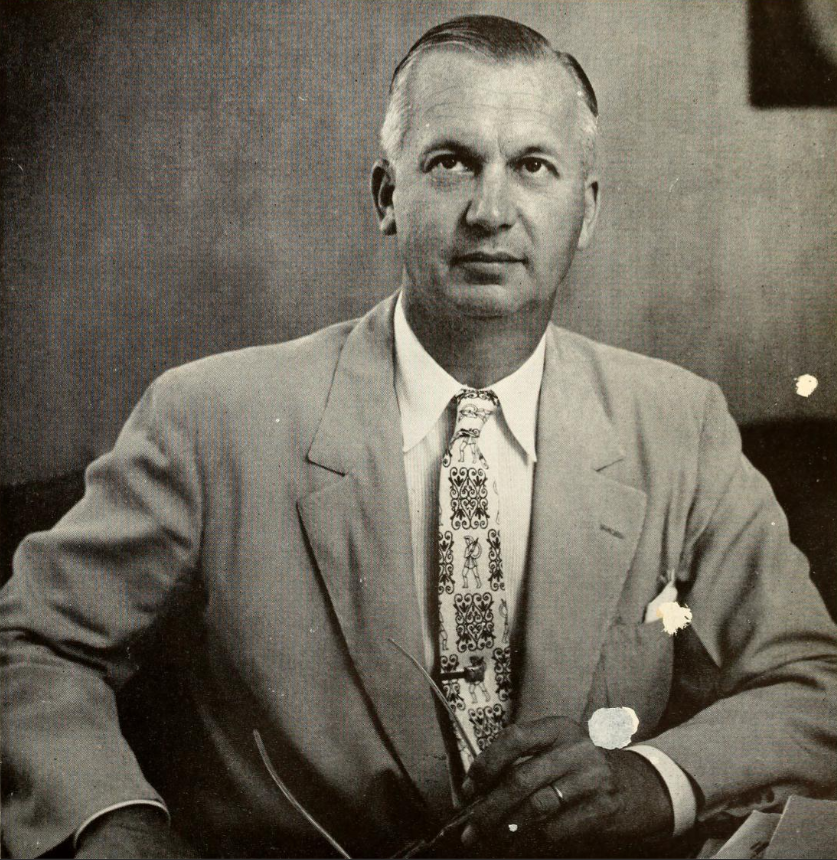
- Allen, c. 1956

1st President of the University of South Florida
- In office 1957–1970
- Succeeded by: M. Cecil Mackey

Personal details
- Born: May 13, 1907 Pendleton, Indiana, U.S.
- Died: December 27, 1982 (aged 75) Tampa, Florida, U.S.
- Spouse: Grace Carlton Allen
- Education: B.A., Earlham College, 1928; M.S., University of Minnesota, 1929; Ph.D., New York University, 1936
- Occupation: Astronomer; University Professor; University President

John Stuart Allen (May 13, 1907 – December 27, 1982) was an American astronomer, university professor and university president. He was a native of Indiana, and pursued a career as a professor of astronomy after receiving his bachelor's, master's and doctorate degrees. In 1953 Allen became the interim president of the University of Florida located in Gainesville, Florida, and subsequently became the founding president of the University of South Florida in Tampa, Florida.

== Early life and education ==
John Allen was born in Pendleton, Indiana in 1907. His parents were Quakers, and his father was a high school teacher and principal. His father imparted to him a love of education and a fascination with astronomy derived from their shared backyard observations of the night sky. Allen graduated with a Bachelor of Arts degree in mathematics from Quaker-affiliated Earlham College in Richmond, Indiana in 1928, a master's degree in astronomy from the University of Minnesota in Minneapolis in 1929, and a doctor of philosophy degree from New York University in New York City in 1936. While he was a graduate student at Minnesota, in 1933, he met and married the former Grace Carlton, an education student.

== Astronomer, professor, university founder ==
Allen began his teaching career as an instructor at the University of Minnesota, and later received an appointment as an assistant professor of astronomy at Colgate University in Hamilton, New York, where he taught for twelve years. Allen also worked for the New York State Department of Education from 1940 to 1948, where he eventually became director of the Division of Higher Education. One of his major accomplishments as higher education director, he oversaw the implementation of New York's so-called "emergency colleges"—state supported colleges created to accommodate the influx of returning World War II veterans. Over the course of his teaching and administrative career, Allen authored three textbooks and more than seventy journal articles on such topics as astronomy, higher education and veterans' education.

In 1948, president J. Hillis Miller of the University of Florida tapped Allen to be the university's new vice president; Miller had previously worked with Allen in the New York Department of Education. When Miller died unexpectedly in 1953, Allen became the interim president of the university. After his permanent successor, J. Wayne Reitz, assumed office in 1955, Allen continued to work as the executive vice president of the University of Florida until 1957. During his time at Florida, he was intimately involved in the planning of the university's new state medical school, teaching hospital and health science center complex.

In 1956, the Florida Legislature authorized the creation of a new state university to be located in Hillsborough County, Florida, and the Florida Board of Control appointed Allen as the first president of what would become the new University of South Florida (USF) on June 27, 1957. Allen was the only candidate considered for the position, and would lead the new university as its president from its inception in 1957 until his retirement in 1970.

I asked Dr. Allen, 'Can you tell me where I can get a camel and burnous?' Dr. Allen was a tall, frosty New England type of gentleman. He didn't think that was funny at all.

— Retired Professor Elton B. Smith, recalling a 1961 conversation with President John Allen about the dry, sandy and empty spaces of the University of South Florida's campus.

On August 1, 1957, the newly minted university president and his secretary Ann Strickland moved into a borrowed office in the Hillsborough County Courthouse and went to work. According to The Tampa Tribune, Allen brought with him a note pad, a box of pencils, an ashtray for visitors and "great hope." When Allen arrived in Tampa in 1957, the fledgling university did not have a name, physical plant, faculty or students. He and his newly assembled administrative team began to build a modern state university from scratch. With a grant from the Ford Foundation, Allen toured American universities, scouting modern academic facilities and curriculums for ideas to build a better university, and he began to recruit administrative staff and future faculty members. Allen's plans were ambitious; to open a completely new university in three years with 1,500 students and to expand to 10,000 within ten years thereafter. The Florida Legislature appropriated $1.2 million in 1957 and another $5 million in 1959, and construction of the first three buildings began in earnest on 1,694 acres (6.86 km^{2}) of largely empty sandy brush land located nine miles (14 km) north of downtown Tampa. Thereafter, the university expanded rapidly, the first undergraduate classes were held in the fall of 1960, and the first master's degree program began in 1964, and the first doctoral program in 1967. In 1965, USF expanded to a second campus on the bayfront in St. Petersburg, located on the site of the old Bayboro Maritime Base. In September 1960, there were 1,997 undergraduates enrolled at USF. Ten years later, when Allen retired, USF had over 14,000 undergraduate and graduate students. Notably, the Florida Legislature authorized the Allen administration's proposal to establish a new medical school in 1965—the second publicly supported medical school in the state—and the first USF medical students began their studies in 1971.

Under Allen's leadership, South Florida heralded itself as the "Harvard of the South", and emphasized academics to the exclusion of major college sports. Allen became known for his opposition to major college sports programs in favor of a more academically centered university environment. He received national media attention for his insistence that USF would not start a football team or other major intercollegiate sports programs, and would instead spend the funds saved on academic needs.

After his retirement from USF, Allen actively contributed to the planning for the state's next public university, the University of North Florida in Jacksonville, Florida.

== Legacy ==
When John Allen assumed his duties as the first president of the then-unnamed University of South Florida on August 1, 1957, the university had no students. By the beginning of the 2009–2010 academic year, over 47,000 undergraduate and graduate students were enrolled on the university's four campuses in Tampa, St. Petersburg, Sarasota and Lakeland. During the 2008–2009 academic year, USF graduated over 10,000 undergraduate, graduate and professional students in 228 degree programs. The university that Allen built "from the sandspurs up," as Governor LeRoy Collins had said, is now one of the ten largest single-campus universities in the United States and one of only three first-tier public research universities in Florida. In recognition of the fundamental role Allen played in the founding, expansion and ultimate success of USF, the Florida Board of Regents named the university's main administration complex the "John and Grace Allen Center" in honor of President Allen and university first lady Grace Allen, his wife. Allen's ultimate legacy was to be the first person to build a modern state university from scratch: "As a completely new and separate institution, the University of South Florida became the first new institution of its kind to be conceived, planned and built in the United States in the 20th Century."

Allen died at his home in Tampa on December 27, 1982; he was 75. He was survived by his wife of forty-nine years, Grace Allen; she died on December 16, 2007.

== See also ==
- History of Florida
- History of the University of Florida
- List of New York University alumni
- List of presidents of the University of South Florida
- List of University of Florida faculty and administrators
- List of University of Florida presidents
- List of University of Minnesota people
- State University System of Florida

== Bibliography ==
- Greenberg, Mark I., University of South Florida: The First Fifty Years, 1956-2006, University of South Florida, Tampa, Florida (2006).
- Pleasants, Julian M., Gator Tales: An Oral History of the University of Florida, University of Florida, Gainesville, Florida (2006). ISBN 0-8130-3054-4.
- Proctor, Samuel, & Wright Langley, Gator History: A Pictorial History of the University of Florida, South Star Publishing Company, Gainesville, Florida (1986). ISBN 0-938637-00-2.
- Van Ness, Carl, & Kevin McCarthy, Honoring the Past, Shaping the Future: The University of Florida, 1853–2003, University of Florida, Gainesville, Florida (2003).
