= John Lott Brown =

American psychologist, university administrator, and professor

3rd President of the University of South Florida
- In office 1978–1988
- Preceded by: M. Cecil Mackey
- Succeeded by: Francis Borkowski

Personal details
- Born: December 3, 1924 Philadelphia, Pennsylvania, US
- Died: January 16, 2011 (aged 86) Ohio, US
- Spouse: Catharine Hertfelder
- Education: Worcester Polytechnic Institute (bachelor's in electrical engineering); Temple University (master's in psychology), Columbia University(doctorate in psychology)
- Occupation: University Administrator

John Lott Brown (December 3, 1924 – January 16, 2011) was a university administrator and professor.

== Background ==
Brown enrolled at Worcester Polytechnic Institute through the V-12 Navy College Training Program, where he earned his bachelor's degree in electrical engineering. He joined navy, and served in navy reserves. He earned a master's in psychology at Temple University and worked for the Link Belt Co. Later, he earned a Ph.D. in psychology from Columbia University.

== Career ==
=== University positions ===
After getting his Ph.D. he went to work at the Johnsville Naval Air Development Center in Warminster, Pennsylvania.

His research there was related to early space flight, specifically human factors related to space flight. While there, he worked with some of the earliest astronauts studying physiological responses to acceleration and deacceleration. Later, he joined the faculty of the University of Pennsylvania full-time. There he conducted research in physiological psychology with an emphasis in vision research, including light and color vision. In 1964, he left Penn to accept a position as the Dean of the graduate school at Kansas State University. He later became the Vice President for Academic Affairs.

In 1969 he moved to the University of Rochester in Rochester, New York, to become the director of the Center for Visual Sciences. He became University of South Florida's (USF) president in 1978. During his tenure, USF established its Moffit Cancer Center, USF Psychiatry Center, and USF College of Public Health. During the next ten years USF added 38 degree programs and expanded to four satellite campuses. He resigned in 1988 and Francis Borkowski succeeded him. He then served as interim director of USF's Center of Microelectronics Research before serving interim president at Worcester Polytechnic Institute for nine months.

== Personal life ==
Brown met his wife, Catharine Hertfelder at Temple University. They had four children. His hobbies included reading detective novels and dancing.
