= Grover E. Murray =

American geologist, educator and writer

- Murray in 1967

11th President of Texas Tech University
- In office 1989–1996
- Preceded by: Robert C. Goodwin
- Succeeded by: M. Cecil Mackey

Personal details
- Born: October 26, 1916 Maiden, North Carolina, U.S.
- Died: May 22, 2003 (aged 86) Lubbock, Texas, U.S.
- Spouse(s): Nancy Setzer Murray (died: 1985); Sally Sowell Williams Murray
- Children: Martha Murray; Barbara Elizabeth Murray
- Education: University of North Carolina at Chapel Hill (B.S.); Louisiana State University (M.S., Ph.D.)
- Occupation: Geologist, teacher, researcher, petroleum consultant, writer, administrator

Grover Elmer Murray (October 26, 1916 – May 22, 2003) was an American geologist, educator, and writer.

== Early life ==
Grover Murray was born in Maiden, North Carolina. Shortly thereafter, his family moved to Newton where Murray attended public school. Upon graduation, he enrolled at the University of North Carolina at Chapel Hill and earned a degree in geology. He went on to Louisiana State University in Baton Rouge, Louisiana, where he received an M.S. in 1939 and a Ph.D. in 1942.

== Louisiana State University ==
Murray began his career as a geologist in the petroleum industry. In 1948, he became a professor at LSU. In 1963, Murray was promoted to vice president and Dean of Academic Affairs. Two years later, he became vice president for Academic Affairs for the entire Louisiana State University System.

== Texas Tech ==
On September 1, 1966, Murray departed Louisiana for Lubbock, Texas, where he had accepted the job as president of Texas Technological College. During his time there, which ended in 1976, the school expanded considerably. The law school and medical school were built and the International Center for Arid and Semi-Arid Land Studies was created. As a result, also during Murray's time, the name of the school was changed from Texas Technological College to Texas Tech University.

He was a member of the International Commission on the History of Geological Sciences since 1967.

== Later life ==
After retiring as the president of Texas Tech, Murray continued to teach a geology course. Further, he returned to geologic consulting. In 1996, he was awarded the William H. Twenhofel Medal, which is the highest award given by the Society for Sedimentary Geology. Also in 1996, Murray and his wife, Sally, created the Grover E. Murray Education Award. Funded by Murray, the AAPG Grover E. Murray Memorial Distinguished Educator Award is also named in his honor.
