= Boston and Maine 3713 =

Preserved B&M class P-4a steam locomotive

Boston and Maine No. 3713
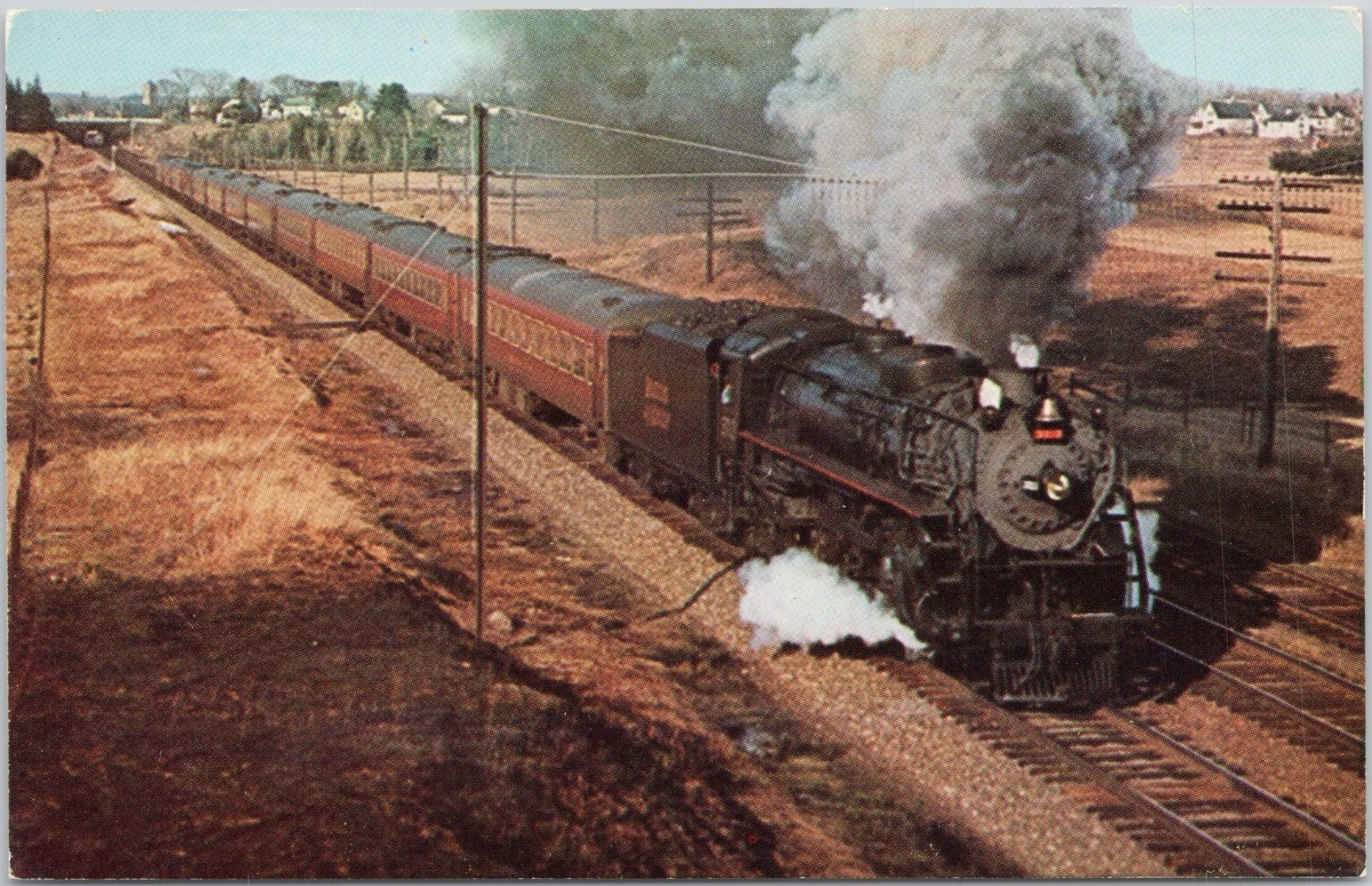
- No. 3713 pulling the last steam-powered passenger train on April 22, 1956.
Type and origin
- Power type: Steam
- Builder: Lima Locomotive Works
- Serial number: 7625
- Build date: December 1934
Specifications
- Configuration
  - Whyte: 4-6-2
  - UIC: 2′C1′ n2
- Gauge: 4 ft 8 1/2 in (1,435 mm)
- Driver dia.: 80 in (2,032.0 mm)
- Wheelbase: 77 ft 7 in (23.6 m)
- Adhesive weight: 209,500 lb (95,027.6 kilograms; 95.0 tonnes)
- Loco weight: 339,200 lb (153,858.5 kg; 153.9 t)
- Tender weight: 240,800 lb (109,225.0 kg; 109.2 t)
- Total weight: 580,000 lb (263,083.6 kg; 263.1 t)
- Fuel type: Coal
- Fuel capacity: 37,000 lb (16,782.9 kg; 16.8 t)
- Water cap.: 12,000 US gallons (45,000 L; 10,000 imp gal)
- Firebox
  - Grate area: 66.9 sq ft (6.22 m^{2})
- Boiler pressure: 260 psi (1.79 MPa)
- Feedwater heater: Coffin
- Heating surface
  - Firebox: 320 sq ft (30 m^{2})
  - Tubes and flues: 3,848 sq ft (357.5 m^{2})
  - Total surface: 4,814 sq ft (447.2 m^{2})
- Superheater
  - Heating area: 966 sq ft (89.7 m^{2})
- Cylinders: Two, outside
- Cylinder size: 23 in × 28 in (584 mm × 711 mm)
- Valve gear: Walschaerts
- Valve type: Piston valves
- Loco brake: Air
- Train brakes: Air
- Couplers: Knuckle
Performance figures
- Tractive effort: 40,918 lbf (182 kN); 52,800 lbf (235 kN) (w/ booster)
- Factor of adh.: 5.12
Career
- Operators: Boston and Maine Railroad
- Class: P-4a
- Numbers: B&M 3713
- Official name: The Constitution
- Locale: New England
- Delivered: December 21, 1934
- Last run: April 22, 1956
- Retired: July 1956
- Preserved: June 11, 1958
- Current owner: Steamtown National Historic Site
- Disposition: Undergoing slow restoration to operating condition

Boston and Maine 3713, also known as the "Constitution", is the sole survivor of the P-4a class 4-6-2 "Heavy Pacific" type steam locomotives. It was built in December 1934 by the Lima Locomotive Works for the Boston and Maine Railroad (B&M), hauling passenger trains around the New England region. In 1956, No. 3713 was given the duty to haul B&M's Steam Safari excursion from Boston, Massachusetts to Portland, Maine, and return.

Afterwards, the locomotive was purchased by New England millionaire F. Nelson Blount for his Steamtown, U.S.A. collection. After Blount died in 1967, No. 3713 was loaned to the Boston Museum of Science for static display. In 1985, No. 3713 was returned to Steamtown, which had moved to Scranton, Pennsylvania, one year prior.

When Steamtown was nationalized as Steamtown National Historic Site, work began in 1995 to restore No. 3713 to operating condition for use in pulling excursion trains. It was the focus of Project 3713, a partnership between the National Park Service and the Lackawanna & Wyoming Valley Railway Historical Society. As of 2026, restoration work on the No. 3713 locomotive is still ongoing.

== History ==
=== Design, namings, and revenue service ===
No. 3713 was the fourth member of five "P-4a" class heavy 4-6-2 Pacifics (Nos. 3710-3714) ordered by the Boston and Maine (B&M) in December 1934 at the Lima Locomotive Works (LLW) in Lima, Ohio, at a cost of $100,000. These locomotives were originally built with smoke deflectors, a single air compressor mounted on their pilot deck, and a metal sky-lining shroud covering up the top of their boiler thus giving them a semi-streamlined appearance. In 1936, the B&M ordered the final batch of five Pacifics (Nos. 3715-3719) which were delivered in March 1937 as the last Pacifics to be built by Lima. Slightly classified as P-4b, they were delivered with smoke deflectors but without the sky-lining shroud.

Designed with 80 in (2,032 mm) driving wheels, a larger firebox, and a massive boiler, the P-4 Heavy Pacifics would easily cruise at a speed of 70 miles per hour, carrying enough coal to pull a 14-car train for about 250 miles, and enough water to last about 125 miles. During World War II, all of the P-4s had their sky-lining shrouds and smoke deflectors removed for easier maintenance. Around 1944 or 1945, a second air compressor was added on all of the locomotives' pilot deck. They were assigned to haul B&M's high priority passenger trains such as the Minute Man, Alouette, Red Wing, and Flying Yankee all over the New England states.

The B&M sponsored the New England school students a contest to give all five P-4a and five other P-4b names. On December 11, 1937, No. 3713 was officially named The Constitution by J. Schumann Moore, a 14-year-old student from Eastern High School in Lynn, Massachusetts. Between 1940 and 1941, other winning names were selected to P-4a Pacifics No. 3710 as Peter Cooper, No. 3711 as Allagash, No. 3712 as East Wind, and No. 3714 as Greylock. While the P-4b Pacifics Nos. 3715 to 3719 were also named Kwasind, Rogers’ Rangers, Old North Bridge, Ye Salem Witch, and Camel’s Hump, respectively. Each locomotive all has a plaque representing the students' name and their respective educated school.

=== Retirement and preservation ===
After being withdrawn from passenger duties by newer diesel locomotives in the mid 1950s, No. 3713 became a stationary boiler to melt the snow and heat the passenger cars at the North Station terminal in Boston, Massachusetts. It was recalled to road service to cover for diesel locomotives during a flood, presumably in relation with the events of Hurricane Diane which affected the area at that time. (Note: During 1954, its original tender was replaced and paired with sister locomotive No. 3714's tender.) On April 22, 1956, No. 3713 ran the Steam Safari excursion round trip between Boston and Portland, Maine, and was officially retired from revenue service in July 1956.

On June 11, 1958, the No. 3713 locomotive was purchased by New England millionaire F. Nelson Blount as part of his Steamtown, U.S.A. collection at the Edaville Railroad in South Carver, Massachusetts, then Pleasure Island park in Wakefield, Massachusetts, before it was moved to North Walpole, New Hampshire in 1961, and finally Bellows Falls, Vermont in 1964. In October 1969, Steamtown put No. 3713 on a long-term loan to the Boston Museum of Science (MoS). The locomotive was moved to the B&M’s shops in Billerica, Massachusetts for a cosmetic restoration, and then it was put on static display outside the MoS’ building.

In February 1985, the MoS decided to end their lease with No. 3713, since they were looking into expanding their main building, and the locomotive was deemed too large to fit indoors. Multiple offers were made to purchase No. 3713 to keep it in Boston, but Steamtown opted to retain it and reunite it with their collection, which had relocated to Scranton, Pennsylvania the previous year. Steamtown considered restoring No. 3713 to operating condition, but at the time, they decided against it, since its running gear was found to be in poor condition.

=== Restoration ===
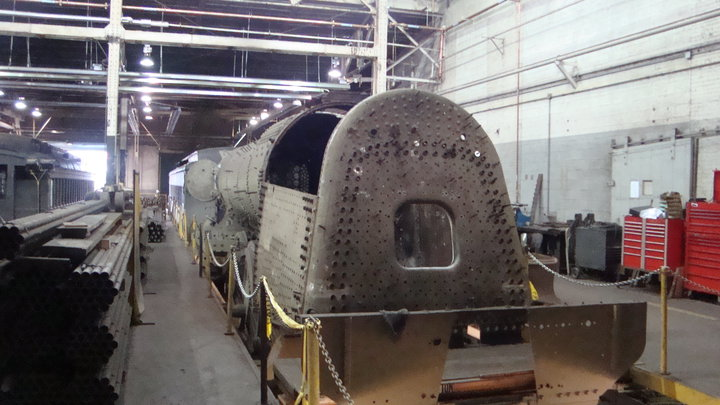
No. 3713's boiler under restoration on June 3, 2014

In 1995, shortly after the grand opening of Steamtown National Historic Site, Steamtown decided to restore an American-built mainline steam locomotive for excursion service via partnership with the Lackawanna and Wyoming Valley Railway Chapter (L&WVRHS) of the National Railway Historical Society (NRHS), and they narrowed down their options to evaluate either No. 3713 or Nickel Plate Road 759. Despite No. 759's better condition and greater pulling power, No. 3713 was chosen, due to its appeal as a rare surviving B&M locomotive, and it was disassembled while the Project3713 was launched. The estimated restoration work cost was $1.4 million, which required repairs to the boiler, air compressors, feedwater heater, and pilot truck. During 2011, the No. 3713 locomotive received new firebox grates, sheets, and thermic siphons, which were fabricated by Diversified Rail Services.

In October 2017, the driving wheels were sent to be repaired by the Strasburg Rail Road (SRC) in Strasburg, Pennsylvania for crankpin and axle work until they returned to Steamtown in spring 2019. In late August 2018, Steamtown gave SRC a $148,600 contract to build a brand new firebox for the No. 3713 locomotive. In October 2018, No. 3713 received three new safety valves, which were built by the SRC. In October 2019, the new firebox arrived at Steamtown and installed on the No. 3713 locomotive. In September 2023, Steamtown's formal partnership with L&WVRHS had ended, and the latter deposited the funds needed for No. 3713 into an account made specifically for the restoration. Once restored to operating condition, No. 3713 will eventually become the replacement for both Canadian National 3254 and Canadian Pacific 2317.

== See also ==
- Baldwin Locomotive Works 26
- Canadian Pacific 2317
- Nickel Plate Road 759

== Bibliography ==
- Drury, George H. (2015). Guide to North American Steam Locomotives (2nd ed.). Kalmbach Media. ISBN 978-1-62700-259-2.
- Heald, Bruce D. (2001). Boston and Maine in the 20th Century. Images of Rail (1st ed.). Arcadia Publishing. ISBN 0-7385-0547-1.
- McLaughlin, Robert (2009). Pleasure Island. Images of America (1st ed.). Arcadia Publishing. ISBN 978-0-7385-6460-9.
