= Nickel Plate Road 759 =

Preserved NKP S-2 class 2-8-4 locomotive

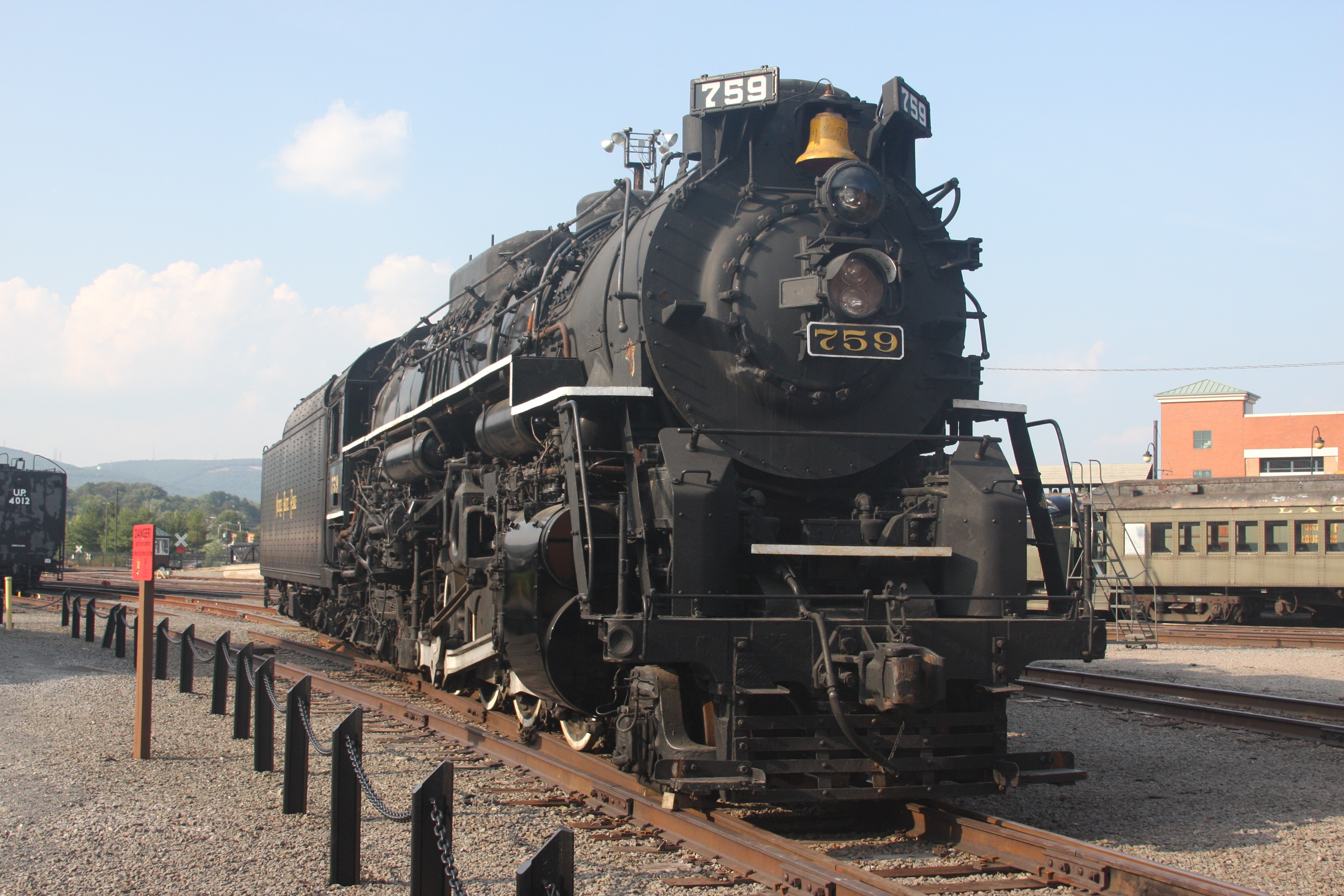
- NKP No. 759 on static display at Steamtown National Historic Site in September 2015
Type and origin
- Power type: Steam
- Builder: Lima Locomotive Works
- Serial number: 8667
- Model: S-2
- Build date: August 1944
Specifications
- Configuration
  - Whyte: 2-8-4
  - UIC: 1′D2′
- Gauge: 4 ft 8 1/2 in (1,435 mm)
- Leading dia.: 36 in (0.914 m)
- Driver dia.: 69 in (1,753 mm)
- Trailing dia.: 43 in (1.092 m)
- Length: 100 ft 8 3/4 in (30.70 m)
- Height: 15 ft 8 in (4.78 m)
- Adhesive weight: 264,300 lb (119,884.46 kg)
- Loco weight: 440,800 lb (199,943.52 kg)
- Total weight: 802,500 lb (364,000 kg; 364.0 t)
- Fuel type: Coal
- Fuel capacity: 22 long tons (22 t)
- Water cap.: 22,000 imp gal (100,000 L; 26,000 US gal)
- Boiler pressure: 245 lbf/in^{2} (1.69 MPa)
- Cylinders: Two, outside
- Cylinder size: 25 in × 34 in (635 mm × 864 mm)
- Valve gear: Baker
- Valve type: Piston valves
- Loco brake: Air
- Train brakes: Air
- Couplers: Knuckle
Performance figures
- Maximum speed: 70 mph (110 km/h)
- Tractive effort: 64,100 lbf (285.13 kN)
- Factor of adh.: 4.12
Career
- Operators: New York, Chicago & St. Louis; Steamtown, U.S.A.; High Iron Company
- Class: S-2
- Numbers: NKP 759; N&W 759
- Locale: Midwest
- Delivered: September 1944
- Last run: 1958 (revenue service); 1973 (excursion service)
- Retired: 1959 (revenue service); 1977 (excursion service)
- Preserved: October 16, 1962
- Restored: 1967
- Current owner: Steamtown National Historic Site
- Disposition: On static display

Nickel Plate Road 759 is a preserved S-2 class 2-8-4 "Berkshire" type steam locomotive built in August 1944 by the Lima Locomotive Works (LLW) in Lima, Ohio as a member of the S-2 class for the New York, Chicago & St. Louis Railroad, commonly referred to as the Nickel Plate Road (NKP). Built as a fast freight locomotive, No. 759 served the NKP until being retired in 1959 and placed into storage.

In 1965, No. 759 was purchased by F. Nelson Blount for display in his Steamtown, U.S.A. collection in North Walpole, New Hampshire. The locomotive was restored to operating condition in 1967 by New York commodity broker Ross Rowland for use in hauling his Golden Spike Centennial Limited, a special commemorative train that celebrated the 100th anniversary of the completion of the Transcontinental Railroad in 1969. Afterwards, No. 759 pulled numerous excursions for Ross Rowland and Steamtown until being retired once more and placed back on display in 1977. As of 2025, the locomotive remains on static display at the Steamtown National Historic Site (NHS) in Scranton, Pennsylvania, and sibling engine No. 765 continues to operate in mainline excursion service.

== History ==
=== Revenue service and preservation ===
No. 759 was built in August 1944 by the Lima Locomotive Works (LLW) in Lima, Ohio for the New York, Chicago & St. Louis Railroad, better known as the Nickel Plate Road (NKP). No. 759 was one of 80 2-8-4 Berkshire type steam locomotives built for the NKP between 1934 and 1949 for fast freight duties. The Nickel Plate had 4 sub-classes of 2-8-4s corresponding to which order the locomotive was in, these were designated S through S-3, No. 759, is a member of the third order of 2-8-4s, classified S-2.

Much of No. 759's original career on the Nickel Plate is obscure at best, but it is known that in May 1958, No. 759 entered the Nickel Plate's Conneaut, Ohio shops for a complete overhaul which turned out to be the last overhaul of a steam locomotive on the Nickel Plate. After the overhaul was completed, No. 759 was never fired up and instead was put into storage.

No. 759 was purchased by steam locomotive enthusiast, F. Nelson Blount on October 16, 1962 and subsequently moved to his Steamtown, U.S.A. collection in North Walpole, New Hampshire. It was later moved across the Connecticut River to Bellows Falls, Vermont.

=== Excursion service ===
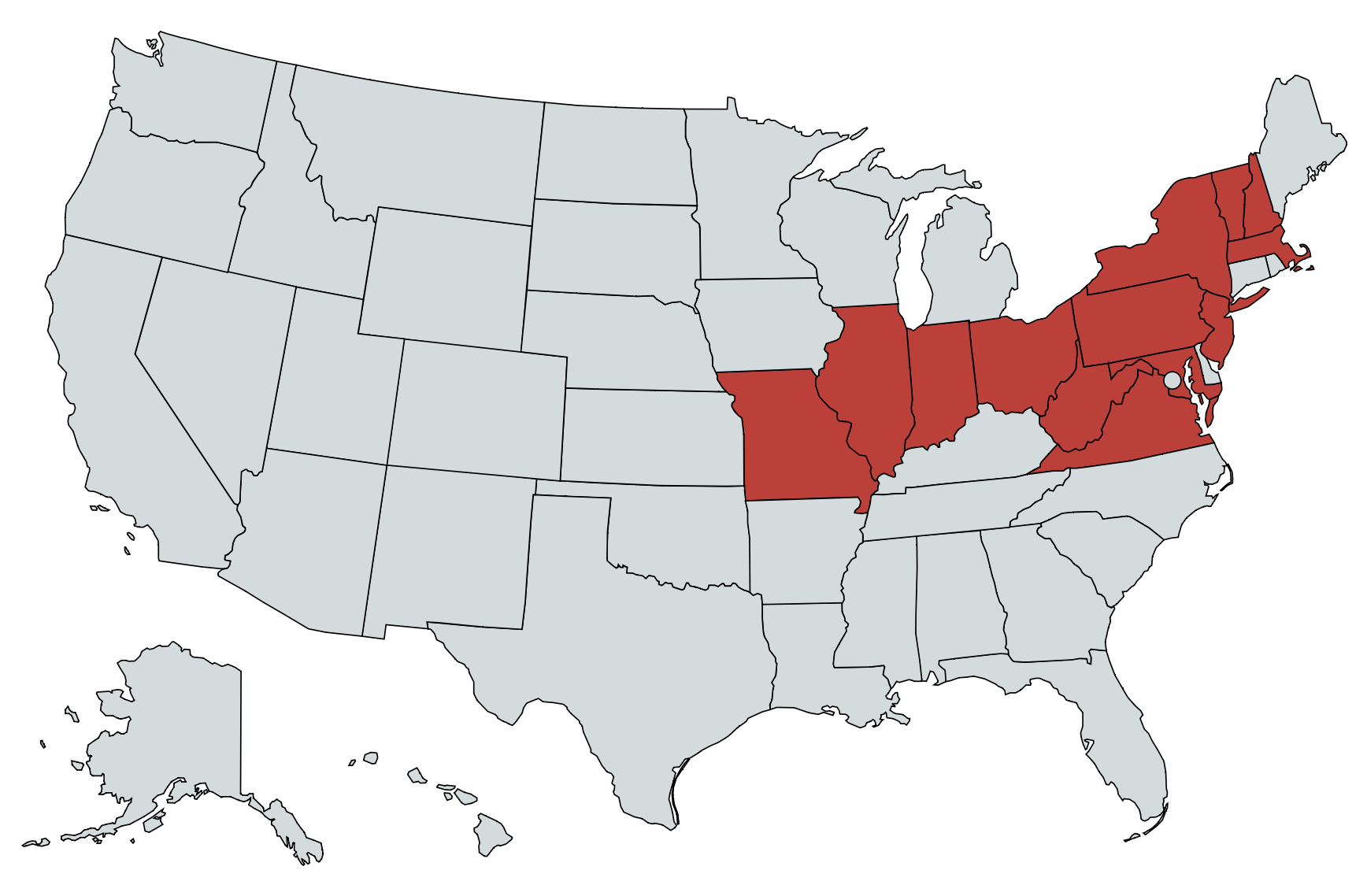
US states visited by No. 759 in excursion service

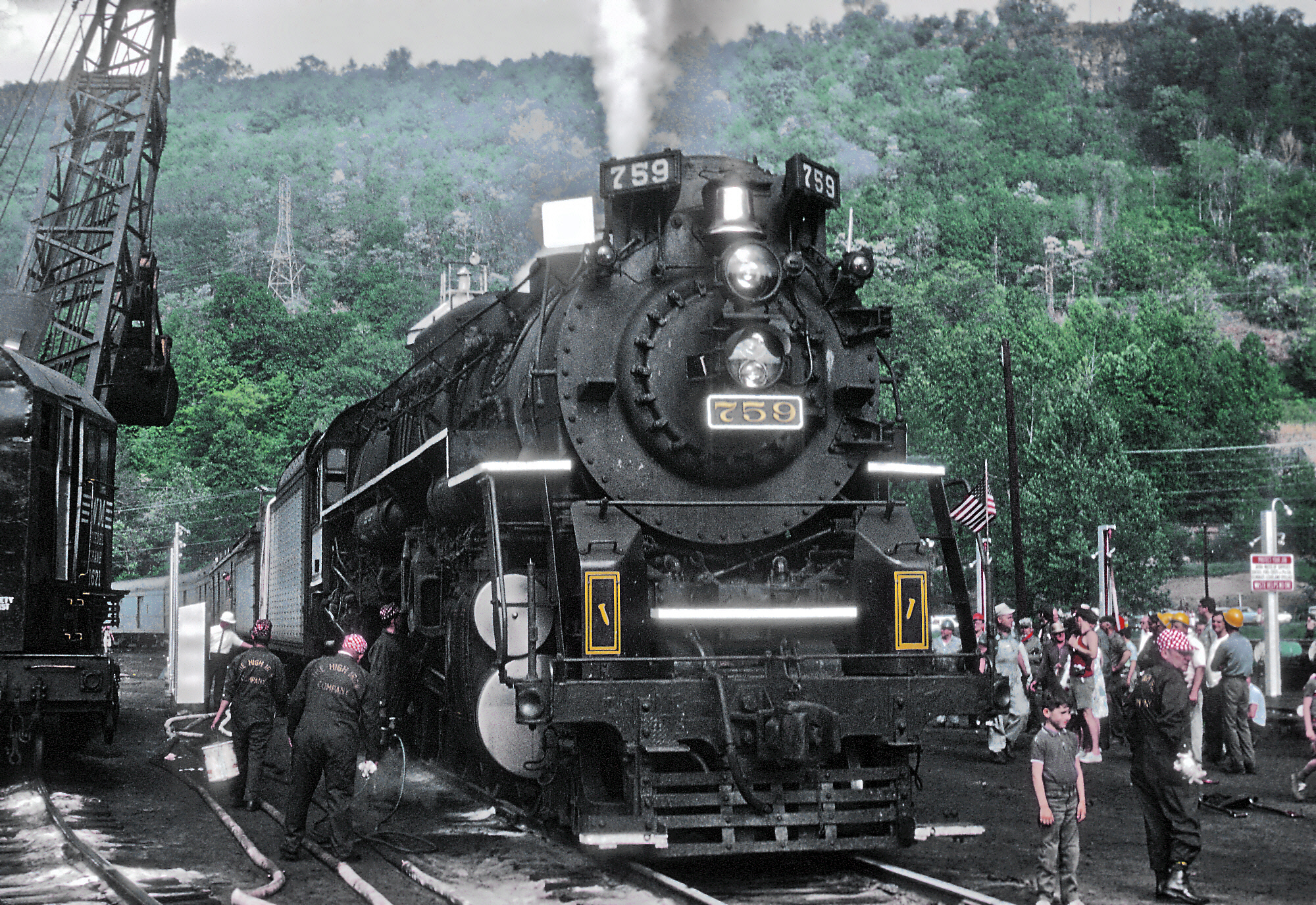
No. 759 in Cumberland, Maryland, while pulling the Golden Spike Centennial Limited on May 17, 1969

In 1967, a commodities broker from New York named Ross E. Rowland made a deal that would return No. 759 to service for steam powered fan trips hosted by Rowland's High Iron Company (HICO). No. 759 was chosen for restoration, since Rowland had previously operated Canadian Pacific 4-6-2 locomotives 1238, 1286, and another one of Blount's locomotives, 1278, and they didn't meet enough expectations to pull his longer excursion trains, unassisted. No. 759 was taken to the Norfolk and Western Railroad's former Nickel Plate roundhouse in Conneaut, Ohio, the same place No. 759 was last serviced. After a short restoration and subsequent testing, No. 759 pulled its first excursion for the High Iron Company on August 30, 1968 when she pulled a 15 car excursion to Buffalo, New York.

In 1969, No. 759 was painted blue and gold for a special train celebrating the 100th anniversary of the driving of the golden spike. This train, dubbed the Golden Spike Centennial Limited, took No. 759 as far away as Kansas City, Missouri, where Union Pacific 8444 would take over. After returning home from the Golden Spike Centennial Limited, No. 759 was returned to her Nickel Plate Road livery and ran two excursions for Steamtown, one of which was to Scranton, Pennsylvania, Steamtown's future home. In 1970, this engine pulled a "High Iron" excursion from Hoboken to Binghamton, over the Erie Lackawanna main line, stayed over night in Binghamton, and then it returned to Hoboken. In September of that year, No. 759 pulled an excursion on the Western Maryland (WM) mainline between Cumberland and Haegerstown, Maryland.

On May 1, 1971, the day Amtrak began operations, No. 759 was given the duty to haul the final run of Norfolk and Western's (N&W) Pocahontas passenger train from Roanoke to Norfolk, Virginia. It was repainted in a shiny black paint with "NORFOLK AND WESTERN" letterings plastered on to its tender. Additionally, it wore a Hancock long-bell 3-chime whistle, which came from the streamlined N&W class J 4-8-4 steam locomotive No. 611.

After a few excursions over the Boston and Maine and Central Vermont in late 1973, No. 759 was placed into storage at the Delaware and Hudson's roundhouse in Rouses Point, New York for the winter. While it was in storage, D&H employees had neglected to completely drain the 759's boiler and left water in it which froze causing a considerable amount of damage to No. 759's boiler tubes. As a result, Steamtown sued the D&H for the damage it caused to the locomotive and won. As a settlement for the damage, the D&H had some repairs made to No. 759, and after some follow-up work back at Steamtown, No. 759 was test fired in 1975. In 1977 some more repairs were made to get No. 759 legally operational, but after a boiler flue failed during a hydrostatic test, it was decided that No. 759 would remain a static display piece.

=== Static display ===
In 1984, No. 759 was relocated with the rest of the Steamtown collection from Bellows Falls to Scranton, Pennsylvania, and No. 759 was then placed on display in the former Delaware, Lackawanna and Western (DLW) rail yard. In 1988, Steamtown and most of its collection became part of the newly-formed Steamtown National Historic Site (NHS). No. 759 remained on display at Steamtown, more often than not being on display inside the refurbished DL&W roundhouse. No. 759 would be easily seen from the walkway Steamtown put inside the roundhouse to allow visitors to see the work going on. It is also the largest locomotive in the roundhouse with only a foot or two of clearance at either end making it notoriously difficult if not impossible to get a photo of the whole locomotive (in order for 759 to fit, all of the safety railings that surround the turntable pit in the areas open to visitors would have to be removed).

In 1995, during Steamtown NHS' formal grand opening, Steamtown considered restoring No. 759 to operating condition via partnership with the Lackawanna and Wyoming Valley Railway Chapter (L&WVRHS) of the National Railway Historical Society (NRHS), since it was still in good condition and had great pulling power, but Boston and Maine 3713 was voted for restoration instead, due to its appeal as a rare surviving B&M locomotive.

In 2010, No. 759 was among the several steam locomotives in Steamtown's collection to undergo removal of its asbestos insulation. Asbestos was used by railroads and locomotive manufacturers as boiler insulation. In addition to having the asbestos removed, 759 had all new jacketing applied as well as its bell re-installed, which had been in storage.

While it is possible to restore No. 759 to operational condition, Steamtown has no plans to restore the locomotive, and another Nickel Plate Road 2-8-4, No. 765, is already operational; the latter has briefly visited Steamtown for Railfest 2015 to pose side by side with 759. As of 2026, No. 759 sits safely on display out of the elements in Steamtown's roundhouse.

== See also ==
- Nickel Plate Road 757
- Nickel Plate Road 763
- Nickel Plate Road 765
- Nickel Plate Road 779

== Bibliography ==
- Warden, William E.; Miller, Kenneth L. (2000). Norfolk and Western Passenger Service: 1946–1971 (2nd ed.). TLC Publishing. ISBN 1-883089-50-6.
