= Nickel Plate Road 757 =

Preserved Nickel Plate Road steam locomotive

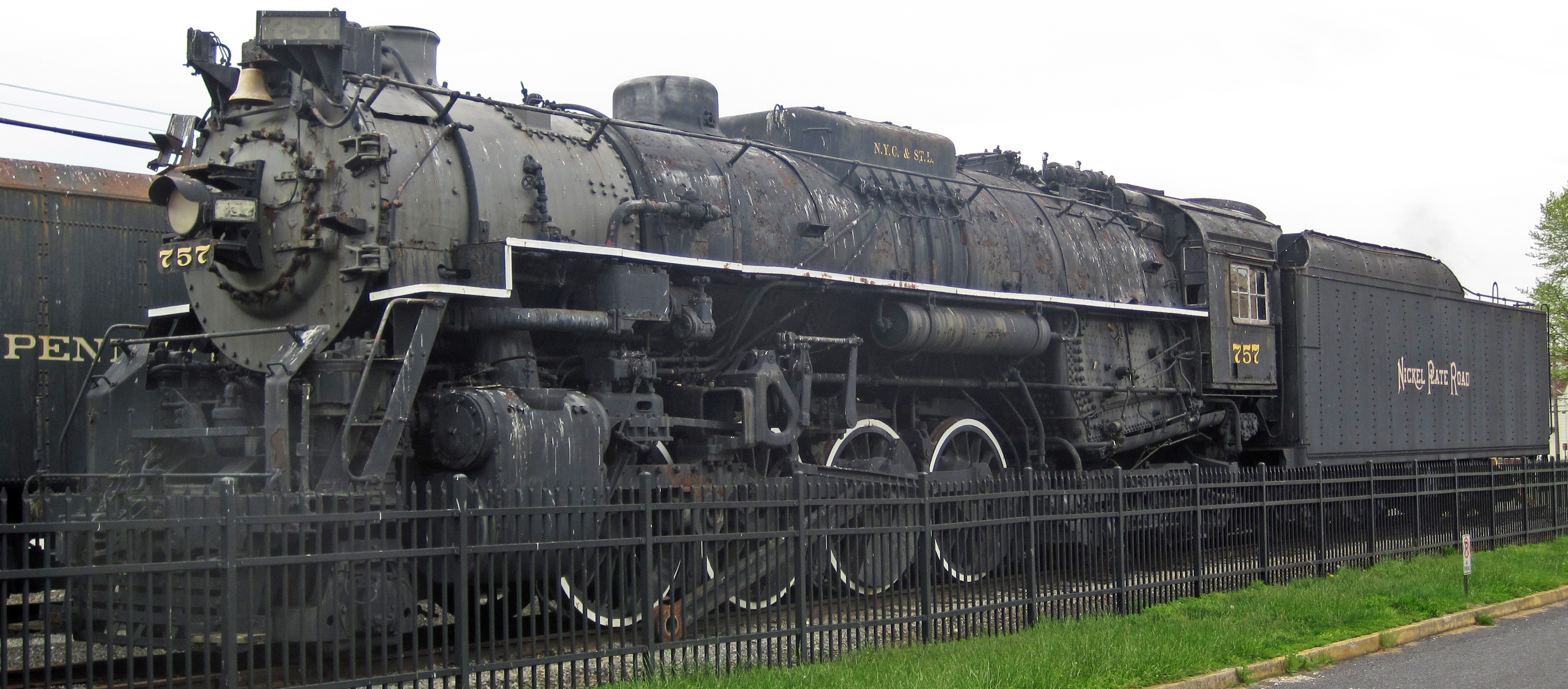
- Nickel Plate Road No. 757 on display at the Railroad Museum of Pennsylvania in 2016
Type and origin
- Power type: Steam
- Builder: Lima Locomotive Works
- Serial number: 8665
- Build date: August 18, 1944
Specifications
- Configuration
  - Whyte: 2-8-4
  - UIC: 1'D2'h
- Gauge: 4 ft 8 1/2 in (1,435 mm) standard gauge
- Leading dia.: 36 in (0.914 m)
- Driver dia.: 69 in (1.753 m)
- Trailing dia.: 43 in (1.092 m)
- Length: 100 ft 8 3/4 in (30.70 m)
- Height: 15 ft 8 in (4.78 m)
- Adhesive weight: 264,300 lb (119,900 kg; 119.9 t)
- Loco weight: 440,800 lb (199,900 kg; 199.9 t)
- Total weight: 802,500 lb (364,000 kg; 364.0 t)
- Fuel type: Coal
- Fuel capacity: 44,000 lb (20,000 kg; 20 t) 22 short tons (20.0 t; 19.6 long tons)
- Water cap.: 22,000 US gal (83,000 L; 18,000 imp gal)
- Boiler: 89.0625 in (2.26 m) diameter × 42 ft (12.80 m) length
- Boiler pressure: 245 psi (1.69 MPa)
- Superheater: Elesco
- Cylinders: Two, outside
- Cylinder size: 25 in × 34 in (635 mm × 864 mm)
- Valve gear: Baker
- Valve type: Piston valves
- Loco brake: Air
- Train brakes: Air
- Couplers: Knuckle
Performance figures
- Maximum speed: 80 mph (129 km/h)
- Power output: 4,500 hp (3,400 kW)
- Tractive effort: 64,135 lbf (285.3 kN)
- Factor of adh.: 4.12
Career
- Operators: Nickel Plate Road
- Class: S-2
- Number in class: 11
- Numbers: NKP 757
- Retired: June 15, 1958
- Preserved: 1960
- Current owner: Mad River & NKP Railroad Museum
- Disposition: Undergoing cosmetic restoration

Nickel Plate Road 757 is a S-2 class 2-8-4 "Berkshire" type steam locomotive, built in August 1944 by the Lima Locomotive Works (LLW) in Lima, Ohio for the Chicago & St. Louis Railroad, commonly referred to as the "Nickel Plate Road".

== History ==
Nickel Plate Road 757 was built on August 18, 1944, by the Lima Locomotive Works in Lima, Ohio and it arrived on the Nickel Plate Road that same year in 1944.

It was one of 30 class S-2 steam locomotives built for high-speed freight service on the New York, Chicago & St. Louis Railroad, also known as the Nickel Plate Road (NKP).

The locomotive made its last run in revenue service on June 15, 1958 and was retired from the NKP. In 1960, it was donated to the city of Bellevue, Ohio, who were unable to raise funds to build a display site for No. 757 and instead sent the locomotive to the Railroad Museum of Pennsylvania in Strasburg, Pennsylvania during 1966.

In 2017, it was announced that No. 757 would be returning home to Bellevue, Ohio where it would receive a cosmetic restoration by the Mad River & NKP Railroad Museum and placed on display at their property.

On February 11, 2019, No. 757 left the Railroad Museum of Pennsylvania and travel over 500 miles to its new home. It arrived at the Mad River & NKP Railroad Museum's property on February 14 and is now being cosmetically restored by museum, it will eventually be placed on station display when restoration is finished.

In September 2021, No. 757 was reunited with its operational sister locomotive No. 765 for the Berkshires in Bellevue event.

== See also ==
- Nickel Plate Road 759
- Nickel Plate Road 763
- Nickel Plate Road 765
- Nickel Plate Road 779
