= Nickel Plate Road 765 =

Preserved NKP S-2 class 2-8-4 locomotive

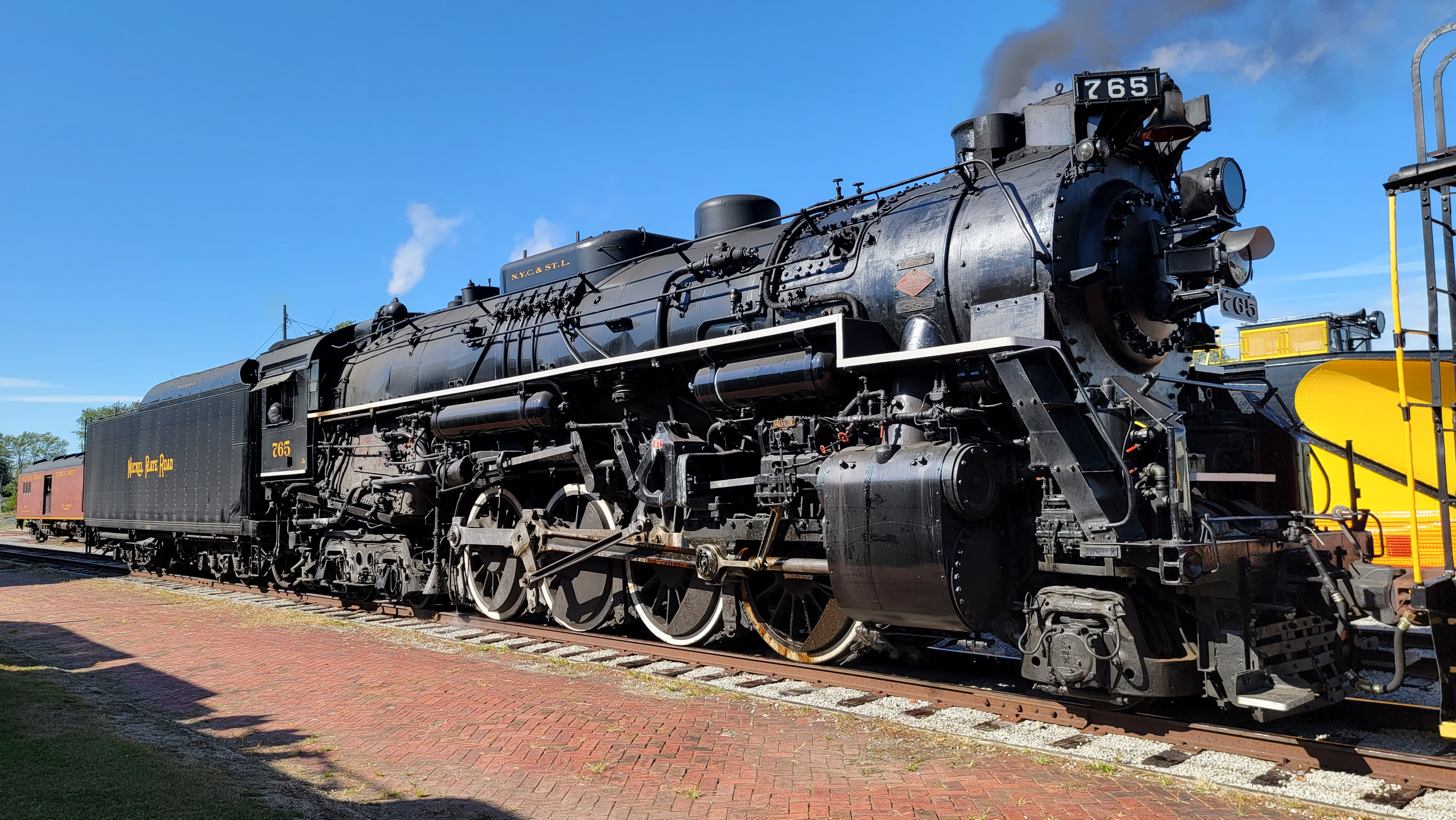
- No. 765 at the Mad River & NKP Railroad Museum in Bellevue, Ohio, during September 2021
Type and origin
- Power type: Steam
- Builder: Lima Locomotive Works
- Serial number: 8673
- Build date: September 8, 1944
Specifications
- Configuration
  - Whyte: 2-8-4
  - UIC: 1'D2'h
- Gauge: 4 ft 8 1/2 in (1,435 mm) standard gauge
- Leading dia.: 36 in (0.914 m)
- Driver dia.: 69 in (1.753 m)
- Trailing dia.: 43 in (1.092 m)
- Length: 100 ft 8 3/4 in (30.70 m)
- Height: 15 ft 8 in (4.78 m)
- Adhesive weight: 264,300 lb (119,900 kg; 119.9 t)
- Loco weight: 440,800 lb (199,900 kg; 199.9 t)
- Total weight: 802,500 lb (364,000 kg; 364.0 t)
- Fuel type: Coal
- Fuel capacity: 44,000 lb (20,000 kg; 20 t) 22 short tons (20.0 t; 19.6 long tons)
- Water cap.: 22,000 US gal (83,000 L; 18,000 imp gal)
- Boiler: 89.0625 in (2.26 m) diameter × 42 ft (12.80 m) length
- Boiler pressure: 245 psi (1.69 MPa)
- Superheater: Elesco
- Cylinders: Two, outside
- Cylinder size: 25 in × 34 in (635 mm × 864 mm)
- Valve gear: Baker
- Valve type: Piston valves
- Loco brake: Air
- Train brakes: Air
- Couplers: Knuckle
Performance figures
- Maximum speed: 81 mph (130 km/h)
- Power output: 4,500 hp (3,400 kW)
- Tractive effort: 64,135 lbf (285.3 kN)
- Factor of adh.: 4.12
Career
- Operators: Nickel Plate Road; Norfolk and Western Railway; Norfolk Southern Railway; Cuyahoga Valley Scenic Railroad (leased); Indiana Northeastern Railroad (leased); Fort Wayne Railroad Historical Society
- Class: S-2
- Number in class: 11
- Numbers: NKP 765; NKP 767; NYC 765; C&O 2765; NKP 828
- Delivered: September 1944
- Retired: June 14, 1958
- Preserved: May 4, 1963
- Restored: September 1, 1979
- Current owner: Fort Wayne Railroad Historical Society
- Disposition: Operational
- New York Chicago and St. Louis Railroad Steam Locomotive No. 765
- U.S. National Register of Historic Places
- Location within Indiana Location within the United States
- Location: 15808 Edgerton Rd., New Haven, Indiana
- Coordinates: 41°5′16″N 84°56′14″W
- Area: less than one acre
- Architectural style: S-2 class locomotive
- NRHP reference No.: 96001010
- Added to NRHP: September 12, 1996

Nickel Plate Road 765 is a preserved S-2 class 2-8-4 "Berkshire" type steam locomotive, built in September 1944 by the Lima Locomotive Works (LLW) for the New York, Chicago & St. Louis Railroad, commonly referred to as the "Nickel Plate Road". In 1963, No. 765, renumbered as 767, was donated to the city of Fort Wayne, Indiana, where it sat on display at the Lawton Park, while the real No. 767 was scrapped at Chicago in 1964.

In the early 1970s, the newly formed Fort Wayne Railroad Historical Society (FWRHS) restored No. 765 and operated it in main line excursion service. During the 1980s to early 90s, No. 765 ran excursion trains on the ex-Southern Railway's CNO&TP division and ex-Chesapeake and Ohio's New River Gorge route. Taken out of service in 1993, No. 765 was added to the National Register of Historic Places on September 12, 1996.

The locomotive was completely overhauled and returned to service in 2005. Since 2010, it visited the Cuyahoga Valley Scenic Railroad (CVSR), hauling several excursions every year. From 2012 to 2015, No. 765 ran excursions on Norfolk Southern (NS) trackage in Indiana, Missouri, New York, Ohio, Pennsylvania, and West Virginia, for the 21st Century Steam program. In 2016, it ran excursions on Metra's Milwaukee District North Line and even the Rock Island District Line in 2017 and 2018. Since 2022, it has operated on the Indiana Northeastern Railroad (IN) for the seasonal Indiana Rail Experience excursions.

== History ==
=== Background ===
At the turn of the 20th century, railroads faced a surmounting problem: an increase in traffic and limited steam technology. Railroads commonly relied on drag freights with engines that could pull heavy tonnage but at low speeds. Following experiments with existing designs, Lima Locomotive Works developed a new wheel arrangement to accommodate an increase in the size of the locomotive's firebox. An increase in the firebox size allowed more coal combustion and subsequent heat output, improving the amount of steam developed and increasing horsepower. These and other modifications created the concept of "horsepower at speed" or "Super-power" in Lima's parlance.

In 1925, this "Super-power" technology was successfully realized in a prototype designated the A-1, which was tested in the Berkshire Mountains of the Boston & Albany Railroad, hence the common name of the locomotive type. The 2-8-4 design was quickly adopted by the New York Central, Erie Railroad, Illinois Central, Pere Marquette, Boston & Maine, Chesapeake & Ohio, and the Nickel Plate Road.

The Nickel Plate Road was able to eventually employ 80 Berkshires on high-speed freight and passenger trains with the first order (designated S Class) 15 were supplied by the American Locomotive Company in 1934 based on Lima's design. Eight years later, Lima began producing three more sub-classes, which differed from the S class in little more than weight. Class S-1 (715–739) in 1942, class S-2 (740–769) in 1944 and class S-3 (770–779) in 1949. As a group, these engines were referred to as the "Seven Hundreds."

An additional number of Berkshires (S-4 class) were acquired when the Nickel Plate Road leased the Wheeling and Lake Erie Railroad in 1949. As a direct result of the Berkshire class, the railroad earned a reputation for high-speed service, which later became its motto.

No. 765's construction was completed on September 8, 1944.

=== Revenue service ===
No. 765 was first assigned to Bellevue, Ohio, where it was used primarily on Nickel Plate Road's fast freight trains. After World War II, the locomotive worked primarily out of a classification yard in the east side of Fort Wayne, Indiana.

Its final revenue run came on June 14, 1958, but was activated one final time to supply steam heat to a stranded passenger train that December, becoming the last Nickel Plate Road Berkshire under steam.

As evidence of their reputation, Fort Wayne's The News-Sentinel in a June 7 article remarked:

the Nickel Plate's massive Berkshires – steam engines that look like an engine should – have always been the special pets of Fort Wayne and area rail buffs. But not for long. The famed Berkshires carved an enviable record in railroad history and were the most colorful engines in this part of the country. On the Nickel Plate they were just as economical as diesel power, but the Berkshires are giving up in the inevitable face of progress.

=== Retirement ===
Though the Berkshires had competed with encroaching diesel-electric technology, they were largely retired by 1958 and kept in serviceable condition by the Nickel Plate Road. With the traffic reduction and the acquisition of new diesel locomotives, the steam locomotives were retired to be stored outdoors and scrapped by 1964. Because of No. 765's excellent mechanical condition and favorable reputation among local crews, the Nickel Plate Road maintained the locomotive indoors until 1961.

In a move to honor the success of Fort Wayne's "Elevate the Nickel Plate" project, the city requested S-2 No. 767 for display in Lawton Park in recognition of it being the first ceremonial train to open the overpass. However, the No. 767 locomotive was discovered to be in deteriorated condition and was scrapped. So the Nickel Plate Road instead donated the No. 765 locomotive, now renumbered as No. 767, to the city on May 4, 1963, for display at 4th and Clinton Streets. A plaque commemorating the occasion read: "Nickel Plate Road Berkshire No. 767, used to break ribbon at dedication of track elevation on October 4th, 1955, donated by the New York, Chicago, and St. Louis Railroad company to the City of Fort Wayne as a monument to a great period in the development of our country – the era of steam railroading."

=== Restoration ===
In September 1971 at the annual convention of the Nickel Plate Historical & Technical Society, Wayne York, Glenn Brendel and Walter Sassmannshausen, Jr. met to discuss forming a group to cosmetically restore former Nickel Plate no. 765/767 and Wabash No. 534, another locomotive that had been installed for display in Swinney Park in 1957.

By November 1972, York, Brendel, Sassmannshausen, and John Eichman signed incorporation papers for the Fort Wayne Railroad Historical Society, Inc. By 1973, the Fort Wayne Railroad Historical Society undertook a 25-year lease of 765/767 and in 1974 moved No. 765 to New Haven, Indiana to begin what was now a restoration to operation. In October 1975, No. 765 was returned to having its original number and the Fort Wayne Railroad Historical Society held a press conference announcing their intentions to restore the locomotive to operating condition.

From 1975 to 1979, No. 765 was restored to operating condition at the Fort Wayne Railroad Historical Society located within the former Casad Military depot in New Haven. The restoration site lacked conventional shop facilities and protection from the elements, but on September 1, 1979, No. 765 made its first move under its own power in 21 years.

Later that winter, No. 765 ran under its own power to Bellevue and Sandusky, Ohio for heated, indoor winter storage. It became the first mainline steam locomotive to be restored and operated by an all volunteer non-profit organization.

=== First excursion service ===
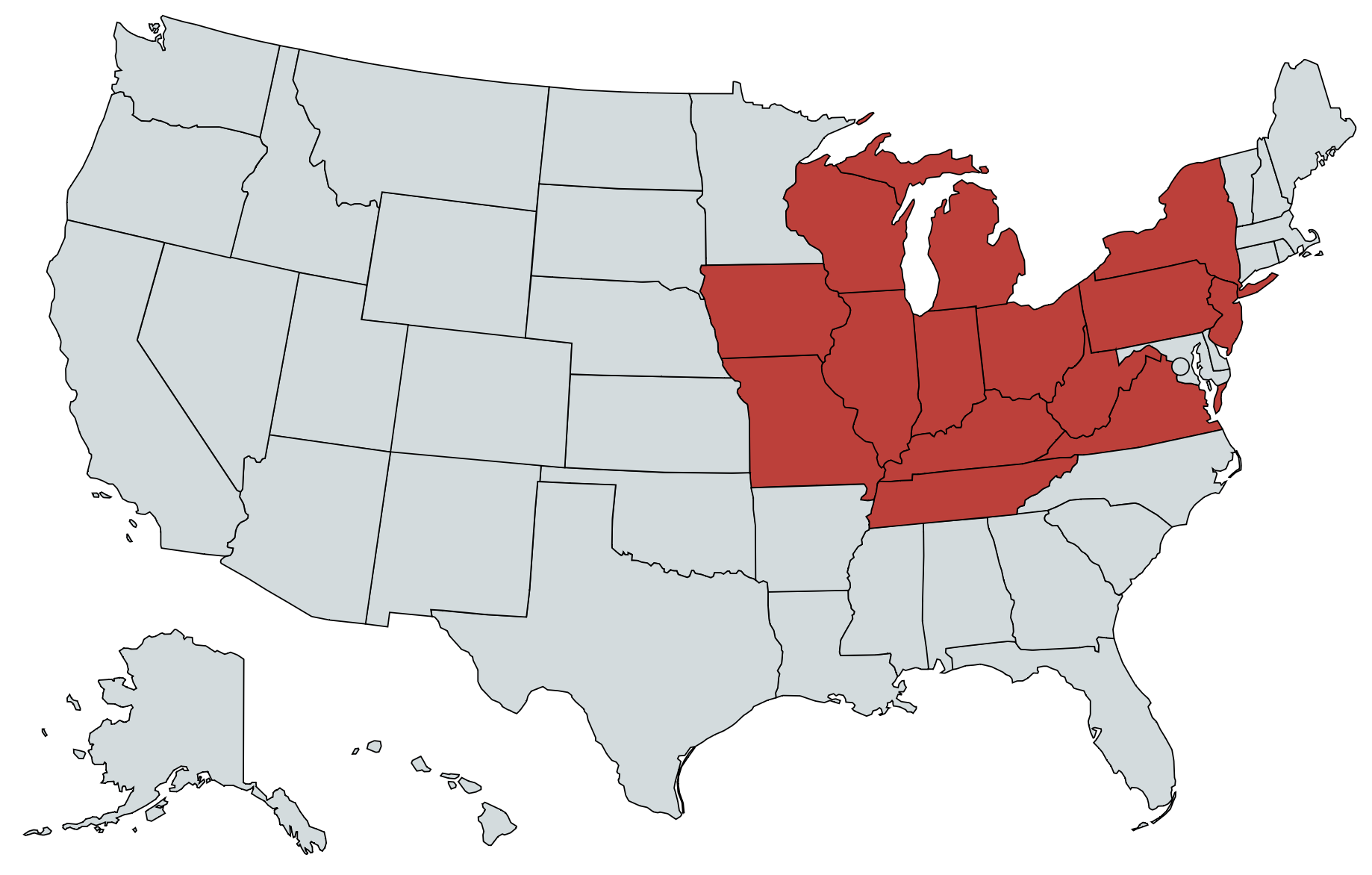
US states visited by No. 765 in excursion service

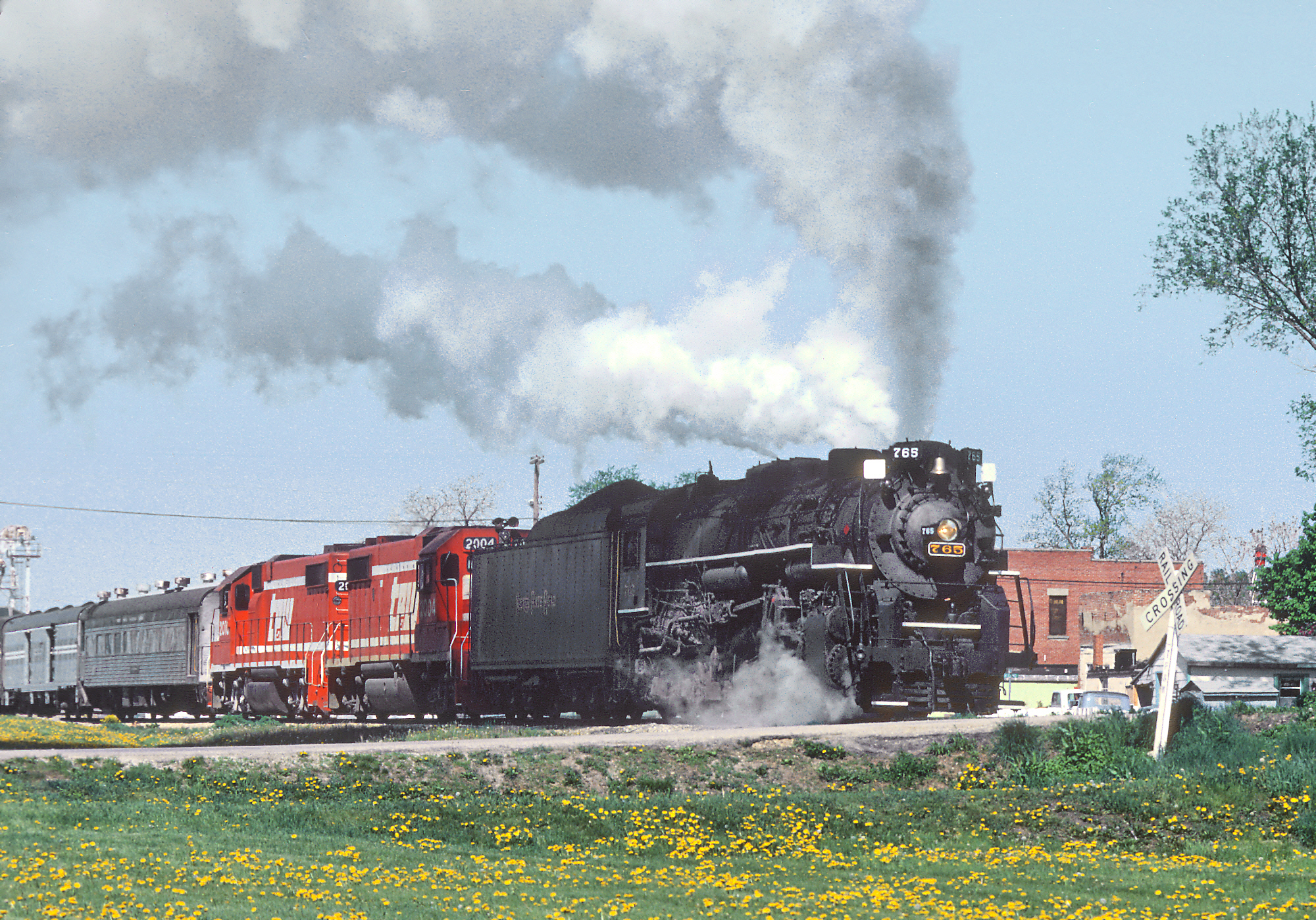
No. 765 passing through Secor, Illinois, on its inaugural excursion run in May 1980

The popularity of restoring and operating steam locomotives on the general railroad system as marketing tools increased with Class 1 and regional railroads in the decades after steam was retired. Throughout May 1980, No. 765 visited the Toledo, Peoria and Western Railway (TP&W) in Peoria, Illinois, where it hauled its inaugural excursion trains and assisted some freight trains, at the approval of then TP&W president Robert McMillan. Two months later, on July 12–13, No. 765 hauled some excursions over the Norfolk and Western (N&W)—which had absorbed the NKP in 1964—between Fort Wayne and Argos, Indiana. On July 28, No. 765 hauled a segment of the long-distance Independence Limited excursion, hosted by the National Railway Historical Society's (NRHS) Roanoke Chapter, over the N&W from Bellevue, Ohio to Muncie, Indiana.

In 1982, shortly after the N&W's merger with the Southern Railway (SOU) to form Norfolk Southern (NS), No. 765 was leased to haul a series of excursions for the former SOU steam excursion program, after Chesapeake and Ohio 2716, another 2-8-4 steam locomotive, suffered some firebox issues. The successful No. 765-led excursions would pave the way for Norfolk Southern to continue the steam program with larger ex-N&W locomotive No. 611, and later, No. 1218.

In the 1980s, No. 765 appeared in the movies Four Friends and Matewan and became an annual attraction in the New River Gorge operating the New River Trains from 1985 to 1988 and again from 1990 to 1993. These trips regularly saw No. 765 with close to and sometimes over 30 passenger cars traveling a 300-mile (480 km) round-trip during peak fall color season, with passengers from around the world. In 1985, the Fort Wayne Railroad Historical Society obtained ownership of 765.

In August 1991, 765 was paired with the recently restored Pere Marquette No. 1225 for that year's NRHS convention in Huntington, West Virginia. No. 765 ran side-by-side with No. 1225 while pulling 25 CSX hopper cars on the CSX mainline between Huntington and St. Albans. (Note: Also in 1991, No. 765 was one of five steam locomotives scheduled to be filmed on the Elgin, Joliet and Eastern Railway in the Chicago area for a movie titled Night Ride Down, with the others being NKP 587, Reading 2100, Canadian Pacific 1238, and 1286. The movie was cancelled, due to the early 1990s recession, and when lead actor Harrison Ford left the project over script changes.) On September 19 and 20, 1992, No. 765 pulled excursion trips on former Illinois Central rails between Paducah and Central City, Kentucky, on the Paducah & Louisville Railway. In July 1993, No. 765 and Nickel Plate Road 2-8-2 No. 587 performed a doubleheader while pulling an excursion train, which arrived from Richlands, Virginia, by Norfolk & Western 611 at Fort Wayne, bound for Chicago, Illinois, for that year’s National Railway Historical Society Convention. Shortly after, the engine was briefly re-lettered and renumbered to Chesapeake & Ohio No. 2765 (as a C&O Kanawha of her own) in recognition of the heritage of the route on which the New River Trains traveled.

No. 765 successfully operated over several Class 1 railroads in the Midwest and East Coast, including Conrail, CSX, and Norfolk Southern; pulled the New River Train a record of 32 times by 1993; and headlined 124 trips over the Norfolk Southern by 1994. No. 765 was given the title of "veteran excursion engine" by Trains Magazine in 1992 and named the reason "why boys still leave home" by Railfan & Railroad Magazine in 1994.

By 1993, the locomotive had accumulated 115,000 miles (185,000 km) since its last major overhaul by the Nickel Plate Road, 52,000 miles (84,000 km) of which were incurred during its excursion career alone. The locomotive had developed signs of wear and was originally slated for a running-gear overhaul upon completion of the excursion season that year.

=== Downtime and overhaul ===
Between 1993 and 2001, No. 765 was largely a static exhibit until a complete overhaul was commenced. In the meantime, the Fort Wayne Railroad Historical Society operated Milwaukee Road 261 and restored Chesapeake and Ohio 2716, the same locomotive which had developed firebox problems while on the Southern Railway, under lease from the Kentucky Railway Museum. After initial operations in 1996, No. 2716 required new tubes and flues per newly enacted Federal Railroad Administration regulations. At the time, the railroad historical society decided that it would fully invest its resources into a complete rebuild of No. 765.

Following a series of grant requests, the Fort Wayne Railroad Historical Society was awarded an 80% match through the Transportation Equity Act for the 21st Century, which at the time included historic structures. The remaining 20% was raised through donations and contributions, with a large portion of the rebuild work administered by Fort Wayne Railroad Historical Society volunteers.

Over a period of five years, No. 765 was completely disassembled, with its boiler, frame and running-gear separated and major components re-machined or rebuilt completely. In July 2005, the locomotive underwent a successful steam test and was later rolled-out the following October for the general public. Fort Wayne and Allen County Commissioners designated October 28, 2005, as "Engine no. 765 Day" and the locomotive completed a series of test runs on the Chicago, Fort Wayne, and Eastern Railroad in March 2006.

Overall, the rebuild consumed more than 15,000 hours and cost over $772,000.

=== Second excursion service ===
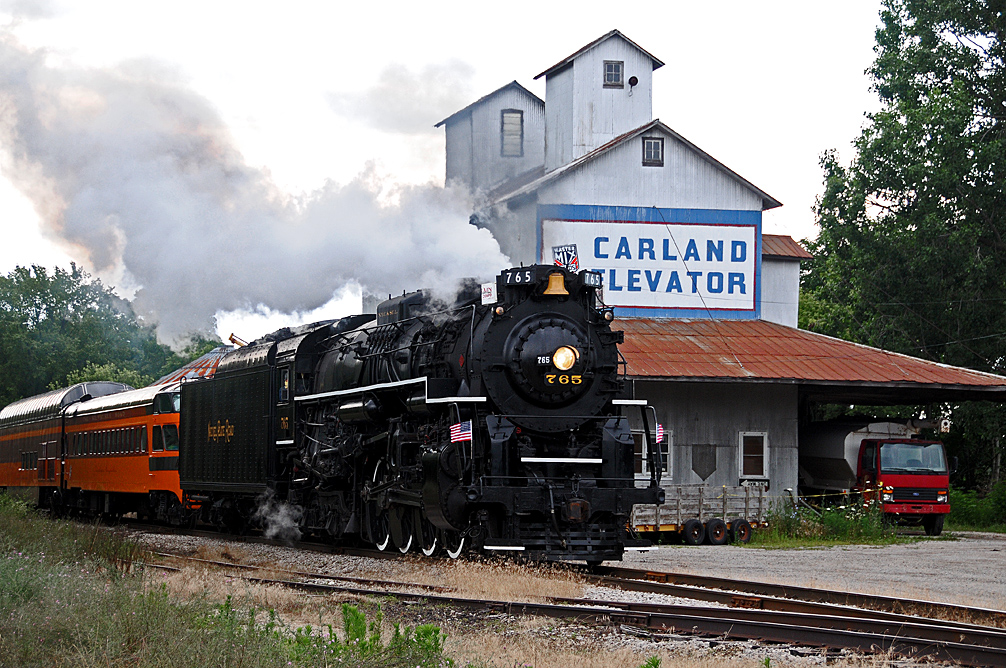
No. 765 passing through Carland, Michigan with an excursion during Train Festival 2009

In 2006, the Fort Wayne Railroad Historical Society was given a "Locomotive Restoration Award" by the Tourist Railway Association, Inc. and the "Outstanding Restoration Award" from the Architecture and Community Heritage Foundation of Fort Wayne. Despite several attempts, the Fort Wayne Railroad Historical Society was initially unable to secure a host railroad on which to operate No. 765, as mounting liability costs and busy, profitable railroads had all but curtailed the majority of mainline steam excursions during No. 765's overhaul. Despite these unfavorable logistics, the Fort Wayne Railroad Historical Society planned and executed No. 765's first trips in 16 years at the Hoosier Valley Railroad Museum on May 21, 2009.

From 2009 to 2011, No. 765 largely operated passenger excursions, photo charters and public events on regional and short line railroads, including the Chesapeake and Indiana, Great Lakes Central, Cuyahoga Valley Scenic Railroad, and Iowa Interstate, the latter of which enabled No. 765 to traverse the Mississippi River for the first time.

In 2012, Norfolk Southern leased No. 765 to operate a series of employee appreciation specials in Ohio, Pennsylvania, West Virginia and Missouri, to mark the company's 30th anniversary. The Fort Wayne Railroad Historical Society, celebrating its own 40th anniversary, outfitted No. 765 with a GPS tracker which was viewed over 120,000 times on August 20, 2012, with a mobile app version downloaded over 19,000 times. Of note, No. 765 is the first steam locomotive to maintain an active Twitter presence: a practice later followed by Union Pacific's steam program.

In 2013, No. 765 was officially included in Norfolk Southern's 21st Century Steam program: an effort to engage the general public and celebrate the railroad's heritage through steam locomotive operations. It operated public trips in Ohio and Pennsylvania in May 2013. Memorial Day Weekend marked the first public steam-powered excursions over Horseshoe Curve since 1977. In August 2013, the Fort Wayne Railroad Historical Society announced plans to run two 225-mile (362 km) round-trip excursions in mid-October, 2013 between Fort Wayne and Lafayette, Indiana, along a line once owned by the Wabash Railroad (and the route of the "Wabash Cannonball"). This was the first time since 1993 that a steam excursion had operated out of Fort Wayne.

In 2014, No. 765 operated a few employee specials including The Commodore Vanderbilt from Elkhart, Indiana to Bryan, Ohio on May 3 and 4, The Nickel Plate Limited from Calumet City, IL to Argos, Indiana on May 10 and 11 and The Mercury Express from Detroit, Michigan to Toledo, Ohio on July 5 and 6 along with The Detroit Arrow public excursion from Detroit, Michigan to Fort Wayne, Indiana on July 12 and 13 and visited Train Expo 2014, run by the Steam Railroading Institute in June.

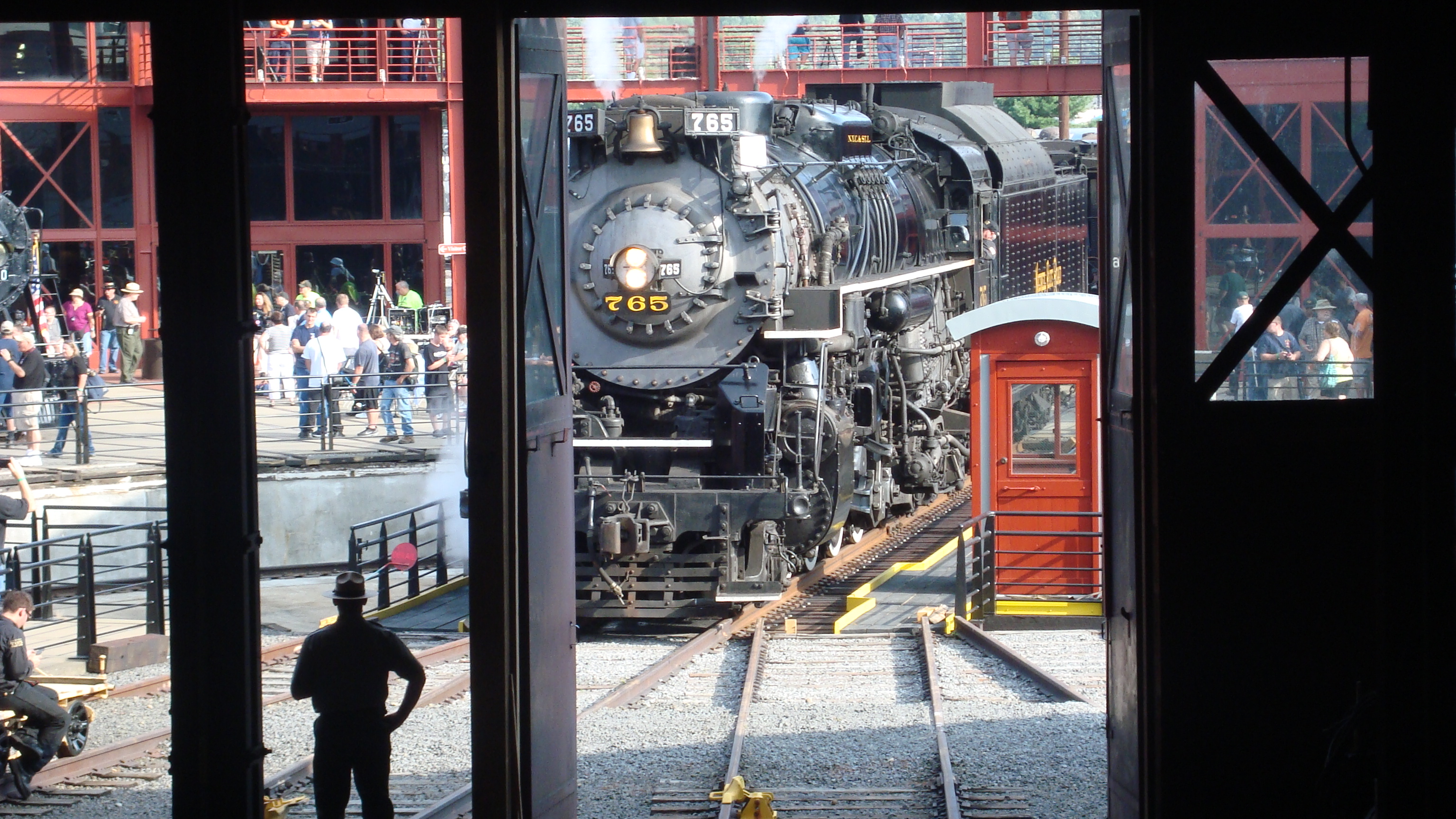
No. 765 on the turntable at the Steamtown National Historic Site in 2015

The 2015 schedule for No. 765 consisted of: July 18–19: Fort Wayne, Indiana, to Lafayette, Indiana, on the route of the old Wabash Cannonball. On the weekend of July 25–26, the Berkshire hauled excursions from Youngstown, Ohio, to Ashtabula, Ohio. On the weekend of August 1–2, it traveled on the former Erie Railroad from Buffalo, New York, to Corning, New York; the highlight of the trip was the run over the Portage Viaduct at Letchworth State Park. On the weekend of August 22–23, No. 765 ran the Lehigh Gorge Special excursion from Allentown, Pennsylvania, to Pittston, Pennsylvania, via Jim Thorpe, Pennsylvania on Reading and Northern rails. While in Jim Thorpe, it met Reading and Northern 425, which was hauling regular passenger excursions for the Lehigh Gorge Scenic Railway. While in Scranton, Pennsylvania, in August–September for Steamtown National Historic Site's Railfest 2015, the locomotive was housed in the roundhouse alongside Nickel Plate Road 759.

Between 2016 and 2018, the Fort Wayne Railroad Historical Society teamed up with Metra, Chicago's commuter rail system, to pull excursions; No. 765 pulled excursions between The Glen/North Glenview station, on Metra's Milwaukee District North Line, and Janesville, Wisconsin, with the train being called the Varsity in June 2016. (Note: There were originally plans for an excursion from Chicago's Union Station to Galesburg, Illinois, in partnership with Amtrak, as the Galesburg Zephyr. However, this was eventually canceled due to low ticket sales.) At that time in August, No. 765 regained its original Mars light. In 2017 and 2018, No. 765 pulled the Joliet Rocket over Metra's Rock Island District between Chicago and Joliet, with music and food being provided for passengers at Chicago's LaSalle Street Station, which was originally the Chicago terminus for the Nickel Plate Road. In 2020, No. 765 was unable to pull any excursions due to the COVID-19 pandemic and was only steamed up on the weekend of October 2–4, 2020.

In September 2021, No. 765 returned to the Cuyahoga Valley Scenic Railroad once more to pull more excursion trains on their trackage, and during the final days of this visit, the locomotive reunited in Bellevue with Nickel Plate Road No. 757, which recently received a cosmetic restoration by the Mad River and NKP Railroad Museum. Since 2022, No. 765 has visited the Indiana Northeastern Railroad to haul the Indiana Rail Experience excursions on their trackage as part of a multi-year partnership between them and the Fort Wayne Railroad Historical Society. In January 2025, it was announced that No. 765 would return to the Cuyahoga Valley Scenic Railroad for the first time in three years; the locomotive was unable to visit during the 2023 and 2024 seasons due to track issues. No. 765 operated the Cuyahoga Valley's "Steam in the Valley" excursions on April 25–27 and May 2–4. On May 10, 2025, No. 765 operated a series of employee excursions over the Wheeling and Lake Erie Railway from Brewster, Ohio to Bowerston, Ohio for their 35th anniversary, marking the locomotive’s first excursions over the Wheeling since 1989. On September 7, 2026, No. 765 pulled an 85 car empty grain train from Pleasant Lake, Indiana to Reading, Michigan on the Indiana Northeastern Railroad.

==== Tourism ====
On average, the locomotive experiences 3,000 visitors a day when operating, with visitor and passenger numbers running between 40,000 and 60,000 ticket buyers in 2009 and 2011 in less than 30 days, respectively. Typical passenger trains carry anywhere from 600 to 1,000 people at a time, with tickets for many trips selling out in 24 hours.

Press reports indicate the continuous presence of large crowds of "locals and out-of-towners" and on No. 765's ability to boost tourism in the towns that it travels through. In 2012, the Pittsburgh Tribune's headline photo proclaimed that No. 765 was the "engine that still can", and later in 2013 called it a "crowd favorite", with CBS Pittsburgh describing it as "400 tons of Americana."

When not operating excursions, No. 765 is maintained in a restoration shop in New Haven by a crew of 70–100 volunteers throughout the year. The shop is open to the public and houses a variety of other railroad equipment, including vintage steam and diesel locomotives, passenger cars, cabooses, and more.

The operation of the locomotive is underwritten primarily by memberships to the Fort Wayne Railroad Historical Society, donations and revenue from ticket sales.

In addition to passenger excursion service, No. 765 was the centerpiece of a proposed riverfront development project called Headwaters Junction, in the locomotive's hometown of Fort Wayne. The plan, endorsed as "big, bold, and transformational" by city leaders and civic groups, called for the locomotive and Fort Wayne Railroad Historical Society operations to be based in a mixed-use attraction combining railroad tourism, river access, walking trails and "retail, restaurant, residential, recreational and entertainment businesses." A local task force recommended that Headwaters Junction "not be overlooked...when developing a vision for our riverfront." However, the Headwaters Junction project did not pan out as originally hoped, with a variety of factors limiting efforts to expand. A down-sized version of the concept, using elements from the Headwaters Junction project, called Pufferbelly Junction Inc. was established in downtown Fort Wayne. The Society shifted their focus to moving their original Headwaters Junction project to north east Indiana where the Indiana Rail Experience would act as a replacement.

== See also ==
- New York Central 3001

== Bibliography ==
- Wrinn, Jim (2000). Steam's Camelot: Southern and Norfolk Southern Excursions in Color (1st ed.). TLC Publishing. ISBN 1-883089-56-5.
