= Edgar L. Harden =

Edgar L. Harden (October 31, 1906 – May 2, 1996) served as president of Michigan State University from 1977 to 1979. He also served as president of Northern Michigan University from 1956 to 1967, when enrollment grew from 800 to 7,600, about where it stands today.

Academic offices
Preceded by Clifton Reginald Wharton, Jr.	President of Michigan State University; 1977–1978 (Acting); 1978–1979	Succeeded by M. Cecil Mackey
