= Cannibalization (parts) =

Repair using parts from similar devices

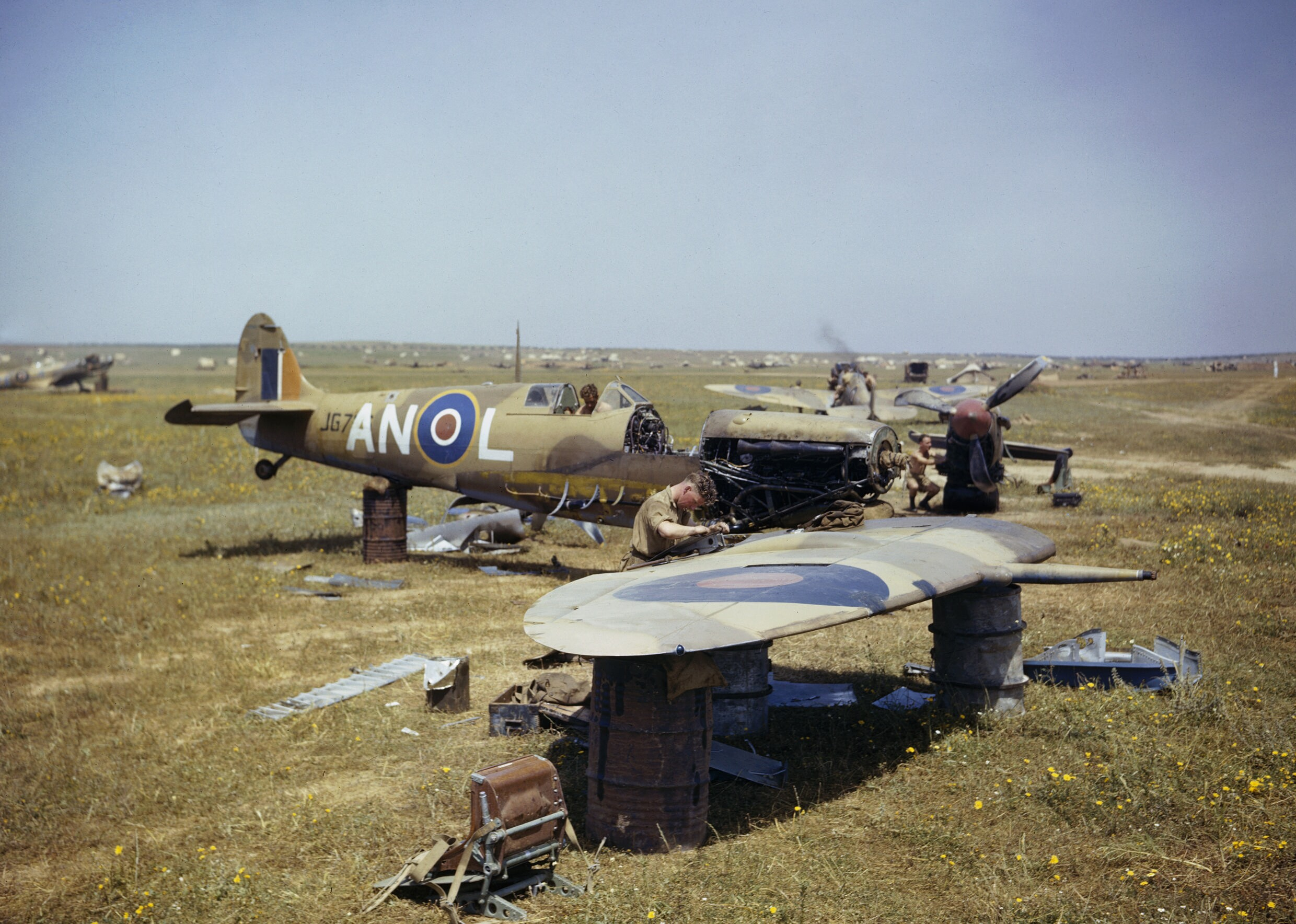
A Supermarine Spitfire of No 417 Squadron, Royal Canadian Air Force, being cannibalized for parts at Gabès, Tunisia. The aircraft was removed from service after colliding with a Hudson during take-off on 19 April 1943.

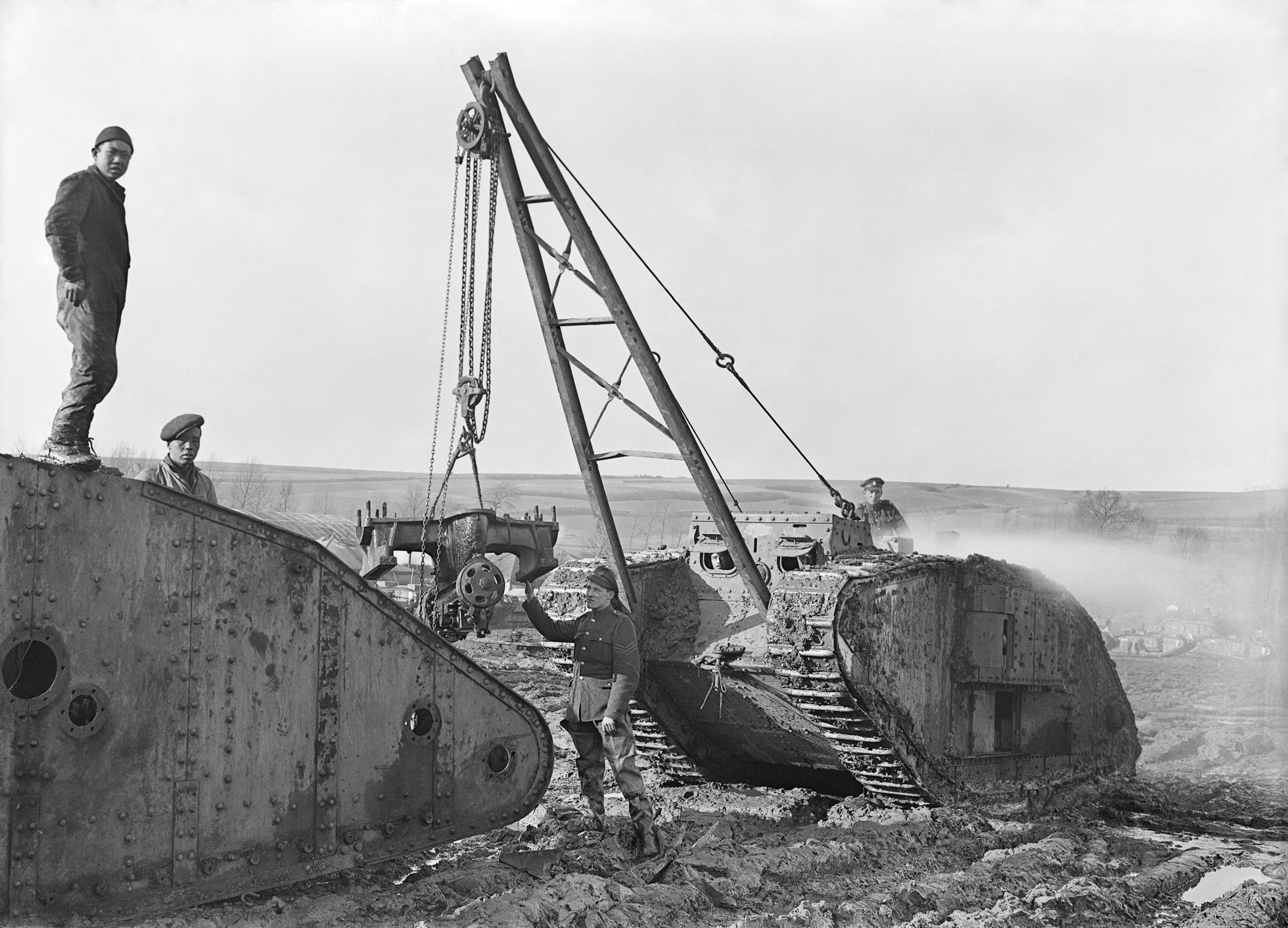
Members of the Chinese Labour Corps cannibalizing parts from a salvaged Mark IV tank at the central stores of the Tank Corps, Teneur, Spring 1918.

In the maintenance of mechanical or electronic systems with interchangeable parts, cannibalization refers to the practice of removing parts or subsystems necessary for repair from another similar device, rather than from inventory, usually when resources become limited. The source system is usually crippled as a result, perhaps only temporarily, in order to allow the recipient device to function properly again.

Cannibalization usually occurs due to unavailability of spare parts, an emergency, long resupply times, physical distance, or insufficient planning/budget. Cannibalization can also be due to reusing surplus inventory. At the end of World War II a large quantity of high quality, but unusable war surplus equipment such as radar devices made a ready source of parts to build radio equipment. Cannibalization can also be an economic/ecological choice for end of life products. Germany, rather than sell/export functional used cars, will disassemble and store parts no longer being produced because their individual value exceed the whole car's value. The same thing happens to certain semiconductors where they are "pulled" from working machines and sold for a profit.

In the electronics market, machines being cannibalized are known as parts machines or kept in a boneyard until needed.

== Diminishing manufacturing sources ==
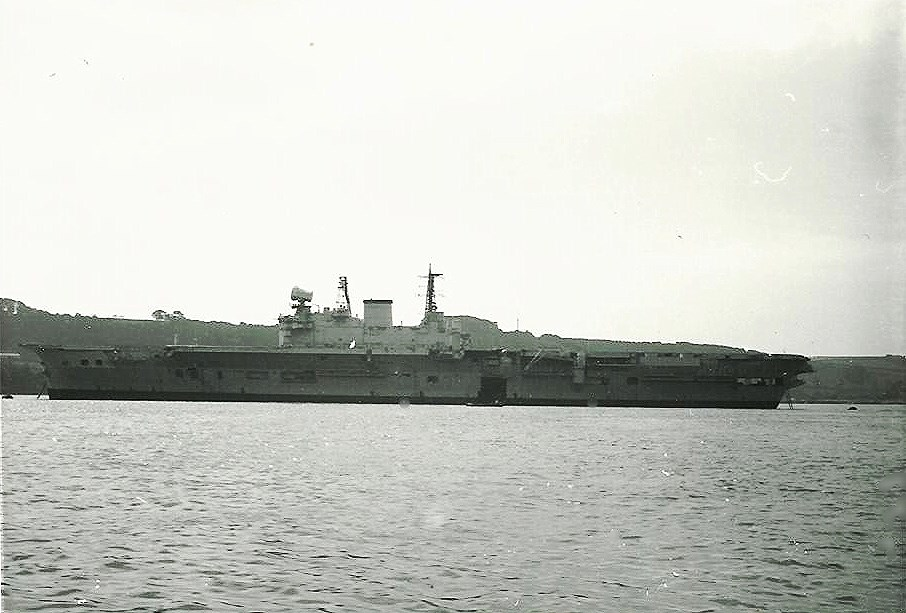
The Royal Navy aircraft carrier HMS Eagle moored in the Hamoaze. In 1972, the ship was decommissioned from active service but retained to serve as a source of spares for HMS Ark Royal.

Sometimes, removing parts from old equipment is the only way to obtain spare parts, either because they are no longer made, are obsolete, or can only be manufactured in large quantities. In logistics, this is known as Diminishing Manufacturing Sources (DMS).

This is often the case in the military, and ships and aircraft, as well as other expensive equipment that is produced in limited quantities. Such was the case with the aircraft carrier USS Kitty Hawk, the sole survivor of a class of three ships built during the early-1960s. The ship herself is over forty years old, and having manufacturers build individual custom replacement parts would be highly impractical, and thus decommissioned ships, such as the USS Independence, have been utilized for the necessary parts to keep the Kitty Hawk in operation.

Another example is the Union Pacific's 4-8-4 locomotive 838 is used as a spare parts source for the 844, since the type has been out of production for decades and its manufacturer no longer exists along with another engine, which is the Canadian National 3377 which is a source of parts for the Canadian National 3254.

One strategy used to combat DMS is to buy additional inventory during the production run of a system or part, in quantities sufficient to cover the expected number of failures. This strategy is known as a lifetime buy.

== See also ==
- Aircraft boneyard
- Knockdown aircraft
- Wrecking yard
