= St. Louis–San Francisco 4018 =

Preserved American 2-8-2 locomotive

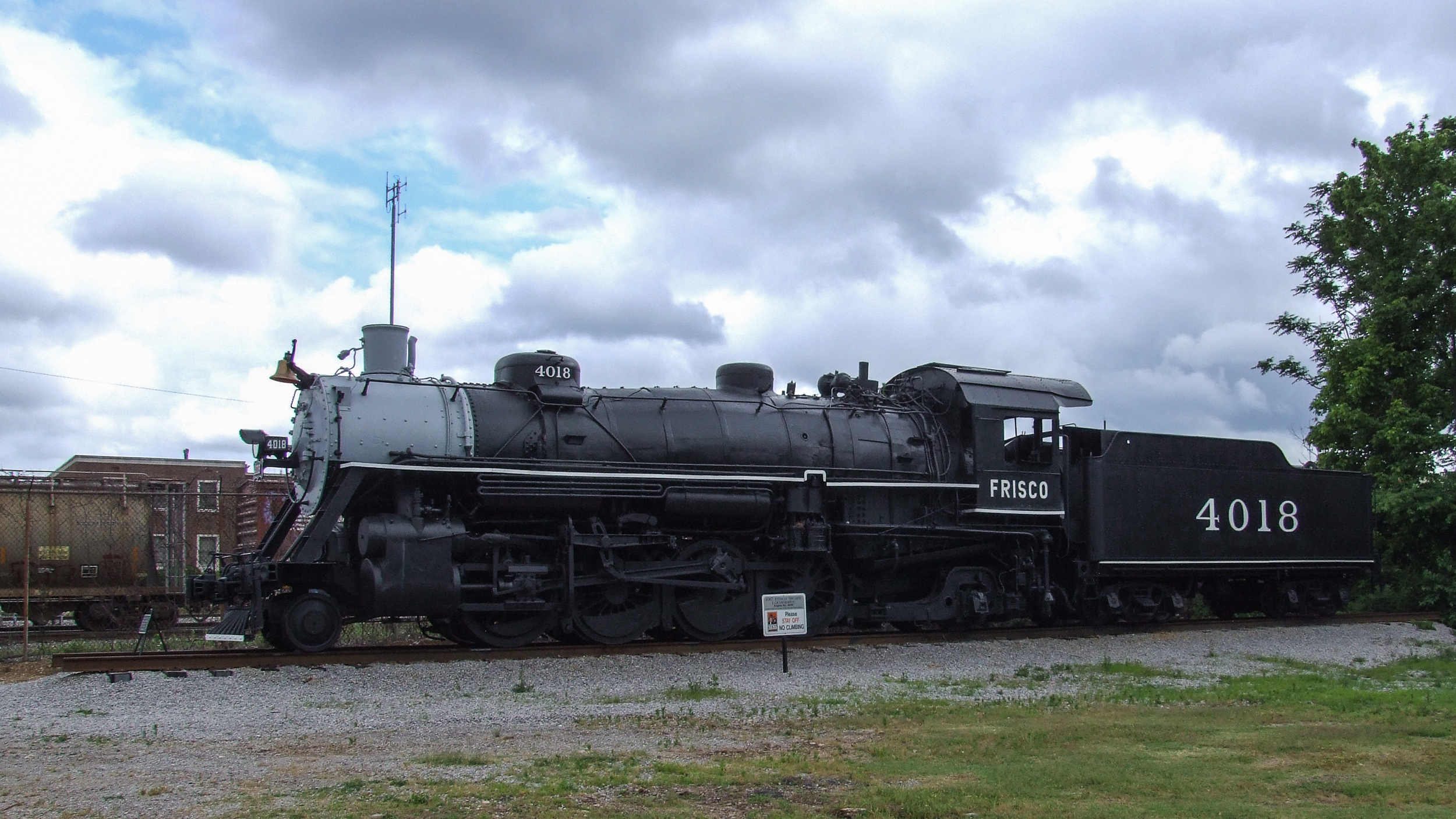
- SLSF 4018 on display at Sloss Furnaces, May 2011
Type and origin
- Power type: Steam
- Builder: Lima Locomotive Works
- Serial number: 5872
- Model: USRA Light Mikado
- Build date: 1919
Specifications
- Configuration
  - Whyte: 2-8-2
- Gauge: 4 ft 8 1/2 in (1,435 mm)
- Leading dia.: 33 in (0.838 m)
- Driver dia.: 63 in (1.600 m)
- Trailing dia.: 43 in (1.092 m)
- Adhesive weight: 228,500 lb (103.6 t)
- Loco weight: 303,000 lb (137.4 t)
- Fuel type: Coal
- Boiler pressure: 200 psi (1.38 MPa)
- Cylinders: Two, outside
- Cylinder size: 26 in × 30 in (660 mm × 762 mm)
- Valve gear: Walschaerts
- Valve type: Piston valves
- Train brakes: Air
- Couplers: Knuckle
Performance figures
- Tractive effort: 54,700 lbf (243.32 kN)
- Factor of adh.: 4.18
Career
- Operators: Frisco Lines
- Class: 4000
- Number in class: 23
- Numbers: 4018
- Locale: Birmingham District
- Delivered: 1923
- Last run: February 29, 1952
- Retired: 1952
- Preserved: May 29, 1952
- Restored: 2009 (cosmeticlly)
- Current owner: City of Birmingham, Alabama
- Disposition: On static display

St. Louis–San Francisco 4018 is a class USRA Light 2-8-2 "Mikado" type steam locomotive which operated for three decades hauling freight between Bessemer and Birmingham, Alabama (United States), on the St. Louis–San Francisco Railway (SLSF or "Frisco"). It went on display at the Alabama State Fairgrounds in 1952 and is one of only a few locomotives of its type that survive.

== History ==
Called a "war baby" because it was part of the build-up of cargo capacity ordered through the United States Railroad Administration during World War I, Engine No. 4018 was constructed in October 1919 to a standardized USRA Light Mikado design by the Lima Locomotive Works of Lima, Ohio, for the Pennsylvania Railroad. The engine is a 2-8-2 locomotive of the USRA standard Mikado type, inherited from Japan, and is coal-fired. The standard gauge locomotive was capable of 54,700 pounds-force (243.3 kN) of tractive effort, running two 27-by-30-inch (686 mm × 762 mm) cylinders under 200 pounds per square inch (1.38 MPa) of boiler pressure. The driving wheels are 63 inches (1.600 m) in diameter and its wheelbase is 36 ft 1 in (11.00 m). The overall length of the engine and its 10,000 US gallons (38,000 L; 8,300 imp gal) tender is just under 82 ft (25.0 m). The locomotive stands 19 ft (5.8 m) tall.

Engine No. 4018 was sold to the St Louis – San Francisco Railway (Frisco Railway) in 1923 and spent much of the next three decades carrying transport between Bessemer and Birmingham. The USRA Light 2-8-2 "Mikado" design itself was later improved upon by the Lima Locomotive Works evolving into the 2-8-4 Berkshire locomotive. Part of this evolution involved increasing the size of the Mikado's firebox. This larger firebox improved the engine's coal burning efficiency, however the additional weight facility adding the second wheel set to the trailing truck. But steam engines were phased out in favor of diesel locomotives in the mid-20th century. This locomotive has the distinction of being the last Frisco steam locomotive in regular service, completing its final run (a five-mile trek from Bessemer to Birmingham, Alabama) on February 29, 1952. It is quite possibly the last steam locomotive to operate within the Birmingham metro area.

== Retirement ==
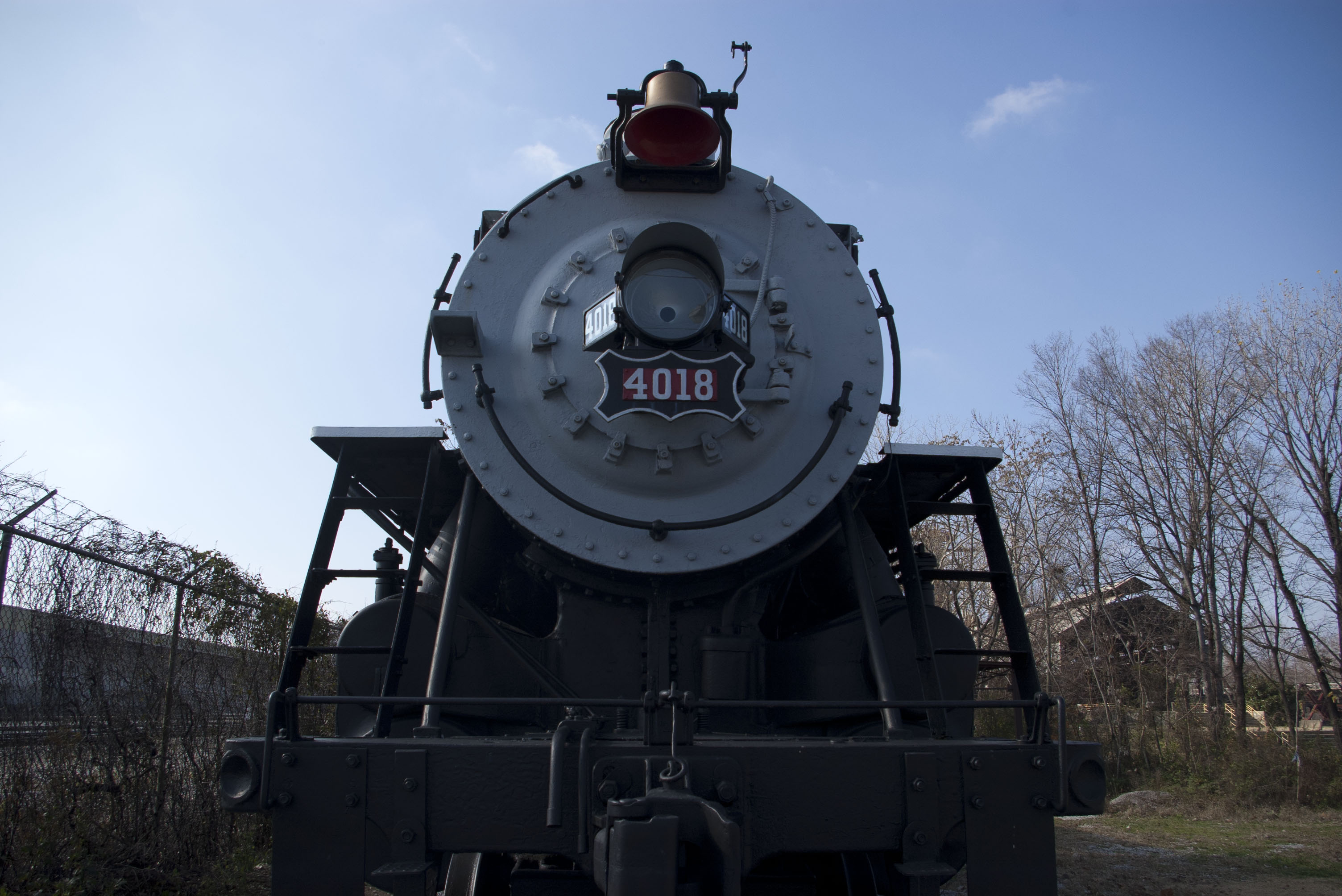
The cosmetically restored No. 4018 on display at Sloss Furnaces in Birmingham, Alabama.

At the request of then-Birmingham mayor J. W. Morgan, the locomotive was spared from the scrappers torch and given a full cosmetic overhaul before making its final five-mile (8 km) run to Birmingham on February 29, 1952. A. M. Ball, assistant to the president of the Frisco, was in attendance for the occasion.

The engine was turned over to the city on May 29 of that year. It traveled on Atlantic Coast Line Railroad trackage to the vicinity of the fairgrounds. From there a special spur was constructed of panel track to deliver it the selected spot near the "Kiddieland" amusement park. Despite one derailment, the locomotive was brought safely to its new home and a metal shed was built over it. Frisco employees were regularly sent over in the ensuing years to keep the engine in good condition.

Efforts to have the train moved to the Heart of Dixie Railroad Museum in the 1970s broke down. A later group entered negotiations to secure the locomotive for restoration and possible use on steam excursions, but were also unsuccessful.

In the late 1980s a cosmetic restoration was begun by a group of area railroad enthusiasts volunteering their labor. The bell and headlight were removed for safe-keeping during the work, which involved sheet-metal patches over rusted areas and repainting. A new front coupler knuckle was donated and installed. The effort ran out of steam, however, and was never completed - partly for lack of security at the site.

As the city of Birmingham planned a major redevelopment of the fairgrounds area in 2009, fund-raising began for moving the engine and tender to Sloss Furnaces National Historic Landmark. The move took place February 19–21, 2009. Since the move, a cosmetic restoration has been completed.

Its sister, Frisco 4003 is on the National Register of Historic Places, on display at the Fort Smith Trolley Museum in Fort Smith, Arkansas.
