= Grand Trunk Western 4070 =

Preserved GTW S-3-a class 2-8-2 steam locomotive

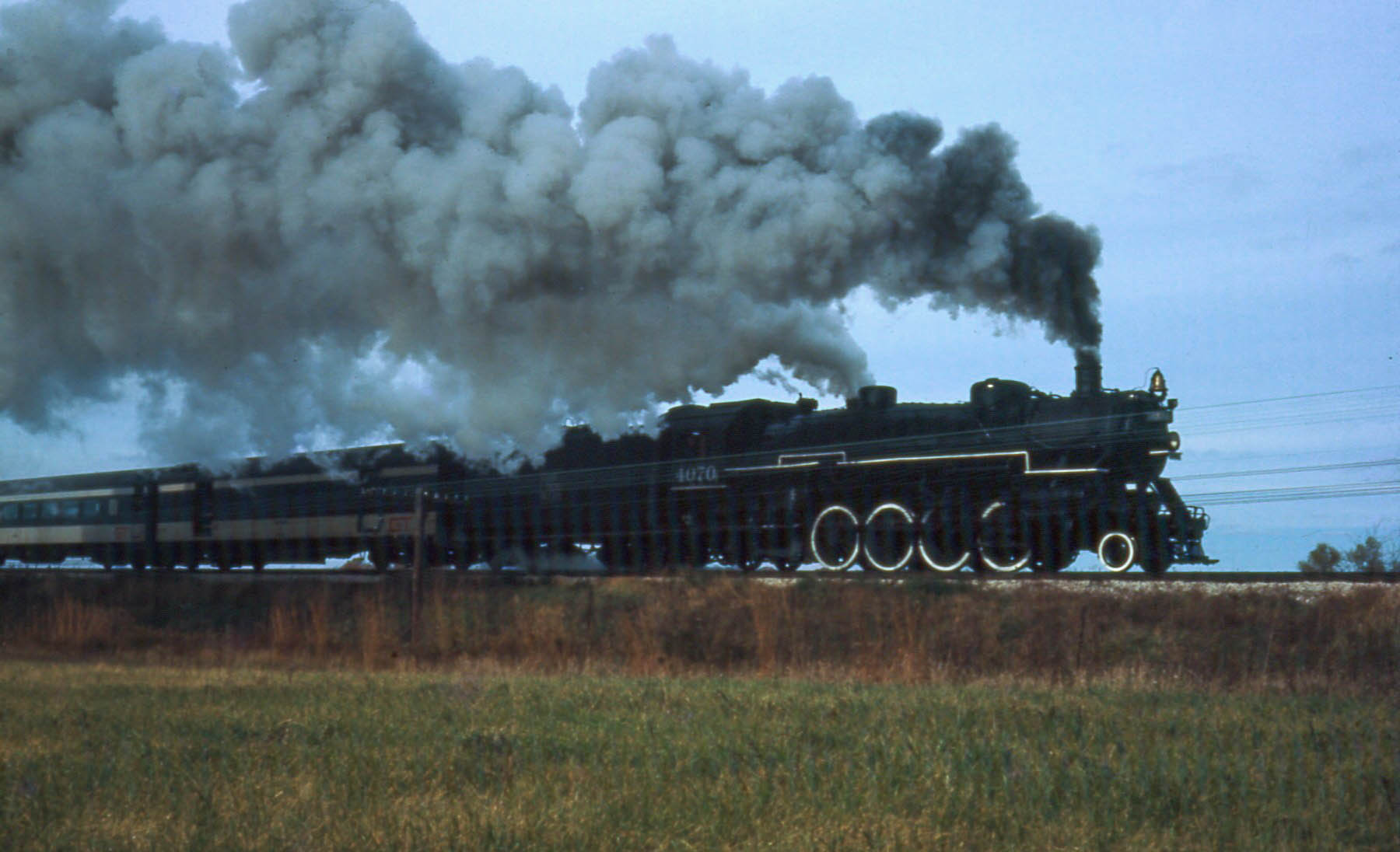
- No. 4070 pulling an excursion in Indiana, on November 3, 1968
Type and origin
- Power type: Steam
- Builder: American Locomotive Company
- Order number: S 1259
- Serial number: 60319
- Model: S3a
- Build date: December 1918
Specifications
- Configuration
  - Whyte: 2-8-2
  - UIC: 1’D1
- Gauge: 4 ft 8 1/2 in (1,435 mm)
- Driver dia.: 63 in (1,600 mm)
- Wheelbase: 71.45 ft (21.78 m)
  - Engine: 36.08 ft (11.00 m)
  - Drivers: 16.75 ft (5.11 m)
- Adhesive weight: 231,000 lb (105,000 kg)
- Loco weight: 306,500 lb (139,000 kg)
- Tender weight: 187,500 lb (85,000 kg)
- Total weight: 494,000 lb (224,000 kg)
- Fuel type: Coal
- Fuel capacity: 16 t (16 long tons; 18 short tons) (S-3-a); 18 t (18 long tons; 20 short tons) (S-3-c)
- Water cap.: 10,000 US gal (38,000 L; 8,300 imp gal) (S-3-a); 12,000 US gal (45,000 L; 10,000 imp gal) (S-3-c)
- Firebox
  - Grate area: 66.7 sq ft (6.20 m^{2})
- Boiler pressure: 200 psi (1.38 MPa)
- Heating surface
  - Firebox: 259 sq ft (24.1 m^{2})
- Cylinders: Two, outside
- Cylinder size: 26 in × 30 in (660 mm × 760 mm)
- Valve gear: Walschaerts
- Valve type: Piston valves
- Loco brake: Air
- Train brakes: Air
- Couplers: Knuckle
Performance figures
- Maximum speed: 65 miles per hour (105 km/h)
- Tractive effort: 54,724 lb (24,822 kg) = 55%
- Factor of adh.: 4.23
Career
- Operators: Grand Trunk Railway; Grand Trunk Western Railroad; Midwest Railway Preservation Society
- Class: S-3-a
- Numbers: GTR 474; GTW 3734; GTW 4070
- Retired: March 29, 1960 (revenue service); 1990 (1st excursion service)
- Preserved: 1961
- Restored: November 3, 1968 (1st restoration)
- Current owner: Midwest Railway Preservation Society, successor to Midwest Railway Historical Foundation
- Disposition: Undergoing restoration to operating condition

Grand Trunk Western 4070 is a preserved S-3-a class 2-8-2 "USRA Light Mikado" type steam locomotive, built by the American Locomotive Company (ALCO) in December 1918 for the Grand Trunk Railway (GTR) as No. 474. It was later re-numbered to 3734 by the Grand Trunk Western (GTW), after the GTR was absorbed into Canadian National (CN). In the late 1950s, the locomotive received a larger tender from an S-3-c class locomotive, and it was further re-numbered to 4070.

In 1960, No. 4070 was retired from revenue service, and it was subsequently sold to Lou Keller, who in turn sold it to the Midwest Railway Preservation Society (MRPS). The MRPS restored the locomotive to operating condition in 1968, and they used it to pull a number of excursions on the Bessemer and Lake Erie Railroad, and later the Cuyahoga Valley Scenic Railroad (CVSR). In 1990, the locomotive was taken out of service for an overhaul. As of 2026, the locomotive is undergoing restoration to operating condition by the MRPS.

== History ==
=== Revenue service ===
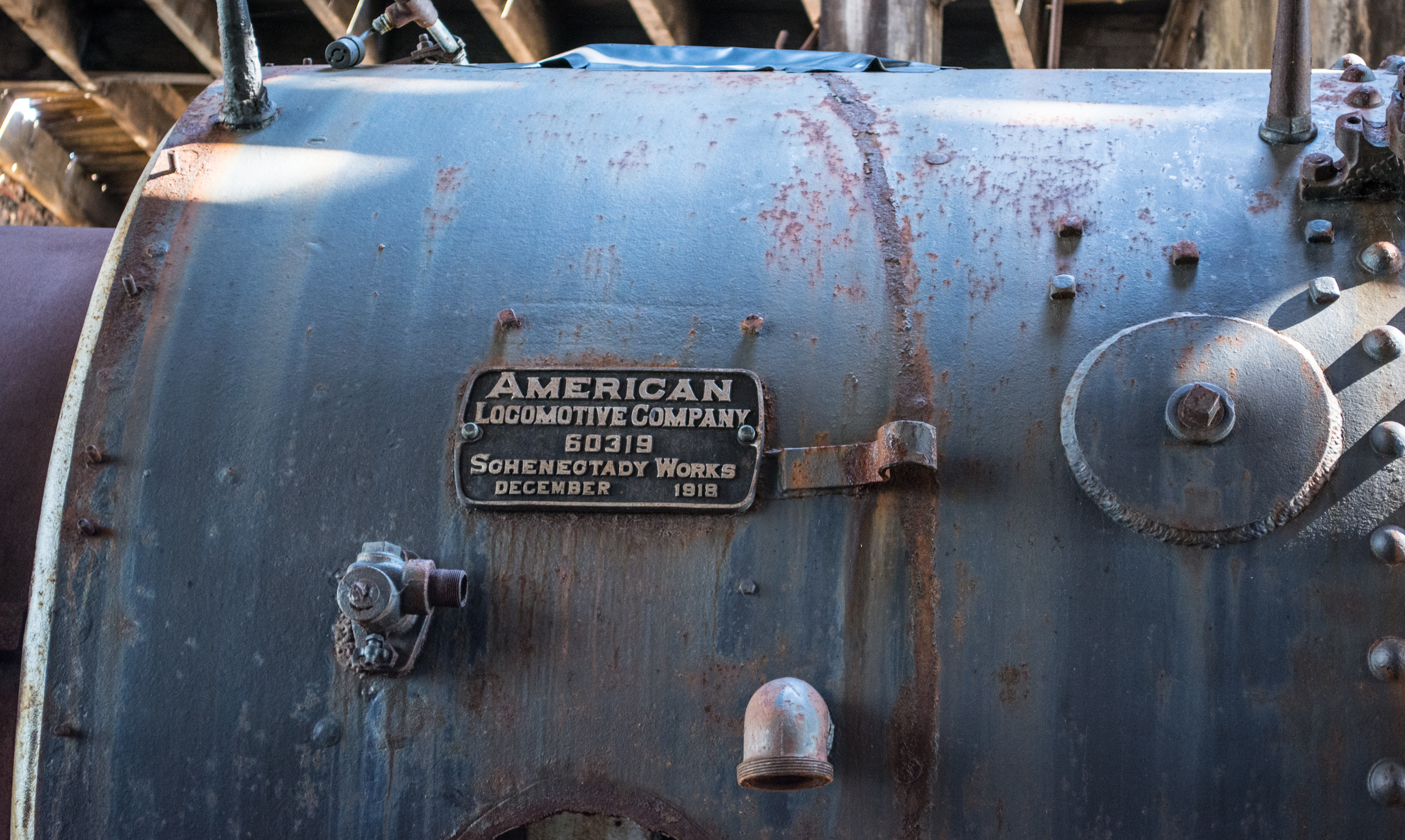
No. 4070's builder's plate

No. 4070—originally numbered 474—was built in December 1918 by the American Locomotive Company (ALCO) in Schenectady, New York, as part of the United States Railroad Administration's (USRA) order for forty Light Mikado locomotives (Nos. 440-479) to be assigned to the Grand Trunk Railway. The locomotive was primarily assigned in revenue service to pull freight and commuter trains out of Detroit, Michigan.

In 1925, following the GTR's acquisition by the Canadian National Railway (CN) and reorganization as the Grand Trunk Western (GTW), No. 474 was renumbered to 3734—the rest of the S-3-a's were renumbered as 3700-3739—and it was rebuilt with an extended smokebox and an enclosed coffin feedwater heater. After 1942, No. 3734 was one of only five S-3-a's (Nos. 3717, 3723, 3732, 3734, and 3735) that remained on the GTW, with the rest being transferred to CN and the Central Vermont Railway. In 1948, the No. 3734 was selected to serve as a backup locomotive for President Harry Truman's re-election train, which ran through Michigan.

During the 1950s, No. 3734 was primarily relegated to operate out of Durand, Michigan. In 1958, the locomotive was rebuilt at the GTW's Battle Creek, Michigan shops with a larger tender from a retired S-3-c class 2-8-2, boosting its coal capacity to 18 tonnes (18,000 kg) and water capacity to 12,000 U.S. gallons (10,000 imp gal). It was also renumbered again to 4070, to avoid duplication with CN's new fleet of 3700 series RS-18 locomotives.

No. 4070 was last assigned by the GTW to the "Oxford gravel run" in the Cass City Subdivision, where it pulled gravel and limestone trains between Pontiac and Oxford, Michigan. No. 4070 was retired from revenue service on March 29, 1960, after it pulled its final revenue train from Pontiac to Durand, and the GTW completed dieselization of their operations that same month.

=== Excursion service ===
No. 4070 was subsequently stored in Durand, and a nonprofit organization in Middleville, Michigan—called the National Museum of Steam Propulsion—began raising funds to acquire the locomotive, with funds being obtained from GTW excursions behind 4-8-4 No. 6323. The Museum scheduled for No. 4070 to pull their own excursion trains throughout Michigan, beginning with a July 29, 1961 excursion on the New York Central (NYC) mainline between Grand Rapids and Jackson. For unknown reasons, all their plans with the locomotive had fallen through, and the organization quickly dissolved.

By the end of 1961, No. 4070 was purchased by Louis S. Keller, a member of the National Railway Historical Society's (NRHS) Iowa Chapter. In May 1966, the Midwest Railway Historical Foundation (MRHF) of Cleveland, Ohio reached an agreement with Keller to lease the locomotive for five-years and restore it to operating condition, and No. 4070 was moved into storage under the Cleveland Union Terminal. In December 1967, No. 4070 was moved again to the Chicago and Western Indiana's (C&WI) 47th Street Roundhouse in Chicago, Illinois, where the MRHF contracted Richard “Dick” Jensen and his crew to help restore the locomotive.

As part of the agreement, Jensen would use No. 4070 to pull two passenger excursions on the GTW mainline. On November 3, 1968, No. 4070 operated for the first time in over eight years, and it pulled an excursion between Dearborn Station in Chicago and South Bend, Indiana, commemorating the 50th anniversary of the locomotive's 1918 construction date. On March 23, 1969, No. 4070 pulled a second GTW excursion between Chicago and South Bend, but the run was plagued with various problems; No. 4070 ran out of water while in motion; it broke down from poor quality coal; when the excursion's conductors and brakemen's legal working limits ran out, the train had to sit at Valparaiso to wait for a new crew to arrive; while waiting at Valparaiso, No. 4070 ran out of steam for its generator, resulting in a power outage in its passenger cars. No. 4070 and its train had to be towed by a diesel-powered freight train, and it returned to Chicago over nine hours late at 5:00 am the following day. On August 31, No. 4070 pulled its first official MRHF excursion from Erie to Greenville, Pennsylvania on the Bessemer and Lake Erie (B&LE) mainline. In 1971, MRHF bought out their lease with Lou Keller, gaining full ownership of the No. 4070. From 1971 to 1973, the MRHF leased a 1-mile (1.6 km) spur from the B&LE at Conneaut Lake Park, and No. 4070 was used to pull summer weekend excursions on the line. Unsatisfied with the length of the spur, the MRHF searched for a longer railroad to run excursions with No. 4070.

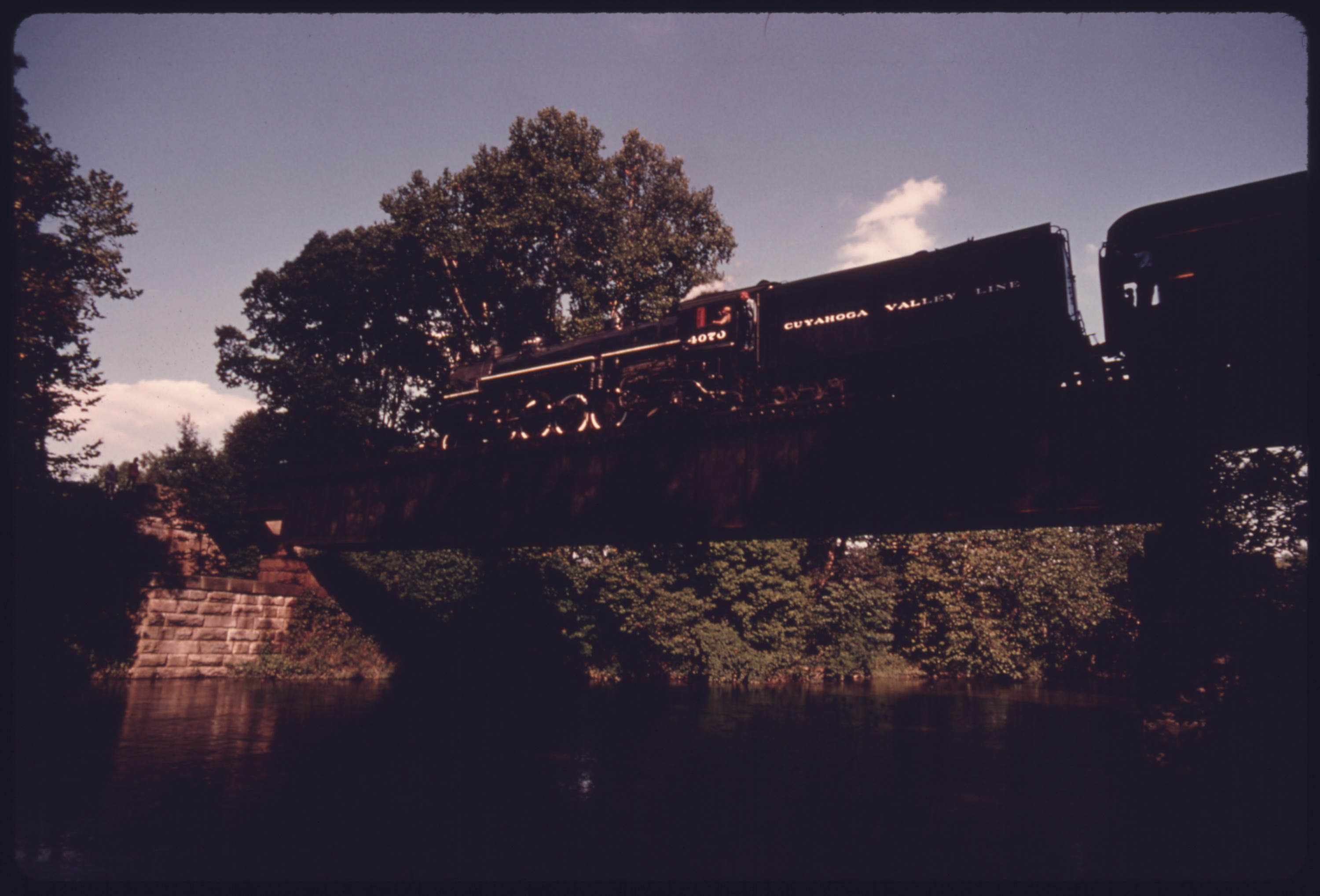
No. 4070 crossing the Cuyahoga River near Akron, Ohio, in September 1975

The MRHF approached the Chessie System to operate regular steam excursion trains on their former Baltimore and Ohio (B&O) Valley Division between Cleveland and Akron, Ohio, and with local community leaders supporting the idea, it led to the formation of the Cuyahoga Valley Preservation and Scenic Railway Association (CVP&SRA). Chessie System chairman Cyrus Eaton generously agreed to allow the foundation trackage rights. No. 4070 was relocated to a leased stall at the former B&O Clark Avenue roundhouse in Cleveland. On June 28, 1975, No. 4070 pulled the new Cuyahoga Valley Line's (CVL) inaugural train from Brookside Park outside the Cleveland Zoo to Hale Farm and Village.

During the first operations seasons of the CVL, every excursion train was mandated to be assisted by a Chessie diesel locomotive for whenever No. 4070 suffered a mechanical problem, but as the MRHF proved the locomotive's reliability, the requirement was lifted in later years. In September 1975, No. 4070 was moved to Pittsburgh, Pennsylvania, and it pulled three excursions for Steam Tours, Inc. on the Pittsburgh and Lake Erie (P&LE) mainline between Pittsburgh and Brownsville. During the first excursion, the fireman was struggling to get the locomotive's Duplex stoker to work before he resorted to hand firing it for the remainder of the run. In May 1977, No. 4070 pulled two more excursions for Steam Tours while doubleheading with Reading 2102 on the Conrail mainline between Pittsburgh and Altoona, Pennsylvania, and en route, the two locomotives travelled over the Horseshoe Curve.

In 1982, No. 4070 pulled an excursion train on the CVL while being fitted with a headboard that stated “The American Flyer”. In September 1983, No. 4070 was temporarily masqueraded as a Chicago, Burlington and Quincy locomotive, and it was ferried to the New York and Lake Erie Railroad in South Dayton, New York for filming of The Natural, a 1984 baseball film starring Robert Redford.

In 1985, No. 4070 was removed from service, since Chessie successor CSX had obtained permission to abandon the Valley Division, undermining the CVL’s operations. In 1987, the National Park Service (NPS) purchased the Valley Division with the intention of making the right-of-way an integral part of the Cuyahoga Valley National Recreation Area, and the CVL was able to resume operations with No. 4070 the following year.

No. 4070 continued service on the CVL until 1990, when it suffered some major mechanical difficulties. Upon inspection, the locomotive was found to be in need of a major rebuild. Since the cost of the rebuild proved to be expensive, No. 4070 was retired from excursion service, and the CVL went on to operate their own excursions without the MRHF's assistance. Dissembly of No. 4070 began, and it continued at a slow pace during the 1990s. Financial difficulties within the MRHF at the time and a stall collapse of the Cleveland roundhouse dwindled work on No. 4070 before it stopped.

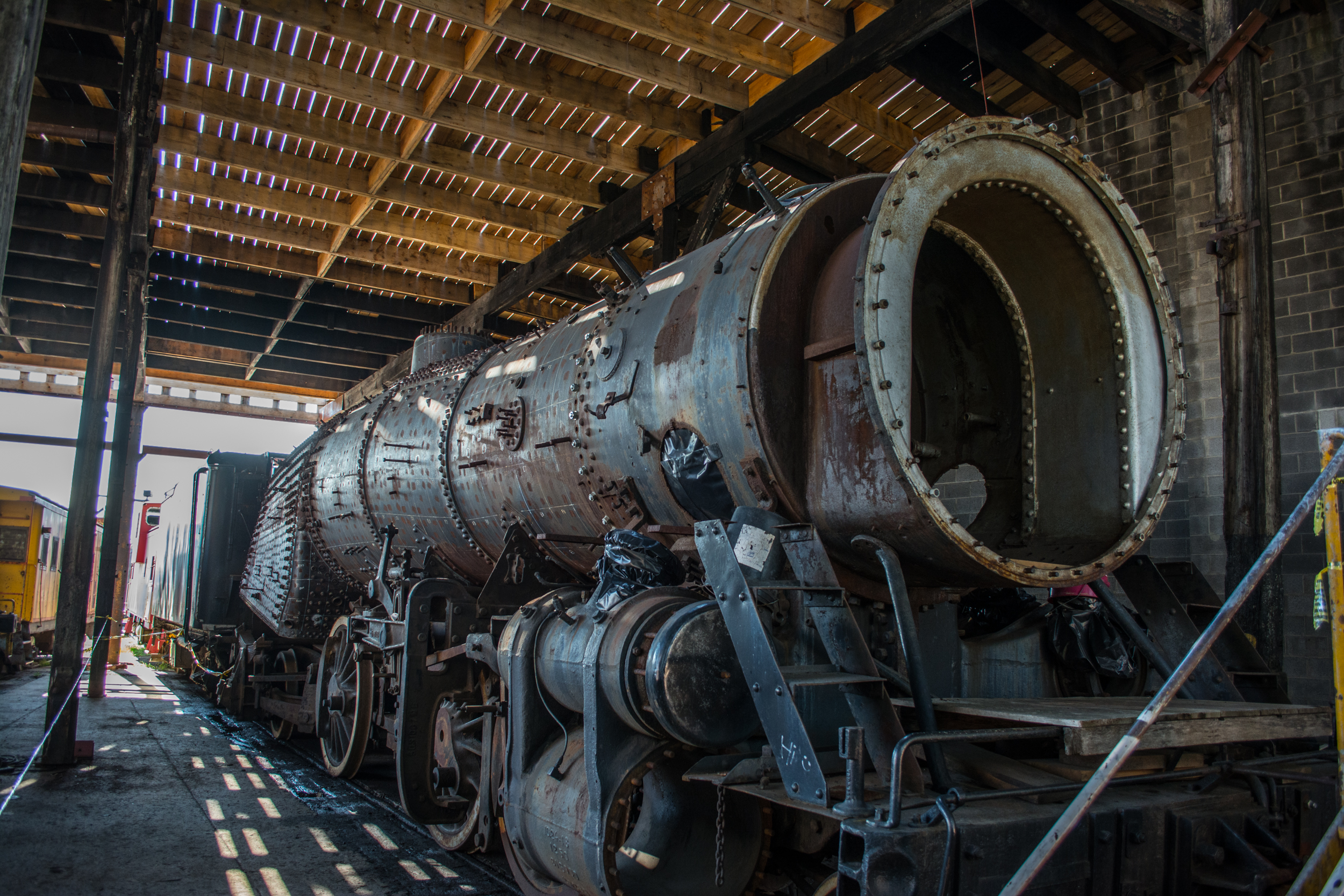
No. 4070 undergoing restoration inside the Ex-Baltimore and Ohio roundhouse in Cleveland, on September 9, 2017

In 2011, the process of restoring No. 4070 to operational condition began by members of the Midwest Railway Preservation Society (MRPS). The locomotive's boiler and tender both underwent ultrasonic testing. The locomotive's drypipe, and front and rear tube sheets were found to be in need of replacing. The smokebox, firebox, frame, running gear, tender and many assorted parts needed major work before No. 4070 was able to run again. No. 4070's restoration was estimated to cost $1,290,000 to complete. As of 2024, the MRPS has re-organized their portion of the roundhouse for more suitable space to work on No. 4070, and they have seamed the crack the locomotive's frame has had from its 1955 turntable accident.

== Accidents and incidents ==
- On June 9, 1955, No. 3734 fell into a turntable pit at Milwaukee Junction in Detroit, when the locomotive’s air pump failed. No. 3734 was quickly repaired.
- On May 15, 1977, during the return run of the first doubleheader excursion with Reading 2102 between Pittsburgh and Altoona, Pennsylvania, No. 4070 snapped its right eccentric rod at speed while climbing Horseshoe Curve, and the excursion had to be completed behind diesel locomotives. The damaged eccentric rod was subsequently repaired, and No. 4070 completed the second doubleheader excursion without incident.
- On June 10, 1979, No. 4070 derailed as it was pulling a CVL train at a rail yard in Akron, and a Chessie diesel locomotive had to return the train to Cleveland, while two locomotives had to re-rail No. 4070.

== See also ==
- Canadian National 3254
- Grand Canyon Railway 4960
- Grand Trunk Western 5629
- Grand Trunk Western 6325
- Nickel Plate Road 587
- Southern Railway 4501

== Bibliography ==
- Johnson, Ronald (July 1980). "The Cuyahoga Valley Line". Railfan & Railroad. Vol. 3, no. 5. Carstens Publications. pp. 50–52.
