= Maine Central class S 2-8-2 =

Class of 32 American 2-8-2 locomotives

Maine Central class S
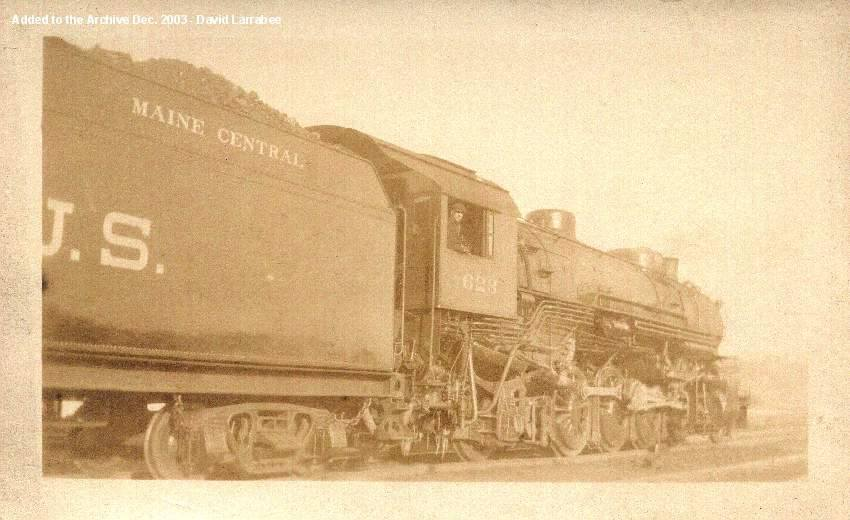
- USRA Light Mikado of sub-class S-1
Type and origin
- Power type: Steam
- Builder: ALCO
- Build date: 1914–1924
- Total produced: 32
Specifications
- Configuration
  - Whyte: 2-8-2
  - UIC: 1'D1'
- Gauge: 4 ft 8 1/2 in (1,435 mm)
- Leading dia.: 33 in (838 mm)
- Driver dia.: 63 in (1,600 mm)
- Trailing dia.: 44 in (1,118 mm)
- Wheelbase: 34 ft 9 in (10.59 m)
- Length: 77 ft 9 in (23.70 m) including tender
- Height: 14 ft 7 1/2 in (4.46 m)
- Loco weight: 275,000 lb (124.7 tonnes)
- Total weight: 431,000 lb (195.5 tonnes)
- Fuel type: Coal
- Fuel capacity: 14 t
- Water cap.: 8,000 US gal (30 m^{3})
- Firebox
  - Grate area: 56.5 sq ft (5.25 m^{2})
- Boiler pressure: 180 lbf/in^{2} (13 kg/cm^{2})
- Cylinders: Two
- Cylinder size: 26.5 in × 30 in (673 mm × 762 mm)
- Valve gear: Walschaerts
Performance figures
- Tractive effort: 51,200 lbf (227.7 kN)
Career
- Retired: 1953
- Disposition: All Scrapped

Maine Central Railroad Class S locomotives were intended for heavy freight service. They were of 2-8-2 wheel arrangement in the Whyte notation, or " 1'D1' " in UIC classification. They replaced earlier class W 2-8-0 locomotives beginning in 1914. They were the largest and most modern steam freight locomotives built for Maine Central; although former Boston and Maine Railroad 2-10-2s were later purchased to handle World War II freight traffic. Class S locomotives pulled freight trains over the main line between Portland and Bangor, Maine; and are best remembered for service on the Mountain Division from 1929, when the class X Mallet locomotives were scrapped, until replacement by diesel locomotives in the early 1950s.

== Sub-classes ==
All were built in American Locomotive Company's plant at Schenectady, New York and were numbered from 601 to 632 as delivered. Builders numbers 54571-54573 were delivered in 1914, 55020–55026 in 1915, 56502–56507 in 1916, and 57879–57882 in 1918. The United States Railroad Administration specified the USRA Light Mikado design for builders numbers 60933 through 60938 delivered in 1919. These six locomotives numbered 621 through 626 were designated sub-class S-1. The final six locomotives (builders numbers 65548–65553) delivered in 1924 returned to the original design with the addition of a booster engine which raised locomotive weight to 298,000 lb (135.2 tonnes). Booster engines raised tractive effort to 60,400 lbf (268.7 kN) and were subsequently added to engines 605, 606, 609, 611, 615, 616, and 626.

== Replacement ==
Class A 2-10-2s were numbered 651 through 658. When the Maine Central began purchasing diesel locomotives, EMD F3s were numbered in the 600 series reserved for main line freight locomotives.
