= Canadian National class S 2-8-2 =

Canadian locomotive class

Canadian National class S
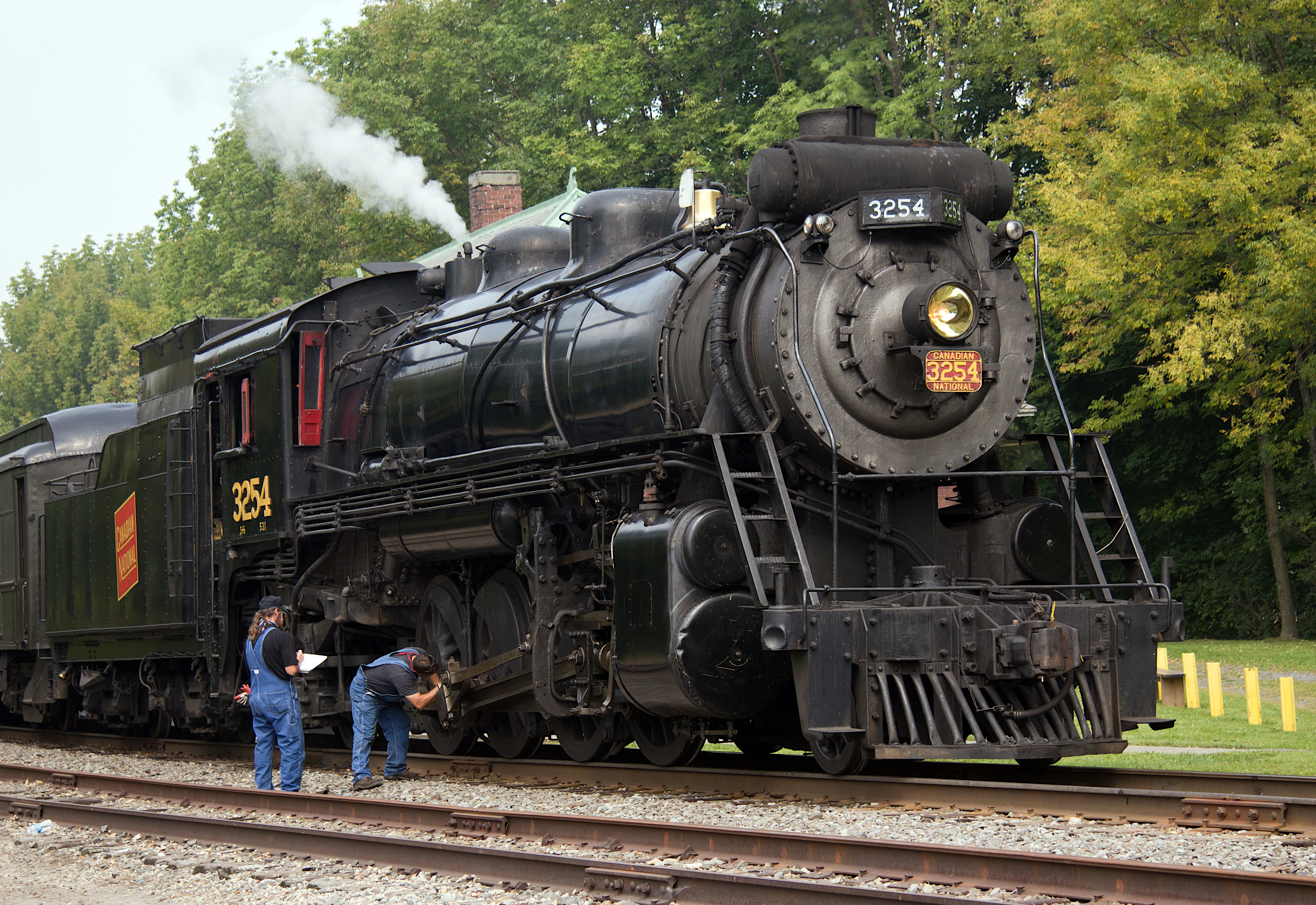
- CN 3254, an example of a preserved S class locomotive
Type and origin
- Power type: Steam
- Build date: 1913–1936
- Total produced: 466
Specifications
- Configuration
  - Whyte: 2-8-2
  - UIC: 1′D1′
- Gauge: 4 ft 8 1/2 in (1,435 mm)
- Leading dia.: 31 1/4 in (794 mm)
- Driver dia.: 63 in (1,600 mm)
- Trailing dia.: 43 in (1,090 mm)
- Wheelbase: 35 ft 1 in (10.69 m)
- Length: 78 ft 5 in (23.90 m) including tender
- Height: 14 ft 9 in (4.50 m)
- Fuel type: Coal
- Boiler pressure: 180 lbf/in^{2} (1.2 MPa)
- Cylinders: Two, outside
- Cylinder size: 27 in × 30 in (690 mm × 760 mm)
- Valve gear: Walschaerts
- Loco brake: 26L
- Train brakes: Air
- Couplers: Knuckle
Performance figures
- Tractive effort: 53,000 lbf (240 kN)
Career
- Operators: Grand Trunk Railway; Canadian Government Railways; Canadian National Railway; Gettysburg Railroad; Steamtown National Historic Site
- Numbers: 3563, 3254, 3377
- Retired: 1958–1961
- Preserved: 3
- Disposition: 3 preserved, 1 cannibalized, remainder scrapped

Canadian National Railway (CN) Class S locomotives is a Class of 2-8-2 wheel arrangement in the Whyte notation, or 1′D1′ in UIC classification. These locomotives were designed for 16° operating curvature. The first examples of this very successful class were built for the Grand Trunk Railway in 1913. Major purchases of the class continued through 1924. Sub-classes S-3 and S-4 employed higher pressure boilers with smaller diameter cylinders to achieve similar tractive effort with higher efficiency. The class remained in freight service until the final replacement of steam with diesel-electric locomotives. 53 were renumbered between 4045 and 4097 in 1956.

== Sub-classes ==
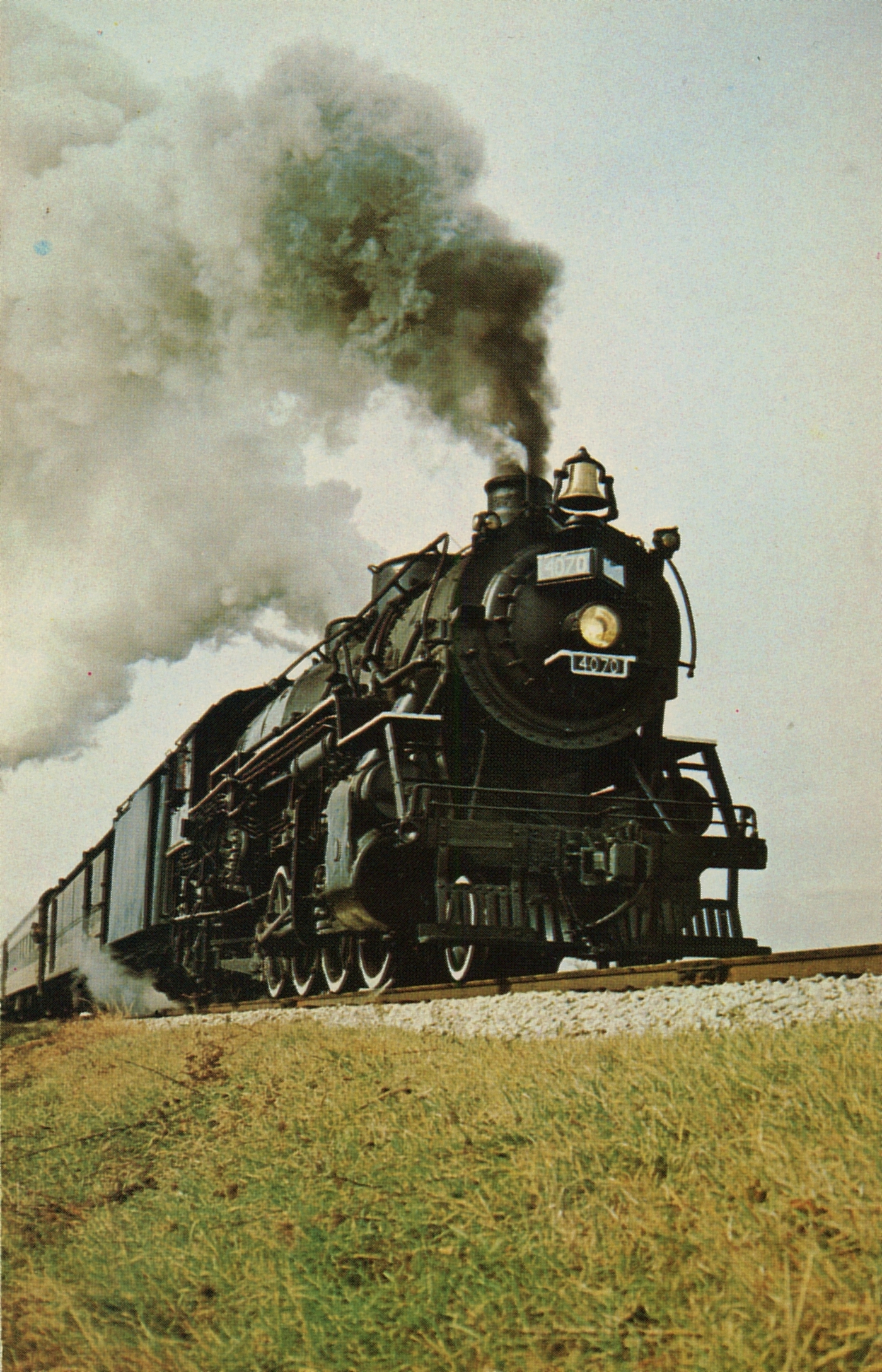
No. 4070, an example of a GTW S class, hauling a mainline excursion in November 1968

Note - sub-class letters as assigned by Canadian National. CN received the GT engines after the CGR engines, thus the later-built engines received lower sub-class letters.

Sub-class	Builder	Works numbers	Dates	CN numbers	Notes
S-1-a	CLC	1353–1402	1916–1917	3200–3249	50 built as CGR numbers 2800–2849 3239 preserved at the Canadian Railway Museum. Rest scrapped.
S-1-b	CLC	1459–1508	1917–1918	3250–3299	50 built as CGR numbers 2850–2899. 3254 preserved in Steamtown. Rest scrapped
S-1-c	MLW	58347–58376	1917	3300–3329	30 built as CGR numbers 2900–2929
S-1-d	CLC	1535–1594	1918–1919	3330–3389	60 built as CGR numbers 2930–2989. 3377 source parts for 3254. Rest scrapped
S-1-e	CLC	1673–1687	1920–1921	3390–3404	15 built
S-1-f	ALCO	52788–52812	1913	3405–3429	25 built as GT numbers 500–524
S-1-f	BLW	40210–40211; 40255–40258; 40269–40274; 40339–40342; 40365–40370; 40379–40381	1913	3430–3454	25 built as GT numbers 525–549
S-1-f	MLW	53920–53969	1913	3455–3504	50 built as GT numbers 550–599
S-1-g	CLC	1449–1458	1917	3505–3514	10 built as GT numbers 485–494
S-1-g	ALCO	59950–59954	1918	3515–3519	(Note: Numbers 3515–3517 and 3520–3523 were converted to 0-8-2 switchers in 1936 and 1937) 5 built as GT numbers 480–484
S-1-h	ALCO	58315–58319	1918	3520–3524	5 built as GT numbers 495–499
S-1-j	CN	53928, 53954	1926	3198–3199	(Note: Built in Canadian National Railway Pointe-Saint-Charles shops) 2 built
S-2-a	MLW	64475–64509	1923	3525–3559	35 built. 3538 was wrecked in 1950 Canoe River train crash, remainder scrapped.
S-2-b	CLC	1712–1721	1923	3560–3569	10 built
S-2-c	MLW	65633–65662	1924	3570–3599	30 built
S-3-a	ALCO	59563–59577; 60300–60324	1918	3700–3739	(Note: Boiler pressure increased to 200 lbf/in^{2} (1.4 MPa) and cylinder diameter reduced to 26 inches (660 mm).) 40 USRA Light Mikados built as GT numbers 440–479. 3734 preserved.
S-3-b	ALCO	64510–64517	1923	3740–3747	(Note: Ordered as GT numbers 600–607, but delivered to CN)8 built
S-3-c	ALCO	65317–65326	1924	3748–3757	10 built
S-4-a	CN	1623	1930	3800	(Note: Boiler pressure increased to 265 lbf/in^{2} (1.83 MPa) and cylinder diameter reduced to 24 inches (610 mm).) 1 built
S-4-b	CLC	1914–1918	1936	3801–3805	5 built

The S-1-g/h classes were rebuilt by the GTW as 0-8-2 locomotives, making them capable transfer and switching engines while also hosting an improved ride quality due to the trailing truck. Their ride quality was so good that crews would come to nickname them "the Queen Mary". They also had their valve gear swapped, the "g" and "h" subclasses receiving Baker and Young valve gear respectively.

== Preservation ==
No. 3239 was preserved by the Canadian Railroad Historical Association.

No. 3254 was saved by W. F. Barron of Ashland, Pennsylvania, United States. No. 3254 first operated in excursion service at the Gettysburg Railroad in Gettysburg and Mount Holly Springs from 1985 until being put into storage again in 1986, it was then sold to Steamtown National Historic Site in Scranton, where it ran from 1987 to 2012, when it was taken out of service indefinitely due to severe frame issues.

No. 3377 was first owned by the Edaville Railroad, but soon moved to Steamtown, and eventually became a source of spare parts for No. 3254.

No. 3734 (renumbered 4070) is now owned by the Midwestern Railway Preservation Society in the ex-Baltimore and Ohio Railroad roundhouse in Cleveland, Ohio, United States.
