= USRA Light Mikado =

Class of American two-cylinder 2-8-2 locomotives

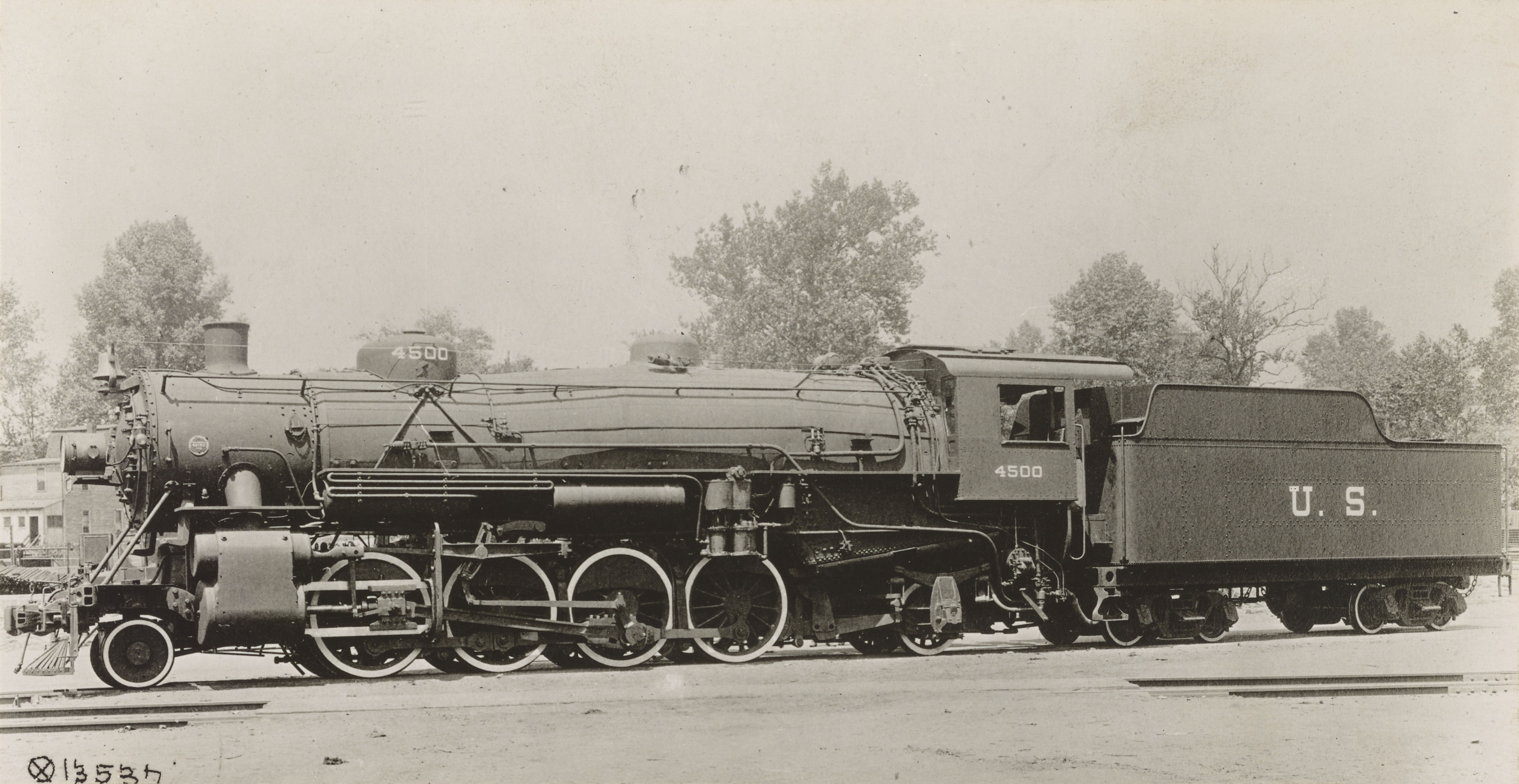
Type and origin
- Power type: Steam
- Builder: ALCO, Baldwin, Lima
- Build date: 1918-1929
- Total produced: 614 originals plus 641 copies
Specifications
- Configuration
  - Whyte: 2-8-2
  - UIC: 1′D1′ h2
- Gauge: 4 ft 8 1/2 in (1,435 mm) standard gauge
- Leading dia.: 33 in (0.838 m)
- Driver dia.: 63 in (1.600 m)
- Trailing dia.: 43 in (1.092 m)
- Wheelbase: locomotive: 36 ft 1 in (11.00 m) + tender: 71 ft 4 1/2 in (21.76 m)
- Adhesive weight: 220,000 lb (99,800 kg)
- Loco weight: 292,000 lb (132,000 kilograms; 132 metric tons)
- Tender weight: 185,400 lb (84,100 kilograms; 84.1 metric tons)
- Total weight: 477,400 lb (216,500 kilograms; 216.5 metric tons)
- Fuel type: Coal
- Fuel capacity: 16 t (15.7 long tons; 17.6 short tons)
- Water cap.: 10,000 US gal (38,000 L; 8,300 imp gal)
- Firebox
  - Grate area: 6.2 m^{2} (67 sq ft)
- Boiler pressure: 200 psi (1.38 MPa)
- Heating surface: 433.39 m^{2} (4,665.0 sq ft)
- Superheater
  - Heating area: 81.94 m^{2} (882.0 sq ft)
- Cylinders: Two
- Cylinder size: 26 in × 30 in (660 mm × 762 mm)
- Valve gear: Walschaerts
Performance figures
- Maximum speed: 65 mph (105 km/h)
- Power output: 2,991 hp (2,230 kW)
- Tractive effort: 54,724 lbf (243.42 kN)
Career
- Preserved: Six original and three copies preserved

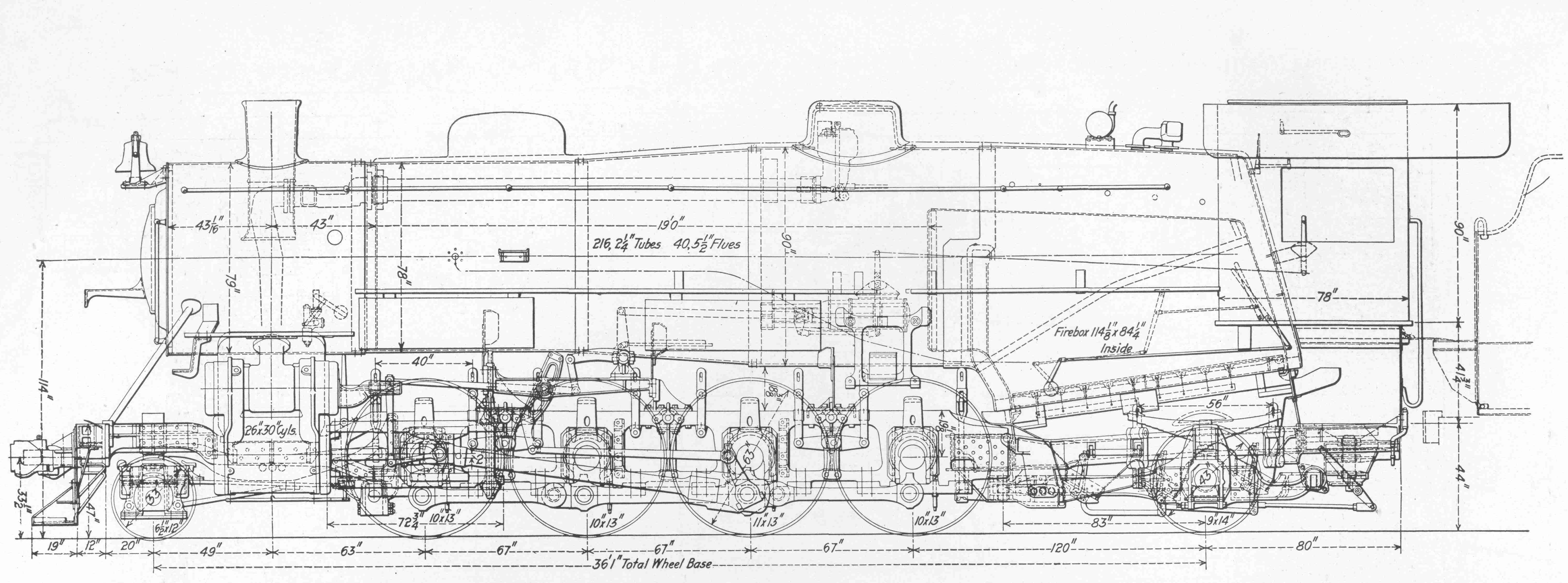
General arrangement drawing.

The USRA Light Mikado was a USRA standard class of steam locomotive designed under the control of the United States Railroad Administration, the nationalized railroad system in the United States during World War I. This was the standard light freight locomotive of the USRA types, and was of 2-8-2 wheel arrangement in the Whyte notation, or 1′D1′ in UIC classification. This wheel type was known as Mikado, after the Emperor of Japan.

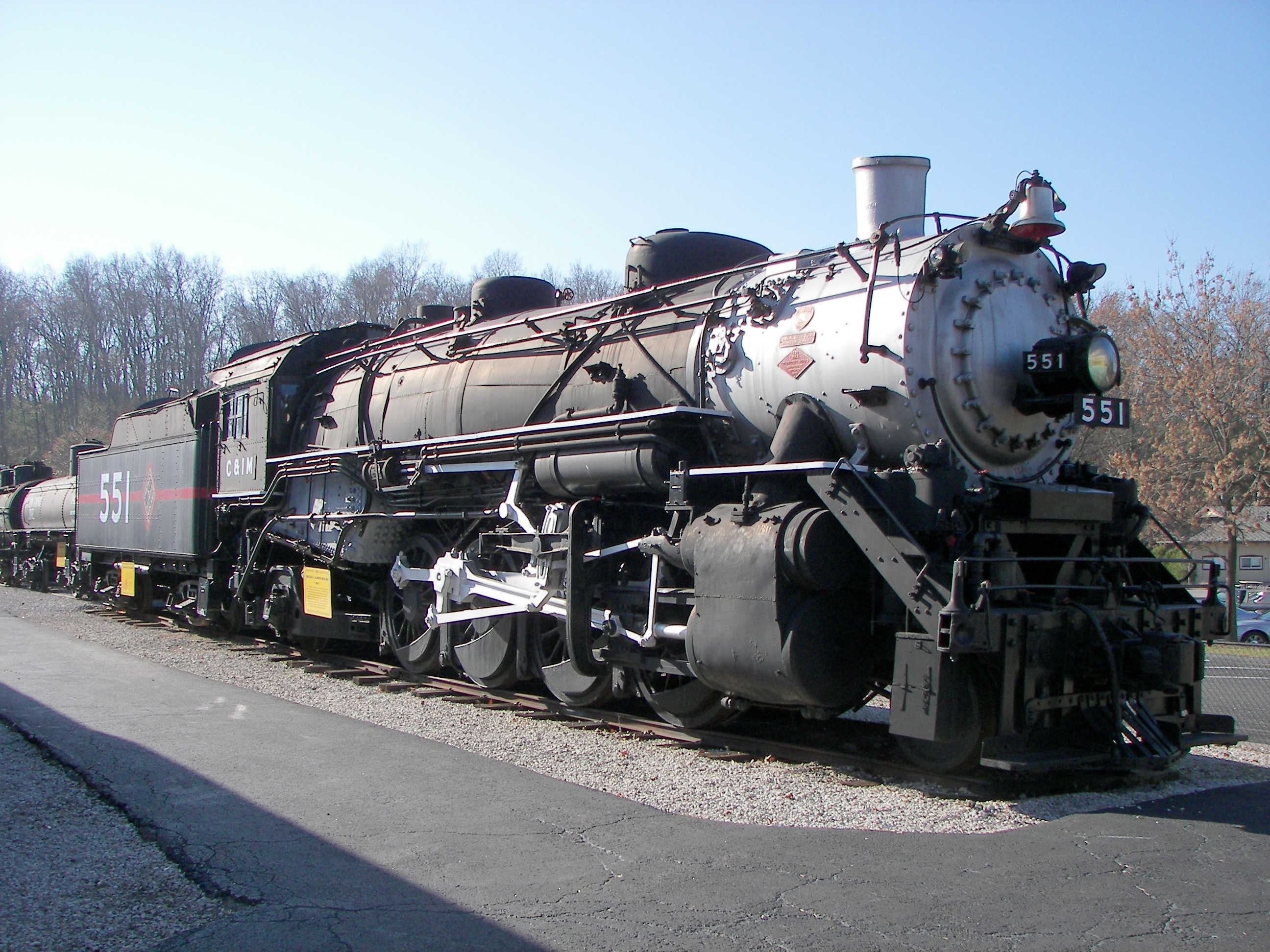
A USRA Light Mikado type locomotive donated to the National Museum of Transportation by the Chicago and Illinois Midland Railway

A total of 614 locomotives were built under the auspices of the USRA, with a further 641 copies built after the end of the USRA's control. The first, for the Baltimore and Ohio Railroad, was completed in July 1918 and given #4500. The locomotives were considered well designed and modern, and were popular and successful. Large numbers remained in service until replaced by diesel locomotives. It was also called the McAdoo Mikado after William Gibbs McAdoo, head of the USRA.

== Built ==
With later copies, over 50 railroads used the type, including the following:

Table of original USRA allocation
Railroad	Quantity	Class	Road numbers	Notes
Baltimore and Ohio Railroad	100	Q-3	4500–4599	Built 1918 by Baldwin. Scrapped 1959. 4500 preserved.
Chicago and Alton Railroad	10	L-4	875–884	Built 1918 by ALCO. To Alton Railroad 4385–4394, class Q-8. Scrapped 1941-1952
Chicago and Eastern Illinois Railroad	15	N-2	1925–1939	Built 1918 by ALCO-Schenectady. Scrapped 1942-1955.
Chicago Great Western Railway	10	L-3	750–759	Built 1918 by Baldwin. Scrapped 1944-1951.
Chicago, Indianapolis and Louisville Railroad ("Monon")	5	J-2	550–554	Built 1918 by ALCO-Schenectady. Scrapped 1947-1949
Chicago, Rock Island and Pacific Railroad	9 (+11 from T&P)	K-55	2300–2308, 2309–2319	Built 1919 by Baldwin And ALCO. Scrapped 1942-1945 and scrapped 1947-1951
Grand Trunk Railway	15	M-3	440–454	Built 1918 by ALCO to Canadian National Railway 3700–3714, class S-3-a. Scrapped 1958-1959.
Grand Trunk Western Railroad	25	M-3	455–479	Built 1918 by ALCO to Canadian National Railway 3715–3739, class S-3-a. Scrapped 1959-1960. 4070/3734 preserved
Lehigh and Hudson River Railway	4	80	80–83	Built 1918 by Baldwin. Scrapped 1942-1948.
Louisville and Nashville Railroad	18	J-3	1500–1517	Built 1919 by Lima. Scrapped 1951-1954.
Maine Central Railroad	6	S	621–626	Built 1919 by ALCO. Scrapped 1953.
Missouri Pacific Railroad	15 (+10 from PRR)	MK-63	1301–1315, 1316–1325	Built 1926 by ALCO-Brooks. Scrapped 1947-1950
Monongahela Railway	10	L1	170-179	Built 1919 by ALCO-Schenectady. Scrapped 1941-1949
Nashville, Chattanooga and St. Louis Railway	10	L2-55	650–659	Built 1918 by ALCO-Schenectady. All scrapped in 1951.
New York Central Railroad	95	H-6a	5100–5194	Built 1918-1919 by ALCO and Lima. Renumbered 1800–1894, less 11 to PM. Scrapped 1944-1955.
New York Central subsidiary Cleveland, Cincinnati, Chicago and St. Louis Railway	25	H-6a	6089–6113	Built 1918 by Baldwin. Renumbered 1700–1724. Scrapped 1944-1952.
New York Central subsidiary Indiana Harbor Belt Railroad	24	H-6a	400–423	Built 1918 by ALCO. 10 to SLSF, others to PM. Scrapped 1949-1950
New York Central subsidiary Lake Erie and Western Railroad	15	H-6o	5540–5554	Built 1918 by Baldwin. To Nickel Plate Road 586–600. Scrapped 1947-1957. 587 preserved.
New York Central subsidiary Michigan Central Railroad	20	H-6a	7970–7989	Built 1918 by ALCO. Renumbered 1770–1789. Scrapped 1947-1956
New York Central subsidiary Toledo and Ohio Central Railroad	15	H-6a	9732–9746	Built 1918 by ALCO. Renumbered 1732–1736. Scrapped 1945-1955
New York, Chicago and St. Louis Railway ("Nickel Plate Road")	10	H-6a	601–610	Built 1918 by ALCO. Scrapped 1940-1950
Pennsylvania Railroad	(33)	L2s	20006-20038	Built 1919 by ALCO. Refused; 10 to MP, 23 to SLSF. Scrapped 1948-1949
Pennsylvania Railroad subsidiary Grand Rapids and Indiana Railroad	5	L2s	108-112	Built 1919 renumbered PRR 9627-9631. Scrapped 1949-1953
Pere Marquette Railway	(30)	K-8	1011–1040	Built 1919-1920 by ALCO and Lima. Acquired secondhand from IHB (14), NYC (11) and WAB (5). To C&O 2350–2379 Scrapped 1952
Pittsburgh and West Virginia Railway	3	H6	1000-1002	Built 1918 by Baldwin. Scrapped 1949-1951
Rutland Railway	6	H-6a	32–37	Built 1918 by ALCO-Schenectady. Scrapped 1951-1952
Seaboard Air Line Railroad	10	Q-1	390–399	Built 1918 by ALCO. Renumbered 490-499 in 1925. Scrapped 1954-1957.
St. Louis – San Francisco Railway	(23 from PRR, 10 from IHB)	4000	4000–4032	Built 1919 by ALCO. Scrapped 1950-1951. 4003 and 4018 preserved.
Southern Railway	25	Ms-1	4750–4774	4765–4775. To subsidiary Cincinnati, New Orleans and Texas Pacific Railway. Renumbered 6285–6294 in 1920
Texas and Pacific Railway	(11)	H-1	550–560	Refused; to Chicago, Rock Island & Pacific.
Texas and Pacific Railway	11	H-2	800–810	Built by Baldwin in 1919
Union Pacific Railroad	20	MK-Spl	2295–2314	Renumbered 2480–2499 in 1920.
Union Pacific subsidiary Oregon Short Line Railroad	20	?	2535-2554	Built 1918 by Baldwin. Scrapped 1945-1953
Wabash Railroad	20	K-2	2201–2220	Built 1918 by ALCO. 5 to PM, replaced by 5 from WP Scrapped 1950-1955: Wabash
Western Pacific Railroad	5	MK-55	321–325	Built 1919 by Baldwin . Sold to Wabash in 1920. Scrapped 1949-1956
Totals	625			

=== Copies ===
Table of USRA copies
Railroad	Quantity	Class	Road numbers	Notes
Akron, Canton and Youngstown Railroad	7			
Atlantic Coast Line Railroad	74			
Canadian National Railway (Grand Trunk (Western))	18	S-3	3740-3757	
Chesapeake and Ohio Railway	3			
Chicago and Alton Railroad	5	L-4a	885–889	to Alton Railroad 4395–4399, class Q-8a
Chicago and Illinois Midland Railway	9			
Detroit and Toledo Shore Line Railroad	11			
Florida East Coast Railway	15	701	701–715	
Kansas, Oklahoma and Gulf Railway	1			
Louisville and Nashville Railroad	75	J-3	1518–1592	
Midland Valley Railroad	16			
Missouri Pacific subsidiary International-Great Northern Railroad	10	MK-63	1101–1110	
Mobile and Ohio Railroad	37	450	450–486	
Ferrocarriles Nacionales de México	56			
Nashville, Chattanooga and St. Louis Railway	12	L2A-55	660–671	
New York, Chicago and St. Louis Railway ("Nickel Plate Road")	61	H-6b–H-6f	611–671	
Oklahoma City-Ada-Atoka Railway	68			
Pere Marquette Railway	10	K-5	1041–1050	to C&O 1060–1069
Seaboard Air Line Railroad	118	Q-3	334–451	
Southern Railway subsidiary Alabama Great Southern Railroad	10	Ms-1	6612–6621	
West Point Route (Atlanta and West Point Rail Road)	3	F	425–427	
West Point Route (Georgia Railroad)	7	F	320–326	
West Point Route (Western Railway of Alabama)	4	F	375–378	
Total	641			

== Preservation ==
Nine USRA Light Mikados both originals and copies are preserved.

No.	Builder	Year built	Post-USRA owner	Location	Image	Disposition
4003	American Locomotive Company	1919	St. Louis-San Francisco Railroad	Fort Smith Trolley Museum		On Static Display
4018	Lima Locomotive Works	1919	St. Louis-San Francisco Railroad	Sloss Furnaces National Historic Landmark		On Static Display
587	Baldwin Locomotive Works	1918	New York, Chicago, and St. Louis Railroad	Ravenna, Kentucky		Stored, awaiting restoration
624	Lima Locomotive Works	1922	New York, Chicago, and St. Louis Railroad	Hammond, Indiana		On Static Display
639	Lima Locomotive Works	1923	New York, Chicago, and St. Louis Railroad	Miller Park (Bloomington, Illinois)		On Static Display
4500	Baldwin Locomotive Works	1918	Baltimore and Ohio Railroad	B&O Railroad Museum		On Static Display
4070	American Locomotive Company	1918	Grand Trunk Railway	Cleveland, Ohio		Undergoing Restoration
2537	American Locomotive Company	1918	Union Pacific Railroad	Walla Walla, Washington		On Static Display
551	Lima Locomotive Works	1928	Chicago & Illinois Midland Railroad	St. Louis Transportation Museum		On Static Display

== See also ==
- South Australian Railways 500 class (steam) A class of 10 broad gauge locomotives that use modified designs of the USRA Light Mikados.
- SNCF Class 141R A class of French steam locomotives that were ultimately derived from a modified version of the USRA Light Mikado.

== Bibliography ==
- Drury, George H. (1993), Guide to North American Steam Locomotives, Waukesha, Wisconsin: Kalmbach Publishing Company, ISBN 0-89024-206-2, LCCN 93041472
- Edson, William D.; Corley, Raymond F. "Locomotives of the Grand Trunk Railway". Railroad History (147). Boston, MA: The Railway and Locomotive Historical Society, Inc. ISSN 0090-7847.
