= Maine Central class M 2-6-0 =

Maine Central class M
Type and origin
- Power type: Steam
- Build date: 1890–1897
Specifications
- Configuration
  - Whyte: 2-6-0
  - UIC: 1'C
- Gauge: 4 ft 8 1/2 in (1,435 mm)
- Wheelbase: 46 ft 3 in (14.10 m) including tender
- Loco weight: 115,800 lb (52.5 tonnes)
- Total weight: 188,800 lb (85.6 tonnes)
- Fuel type: Coal
- Cylinders: Two
Performance figures
- Tractive effort: 20,200 lbf (89.9 kN)
Career
- Retired: 1946

Maine Central Railroad Class M locomotives were originally intended for heavy freight service. They were of 2-6-0 wheel arrangement in the Whyte notation, or "1'C" in UIC classification. They were replaced by class P 2-6-0 locomotives for the heaviest freight service beginning in 1896, and spent their final years as yard switcher locomotives. The oldest of the class surviving past United States Railroad Administration operation were Portland Company builders numbers 606 and 607 built in 1890. Eleven built by Schenectady Locomotive Works in 1893 and 1894 also appeared in the 221-245 number sequence on Maine Central's 1923 locomotive roster. The longest surviving representatives of the class were three built by "Schenectady" in 1897, as Portland and Rumford Falls Railway numbers 10 through 12. These three were rebuilt with higher-pressure boilers in Maine Central's Waterville shop between 1914 and 1921 as sub-class M-5. These reboilered locomotives with 25,000 lbf (111.2 kN) tractive effort were numbered 246 through 248. Number 247 was the last survivor of the class when scrapped in 1946.
