= Maine Central class P 2-6-0 =

Maine Central class P
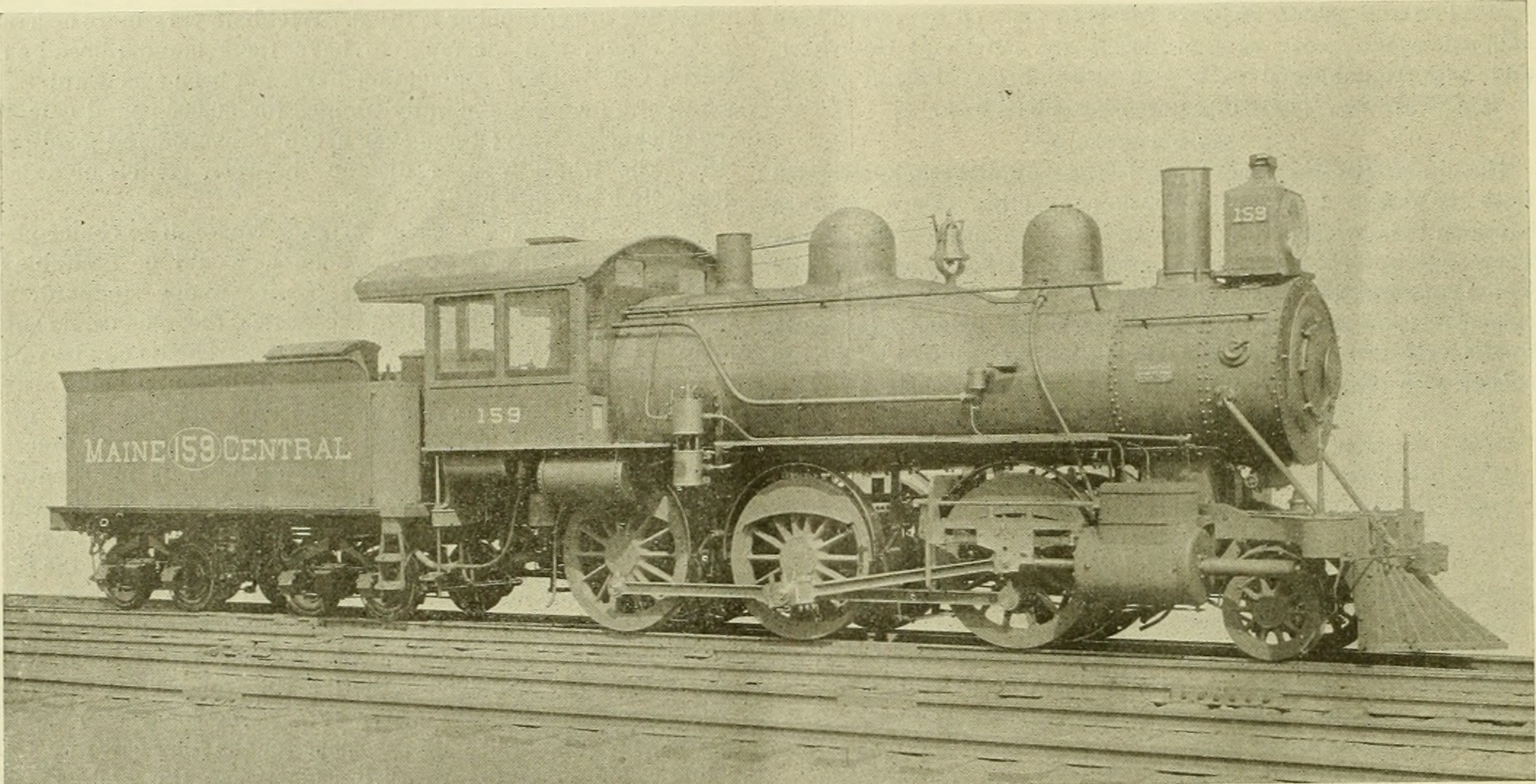
Type and origin
- Power type: Steam
- Build date: 1896–1902
- Total produced: 21
Specifications
- Configuration
  - Whyte: 2-6-0
  - UIC: 1'C
- Gauge: 4 ft 8 1/2 in (1,435 mm)
- Wheelbase: 47 ft 10 in (14.58 m) including tender
- Loco weight: 136,000 lb (61.7 tonnes)
- Total weight: 220,000 lb (99.8 tonnes)
- Fuel type: Coal
- Cylinders: Two
Performance figures
- Tractive effort: 24,000 lbf (106.8 kN)

Maine Central Railroad Class P locomotives were originally intended for heavy freight service. They were of 2-6-0 wheel arrangement in the Whyte notation, or "1'C" in UIC classification. They replaced class M 2-6-0s for the heaviest freight service beginning in 1896. They were transferred to branch line service as replaced by class O 4-6-0 locomotives beginning in 1903. Most were scrapped during the Great Depression and none survived World War II.

Class P locomotives were numbered from 301 to 321. Schenectady Locomotive Works delivered builders numbers 4471 through 4475 in 1896, 5151 and 5152 in 1899, and 5418, 5419, 5567, 5568 and 5674 through 5677 in 1900. American Locomotive Company produced the last six of the class at their Manchester plant in 1902. Builders numbers 25442 through 25445 were 7,600 lb (3.4 tonnes) heavier than the Schenectady locomotives and generated 1,300 lbf (5.8 kN) more tractive effort. Builders numbers 26307 and 26308 were built as Portland and Rumford Falls Railway (P&RF) numbers 13 and 14. The P&RF engines which became Maine Central numbers 320 and 321 were 21,000 lb (9.5 tonnes) heavier than the infobox specifications and generated 8,800 lbf (39.1 kN) more tractive effort. They also had larger tenders increasing total weight to 262,000 lb (118.8 tonnes).
