= Maine Central class O 4-6-0 =

Maine Central class O
Type and origin
- Power type: Steam
- Builder: Alco-Schenectady (13); Alco-Rhode Island (9); Baldwin Locomotive Works (10); Lima Locomotive Works (8)
- Build date: 1903–1923
- Total produced: 40
Specifications
- Configuration
  - Whyte: 4-6-0
  - UIC: 2′C
- Gauge: 4 ft 8 1/2 in (1,435 mm)
- Leading dia.: 33 in (838 mm)
- Driver dia.: 63 in (1,600 mm)
- Wheelbase: 26 ft 5 in (8.05 m)
- Length: 67 ft 9 in (20.65 m) including tender
- Height: 14 ft 7 1/2 in (4.46 m)
- Loco weight: 172,000 lb (78.0 tonnes)
- Total weight: 287,000 lb (130.2 tonnes)
- Fuel type: Coal
- Cylinders: Two
- Cylinder size: 21 in × 26 in (533 mm × 660 mm)
Performance figures
- Tractive effort: 31,000 lbf (137.9 kN)
Career
- Retired: 1949-1953
- Disposition: All Scrapped

Maine Central Railroad Class O locomotives were originally intended for heavy freight service. They were of 4-6-0 wheel arrangement in the Whyte notation, or "2'C" in UIC classification. They replaced earlier class P 2-6-0 locomotives beginning in 1903. They were in turn replaced by class W 2-8-0 locomotives for the heaviest freight service beginning in 1910, but remained in use on branch line trains until replaced by diesel locomotives after World War II. They proved so well-suited for branch line service the design was among the last steam locomotives built for the Maine Central.

== Original class O ==
Class O locomotives were numbered from 351 to 390 as delivered. The first were built in 1903 at the American Locomotive Company (ALCO) plant at Schenectady, New York with builders numbers 27657-27659 and 29029–29030. Builders numbers 30323-30326 and 38170-38173 followed in 1905. Schenectady-built locomotives were equipped with Stephenson valve gear.

=== Sub-class O-1 ===
Builders numbers 40576-40579 and 41235-41239 were assembled with Walschaerts valve gear in ALCO's Rhode Island plant in 1906.

=== Sub-class O-2 ===
Baldwin Locomotive Works built locomotives 373 through 382 with Walschaerts valve gear and weighing 8,000 lb (3.6 tonnes) more than the ALCO design. Builders numbers 32267, 32268, 32304, and 32344 were delivered in 1907; and 32395, 32428, 32566, 32575, 32644, and 32675 arrived in 1908.

=== Sub-class O-4 ===
Lima Locomotive Works built locomotives 383 through 390 with Baker valve gear in 1923. Builders numbers 6482 through 6489 were about the same weight as the Baldwin engines. The earlier engines had been equipped with short tenders suitable for branch line turntables. The Lima engines had a longer tender with capacity for 15 tons of coal and 6,500 US gal (25 m^{3}) of water. Older O class engines received larger tenders when larger locomotives were scrapped. Baldwin Locomotives 374 and 379 received tenders from class X Mallet locomotives. Locomotives with larger tenders were often used as helper engines.

== Replacement ==
When the Maine Central began purchasing diesel locomotives, switchers intended for branch line use were numbered in the 300 series reserved for the O class. EMD SW7s and SW9s were numbered 331 through 335; and ALCO S-2s and S-4s were numbered 301-303 and 311–317.

== Big O passenger locomotives ==
Sub-class O-3 locomotives numbered 401 through 412 are not included in the infobox totals.

Although they shared the 4-6-0 wheel arrangement, the number sequence reveals a different use. These were main line passenger engines built for Maine Central during the period of United States Railroad Administration (USRA) control.

USRA authorised construction of a non-standard 4-6-0, because Maine Central C class 4-6-2s were smaller than USRA Light Pacifics.

ALCO completed builders numbers 59050 through 59057 in 1918, and 62051 through 62054 in 1920. These 206,500 lb (93.7 tonnes) locomotives used 190 lbf/in^{2} (1.31 MPa) steam in 22 in × 28 in (559 mm × 711 mm) cylinders, through 67 in (1,702 mm) drivers to achieve 32,700 lbf (145.5 kN) tractive effort.
