= Maine Central class W 2-8-0 =

Maine Central class W
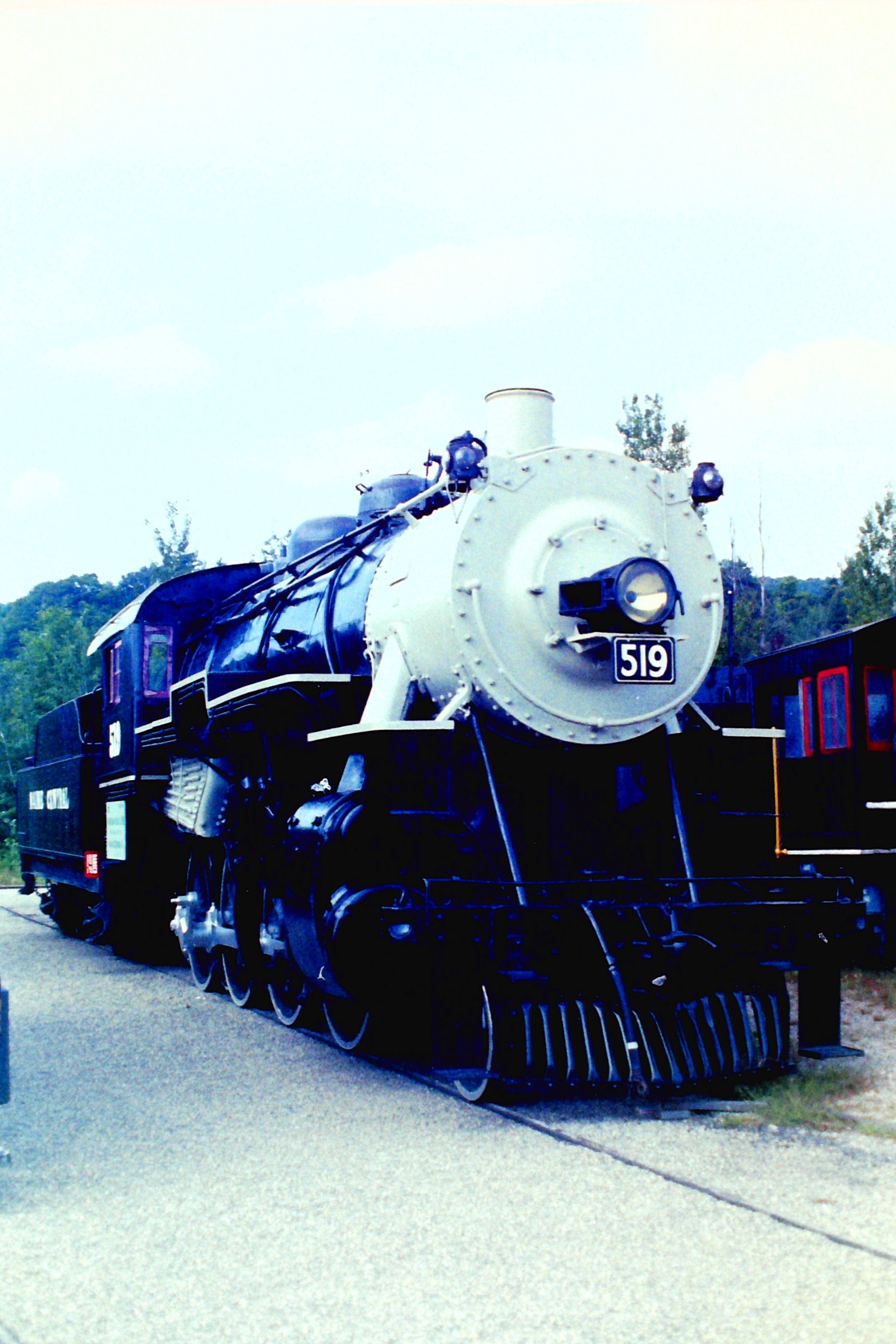
- Maine Central No. 519
Type and origin
- Power type: Steam
- Builder: ALCO
- Build date: 1910–1914
- Total produced: 28
Specifications
- Configuration
  - Whyte: 2-8-0
  - UIC: 1'D
- Gauge: 4 ft 8 1/2 in (1,435 mm)
- Leading dia.: 33 in (838 mm)
- Driver dia.: 63 in (1,600 mm)
- Wheelbase: 25 ft 6 in (7.77 m)
- Length: 71 ft 4 in (21.74 m) including tender
- Height: 14 ft 8 1/4 in (4.48 m)
- Loco weight: 198,000 lb (89.8 tonnes)
- Total weight: 338,000 lb (153.3 tonnes)
- Fuel type: Coal
- Fuel capacity: 12 t
- Water cap.: 7,000 US gal (26 m^{3})
- Firebox
  - Grate area: 50.2 sq ft (4.66 m^{2})
- Boiler pressure: 185 lbf/in^{2} (13.0 kg/cm^{2})
- Cylinders: Two, outside
- Cylinder size: 23 in × 28 in (584 mm × 711 mm)
- Valve gear: Walschaerts
Performance figures
- Tractive effort: 37,000 lbf (164.6 kN)
Career
- Operators: Maine Central Railroad
- Retired: 1954
- Preserved: 2 (Remainder Scrapped)
- Disposition: No. 501, under restoration

Maine Central Railroad Class W locomotives were intended for heavy freight service. They were of 2-8-0 wheel arrangement in the Whyte notation, or "1'D" in UIC classification. They replaced earlier class O 4-6-0 locomotives beginning in 1910. They were in turn replaced by class S 2-8-2 locomotives for the heaviest freight service beginning in 1914, but remained in use on lighter freight trains until replaced by diesel locomotives after World War II.

== Sub-classes ==
All were built in American Locomotive Company's plant at Schenectady, New York. The first nine built in 1910 (builders numbers 47732-47736 & 49207-49210) were 5,000 pounds (2,300 kg) lighter than the infobox figure. Sub-class W-1 consisted of seven locomotives added in 1912 (builders numbers 50933-50939) and eight more (builders numbers 52989-52996) delivered in 1913. The last four designated sub-class W-2 (builders numbers 54564-54567) were delivered in 1914 and were 4,000 pounds (1,800 kg) heavier than the infobox figure.

== Preservation ==
Class W locomotives were numbered from 501 to 528 as delivered. Numbers 501 and 519 were officially property of the European and North American Railway (E&NA) as a condition of the lease of that company by the Maine Central Railroad. They therefore avoided scrapping until Maine Central purchased E&NA to remove the lease obligation in 1955. Two locomotives survived; No. 501 is currently under restoration to operating condition at the Conway Scenic Railroad and No. 519 was on display outside at the Steamtown National Historic Site, exposed to the elements.

== Replacement ==
When the Maine Central began purchasing diesel locomotives, road switchers were numbered in the 500 series previously reserved for the W class. ALCO RS-2s and ALCO RS-3s were numbered 551 through 557, and EMD GP7s were numbered 561 through 569 and 571 through 581.
