= Canadian National 3377 =

Preserved Canadian 2-8-2 locomotive (CN S-1-d class)

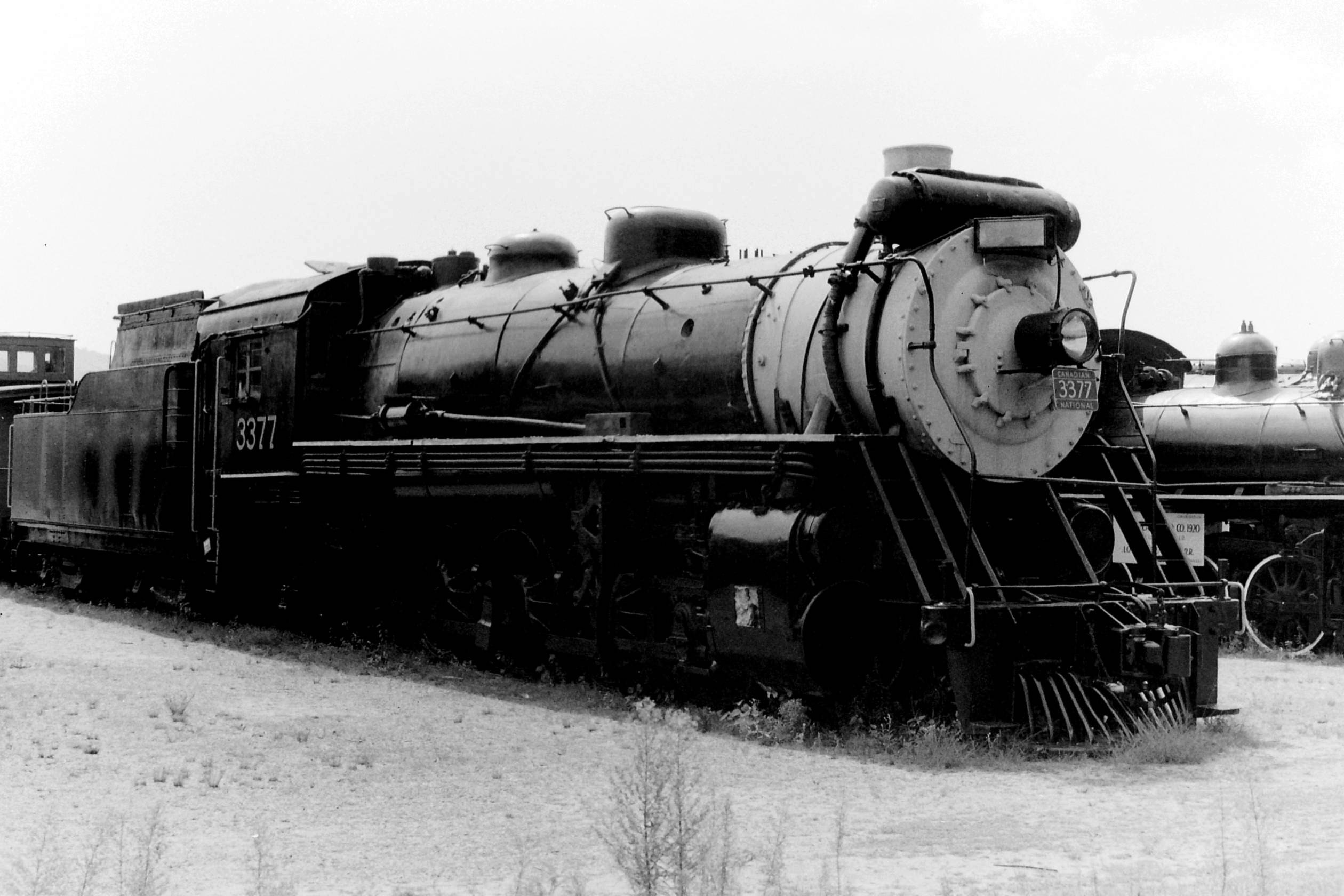
- No. 3377 on static display at Steamtown, U.S.A., in Bellows Falls, Vermont, US, in August 1970
Type and origin
- Power type: Steam
- Builder: Canadian Locomotive Company
- Serial number: 1582
- Build date: 1919
Specifications
- Configuration
  - Whyte: 2-8-2
  - UIC: 1′D1′ h
- Gauge: 4 ft 8 1/2 in (1,435 mm)
- Driver dia.: 63 in (1.600 m)
- Fuel type: Coal
- Boiler pressure: 180 lbf/in^{2} (1.24 MPa)
- Feedwater heater: Elesco
- Cylinders: Two, outside
- Cylinder size: 27 in × 30 in (686 mm × 762 mm)
- Valve gear: Walschaerts
- Valve type: Piston valves
- Loco brake: 26L
- Train brakes: Air
- Couplers: Knuckle
Performance figures
- Tractive effort: 53,115 lbf (236.27 kN)
- Factor of adh.: 3.95
Career
- Operators: Canadian Government Railways; Canadian National Railway
- Class: S-1-d
- Numbers: CGR 2977; CN 3377
- Retired: 1961
- Preserved: September 1961 (revenue preservation)
- Restored: 1981 (cosmetically)
- Current owner: Steamtown National Historic Site
- Disposition: On static display, awaiting possible restoration

Canadian National 3377 is a preserved S-1-d class 2-8-2 "Mikado" type steam locomotive currently on display at the Steamtown National Historic Site (NHS) in Scranton, Pennsylvania, United States.

== History ==
Canadian National 3377 was built in 1919 by the Canadian Locomotive Company (CLC) for the Canadian Government Railways (CGR) where it was originally numbered No. 2977. It was later renumbered to 3377 and would spend the rest of its career operating on the Canadian National Railway (CN). It was eventually retired from revenue service in 1961.

The locomotive was sold to the Edaville Railroad (ER) in September 1961, and then was later moved to Bellows Falls, Vermont and became part of the Steamtown, U.S.A. collection. No. 3377 was the target of copper thieves during its trip to Steamtown; it was never repaired and has been cannibalized for parts for Steamtown's operating Canadian National 2-8-2, No. 3254, including the tender, which helped replace 3254's original tender that was scrapped in 2010 due to rust leaks. As of 2026, the locomotive continues to sit on static display south of the Steamtown shops.

== 1941 head-on collision ==
On July 24, 1941, No. 3377 was pulling the second section of CN's Transcontinental passenger train out of New Westminster, British Columbia and onto a single-track line in the Brunette Valley at less than 25 miles per hour (40 km/h), and then at 9:42 am, it collided head-on with a Great Northern Railway (GN) passenger train, led by 4-6-2 locomotive No. 1351. Local experts believed that the GN No. 1351 crew, who were new to their jobs at the time, have accidentally caused the collision; they were ordered to stop at a siding to wait for the second section of the Transcontinental—No. 3377's train—to pass before proceeding on the single-track shared by CN and GN, but when the first section of the Transcontinental passed, the engineer allegedly mistook it as the train they were supposed to wait for and proceeded too early.

No. 3377 and its tender jackknifed onto their sides, and the locomotive was severely damaged upon impact, with the cylinder blocks being ripped away from the frame and the piston rods being twisted upwards, and a wooden baggage car directly behind it was crushed. The locomotive also began to engulf in flames, and when fire fighters arrived at the scene, they had to use chemical equipment to put the fire out. No. 3377 engineer Herbert H. Mills and fireman Tillinger were both severely injured, as was No. 1351 engineer John Caray. No. 1351 fireman A. Hager and CN baggage man Harold H. Krinks—who was inside the wooden baggage car—were killed upon impact, while twenty-one passengers and crew members received minor injuries.

Many people arrived at the scene to help bring the injured passengers and crew to safety, and a second mainline was temporarily built to clear the wreckage. Despite being badly damaged following the accident, CN rebuilt the No. 3377 with numerous patches at the front of its frame, and then it continued to run in revenue service.
