= St. Louis–San Francisco 4003 =

Preserved American 2-8-2 locomotive

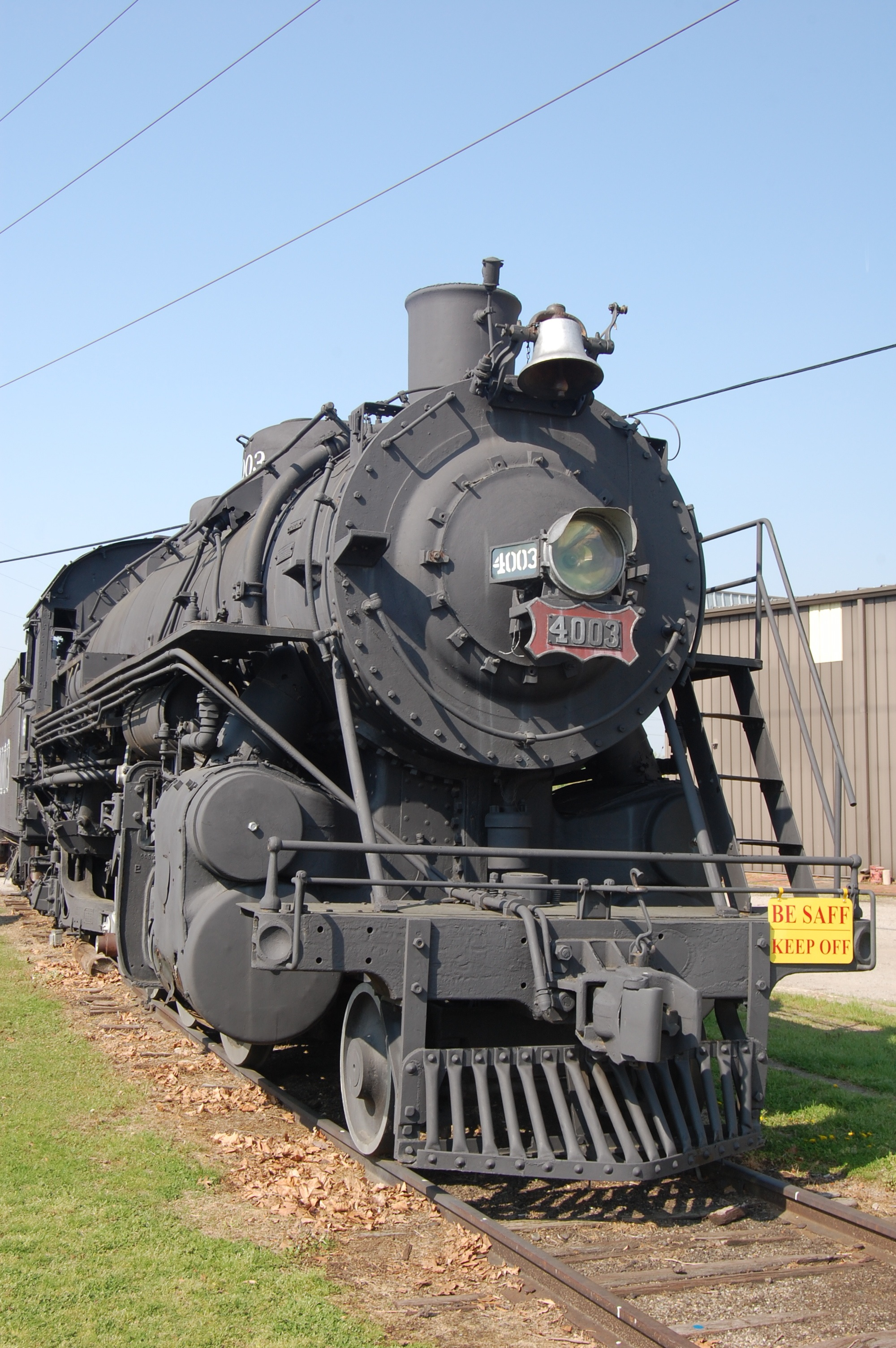
- Frisco 4003 in 2008.
Type and origin
- Power type: Steam
- Builder: American Locomotive Company
- Serial number: 60946
- Model: USRA Light Mikado
- Build date: October 1919
Specifications
- Configuration
  - Whyte: 2-8-2
- Gauge: 4 ft 8 1/2 in (1,435 mm)
- Leading dia.: 33 in (838 mm)
- Driver dia.: 63 in (1,600 mm)
- Trailing dia.: 44 in (1,118 mm)
- Wheelbase: 36.9 ft (11 m)
- Width: 10.0 ft (3.0 m)
- Height: 15.1 ft (4.6 m)
- Axle load: 60,100 lb (27 t)
- Adhesive weight: 228,400 lb (104 t)
- Loco weight: 305,424 lb (139 t)
- Tender weight: 189,400 lb (86 t)
- Total weight: 494,824 lb (224 t)
- Fuel type: Coal
- Water cap.: 10,000 US gal (37,854 L)
- Tender cap.: 18 short tons (16 t)
- Firebox
  - Grate area: 67 sq ft (6 m^{2})
- Boiler: 90 in (2,286 mm)
- Boiler pressure: 200 psi (1 MPa)
- Heating surface
  - Firebox: 380 sq ft (35 m^{2})
  - Flues: 3,441 sq ft (320 m^{2})
  - Tubes and flues: 3,821 sq ft (355 m^{2})
  - Total surface: 4,714 sq ft (438 m^{2})
- Superheater
  - Type: Schmidt
  - Heating area: 882 sq ft (82 m^{2})
- Cylinders: Two, outside
- Cylinder size: 26 in × 30 in (660 mm × 762 mm)
- Valve gear: Walschaerts
- Valve type: Piston valves
- Loco brake: Air
- Train brakes: Air
- Couplers: Knuckle
Performance figures
- Tractive effort: 54,700 lbf (243 kN)
- Factor of adh.: 4.17
Career
- Operators: St. Louis–San Francisco Railway
- Number in class: Lima Locomotive Works: 30; ALCO 3 (#4002, 4003, 4005)
- Numbers: StLSF 4000; StLSF 4032
- Axle load class: 51
- Retired: 1952
- Preserved: 1954
- Current owner: Fort Smith Trolley Museum
- Disposition: On static display
- St. Louis San Francisco (Frisco) Railway Steam Locomotive #4003
- U.S. National Register of Historic Places
- Location within Arkansas Location within the United States
- Location: 100 S 4th St., Fort Smith, Arkansas
- Coordinates: 35°23′7″N 94°25′47″W
- Area: less than one acre
- Built: 1919
- Architect: American Locomotive Company
- NRHP reference No.: 04000500
- Added to NRHP: July 12, 2004

St. Louis–San Francisco 4003 is a 2-8-2 "Mikado" type steam locomotive built by the American Locomotive Company in October 1919 as a standard USRA Light Mikado for the Pennsylvania Railroad. The PRR, for unknown reasons, rejected 33 of 38 locomotives in the order. The United States Railroad Administration reassigned 23 of them (road numbers 4000-4007 and 4017-4031) to the St. Louis–San Francisco Railway (SLSF), also known as the "Frisco". The Frisco also received 10 sisters from the Indiana Harbor Belt Railroad (road numbers 4008-4016 and 4032), making 33 in all. The locomotive is now on display at the Fort Smith Trolley Museum in Fort Smith, Arkansas.

== The USRA Designs ==
The railroads of the United States were nationalized during World War I, from December, 1917 to March, 1920. As part of this, locomotives built during the period were one of the twelve USRA standard designs, which included the Light Mikado. 4003 was one of 625 built by the USRA; another 641 were built after the USRA era, making it one of the most numerous single locomotive designs of all time. After Frisco received the Mikados, it modified them with boosters on the trailing trucks and raised cab roofs for more headroom.

== History ==
No. 4003 was one of three of the class built by ALCO at its Schenectady Locomotive Works in late summer 1919. The balance of the class was built by Lima. It cost $53,619.

The Frisco put it into service hauling freight between Fort Smith, Arkansas and Monett, Missouri, which included a stretch through the Boston Mountains that was relatively steep. Two major sources of carloads were berries, a million quarts shipped in 1941, and zinc, which was smelted in Fort Smith.

Like all the other US railroads, the Frisco actively began converting to diesel power in the late forties. 4003 was retired in early 1952, shortly before the last steam powered train on the Frisco, between Birmingham and Bessemer, Alabama in February. Frisco kept the locomotive until 1954 when it donated it to the City of Fort Smith. The city placed it on display in Kay Rodgers Park where it remained for almost 50 years. Early in this century, the city transferred the locomotive to the Fort Smith Trolley Museum with the provision that the museum pay for the moving. It now sits outside at the museum. While it could probably be restored to operating condition, the museum has no track on which to run it and the restoration cost would be considerable.

The locomotive was added to the National Register of Historic Places in 2004 as 'St. Louis San Francisco (Frisco) Railway Steam Locomotive #4003'.

== Gallery ==
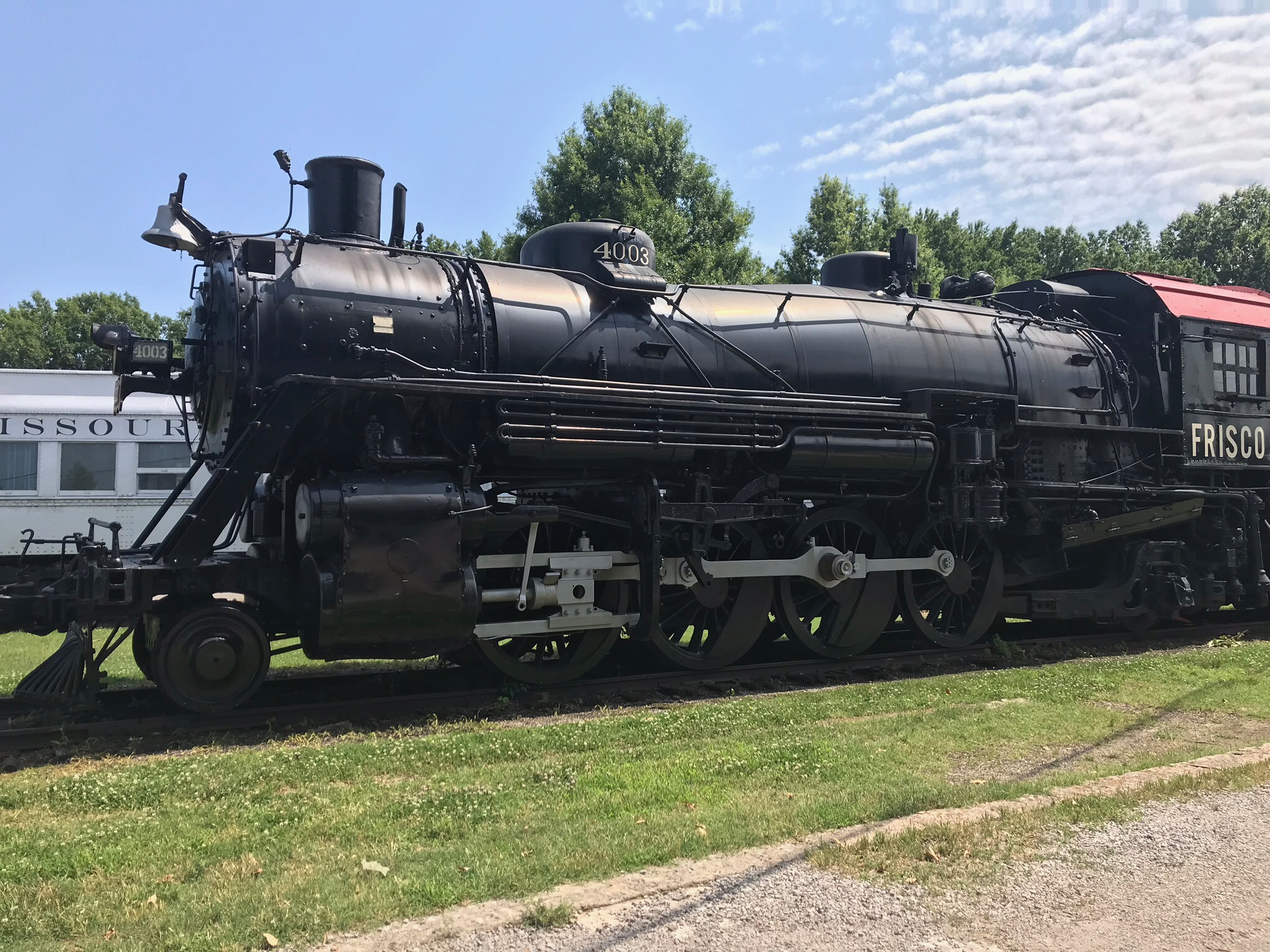
Frisco 4003 in May of 2019

== See also ==
- National Register of Historic Places listings in Sebastian County, Arkansas
