= Canadian National 3254 =

Preserved Canadian 2-8-2 steam locomotive (CN S-1-b class)

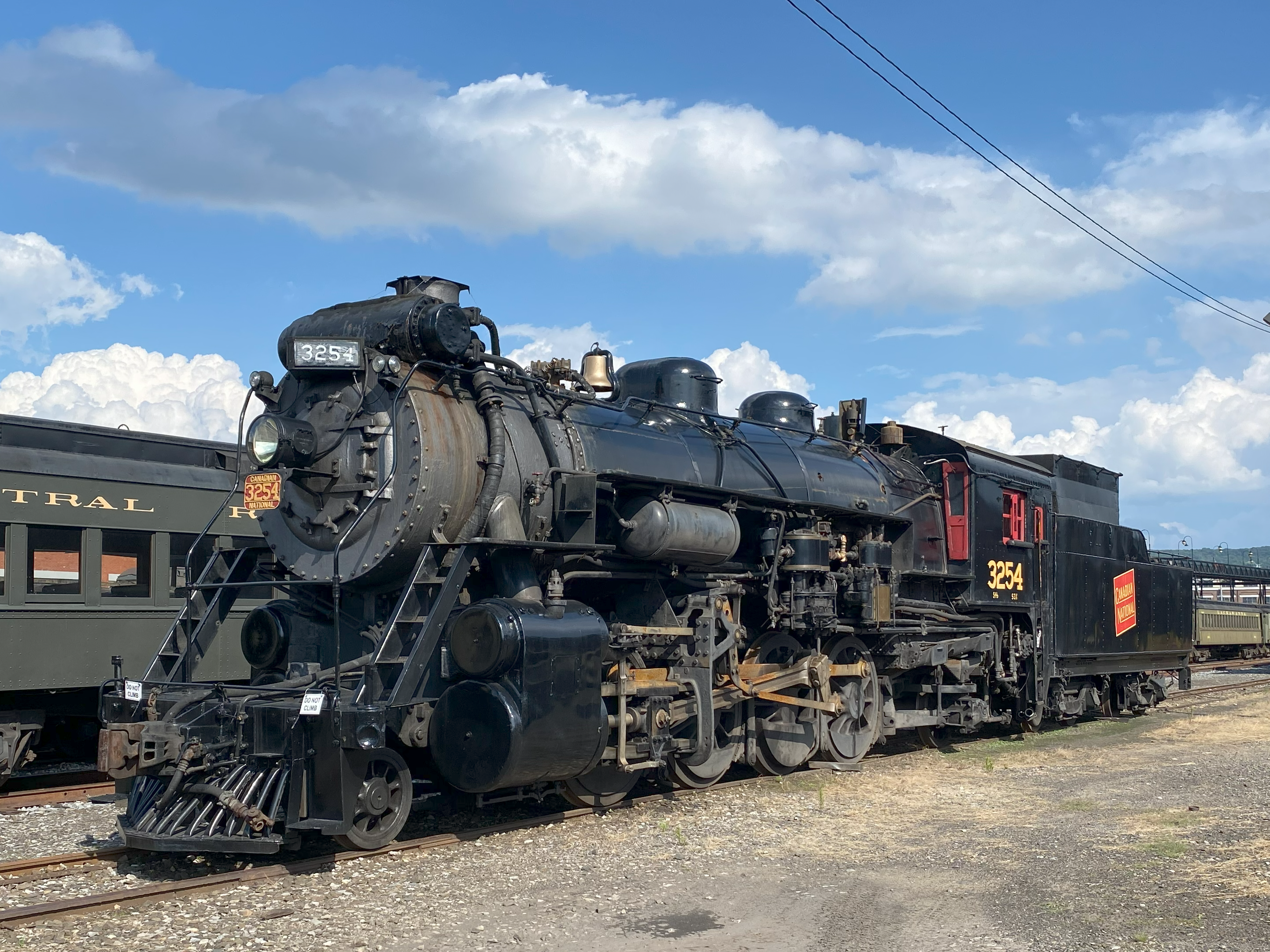
- CN No. 3254 on static display in the yard, August 2023
Type and origin
- Power type: Steam
- Builder: Canadian Locomotive Company
- Serial number: 1463
- Model: S-1-b
- Build date: May 1917
Specifications
- Configuration
  - Whyte: 2-8-2
  - UIC: 1′D1′ h2
- Gauge: 4 ft 8 1/2 in (1,435 mm)
- Driver dia.: 63 in (1,600 mm)
- Adhesive weight: 209,970 lb (95.2 tonnes)
- Loco weight: 277,550 lb (125.9 tonnes)
- Tender weight: 167,250 lb (75.9 tonnes)
- Total weight: 444,800 lb (201.8 tonnes)
- Fuel type: Coal
- Fuel capacity: 12 long tons (12 t)
- Water cap.: 7,500 imp gal (34,000 L; 9,000 US gal)
- Boiler pressure: 180 lbf/in^{2} (1.24 MPa)
- Feedwater heater: Elesco
- Cylinders: Two, outside
- Cylinder size: 27 in × 30 in (686 mm × 762 mm)
- Valve gear: Walschaerts
- Valve type: Piston valves
- Loco brake: 26L
- Train brakes: Air
- Couplers: Knuckle
Performance figures
- Tractive effort: 53,115 lbf (236.27 kN)
- Factor of adh.: 3.95
Career
- Operators: Canadian Government Railways; Grand Trunk Railway (leased); Canadian National Railway; Gettysburg Railroad; Steamtown National Historic Site
- Class: S-1-b
- Numbers: CGR 2854; CN 3254; GRR 3254; DLW 1271
- Last run: December 1957
- Retired: February 1958 (revenue service); December 2, 2012 (excursion service)
- Preserved: November 1961
- Restored: 1985
- Current owner: Steamtown National Historic Site
- Disposition: On static display

Canadian National 3254 is a S-1-b class 2-8-2 "Mikado" type steam locomotive built in 1917 by the Canadian Locomotive Company (CLC) for the Canadian National Railway (CN) as the fifth member of the Canadian National class S-1-b.

== History ==
=== Revenue service ===
No. 3254 was built in May 1917 by the Canadian Locomotive Company (CLC) for the Canadian Government Railways (CGR) where it was originally numbered as No. 2854. On September 6, 1918, the Canadian Government Railways was merged with the Canadian Northern Railway (CN) to create the Canadian National Railway. During a subsequent renumbering process within the locomotive fleet, No. 2854 was renumbered to No. 3254 in March 1919. The locomotive had considerable pulling power, could climb grades without incident, and was used to pull heavy freight trains. The locomotive made its final run in December 1957. In February 1958, it received its last major class 3 overhaul in Allendale, Ontario, at the Allendale shops and was put into stored at Foleyet, Ontario, officially being retired from revenue service.

=== Preservation ===
After being stored for three years, No. 3254 was sold in November 1961 to motel owner Willis F. Barron, who moved it to a Reading Company (RDG) station in Ashland, Pennsylvania. Barron had intentions to run the locomotive on the former RDG branchline that served the town, but rails were ripped up before Barron's planned venture could begin operation. He had No. 3254 disassembled, moved via truck, and reassembled at his Ashland Court Motel for static display in front of a New Haven passenger coach. During the 1970s, Barron lost interest in restoring No. 3254 to operating condition, so it was sold to the Adirondack Railroad in Lake Placid, New York, but was never delivered.

=== Gettysburg Railroad ===
In 1982, it was sold again to the Gettysburg Railroad (GETY), and they disassembled it to be hauled by truck to Gettysburg. It was subsequently reassembled and restored to operating condition in 1985, and it began pulling excursion trains between Gettysburg and Mount Holly Springs. It also participated in that year's National Railway Historical Society (NRHS) convention alongside Huntingdon and Broad Top Mountain Railroad 2-8-0 No. 38. During its time at Gettysburg, however, the locomotive proved to be oversized and overpowered for the railroad's needs, so it only operated there for a year and a half until it was pulled from service and put into storage in 1986.

=== Steamtown National Historic Site ===
Simultaneously, Steamtown, U.S.A. needed a larger locomotive to meet the demand for greater motive power to pull their longer excursion trains, and they needed a second operable steam locomotive for their grand reopening of 1987. In June 1987, the Gettysburg Railroad agreed to trade No. 3254, in exchange for Canadian Pacific 1278 and $100,000. No. 3254 was repainted as Delaware, Lackawanna and Western (DLW) No. 1271, and on June 14, it moved under its own power from Gettysburg to Harrisburg to Steamtown's location in Scranton. After the National Park Service (NPS) acquired Steamtown, which was consequently renamed as Steamtown National Historic Site, No. 3254 was reverted to its CN appearance. In 1995, the locomotive participated in the grand opening of Steamtown's main roundhouse alongside multiple other locomotives, including Canadian Pacific 2317, Baldwin Locomotive Works 26, Reading Blue Mountain and Northern Railroad 425, New York, Susquehanna and Western 142, and Milwaukee Road 261.

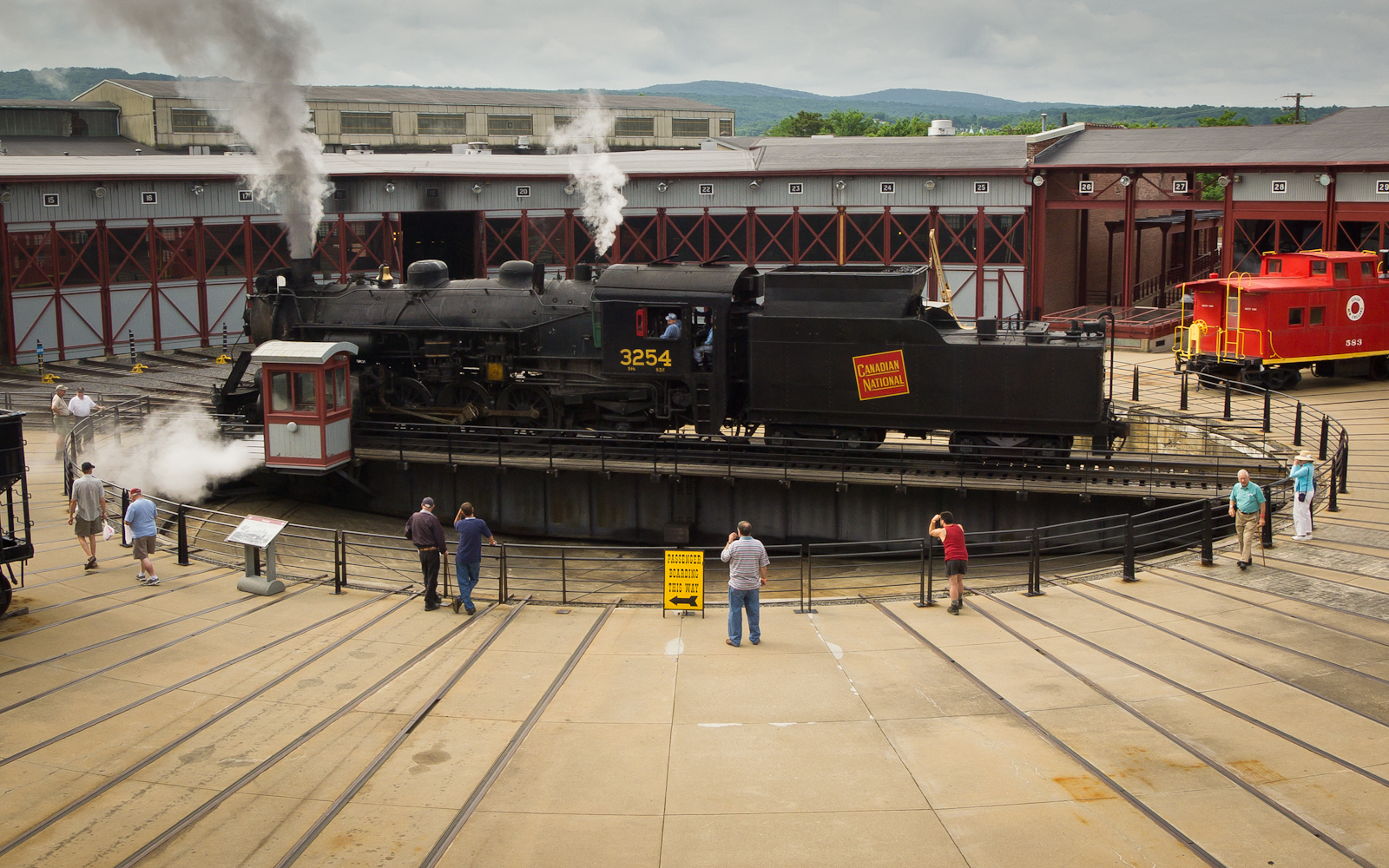
No, 3254 being turned on the Steamtown turntable, on June 26, 2011

Steamtown also owns Canadian National 3377, which became a spare parts provider for the locomotive. The tender from No. 3377 replaced No. 3254's original tender in 2010 due to rust leaks; the original tender would later be scrapped. Upon No. 2317's removal from service in September 2010, No. 3254 remained as Steamtown's only operating steam locomotive for two years. As a result of issues with either the boiler/firebox or the frame, combined with other needed maintenance which made further operation impractical, the locomotive made its last run on December 2, 2012. It was taken out of service after the 2012 holiday season, and it was subsequently awaiting its 1,472 day inspection and rebuild as required by the Federal Railroad Administration (FRA). Steamtown later decided to officially retire it from excursion service indefinitely due to its poor condition. The early retirement is likely attributed due to its bent frame from being shipped via truck sometime during its preservation period. It has frequently been described as a "rough rider," and had been chewing up bearings at an accelerated rate. It also consumed a staggering amount of coal compared to the amount consumed by Canadian Pacific 2317.

As of 2026, No. 3254 still remains on static display, with no plans on returning to service anytime soon, due to its poor condition and bent frame. Boston and Maine 3713 will be replacing both No. 3254 and No. 2317 as Steamtown's main line excursion locomotive once restored to operation.

== See also ==
- Canadian National 89
- Canadian National 7470
- Grand Trunk Western 4070
