= Indiana Transportation Museum =

Former railroad museum in Logansport, Indiana, U.S.

Coordinates: 40°03′26″N 86°1′09.38″W

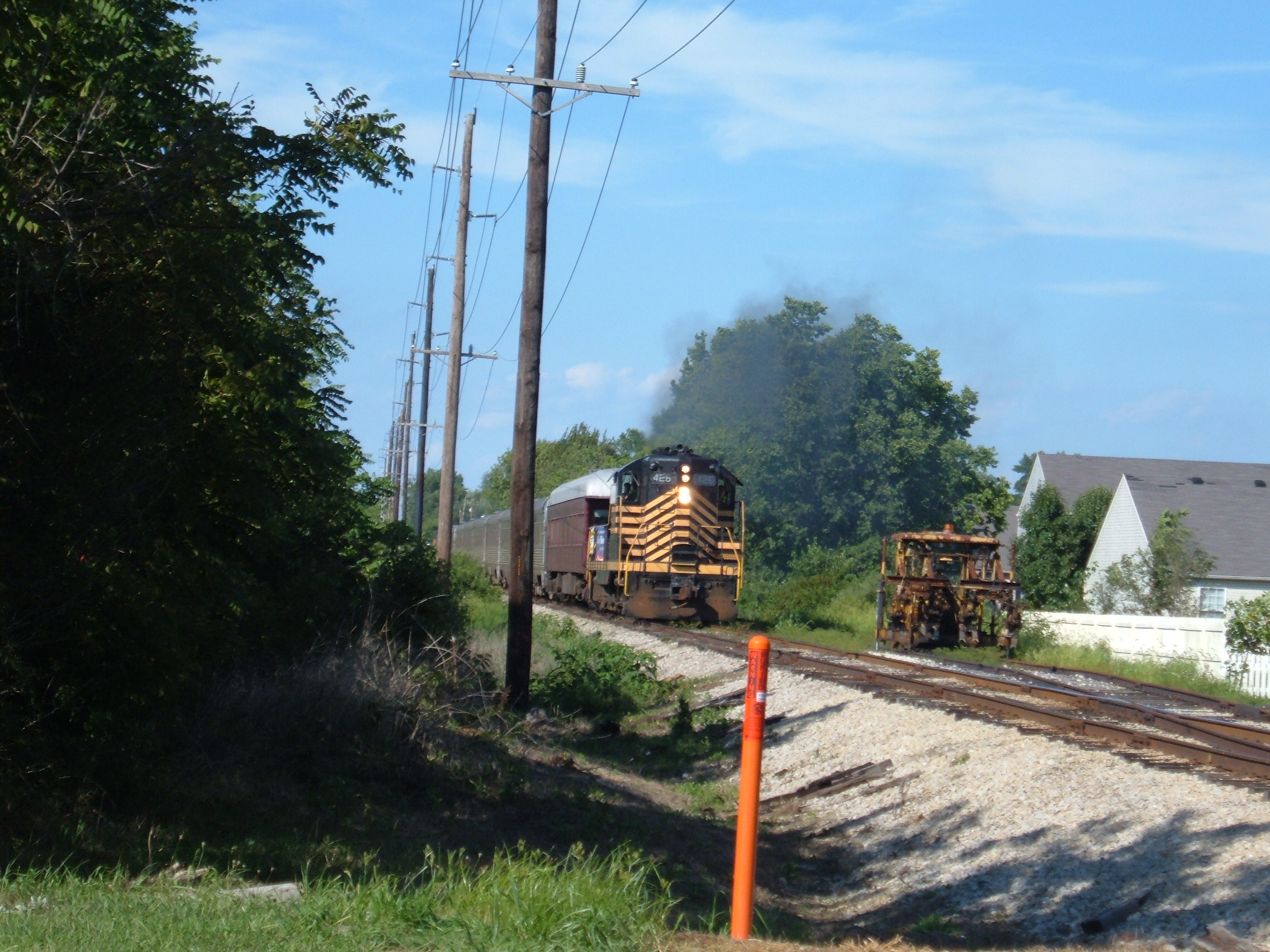
- Nickel Plate Road GP-7L diesel locomotive #426 pulling the Indiana State Fair Train.

Overview
- Headquarters: Logansport, Indiana
- Reporting mark: ITMZ (Note: Direct sources from the AAR/NMFTA cannot be publicly accessed/located, although such markings have been second-handedly verified via the FRA and visual wise; however, these marks may be considered expired, reassigned, or unofficial as of 2009.) (Temporary equipment transfers/loans)
- Locale: Northern Indiana
- Dates of operation: 1960–2023
- Successor: Nickel Plate Express

Technical
- Track gauge: 4 ft 8 1/2 in (1,435 mm) standard gauge
- Length: 38 mi (61 km)

The Indiana Transportation Museum (initialized ITM, reporting mark ITMZ) was a railroad museum that was located in the Forest Park neighborhood of Noblesville, Indiana, United States. It owned a variety of preserved railroad equipment, some of which still operate today. ITM ceased operations in 2023 and the line is now owned and operated by the Nickel Plate Express.

== History ==
The Indiana Transportation Museum was an all-volunteer not-for-profit museum dedicated to preserving and showcasing railroads of Indiana, and sharing the equipment and information with the public, as well as operating trains to show how people traveled across the country in the past.

Founded in 1960, ITM began life as the Indiana Museum of Transportation and Communication (IMOTAC) with an initial focus on preserving interurbans and trolleys along with early passenger and freight equipment. IMOTAC initially planned to build its museum in southern Indiana, but those plans did not materialize. During this time, IMOTAC was associated with the Indiana Railway Museum. However, the partnership did not last long, with IMOTAC and IRM going their separate ways. In the summer of 1964, IMOTAC signed a 99-year lease with the Noblesville Parks Department to lease a 10-acre (4.0 ha) site in Forest Park. In May 1966, IMOTAC operated a series of sesquicentennial excursions from Noblesville to Indianapolis with Grand Trunk Western 5629. IMOTAC purchased the former Nickel Plate Hobbs, Indiana, station in 1967 and moved it to Forest Park in May 1968. The depot served as the museum's gift shop, ticket booth, dispatch office, crew reporting room and as a boarding location for the museum's excursions. Following ITM's eviction, the depot was repurposed by the Nickel Plate Express.

On August 3, 1968, the museum held its grand opening and dedication ceremony. Later that year, IMOTAC purchased the Indianapolis Traction Terminal train shed. IMOTAC planned to reconstruct it in Forest Park to store and display the museum's collection and also construct a 2-story building next to the train shed to house a museum and waiting room. The train shed was disassembled and moved to Forest Park in late 1968. IMOTAC's plans did not materialize as it would have been cost prohibitive to reconstruct and the components were scrapped in the 1980s. In 1973, IMOTAC began offering trolley rides on a 1/2-mile (0.80 km) trolley line that ran from the museum property to the south entrance of Forest Park.

In the 1980s, IMOTAC decided to broaden its focus and changed its name to the Indiana Transportation Museum. In August 1983, ITM operated daily shuttle trips from Carmel, Indiana, to the Indiana State Fairgrounds over the former Monon Railroad second subdivision during that year's Indiana State Fair. The excursions were dubbed FairTrain '83 and became a yearly tradition for ITM. ITM continued operating the FairTrain over the Monon trackage until 1985. At that time, the Monon trackage was to be abandoned. The museum pushed hard to save the railroad but was unsuccessful. In 1986, the Fair Train equipment was moved back to Noblesville and plans to operate FairTrain '86 were scrapped due to high insurance costs. The Monon trackage was eventually removed and turned into the Monon Trail. Alongside ITM's attempt to save the Monon Railroad, the museum also acquired but unsuccessfully attempted to save the former Midland Railway trackage. The Midland Railway was turned into the Midland Trace Rail-Trail.

Throughout the 1980s and 1990s, the museum considered moving to a new location. The museum looked at potential sites such as the former NKP Roundhouse in Frankfort, Indiana, and several parcels of farmland in Hamilton County along the former Monon and Midland railroads and received offers from several Indiana communities, including Indianapolis. However, those plans did not materialize. From 1988 to 1998, ITM ran several mainline excursions with NKP 587 and its two Milwaukee Road EMD F7's (numbers 83A and 96C) painted in Monon Railroad colors. In 1990, ITM began operating excursions over the Nickel Plate Railroad line from Tipton to Indianapolis. In August 1990, following a five-year absence, the FairTrain resumed operations from Noblesville to the Indiana State Fairgrounds during the duration of the Indiana State Fair. Later on, FairTrain operations were moved to Fishers, Indiana, with the FairTrain operating from Fishers to the Indiana State Fairgrounds until 2015. In the 1990s, the museum and its equipment were used in film and television, including the Discovery Channel show Rediscovering America, Going All the Way (1997), and 587: The Great Train Robbery (2000). In 1999, following the electrical failure of Chicago Transit Authority EL car #4293, ITM shifted away from trolley operations. In 2008, ITM began offering caboose train rides from the museum site to downtown Noblesville. The caboose train was initially supposed to be a temporary replacement for the trolley rides with EL car #4293, which was in need of a $50,000 restoration. As a result of a lack of interest within ITM, EL car #4293 never ran again. The caboose train became a staple of ITM's later operations and continued until ITM's eviction in 2018. In April 2014, The Leviathan 63 visited the museum and operated a series of excursions from Fishers to Noblesville. This marked the first time in 12 years that steam had been operated at ITM since 587's retirement from service in 2003 and the final time ITM would operate steam powered excursions.

For the next 25 years, ITM continued to operate excursions over the Nickel Plate line until 2015, when the museum was forbidden to use the Nickel Plate line by the Hoosier Heritage Port Authority (HHPA) due to allegations of questionable practices and financial mismanagement. With ongoing issues with the city of Noblesville, ITM looked to move the museum to Logansport, Indiana. In 2017 and 2018, ITM operated excursions over U.S. Rail Corporation trackage from Kokomo, Indiana, to Walton, Indiana, using leased Iowa Pacific Holdings equipment. During this time, the museum also operated Polar Bear Express excursions over Hoosier Southern Railroad trackage from Tell City, Indiana, to Troy, Indiana, using leased Iowa Pacific Holdings and Hoosier Southern Railroad equipment throughout the fall and winter of 2018.

In 2018, the museum was evicted from Forest Park by the city of Noblesville. ITM scrapped several pieces of equipment that were deemed surplus and sold several pieces to new owners. ITM was unable to move everything from their property, so several pieces were abandoned by the organization. ITM moved most of its retained equipment to the former General Tire plant property in Logansport, Indiana in 2018 and 2019, and the remainder of the museum's Budd coaches were moved to Santa Claus, Indiana. Nickel Plate 587, Pennsylvania Railroad RPO car no. 6565, Pennsylvania Railroad B60 Baggage Car no. 9036 and Norfolk Southern water tender no. 220166 were moved to the Kentucky Steam Heritage Corporation site in Ravenna, Kentucky. Nickel Plate Road Cabooses #405 and 770 and Pennsylvania Railroad Flat car #X-66 were moved to a siding in Walton, Indiana. On July 12, 2018, the city of Noblesville seized ITM's former Forest Park site. Equipment that had been sold to a new owner prior to ITM's eviction was moved out between 2019 and 2021. Equipment that had not been sold prior to the eviction was sold off in two Ozark Mountain Railcar auctions held in 2019. Equipment that had not been sold via Ozark Mountain Railcar was either sold off to new owners, scrapped on site, or retained as a static display or for usage by the Nickel Plate Express. The former ITM site was rehabilitated and became the home of the Nickel Plate Express in 2022. In 2019, ITM struck a deal with the Logansport & Eel River Railroad (LER) to purchase the LER's 1.6-mile (2.6 km) rail line in Logansport. In 2021, ITM became involved in yet another lawsuit. The deal to purchase the Logansport & Eel River Railroad fell through and ITM was evicted from the LER property. ITM sold and scrapped its remaining assets and ceased operations. ITM was administratively dissolved by the Indiana Secretary of State on March 5, 2023. The line was purchased by new owners and now runs excursion trains, called the Nickel Plate Express, over the former ITM trackage.

=== Heritage railroad ===
While located in Noblesville, the Indiana Transportation Museum operated excursion trains on 38 miles (61 km) of a former Nickel Plate Road line originally built for the Indianapolis and Peru Railroad and, at the time of ITM's eviction, owned by the Hoosier Heritage Port Authority (HHPA), which is made up of the Indiana cities of Indianapolis, Fishers, and Noblesville. Excursion service on the line had been suspended due to a dispute with the HHPA. The museum submitted a proposal to HHPA requesting authorization to resume service.

The museum operated out of Forest Park in Noblesville and traveled to the northern terminus of the line in Tipton, Indiana, and to the southern terminus at approximately 39th Street in Indianapolis. The rail line originally extended further south but had been abandoned.

The rail line originally connected to the Norfolk Southern railroad in Tipton and to the CSX railroad in Indianapolis via the Belt Line. The railroad line had also been operated as a freight railroad by the Indiana Rail Road, hauling coal to the power generating plant in Cicero, Indiana, until the plant's conversion to natural gas in 2003.

The connection in Tipton was cut by Norfolk Southern in 1997 and the bridge connecting the line to CSX was removed by the Indiana Department of Transportation during the rebuilding of Interstate 70 in Indianapolis. In spring 2010, CSX railroad removed the diamonds connecting the southern portion to the Belt Railroad, thus isolating the line from the U.S. rail system.

=== Preservation ===
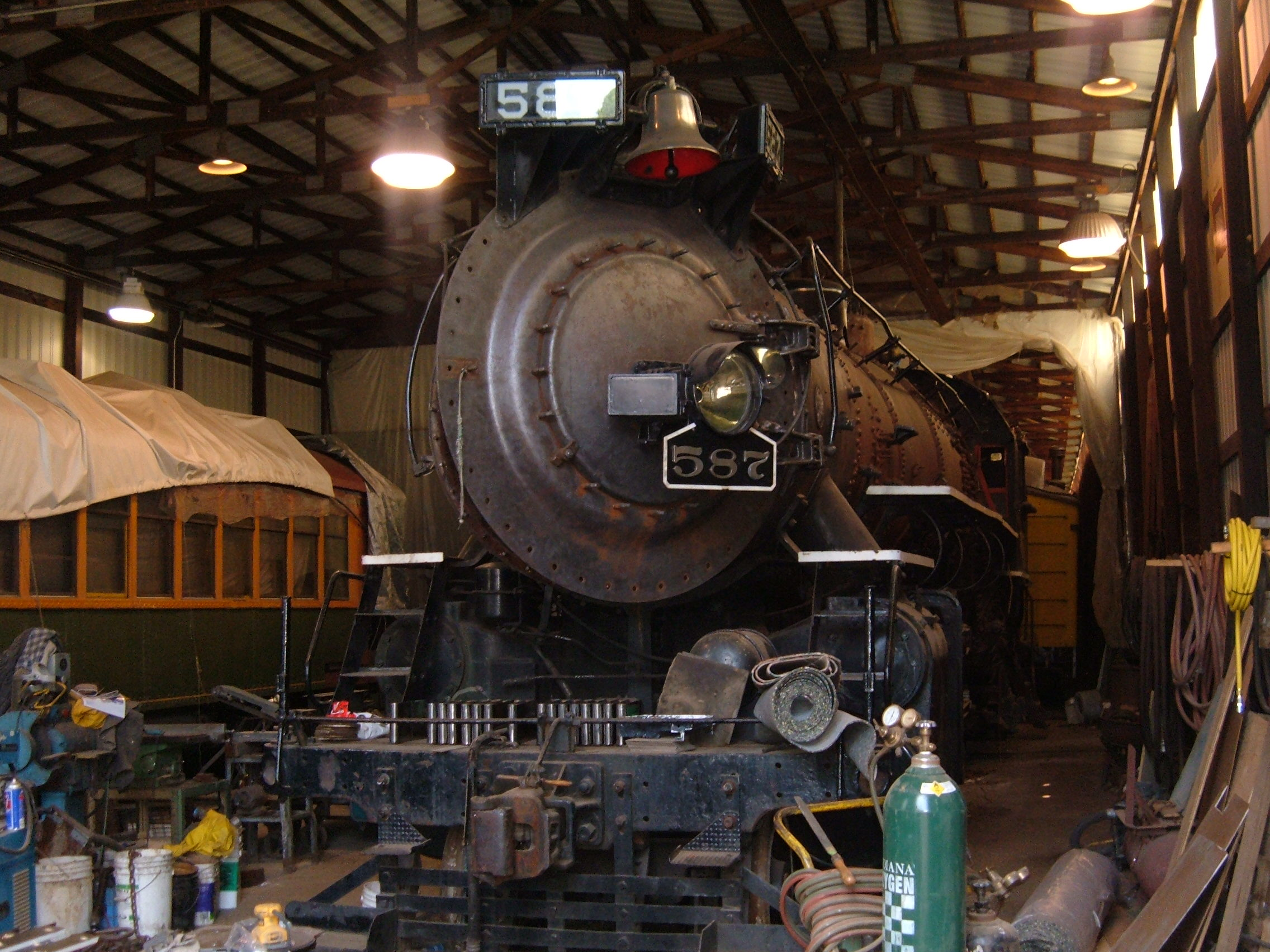
Nickel Plate Road 2-8-2 Mikado steam locomotive #587 in the restoration shops at the ITM.

The museum was home to many pieces of railroading history, with primary emphasis on locomotives and equipment relating to the Nickel Plate Railroad. Most passengers were carried in the museum's restored Budd cars that dated back to 1937 and were originally in service on the Santa Fe Railroad and the New Jersey Transit Authority before being sold to the museum as scrap in 1983. Several cars were restored and others awaited funds for restoration.

ITM also had an extensive collection of trolleys and interurbans with ties to Indiana's railroad history. ITM operated several different interurbans over its trolley line between 1973 and 1999.

While the museum was in Noblesville, it had in its collection the 1898 private railcar of Henry Morrison Flagler's Florida East Coast Railroad (FEC) #90.

At the beginning of 2003, the museum's operating steam locomotive, Nickel Plate 587, was taken out of service for a federally mandated boiler rebuild. Since then, work had been ongoing for the restoration of this locomotive. In 2008, ownership of the engine was permanently transferred from the Indianapolis Parks Department to the ITM. In 2018, the locomotive was held in storage in Ravenna, Kentucky, by the Kentucky Steam Heritage Corporation. On March 5, 2021, the ownership of No. 587 was transferred from the ITM to a private individual. As of 2025, the locomotive is to be auctioned off by the Kentucky Steam Heritage Corporation due to unpaid storage fees. However, the auction was cancelled. Kentucky Steam is currently in talks with the locomotive's former owner to reach a resolution via a settlement.

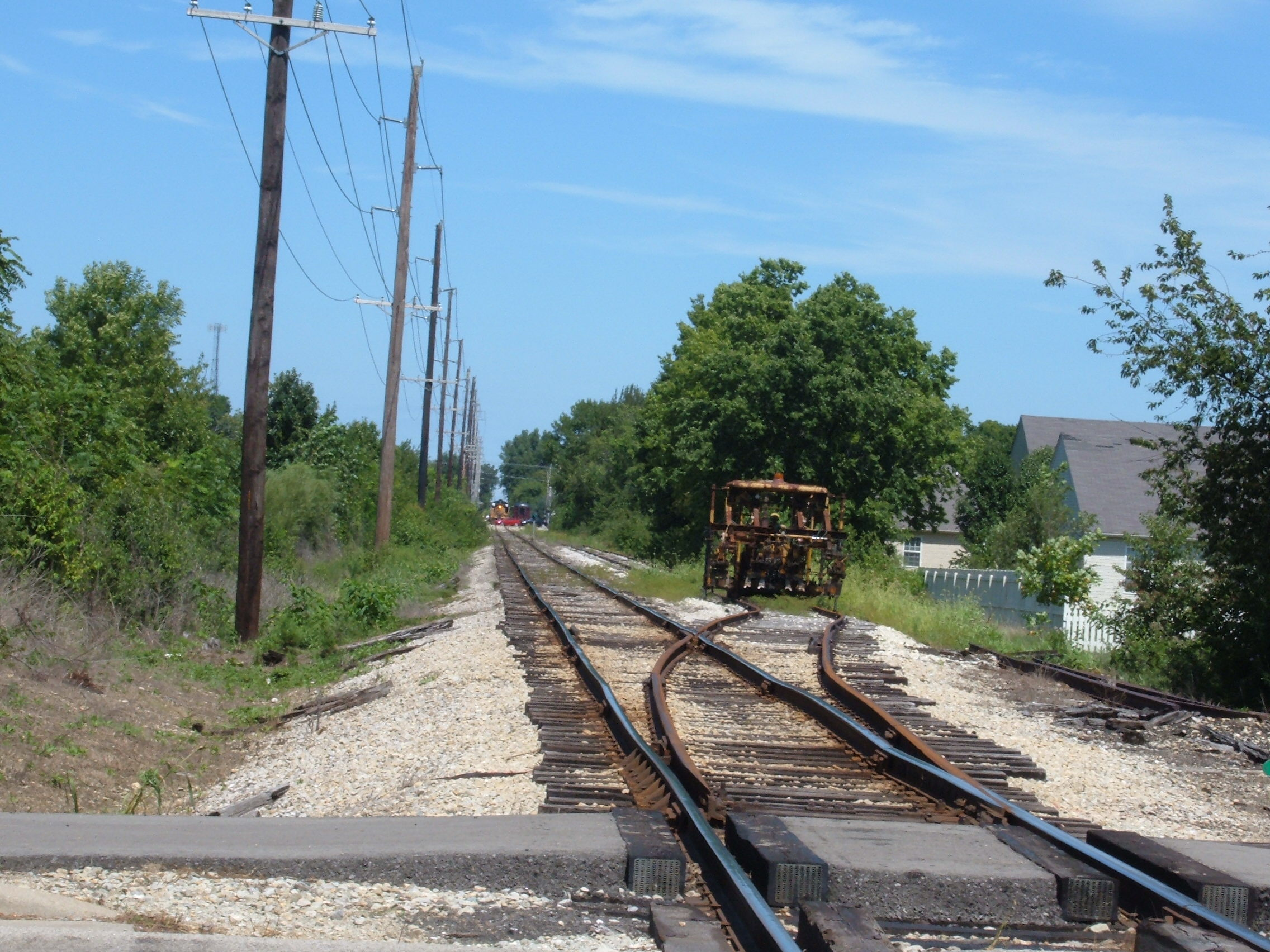
ITM's tracks in Fishers, Indiana.

=== Events ===
While in Noblesville, the Indiana Transportation Museum operated different excursions, ranging from holiday trains to shuttles in freight cabooses.

- The Morse Lake Dinner Train was a dinner train that operated from Noblesville to a variety of restaurants in Cicero, Indiana, near Morse Lake.
- The Hamiltonian, also known as the Hamiltonian Dinner Express, was a dinner train that operated from Fishers to different restaurants in either downtown Noblesville, Atlanta or Cicero.
- Dinner In The Diner was a dinner train that operated from Noblesville to Tipton, where passengers dined in the museum's Louisville & Nashville dining car no. 2728 "Cross Keys Tavern".
- The Fair Train was the museum's biggest yearly event with ITM passenger trains transporting as many as 16,000 people to the Indiana State Fair daily, with ten daily round trips each day of the fair during August.
- The Polar Bear Express was held in the months of November and December. It included a train ride and a visit from Santa Claus.
- The Harvest Train, also known as the Pumpkin Train, was held every weekend in October and was supported by the Hamilton Heights High School FFA, who grew and sold pumpkins alongside the rail line.
- The Blue Arrow, often called the Pizza Train, was run multiple Saturdays throughout the late spring, summer, and fall from Noblesville to Tipton. It gained its name because the stop in Tipton was at end of the track and adjacent to the Pizza Shack, where riders could eat. Riders also had the option of being shuttled to the nearby Pizza King or Jim Dandy Restaurant for their buffets, or on select dates, a meal at the Tipton Elks Club.
- Special events included various festivals in Tipton and the towns of Atlanta and Arcadia; private charters were also available.

=== School programs ===
The museum offered custom school tours, which included a tour of the museum grounds and an excursion train ride.

== Equipment ==
=== Locomotives ===
Locomotive details
Number	Image	Type	Model	Built	Builder	Status	Owner	Description
587		Steam	H-6o	1918	Baldwin Locomotive Works	Stored, awaiting restoration	Private owner, Ravenna, Kentucky	Built for the Lake Erie & Western Railway and numbered #5541; Leased by ITM from Indianapolis Parks Department in 1983; operated by ITM from 1988 to 2002; under restoration from 2003 until 2018; ownership transferred from the Indianapolis Parks Department to ITM in 2008. Moved to Kentucky for restoration in 2018 and sold to a private owner in 2021. To be sold at auction by Kentucky Steam Heritage Corporation due to unpaid storage fees. Auction withdrawn on March 3, 2025, discussions between Kentucky Steam and the locomotive's private owner are ongoing to reach a resolution via a settlement.
426		Diesel	GP7L	1953	Electro-Motive Diesel	Operational	Nickel Plate Express, Noblesville, Indiana	Built for the Nickel Plate Road. Donated by Peabody Coal Co. to ITM in 2000. Operated by ITM from 2002 to 2018, sold to Nickel Plate Express, and restored to working order in 2020.
200	ITMZ GP-9 no. 200	Diesel	GP9	1954	Electro-Motive Diesel	Operational	Nickel Plate Express, Noblesville, Indiana	Built for the Union Pacific. Purchased by the Great Smoky Mountains Railroad (GSMR) in September 1988. Sold by GSMR to the Central Railroad of Indianapolis (CERA) in 1993 and renumbered 1755 in 1994. Donated to ITM by CERA in 2000. Operated by ITM from 2000 to 2018; retained by the city of Noblesville; and restored to working order by Nickel Plate Express in 2023.
83A		Diesel	F7A	1950	Electro-Motive Diesel	Stored	Nickel Plate Express, Noblesville, Indiana	Built for the Milwaukee Road and numbered #110C. Purchased by ITM in 1982, operated by ITM from 1983 to 2018. Leased to the Central Railroad of Indianapolis in 1989. Sold to the Nickel Plate Express.
96C		Diesel	FP7	1951	Electro-Motive Diesel	Stored	Fort Wayne Railroad Historical Society, Wabash, Indiana	Built for the Milwaukee Road. Purchased by ITM in 1982. Operated by ITM from 1983 to 1999, Leased to the Central Railroad of Indianapolis in 1989. Sold to the Fort Wayne Railroad Historical Society in 2021.
83C		Diesel	F7A	1950	Electro-Motive Diesel	Stored	Fort Wayne Railroad Historical Society, Wabash, Indiana	Built for the Milwaukee Road and numbered 72C. Purchased by ITM in 1982; under restoration from 2007 to 2018; Sold to the Fort Wayne Railroad Historical Society in 2021.
68B		Diesel	F7B	1950	Electro-Motive Diesel	Stored	Fort Wayne Railroad Historical Society, Wabash, Indiana	Built for the Milwaukee Road. Purchased by ITM in 1982; in storage from 1983 to 2021; Sold to the Fort Wayne Railroad Historical Society in 2021.
DS-50		Diesel	SW-1	1942	Electro-Motive Diesel	Under restoration	Hoosier Valley Railroad Museum, North Judson, Indiana	Built for the Monon. Purchased by private owner in 1989 and moved to ITM in 1989. Used for ITM's Caboose Trains from the 2000s to 2018, cab destroyed on route to Logansport, Indiana. Moved to the Hoosier Valley Railroad Museum in 2021, currently undergoing restoration to operating condition.
99		Diesel	VO-1000	1945	Baldwin Locomotive Works	Display	Forest Park, Noblesville, Indiana	Built for the Crane Naval Depot and numbered 9. Donated by ITM by US Navy in 1991 or 1992, re-painted and lettered as Nickel Plate Road 99 in 1998. Operated by ITM from the late 90s to early 2000s, placed on static display in the 2000s. Displayed by ITM from the 2000s to 2018. Sale to the city of Kokomo failed; retained by city of Noblesville and remains on display.
91		Diesel	44-Tonner	1950	GE Transportation	Stored	Coastal Logistics Group, Garden City, GA	Built for the Boyne City Railroad and numbered 70. Sale to the city of Kokomo failed; sold to Coastal Logistics Group of Garden City, GA via Ozark Mountain RailCar in 2019.
1		Fireless	0-4-0F	1950	H.K. Porter	Stored	Hesston Steam Museum, La Porte, Indiana	Built for Indianapolis Power & Light. Donated to ITM by Indianapolis Power & Light in 1990 or 91; To be restored to operating condition by ITM, but plans did not materialize; Stored by ITM from 1990 or 91 until 2018. Sold to the Hesston Steam Museum in 2018; the tank/pressure vessel was scrapped in Noblesville.
867		Diesel	SW-1	1939	Electro-Motive Diesel	Scrapped	None	Built for the Milwaukee Road. Purchased by ITM and used as a parts source for Monon SW-1 #DS-50; repainted to original Milwaukee Road #1613 by Thomas Harleman in 2015; Scrapped in Noblesville on July 4, 2018.
1		Electric	Electric Locomotive	1898	General Electric	Stored	Hoosier Heartland Trolley Company	Built for the Singer Sewing Machine Company. Purchased by private owner in 1971 and moved to ITM. Operated by ITM from 1971 to 1988; Damaged in a derailment on May 21, 1988. Displayed by ITM from 1988 until 2018; Sold to RAIL Foundation in Francisville, Indiana, in 2018; Sold by RAIL Foundation to Hoosier Heartland Trolley Company in 2021.
154		Electric	Steeple Cab Electric Locomotive	1912	General Electric	Scrapped	None	Built for the Evansville & Ohio Valley Railroad. Purchased by ITM in 1967; Scrapped in Noblesville in July 2018.
55		Electric	Steeple Cab Electric Locomotive	1915	Detroit United Railway	Scrapped	None	Built for the Detroit United Railway, Sold to the Cedar Rapids & Iowa City Railway (CRANDIC). Acquired by ITM in 1963 or 1964. Sold to Hoosier Heartland Trolley Company in 2018, Scrapped for parts by HHTC in 2019.
4		Electric	Steeple Cab Electric Locomotive	1929	Baldwin Locomotive Works/Westinghouse	Display	Ironhorse Railroad Park, Chisago City, Minnesota	Built for the Twin Branch Railroad. Sold to Ironhorse Railroad Park in July 2018.
1		Diesel	110 tonner	1972	General Electric	Disposition unknown	Unknown	Built for Indianapolis Power & Light. Donated to ITM by Indianapolis Power & Light in 2019. Resold to unknown owner. Disposition unknown.
2		Diesel	110 tonner	1966	General Electric	Disposition unknown	Unknown	Built for Indianapolis Power & Light. Donated to ITM by Indianapolis Power & Light in 2019. Resold to unknown owner. Disposition unknown.

=== Interurbans and trolleys ===
Interurbans and trolleys details
Number	Image	Type	Built	Builder	Status	Owner	Description
69		Mule car	1869	Unknown	Stored	Hoosier Heartland Trolley Company	Built for the Citizens' Street Railway Company. Donated to ITM by the Indianapolis Transit System in 1972. Displayed by ITM from 1972 to 2018. Used by ITM for the FairTrain '83 press conference in August 1983. Sold to Hoosier Heartland Trolley Company in 2020.
		Birney Streetcar	1922	J.G. Brill Company	Stored	South Shoreline Museum, Francisville, Indiana	Built for the Lafayette Street Railway. Donated by private owner to ITM in 1984, Stored by ITM from the 1980s to 2018. Sold to South Shoreline Museum in 2018, Moved to Francisville, Indiana.
153		Streetcar	1935	J.G. Brill Company	Stored	Hoosier Heartland Trolley Company	Built for the Indianapolis Street Railway Company. Donated to ITM by Otho Smith in 1972. Stored by ITM from 1972 to 2018; Sold to Hoosier Heartland Trolley Company in 2018.
81		Interurban	1902	Jewett Car Company	Stored	Hoosier Heartland Trolley Company	Built for the Terre Haute, Indianapolis & Eastern Traction Company. Purchased by ITM in 1978. Stored by ITM from 1978 to 2018; Sold to Hoosier Heartland Trolley Company in 2018.
308		Interurban	1906	Niles Car and Manufacturing Company	Operational	Illinois Railway Museum, Union, Illinois	Built for the Chicago, Aurora and Elgin Railroad. Purchased by ITM from the Chicago, Aurora and Elgin Railroad in 1962. First car acquired by ITM. Used by ITM for trolley rides from 1973 to sometime in the 1980s; Under restoration from 198? to 1996. Sold to Illinois Railway Museum in 1996.
429		Interurban	1925	St. Louis Car Company	Under restoration	Hoosier Heartland Trolley Company	Built for the Union Traction Company, Named Noblesville. Donated by Atkinson & Company to ITM in 1964. Stored by ITM from 1964 to 2018; Sold to Hoosier Heartland Trolley Company in 2018. Currently undergoing restoration to operating condition.
437		Interurban	1925	St. Louis Car Company	Stored	Hoosier Heartland Trolley Company	Built for the Union Traction Company. Stored by ITM from 1981 to 2018; Sold to Hoosier Heartland Trolley Company in 2018.
172		Interurban	1919	Cincinnati Car Company	Stored	Illinois Railway Museum, Union, Illinois	Built for the Chicago, North Shore and Milwaukee Railroad. First car used by ITM for trolley rides; Used by ITM for trolley rides from 1973 to 1992. Stored by ITM from 1992 to 2018; Sold to the Illinois Railway Museum in 2018.
205		Interurban Trailer car	1929	Pullman Standard	Scrapped	None	Built for the Chicago, South Shore and South Bend Railroad. Purchased by National Park Service in 1984. Sold by NPS to ITM in 1984. Stored by ITM from 1984 to 2018; Sold to RAIL Foundation in 2018. Scrapped for parts in 2018. Parts to be used for South Shoreline Museum projects.
4257		EL car	1923	Cincinnati Car Company	Scrapped	None	Built for the Chicago Transit Authority. Stored by ITM from 1980 to 2018; Scrapped in Noblesville in June 2018.
4293		EL car	1924	Cincinnati Car Company	Stored	South Shoreline Museum, Michigan City, Indiana	Built for the Chicago Transit Authority. Used by ITM for trolley rides from 1973 to 1999; Suffered electrical failure in 1999. Stored by ITM from 1999 to 2018; Sold to RAIL Foundation in 2018 and moved to Michigan City, Indiana; Sold by RAIL Foundation to South Shoreline Museum in 2022.
4315		EL car	1923	Cincinnati Car Company	Scrapped	None	Built for the Chicago Transit Authority. Stored by ITM from 1978 to 2018; Scrapped in Noblesville in April 2018.
4381		EL car	1924	Cincinnati Car Company	Scrapped	None	Built for the Chicago Transit Authority. Stored by ITM from 1978 to 2018; Scrapped in Noblesville in April 2018.
4388		EL car	1924	Cincinnati Car Company	Scrapped	None	Built for the Chicago Transit Authority. Stored by ITM from 1979 to 2018; Scrapped in Noblesville in June 2018.
4390		EL car	1924	Cincinnati Car Company	Scrapped	None	Built for the Chicago Transit Authority. Stored by ITM from 1979 to 2018; Scrapped in Noblesville on June 12, 2018.
4453		EL car	1924	Cincinnati Car Company	Operational	East Troy Electric Railroad, East Troy, Wisconsin	Built for the Chicago Transit Authority. Used by ITM for trolley rides from 1979 to 1995; Sold to East Troy Electric Railroad in 1995.
4454		EL car	1924	Cincinnati Car Company	Scrapped	None	Built for the Chicago Transit Authority. Used by ITM for trolley rides from 1976 to 1991; Stored by ITM from 1991 to 2018. Scrapped in Noblesville in April 2018.
606		Line car	1921	Chicago, North Shore and Milwaukee	Stored	South Shoreline Museum, Murphysboro, Illinois	Built for the Chicago, North Shore and Milwaukee as a line car. Burned by vandals in 1978; Stored by ITM from 1978 to 2018. Sold to South Shoreline Museum in 2018 and moved to Murphysboro, Illinois.
4566		PCC streetcar	1947	St. Louis Car Company	Disposition unknown	Unknown	Built for the Cincinnati Street Railway and numbered 1166. Sold by Cincinnati to the Toronto Transit Commission in 1950 and renumbered to 4566. Donated by the city of Toronto, Canada to ITM in 1982. Disposition Unknown.

=== Rolling stock ===
Rolling stock details
Number	Image	Type	Built	Builder	Status	Owner	Description
1601		Railway Post Office car	1940	Budd Company	Stored	American Passenger Train History Museum, Charles City, Iowa	Built for the Chicago, Burlington & Quincy Railroad, Named Silver Mail. Donated to ITM in 1991, Moved to Logansport in 2019. Stored by ITM from 1991 to 2021. Sold to American Passenger Train History Museum in March 2023.
801		Combine car	1947	Budd Company	Stored	East Tennessee Rail Services Inc.	Built for the Chicago, Burlington & Quincy Railroad, Named Silver Salon. Purchased by ITM from New Jersey Transit in 1983. Converted into Head end power car by ITM; Used by ITM from 1984 until 2015. Moved to Santa Claus, Indiana, in 2018. Sold to private owner in May 2021; Sold to East Tennessee Rail Services Inc. In May 2021.
3072		Budd Coach	1937	Budd Company	Stored	Great Smoky Mountains Railway, Dillsboro, North Carolina	Built for the Atchison, Topeka and Santa Fe Railway. Purchased by ITM from New Jersey Transit in 1983, Used on ITM Excursions from 1984 until 2015. Moved to Santa Claus, Indiana, in 2018. Sold to private owner in May 2021; Sold to the Great Smoky Mountains Railway in February 2023.
3078		Budd Coach	1937	Budd Company	Display	Oklahoma Railroad Museum, Oklahoma City, Oklahoma	Built for the Atchison, Topeka and Santa Fe Railway. Purchased by ITM from New Jersey Transit in 1983, Used on ITM Excursions from 1984 until 2015. Moved to Santa Claus, Indiana, in 2018. Sold to private owner in May 2021; Sold to the Oklahoma Railroad Museum in March 2022.
3080		Budd Coach	1937	Budd Company	Scrapped	None	Built for the Atchison, Topeka and Santa Fe Railway. Purchased by ITM from New Jersey Transit in 1983, Burned by vandals on August 2, 1996. Scrapped in Noblesville on October 15, 2021.
3081		Budd Coach	1937	Budd Company	Stored	Great Smoky Mountains Railway, Dillsboro, North Carolina	Built for the Atchison, Topeka and Santa Fe Railway. Purchased by ITM from New Jersey Transit in 1983, Used on ITM Excursions from 1984 until 2015. Moved to Santa Claus, Indiana, in 2018. Sold to private owner in May 2021; Sold to the Great Smoky Mountains Railway in February 2023.
3082		Budd Coach	1937	Budd Company	Scrapped	None	Built for the Atchison, Topeka and Santa Fe Railway. Purchased by ITM from New Jersey Transit in 1983, Moved to Logansport in 2019; Stored by ITM from 1983 to 2021. Scrapped in Logansport in 2021.
3083		Budd Coach	1937	Budd Company	Scrapped	None	Built for the Atchison, Topeka and Santa Fe Railway. Purchased by ITM from New Jersey Transit in 1983, Moved to Logansport in 2019; Stored by ITM from 1983 to 2021. Scrapped in Logansport in 2021.
3092		Budd Coach	1937	Budd Company	Stored	Great Smoky Mountains Railway, Dillsboro, North Carolina	Built for the Atchison, Topeka and Santa Fe Railway. Purchased by ITM from New Jersey Transit in 1983; Used on ITM Excursions from 1984 until 2015. Moved to Santa Claus, Indiana, in 2018. Sold to private owner in May 2021; Sold to the Great Smoky Mountains Railway in February 2023.
3093		Budd Coach	1937	Budd Company	Stored	Private owner, Santa Claus, Indiana	Built for the Atchison, Topeka and Santa Fe Railway. Purchased by ITM from New Jersey Transit in 1983; Used on ITM Excursions from 1984 until 2015. Moved to Santa Claus, Indiana, in 2018. Sold to private owner in May 2021.
3094		Budd Coach	1937	Budd Company	Scrapped	None	Built for the Atchison, Topeka and Santa Fe Railway. Purchased by ITM from New Jersey Transit in 1983, Moved to Logansport in 2019; Stored by ITM from 1983 to 2021. Scrapped in Logansport in 2021.
3095		Budd Coach	1937	Budd Company	Stored	Private owner, Santa Claus, Indiana	Built for the Atchison, Topeka and Santa Fe Railway. Purchased by ITM from New Jersey Transit in 1983; Used on ITM Excursions from 1984 until 2015. Moved to Santa Claus, Indiana, in 2018. Sold to private owner in May 2021.
3096		Budd Coach	1937	Budd Company	Stored	Private owner, Santa Claus, Indiana	Built for the Atchison, Topeka and Santa Fe Railway. Purchased by ITM from New Jersey Transit in 1983; Used on ITM Excursions from 1984 until 2015. Moved to Santa Claus, Indiana, in 2018. Sold to private owner in May 2021.
3097		Budd Coach	1937	Budd Company	Stored	Private owner, Santa Claus, Indiana	Built for the Atchison, Topeka and Santa Fe Railway. Purchased by ITM from New Jersey Transit in 1983; Used on ITM Excursions from 1984 until 2015. Moved to Santa Claus, Indiana, in 2018. Sold to private owner in May 2021.
3098		Budd Coach	1937	Budd Company	Stored	Private owner, Santa Claus, Indiana	Built for the Atchison, Topeka and Santa Fe Railway. Purchased by ITM from New Jersey Transit in 1983; Used on ITM Excursions from 1984 until 2015. Moved to Santa Claus, Indiana, in 2018. Sold to private owner in May 2021.
3099		Budd Coach	1937	Budd Company	Stored	Private owner, Santa Claus, Indiana	Built for the Atchison, Topeka and Santa Fe Railway. Purchased by ITM from New Jersey Transit in 1983; Used on ITM Excursions from 1984 until 2015. Moved to Santa Claus, Indiana, in 2018. Sold to private owner in May 2021.
6523		Railway Post Office car	1911	PRR Altoona Works	Stored	Fort Wayne Railroad Historical Society, Wabash, Indiana	Built for the Pennsylvania Railroad. Displayed by ITM from 1992 to 2018. Sold to Fort Wayne Railroad Historical Society in 2018.
6565		Railway Post Office car	1913	PRR Altoona Works	Stored	Kentucky Steam Heritage Corporation, Ravenna, Kentucky	Built for the Pennsylvania Railroad. Donated to ITM in 1987; Converted into tool/crew car by ITM for Nickel Plate Road 587 in 1987/88. Used behind 587 from 1988 to 2002. Stored by ITM from 2003 to 2018. Moved to Kentucky Steam Heritage Corporation property in 2018. Sold to Kentucky Steam in March 2021.
9026		B60 Baggage car	1920s/30s	PRR Altoona Works	Stored	Aberdeen, Carolina and Western Railway, Candor, North Carolina	Built for the Pennsylvania Railroad. Converted by ITM into Head end power car with bike racks in 2007. Used by ITM for various events. Sold to the Aberdeen, Carolina and Western Railway in 2019 via Ozark Mountain Railcar.
9036		B60 Baggage car	1920s/30s	PRR Altoona Works	Stored	Kentucky Steam Heritage Corporation, Ravenna, Kentucky	Built for the Pennsylvania Railroad. Used as storage by ITM for NKP 587 parts from 2003 to 2018. Moved to Kentucky Steam Heritage Corporation property in 2018. Sold to Kentucky Steam in 2021.
7010		Heavyweight Lounge car	1929	Pullman Standard	Scrapped	None	Built for the Pennsylvania Railroad. Purchased by ITM in 1986. Moved to Logansport in 2019. Stored by ITM from 1986 to 2021. Scrapped in Logansport on April 29, 2021.
8898		Heavyweight Sleeper car	1929	Pullman Standard	Scrapped	None	Built for the Pennsylvania Railroad. Purchased by ITM in 1986. Moved to Logansport in 2019. Stored by ITM from 1986 to 2021. Scrapped in Logansport on April 29, 2021.
8007		Sleeper car	1939	Pullman Standard	Stored	Private owner, Santa Claus, Indiana	Built for the Pennsylvania Railroad, Named Philadelphia County. Purchased by ITM from the Pennsylvania Railroad along with Magic Brook in 1967. Sold to Louisville Railway Company in 2021. Currently stored in Santa Claus, Indiana.
8020		T1 Duplex Sleeper Car	1939	Pullman Standard	Disposition Unknown	Unknown	Built for the Pennsylvania Railroad, Named Magic Brook. Purchased by ITM from the Pennsylvania Railroad along with Philadelphia County in 1967. Sold to unknown party in the 1980s or 1990s. Disposition unknown.
3		Business car	1888	Pullman Standard	Under restoration	Colebrookdale Railroad, Boyerstown, Pennsylvania	Built for the Wheeling & Lake Erie Railway, Named Huron. Donated to ITM by Nickel Plate Railroad in 1964. Sold to the Colebrookdale Railroad in 2021.
45		Coach	1907	American Car and Foundry	Scrapped	None	Built for the Nickel Plate Road, Donated to ITM by Norfolk & Western Railway in 1965. Scrapped in Noblesville in July 2018.
11		Pay car	1893	Wason Manufacturing Company	Display	Ironhorse Railroad Park, Chisago City, Minnesota	Built for the Delaware & Hudson Railway, Used as office by the city of Noblesville in the 1960s and 1970s. Donated to ITM by the Delaware & Hudson Railroad in 1964. Stored by ITM from 1964 to 2018. Sold to Ironhorse Railroad Park in 2018.
2785		Sleeper car	1849	Pullman Standard	Scrapped	None	Built for the Atlantic Coast Line Railway, Named Marion County. Renumbered 6642 following Seaboard Air Line & Atlantic Coast Line merger. Resold to Amtrak in the 1970s and renumbered 2785. Sold by Amtrak to ITM sometime in the 1970s or 1980s. Displayed by ITM from the 1970s or 1980s until 2018. Scrapped in Noblesville on July 9, 2018.
8091		Dining car	1957	Pullman Standard	Display	Pueblo Railway Museum, Pueblo, Colorado	Built for the Seaboard Air Line, Named Naples. Displayed by ITM from the 1970s to 2018. Sold to private owner in 2022; Moved to the Pueblo Railway Museum in November 2022.
4328		Coach	1917	Pullman Standard	Stored	Hoosier Valley Railroad Museum, North Judson, Indiana	Built for the Erie-Lackawanna Railroad. Used by ITM for the 1984 Indiana State Fair Train; Stored by ITM from 1985 to 2018. Sold to Hoosier Valley Railroad Museum in 2018.
4336		Coach	1917	Pullman Standard	Scrapped	None	Built for the Erie-Lackawanna Railroad. Used by ITM for the 1984 Indiana State Fair Train, Moved to Logansport in 2019. Stored by ITM from 1985 to 2019, Scrapped in Logansport in 2021.
4337		Coach	1917	Pullman Standard	Scrapped	None	Built for the Erie-Lackawanna Railroad. Used by ITM for the 1984 Indiana State Fair Train, Moved to Logansport in 2019. Stored by ITM from 1985 to 2019, Scrapped in Logansport in 2021.
4361		Coach	1930	Pullman Standard	Scrapped	None	Built for the Erie-Lackawanna Railroad. Used by ITM for the 1984 Indiana State Fair Train, Moved to Logansport in 2019. Stored by ITM from 1985 to 2019, Scrapped in Logansport in 2021.
1185		Coach	1927	Standard Steel Car Company	Scrapped	None	Built for the Central Railroad of New Jersey. Used by ITM for the 1984 Indiana State Fair Train; Moved to Logansport in 2019. Stored by ITM from 1985 to 2023; Scrapped in Logansport in 2023.
1306		Baggage car	1916	Pullman Standard	Scrapped	None	Built for the Norfolk and Western Railway. Moved to Logansport in 2019. Stored by ITM from 2000 to 2021; Scrapped in Logansport in 2021.
8222		Baggage car	1921	American Car and Foundry	Display	Forest Park, Noblesville, Indiana	Built for the New York Central Railroad. Displayed by ITM from the 1970s to 2018. Retained by city of Noblesville as a static display.
10634		Observation car	1948	Pullman Standard	Operational	Norfolk Southern Railway	Built for the 1948 20th Century Limited; Named Sandy Creek. Numbered 10571 by NYC in 1952, renumbered 10634 in 1958. Displayed by ITM from the mid-1970s to mid 1980s. Sold to American Orient Express in the mid-1980s. Sold by American Orient Express to Norfolk Southern.
90		Private car	1898	Jackson and Sharp Company	Display	Monon Connection Museum, Monon, Indiana	Built for the Florida East Coast. Sold to private owner in the 1950s, purchased by Tony Hulman in 1969. Stored in Terre Haute, Indiana, from 1969 until 1985. Placed on permanent loan to ITM by the Hulman Foundation in 1985. Used by ITM for special events; sold to the Monon Connection Museum in July 2018.
1		Business car	1929	Pullman Standard	Display	Fort Wayne Railroad Historical Society, New Haven, Indiana	Built for the Nickel Plate Road. Sold to Norfolk and Western Railway in 1964, renumbered 103 in 1967. Sold to private owner in the 1970s; purchased by ITM in 1999. Used by ITM from 2001 to 2015 for excursions and special events, sold to Felix Powell in 2018, on loan to NPE. Stored in Forest Park from 2000 to 2026, Sold to Fort Wayne Railroad Historical Society in 2026.
2728		Dining car	1930	American Car and Foundry	Operational	Tennessee Valley Railroad Museum, East Chattanooga, Tennessee	Built for the Louisville and Nashville Railroad. Donated to ITM by the L&N on May 10, 1969. Used by ITM for various events from 1983 to 2011. Under restoration from 2011 to 2018; sold to the Tennessee Valley Railroad Museum.
X-66		Flatcar	1903	Unknown	Stored	Hoosier Valley Railroad Museum, North Judson, Indiana	Built for the Pennsylvania Railroad (Central Indiana). Donated by Alcoa Aluminum Co. of West Lafayette, Indiana, in December 1986. Stored by ITM from 1986 to 2014; Converted into Open Air car with benches in 2014. Used by ITM from 2014 to 2018 for various events. Moved to Walton, Indiana in 2018, then subsequently moved to Lincoln, Indiana in 2019. Stored by ITM in Lincoln, Indiana from 2019 to 2022. Sold to Hoosier Valley Railroad Museum in the Fall of 2022.
943		Reefer	1910	American Car and Foundry	Stored	Illinois Railway Museum, Union, Illinois	Built for Kingan and Company. Purchased by ITM from building owner in 2014. To be restored, but plans did not materialize. Stored in Kirklin, Indiana, by ITM from 2014 to 2021; Donated to the Illinois Railway Museum in June 2021.
X50571		Camp car	1910	Haskel & Barker	Scrapped	None	Built for the Lake Erie and Western Railway as a Boxcar. Sold to the Nickel Plate Road in 1922 following merger with the LE&W. Converted into Camp Car. Displayed by ITM from the 1970s to 2018; Scrapped in Noblesville the Fall of 2021.
18013		Boxcar	1917	Haskel & Barker	Stored	Fort Wayne Railroad Historical Society, Wabash, Indiana	Built for the Lake Erie and Western Railway, sold to the Nickel Plate Road in 1922 following merger with the LE&W. Displayed by ITM from the 1970s to 2018; Used for special events. Sold to the Fort Wayne Railroad Historical Society in 2021.
85709		Boxcar	1917	Haskel & Barker	Scrapped	None	Built for the Lake Erie and Western Railway and numbered 12209. Sold to the Nickel Plate Road in 1922 following merger with the LE&W, renumbered 85709. Displayed by ITM from the 1970s to 2018; Scrapped in Noblesville in the Fall of 2021.
47181		Boxcar	1927	American Car and Foundry	Scrapped	None	Built for the Wabash Railroad. Donated by Alcoa Aluminum Co. of West Lafayette, Indiana, in December 1986. Displayed by ITM from 1986 to 2018; Scrapped in Noblesville in the Fall of 2021.
47194		Boxcar	1927	American Car and Foundry	Display	J. H. Hawes Elevator & Museum, Atlanta, IL	Built for the Wabash Railroad. Donated by Alcoa Aluminum Co. of West Lafayette, Indiana, in December 1986. Stored by ITM from 1986 until sometime in the 1990s or 2000s. Donated by ITM to the J.H. Hawes Elevator & Museum in the 1990s or 2000s.
47619		Boxcar	1927	American Car and Foundry	Display	Forest Park, Noblesville, Indiana	Built for the Wabash Railroad. Donated by Alcoa Aluminum Co. of West Lafayette, Indiana, in December 1986. Displayed by ITM from 1986 to 2018; Retained by city of Noblesville as a static display.
17112		Boxcar	1929	American Car and Foundry	Display	Schlatter Boys Transport, Francisville, Indiana	Built for the Wabash Railroad. Donated by Alcoa Aluminum Co. of West Lafayette, Indiana, in December 1986. Displayed by ITM from 1986 to 2018; Sold to Schlatter Boys Transport in 2019.
17179		Boxcar	1929	American Car and Foundry	Display	Aberdeen, Carolina and Western Railway, Candor, North Carolina	Built for the Wabash Railroad. Donated by Alcoa Aluminum Co. of West Lafayette, Indiana, in December 1986. Displayed by ITM from 1986 to 2007; Under Restoration from 2007 to 2018; To be converted into Restroom but never converted; Sold to the Aberdeen, Carolina and Western Railway in 2019 via Ozark Mountain Railcar.
17193		Boxcar	1929	American Car and Foundry	Display	Aberdeen, Carolina and Western Railway, Candor, North Carolina	Built for the Wabash Railroad. Donated by Alcoa Aluminum Co. of West Lafayette, Indiana, in December 1986. Stored by ITM from 1986 to 2018; Sold to the Aberdeen, Carolina and Western Railway in 2019 via Ozark Mountain Railcar.
49762		Boxcar	1929	American Car and Foundry	Stored	Fort Wayne Railroad Historical Society, Wabash, Indiana	Built for the Wabash Railroad. Donated by Alcoa Aluminum Co. of West Lafayette, Indiana, in December 1986. Stored by ITM from 1986 to 2021; Moved to Logansport in 2019. Sold to the Fort Wayne Railroad Historical Society in 2021.
3746 - (14141)		Tank car	1930	Petroleum Iron Works	Disposition unknown	Unknown	Built for (Gulf Oil) / Warren Petroleum. Displayed by ITM from 1986 to 2018; Used for special events. Disposition unknown.
25		Hopper car	1931	Unknown	Disposition unknown	Unknown	Built for Alcoa Aluminum Co. Donated by Alcoa Aluminum Co. of West Lafayette, Indiana, in December 1986. Resold to unknown party in the 1980s or 1990s. Disposition unknown.
26		Hopper Car	1931	Unknown	Disposition unknown	Unknown	Built for Alcoa Aluminum Co. Donated by Alcoa Aluminum Co. of West Lafayette, Indiana, in December 1986. Resold to unknown party in the 1980s or 1990s. Disposition unknown.
27		Hopper car	1931	Unknown	Scrapped	None	Built for Alcoa Aluminum Co. Donated by Alcoa Aluminum Co. of West Lafayette, Indiana, in December 1986. Moved to Logansport in 2019. Stored by ITM from 1986 to 2021. Scrapped in Logansport on April 29, 2021.
665244		H39 Hopper car	1960	PRR Altoona Works	Stored	Hoosier Valley Railroad Museum, North Judson, Indiana	Built for the Pennsylvania Railroad. Stored by ITM from 1989/90 to 2007; Used for special events. Abandoned by ITM at the corner of 82th Street in 2007. Sold to the Hoosier Valley Railroad Museum in October 2021.
257784		H34C Covered Hopper car	1957	PRR Altoona Works	Stored	Fort Wayne Railroad Historical Society, Wabash, Indiana	Built for the Pennsylvania Railroad. Displayed by ITM from 1987 to 2018; Used for special events. Sold to the Fort Wayne Railroad Historical Society in 2021.
497329		X31A Boxcar	1936	PRR Altoona Works	Display	Everett Railroad, Duncansville, Pennsylvania	Built for the Pennsylvania Railroad. Displayed by ITM from 1989/90 to 2018. Sold to the Everett Railroad in 2019 via Ozark Mountain Railcar.
1220		Boxcar	1941	Pullman Standard	Stored	Hoosier Valley Railroad Museum, North Judson, Indiana	Built for the Monon Railroad. Donated by Alcoa Aluminum Co. of West Lafayette, Indiana, in December 1986. Moved to Logansport in 2019. Stored by ITM from 1986 to 2021. Sold to private owner and moved to the Hoosier Valley Railroad Museum on August 7, 2021.
253		Boxcar	1942	Pullman Standard	Scrapped	None	Built for the U.S. Navy. Moved to Logansport In 2018. Stored by ITM from the late 1970s to 2021; Scrapped in Logansport in 2021.
254		Boxcar	1942	Pullman Standard	Scrapped	None	Built for the U.S. Navy. Moved to Logansport In 2018. Stored by ITM from the late 1970s to 2021; Scrapped in Logansport in 2021.
4828		Boxcar	1945	Pullman Standard	Display	Forest Park, Noblesville, Indiana	Built for the U.S. Navy. Retained by City of Noblesville as a static display.
8099		Boxcar	1944	Pullman Standard	Stored	Gulf & Ohio Railways, Knoxville, Tennessee	Built for the Nickel Plate Road. Displayed by ITM from the 1970s to 2018; Used for special events. Sold to Gulf & Ohio Railways in 2019 via Ozark Mountain Railcar.
37191		Reefer	1948	General American Tank Car	Display	Schlatter Boys Transport, Francisville, Indiana	Built for the Milwaukee Road. Sold to Schlatter Boys Transport in 2019 via Ozark Mountain Railcar and moved to Francisville, Indiana.
7		Reefer	1940s	Pressed Steel Car Company	Scrapped	None	Built for Alcoa Aluminum Co. Donated by Alcoa Aluminum Co. of West Lafayette, Indiana, in December 1986. Stored by ITM from 1986 to 2018; Scrapped in Noblesville in July 2018.
25011		Premium Reefer	1954	General American Tank Car	Scrapped	None	Built for Swift and Company. Stored by ITM from the 1970s to 2018. Scrapped in Noblesville in October 2021.
25019		Premium Reefer	1954	General American Tank Car	Scrapped	None	Built for Swift and Company. Stored by ITM from the 1970s to 2018. Scrapped in Noblesville in October 2021.
25023		Premium Reefer	1954	General American Tank Car	Scrapped	None	Built for Swift and Company. Stored by ITM from the 1970s to 2018. Scrapped in Noblesville in October 2021.
8826 - (46587)		Boxcar	1962	Pullman Standard	Display	Forest Park, Noblesville, Indiana	Built for the Louisville and Nashville Railroad. Displayed by ITM from the early 1980s to 2018. Retained by city of Noblesville as a static display.
12177		Boxcar	1967	Pullman Standard	Stored	Fort Wayne Railroad Historical Society, Wabash, Indiana	Built for the Louisville and Nashville Railroad. Moved to Logansport in 2019; Stored by ITM from the early 1980s to 2021. Sold to the Fort Wayne Railroad Historical Society in 2021.
12341		Boxcar	1967	Louisville and Nashville South Louisville Shops	Display	Forest Park, Noblesville, Indiana	Built for the Louisville and Nashville Railroad. Displayed by ITM from the early 1980s to 2018. Retained by city of Noblesville as a static display.
112088		Boxcar	1946	Louisville and Nashville South Louisville Shops	Disposition unknown	Unknown	Built for the Louisville and Nashville Railroad. Moved to Logansport in 2019; Stored by ITM from the early 1980s to 2021. Disposition unknown.
81528		Cupola Extended-Vision Caboose	1957	Monon Railroad	Operational	Nickel Plate Express, Noblesville, Indiana	Built for the Monon Railroad. Used on ITM's Caboose Trains; privately owned, used by Nickel Plate Express for various events.
81551		Transfer Caboose	1956	Monon Railroad	Awaiting restoration	Hoosier Valley Railroad Museum, North Judson, Indiana	Built for the Monon Railroad. Sold to private owner and moved to Hoosier Valley Railroad Museum in 2021.
1039		Cupola Caboose	1884	Nickel Plate Road	Scrapped	None	Built for the Nickel Plate Road. Donated to ITM by Norfolk and Western Railway in 1964. Stored by ITM from 1964 until 2018. Scrapped in Noblesville on July 9, 2018.
770		Cupola Caboose	1956	Nickel Plate Road	Stored	Private owner, English Lake, Indiana	Built for the Nickel Plate Road. Donated to ITM by the Cincinnati Railway Society in 1987, used on ITM's Caboose Trains from the 1990s to 2018. Moved to Walton, Indiana in 2018, then subsequently moved to Lincoln, Indiana in 2019. Stored by ITM in Lincoln, Indiana from 2019 to 2022. Sold to Schlatter Boys Transport in 2022, Sold to private owner in 2022 and moved to English Lake, Indiana.
405		Bay Window Caboose	1955	Nickel Plate Road	Display	Private owner, Xenia, Ohio	Built for the Nickel Plate Road. Donated to ITM by Norfolk Southern in 1991, used on ITM's Caboose Trains from 2008 to 2018. Moved to Walton, Indiana in 2018, then subsequently moved to Lincoln, Indiana in 2019. Stored by ITM in Lincoln, Indiana from 2019 to 2022. Sold to Schlatter Boys Transport in 2022. Sold by Schlatter Boys Transport to private owner and moved to Xenia, Ohio, converted into Airbnb.
77956		Cupola Caboose	1922	Unknown	Stored	Aberdeen, Carolina and Western Railway, Candor, North Carolina	Built for the Grand Trunk Western. Used on ITM's Caboose Trains. Sold to the Aberdeen, Carolina and Western Railway in 2019 via Ozark Mountain Railcar.
90876		Cupola Caboose	1926	Unknown	Display	Forest Park, Noblesville, Indiana	Built for the Chesapeake & Ohio. Used on ITM's Caboose Trains, Painted, renumbered 1282 and lettered for the Nickel Plate Road in the 1990s. Reverted to C&O appearance in the 2000s. Retained by city of Noblesville as a static display.
251958		Auxiliary Water Tender	1944	Baldwin Locomotive Works	Stored	Kentucky Steam Heritage Corporation, Ravenna, Kentucky	Built for Louisville and Nashville class M-1 #1958. Converted into water tender for N&W 611 by Norfolk Southern in 1982 and renumbered #220166; Used behind 611 until 1987. Used behind NKP 587 during the 1989 NRHS Convention in 1989; Donated to ITM by NS in 1989. Used behind NKP 587 from 1989 to 1997; Stored by ITM from 1997 to 2018. Renumbered 251958 by KSHCO and moved to Kentucky Steam Heritage Corporation property in 2018; Sold to Kentucky Steam in 2021.
663 (HC13)		Steam Generator Car	1948	Electro-Motive Diesel	Scrapped	None	Built for the Great Northern Railway as EMD F3B Unit #432B. Converted by Great Northern into Steam Generator on June 16, 1966; Reclassified as Heater Car #13. Renumbered to #663 by Amtrak; Stored by ITM from the 1990s until 2018. Scrapped in Noblesville on October 15, 2021.
4		25-ton Crane	1950	Unknown	Stored	Forest Park, Noblesville, Indiana	Built for Alcoa Aluminum Co. Donated by Alcoa Aluminum Co. of West Lafayette, Indiana, in December 1986. Used by ITM from 1986 to 2018. Retained by city of Noblesville.
		15-ton Crane	1961	Unknown	Stored	Schlatter Boys Transport, Francisville, Indiana	Built for Purdue University's coal-fired power plants. Used by ITM from the 1990s to 2018. Sold to Schlatter Boys Transport in 2019; Moved to Francisville, Indiana.

== Accidents ==
Throughout ITM's history, there were several accidents.

- In 1988, 9 of the museum's Budd coaches were involved in a runaway and collided with Singer Sewing Machine Company electric locomotive no. 1. The first 2 coaches derailed and knocked down a Public Service Indiana light pole and a power line.
- In 1992, an ITM locomotive traveling southbound struck a Fishers Department of Public Works street sweeper on a dirt road north of 116th St. in Fishers.
- In July 1996, an ITM train struck the drivers side of a parked truck in Noblesville.
- In October 1996, an ITM train headed south to the Indiana State Fairgrounds struck a car at the ungated 65th St. crossing in Indianapolis. The occupants of the car were injured.
- In August 2003, the FairTrain struck a van at the ungated 65th St. crossing in Indianapolis.
- In September 2003, ITM's Railfan Day 2003 excursion headed to Tipton struck a truck at the 216th St. crossing in Cicero.
- In 2005, the FairTrain clipped a truck near 82nd St. and struck a car at the 75th St. crossing in Indianapolis.
- In November 2014, the Blue Arrow heading south to Noblesville and Fishers struck a truck at the Park Road crossing in Tipton. The female driver of the vehicle was killed.
- In December 2014, the Polar Bear Express derailed near downtown Noblesville while on route back to Fishers.

== See also ==
- List of United States railroads
- List of Indiana railroads
- List of heritage railroads in the United States
- List of railway museums
