= Nickel Plate Road 587 =

Preserved NKP H-6o 2-8-2 locomotive

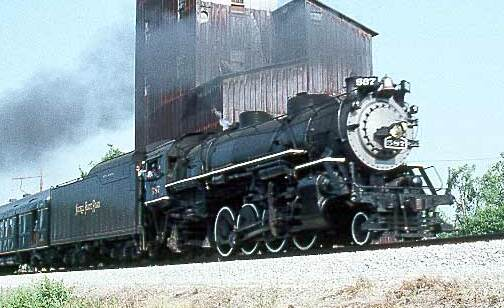
- NKP No. 587 passing at Boyleston, Indiana, with an excursion train on June 29, 1991
Type and origin
- Power type: Steam
- Builder: Baldwin Locomotive Works
- Serial number: 49683
- Model: USRA Light Mikado
- Build date: September 1918
- Rebuild date: 1943
Specifications
- Configuration
  - Whyte: 2-8-2
  - UIC: 1'D1'
- Gauge: 4 ft 8 1/2 in (1,435 mm)
- Leading dia.: 33 in (0.838 m)
- Driver dia.: 63 in (1.600 m)
- Trailing dia.: 43 in (1.092 m)
- Length: 90 ft 6 7/8 in (27.61 m)
- Height: 14 ft 11 in (4.55 m)
- Adhesive weight: 221,500 lb (100.5 t)
- Loco weight: 282,000 lb (127.9 t)
- Total weight: 637,000 lb (289 t)
- Tender type: NKP class 22RA
- Fuel type: Coal
- Fuel capacity: 40,000 lb (18.1 t)
- Water cap.: 22,000 US gal (83,000 L; 18,000 imp gal)
- Firebox
  - Grate area: 66.7 sq ft (6.20 m^{2})
- Boiler pressure: 200 psi (1.38 MPa)
- Cylinders: Two, outside
- Cylinder size: 26 in × 30 in (660 mm × 762 mm)
- Valve gear: Walschaerts
- Valve type: Piston valves
- Loco brake: Air
- Train brakes: Air
- Couplers: Knuckle
Performance figures
- Tractive effort: 54,720 lbf (243.4 kN)
- Factor of adh.: 4.05
Career
- Operators: Lake Erie and Western Railroad; Nickel Plate Road; Norfolk Southern Railway; Indiana Transportation Museum
- Class: H-6o
- Number in class: 2nd of 15
- Numbers: LE&W 5541; NKP 587
- Retired: March 1955 (revenue service); November 2002 (1st excursion service)
- Preserved: September 9, 1955
- Restored: August 29, 1988
- Current owner: Private owner
- Disposition: Stored, awaiting restoration
- Nickel Plate Road Steam Locomotive No. 587
- Formerly listed on the U.S. National Register of Historic Places
- Location within Kentucky Location within the United States
- Location: Kentucky Rail Heritage Center, Ravenna, Kentucky
- Coordinates: 37°41′02.2″N 83°51′21.3″W
- Built: 1918
- Architect: United States Railroad Administration
- NRHP reference No.: 84000313

Significant dates
- Added to NRHP: November 28, 1984
- Removed from NRHP: November 15, 2021

Nickel Plate Road 587 is a preserved H-6o class 2-8-2 "USRA Light Mikado" type steam locomotive, built by the Baldwin Locomotive Works (BLW) for the Lake Erie and Western Railroad (LE&W) as its No. 5541. In 1923, the LE&W was merged into the New York, Chicago and St. Louis Railroad (NYC&St.L), commonly referred to as the "Nickel Plate Road", and allocated No. 587 as its new number in 1924.

Following a lengthy service career with the LE&W and the Nickel Plate, the locomotive was retired to Broad Ripple Park in Indianapolis, Indiana, on September 9, 1955. In the 1980s, No. 587 was restored to operating condition and went on to operate public excursions for 11 years.

From 2003 to 2018, the locomotive was being restored by the Indiana Transportation Museum (ITMZ) in Noblesville, Indiana. However, in 2018, the museum was being moved to Logansport, Indiana, forcing No. 587 to be stored in Ravenna, Kentucky by the Kentucky Steam Heritage Corp. Since its arrival in Kentucky, No. 587 has been sold by the Indiana Transportation Museum to a private owner. There are plans to continue the locomotive restoration, but if and when that will happen is unknown. It was listed on the National Register of Historic Places in 1984 but was delisted on November 15, 2021. In 2025, No. 587 was to be auctioned off due to unpaid storage fees, however the auction was withdrawn in favor of a settlement agreement with the locomotive's former owner.

== History ==
=== Revenue service ===
No. 587 was originally built for the Lake Erie & Western Railroad (LE&W) in September 1918 and originally numbered as 5541. LE&W was bought by Nickel Plate Road (NKP) in 1922, which spent the next two years consolidating and standardizing the locomotive number system. In 1924, LE&W 5541 was renumbered as NKP 587. Its cylinders were replaced with Lima Locomotive Works (LLW) castings during a late 1943 overhaul.

No. 587 served on the NKP for 37 years on the route from Indianapolis to Michigan City. The locomotive remained relatively unchanged from its original design, when it pulled its final revenue train in March 1955 and was officially retired from revenue service.

=== Retirement ===
On September 9, 1955, No. 587 was donated to the city of Indianapolis and put on display in Broad Ripple Park. Prior to being put on display, the locomotive's original tender was swapped with another NKP 2-8-2, No. 639, because the tender on No. 639 was in need of repair and 587's original tender was in good mechanical condition. No. 587 was originally equipped with the 16-ton, 10,000-gallon tender used behind USRA 2-8-2s, but in the 1930s, it received a larger 16RA tender that carries 20 tons of coal and 20,000 gallons of water.

In 1934, Lima Locomotive Works delivered twenty-five 22RA tenders to the NKP for Mikados. These tenders were nearly identical to those behind the 2-8-4 "Berkshires", which were also built by Lima.

In 1955, another Mikado, No. 639 was shopped with a 22RA tender on which the stoker was inoperable, and the railroad switched tenders to keep the No. 639 running. No. 587 was displayed in Indianapolis's Broad Ripple Park with the larger 22RA tender in 1955. No. 639 was retired in 1957 and displayed in Bloomington, Illinois with No. 587's 16RA tender.

In 1976, the Indiana Transportation Museum (ITM) (then known as the Indiana Museum of Transportation & Communication) was growing concerned over the condition of No. 587. The museum attempted to get the locomotive from the park but was unsuccessful, with the Indianapolis Parks Department deeming that they did not have the authority to hand it over to IMOTAC.

No. 587 remained in Broad Ripple Park until October 1983. At that time the city of Indianapolis was interested in building a new public library in the park, but the only available location was where No. 587 was displayed.

=== Restoration ===
A group of people, called "Friends of 587", did a feasibility study and determined that the locomotive was a good candidate for restoration. The Indiana Transportation Museum (ITM) then signed a 25-year lease on No. 587 from the Indianapolis Parks Department. The ITM also leased a work area at Amtrak's Beech Grove Shops to perform the restoration on the locomotive. No. 587 was removed from the park on October 10, 1983, and work to restore the locomotive subsequently started. During the process, museum officials discovered that when the welds holding the fire box doors closed (for safety purposes) were removed, there were still ashes in the ashpan. This indicated that the locomotive was simply pulled from active service and stored until being donated to the city of Indianapolis.

Restoration work consisted of thousands of volunteer hours and nearly $250,000 in donated money and materials. After restoration was completed, the locomotive performed a successful test run on August 29, 1988. No. 587 pulled its first excursion train on September 17, from Indianapolis to Logansport.

=== Excursion service ===
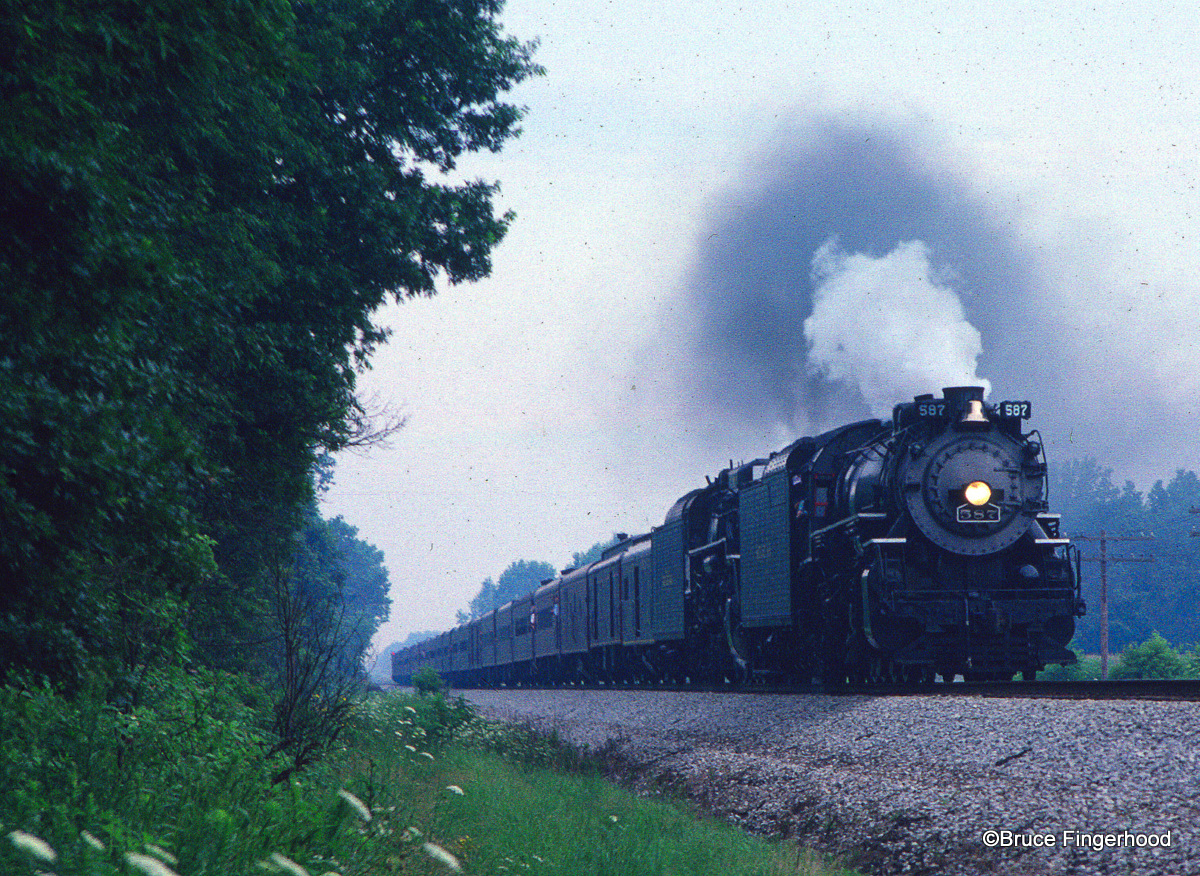
No. 587 leads a doubleheader with Nickel Plate Road 765 in northern Indiana in 1993.

No. 587 was operated by the ITM and was considered its main attraction. It was used primarily to pull the museum's Fair Train from Fishers, IN to the Indiana State Fair in Indianapolis, IN and other special events.

In October 1988, April 1989, July and October 1993, and in June 1994, No. 587 made runs down to Bloomington, Indiana, along with a side trip over Tulip Trestle, 20 miles west of Bloomington. In 1989, No. 587 performed a doubleheader with Norfolk and Western 611 to pull the annual Independence Limited from Rocky River, Ohio to Roanoke, Virginia over a four-day period from June 17–20, with 587 being added at Bellevue, Ohio. On July 16, 1989, No. 587, No. 611 and Norfolk and Western 1218 tripleheaded from Roanoke to Lynchburg, Virginia, as a prelude to the National Railway Historical Society (NRHS) Convention held in Asheville, North Carolina. On July 19, No. 587 doubleheaded with No. 1218 and the 14-car Asheville Special excursion to Asheville, where the former lead the excursion on July 21 between Asheville and Bulls Gap, Tennessee, and a photo session was held later that night, with then-North Carolina governor James Martin attending.

After the 1989 NRHS convention ended, the Friends of 587 and the ITM got into a legal dispute over the control of No. 587. The feud would last nearly 2 years, with the engine sitting in storage in an eastside Indianapolis warehouse. The matter was settled in 1991, with ITM taking control of No. 587 and returning it to excursion service in the spring of that year.

In 1993, No. 587 led a doubleheader with NKP No. 765 on an excursion from Fort Wayne to Chicago, Illinois, as part of that year's NRHS Convention. This marked the first time No. 587 visited Chicago since its restoration. On August 30, 1994, No. 587 along with a tool car in tow, deadheaded to the Monticello Railway Museum (MRM) to undergo needed repair work. The restoration cost $250,000 and took 3 years to complete. Following the completion of the repair work, No. 587 made a few runs at the MRM to benefit the restoration of Southern Railway 401, in May 1997.

In August 1998, No. 587 operated its final mainline excursion from Indianapolis to Worthington, Indiana over Indiana Southern Railroad trackage. In late 1998, in conjunction with the NKP Historical and Technical Society's annual meeting in Noblesville, No. 587 hauled a round-trip excursion between Indianapolis and Atlanta, Indiana. During its layover in Atlanta, No. 587 performed two photo runbys with period freight cars. On November 2, 2002, with the locomotive's Federal Railroad Administration (FRA)-mandated rebuild approaching within a few months, No. 587 made its final runs at the ITM; an all day excursion over the museum's entire 38 miles (61 km) line from Tipton to Indianapolis. In January 2003, No. 587's operating permit expired. This was due to FRA's requirements to have all boiler tubes and flues from steam locomotives to be replaced every 15 years, or 1,472 days of operation.

=== Downtime ===
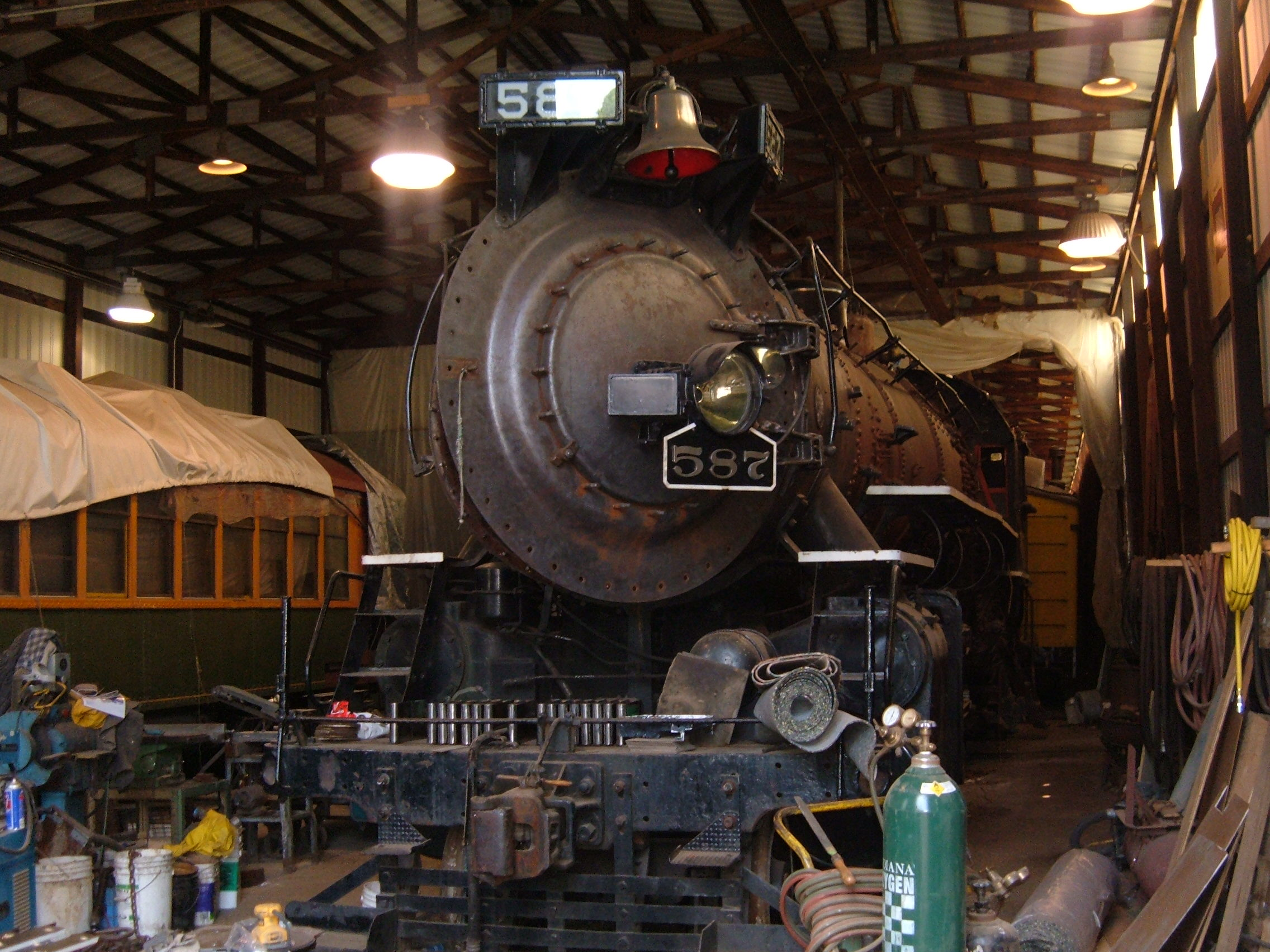
The disassembled No. 587 at the Indiana Transportation Museum's restoration shops in 2005

No. 587 was undergoing its second overhaul dependent on funding and available volunteer efforts. The tubes, flues, dry pipe, super-heater and many other components were removed. The dry pipe was worn too thin to support the steam pressures necessary to operate the locomotive. A new dry pipe was formed and is awaiting installation into the boiler. The air pump was removed and rebuilt and is in storage awaiting re-installation. Several sections of the firebox were cut away and replaced as well as a section of the rear tube sheet that was worn too thin to support the operating steam pressure. A new tube sheet section was cut and using the heat and beat method was molded into place. It was in the contractor's shop to have the new holes drilled in it. New tubes were swaged, which is a process of reducing the diameter on one end while not cutting away any material. They were transported to the museum in Noblesville and are currently stored until they are needed. Riveting of the firebox was nearly complete with only the front section and several rivets in the corners needing to be replaced. This required the rear driver of No. 587 to be dropped into a shallow pit to allow for the riveting to take place.

The locomotive was inside the ITM's shop undergoing additional work. It was lifted several inches off its supporting trucks and running gear to allow access to the leaf springs and bushings without the need to drop all the drivers. The bushings will be removed and replaced as most have worn thin from years of use. In 2008, the ownership of No. 587 was officially transferred from the Indianapolis Parks Department to the ITM. The smoke box was deemed to be too thin and was replaced.

=== Storage in Kentucky and 2025 auction ===
On June 28, 2018, a court order required ITM to vacate its former location. The Kentucky Steam Heritage Corporation (KSHCO) made a deal with the museum to relocate No. 587 before the deadline. Plans called for the locomotive to be moved to Ravenna, Kentucky and have it stored alongside Chesapeake and Ohio 2716 until the ITM could raise enough funds for restoration, and they wanted to eventually return the locomotive back to Indiana once the restoration was complete. On July 7, most of the main components of No. 587 left the museum's property, except for the tender body, which left the site on July 12 and was fully unloaded on July 14. On March 5, 2021, the ownership of No. 587 was transferred from the ITM to a private individual, who is working with KSHCO regarding the future of the locomotive. No. 587 will be remaining in Ravenna until a solid plan can be attained. No. 587 was also delisted from the National Register of Historic Places on November 15, 2021.

On January 23, 2025, No. 587 was scheduled to be sold at public auction due to unpaid storage fees incurred while stored at the Kentucky Steam Heritage Corporation's campus in Irvine, Kentucky. The auction was to be conducted via sealed bids with a deadline of February 25. The winning bidder was responsible for removing the locomotive and tender within sixty days of notification. The auction was later withdrawn on March 3, 2025, as KSHCO and the locomotive's former owner are in talks for a resolution through a settlement agreement.

== In popular culture ==
In the fall of 1991, No. 587 was one of five mainline steam locomotives scheduled to be filmed on the Elgin, Joliet and Eastern Railway in the Chicago area for an action movie titled Night Ride Down, with the others being NKP 765, Reading 2100, Canadian Pacific 1238, and 1286, and the movie would have been set around a labor union strike in the 1930s. The movie was cancelled, due to the early 1990s recession, and when lead actor Harrison Ford quit the project over script changes.

In 1992, No. 587 was featured in the Railroads, Rebels & Robbers episode of the Discovery Channel show Rediscovering America.

In 1998, No. 587 was selected as the starring locomotive to appear in the children's movie Old 587: The Great Train Robbery. In the film, a group of kids find the locomotive in a scrapyard. With the help of the locomotive's old engineer, they rescued No. 587 from being cut up for scrap and donate it to the Steam City Railroad Museum.

== See also ==
- Canadian National 3254
- Grand Trunk Western 4070
- Grand Canyon Railway 4960
- Nickel Plate Road 759
- Soo Line 1003
- Southern Railway 4501

== Bibliography ==
- Boyd, Jim (2000). The Steam Locomotive: A Century of North American Classics (1st ed.). Barnes & Noble Books. ISBN 0-7607-1627-7.
