= HHPA =

HHPA may stand for:

- Hardy Holzman Pfeiffer Associates, American architectural firm
- Hexahydrophthalic anhydride, a type of organic acid anhydride
- Hoosier Heritage Port Authority
