= Nickel Plate Road class H-6o =

Class of American steam locomotives

Nickel Plate Road H-6o
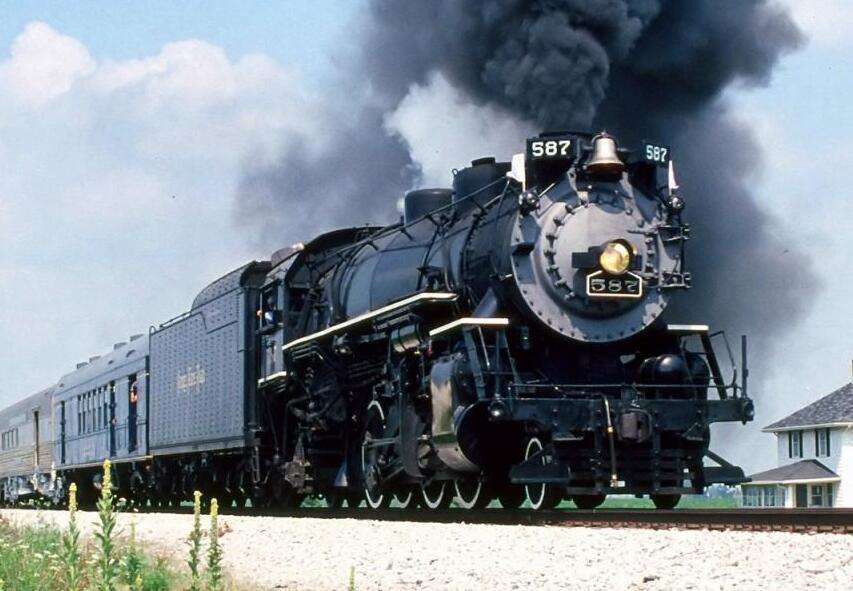
- Nickel Plate Road 587 hauling an excursion through Tipton, Indiana in June 1991.
Type and origin
- Power type: Steam
- Builder: Baldwin Locomotive Works
- Serial number: 49682-49684, 49718-49729
- Model: USRA Light Mikado
- Build date: 1918
- Total produced: 15
Specifications
- Configuration
  - Whyte: 2-8-2
  - UIC: 1'D1'
- Gauge: 4 ft 8 1/2 in (1,435 mm)
- Leading dia.: 33 in (0.838 m)
- Driver dia.: 63 in (1.600 m)
- Trailing dia.: 43 in (1.092 m)
- Length: 90 ft 6 7/8 in (27.61 m)
- Height: 14 ft 11 in (4.55 m)
- Adhesive weight: 221,500 lb (100.5 t)
- Loco weight: 282,000 lb (127.9 t)
- Total weight: 637,000 lb (289 t)
- Tender type: NKP class 22RA
- Fuel type: Coal
- Fuel capacity: 40,000 lb (18.1 t)
- Water cap.: 22,000 US gal (83,000 L; 18,000 imp gal)
- Firebox
  - Grate area: 66.7 sq ft (6.20 m^{2})
- Boiler pressure: 200 psi (1.38 MPa)
- Cylinder size: 26 in × 30 in (660 mm × 762 mm)
- Valve gear: Walschaerts
- Loco brake: Air
- Train brakes: Air
Performance figures
- Tractive effort: 54,720 lbf (243.4 kN)
- Factor of adh.: 4.05
Career
- Operators: Lake Erie and Western Railroad (LE&W); Nickel Plate Road (NKP); National Railways of Mexico (NdeM)
- Class: NKP H-6o
- Numbers: LE&W: 5540–5554; NKP: 586–600
- Preserved: 587
- Disposition: One preserved, remainder scrapped

The Nickel Plate Road H-6o was a class of 2-8-2 "Mikado" type steam locomotives that were built by the Baldwin Locomotive Works (BLW) for the Lake Erie and Western Railroad (LE&W) and were given to the New York, Chicago and St. Louis Railway (NYC&StL) or Nickel Plate Road (NKP) in 1918.

== History ==
In 1918, the LE&W ordered 15 locomotives from Baldwin where they were numbered by the Lake Erie and Western Railroad (LE&W) as 5540 through 5554. In 1922, the New York, Chicago and St. Louis Railway (NYC&StL) or Nickel Plate Road acquired the LE&W. This led to the locomotives being renumbered 586 though 600 between 1923 and 1924. Between 1945 and 1946, nos. 586, 588, 589, 591, 592, 594, 595, 596, 597, 598 and 600 were sold to the National Railways of Mexico (NdeM) in 1945 and 1946 all of those locomotives would be scrapped.

== Preservation ==
Nickel Plate Road 587 (formerly LE&W No. 5541) was retired from active service in 1955, it was later donated to the city of Indianapolis and was placed on static display in Broad Ripple Park where it remained there for 28 years later. In 1983, a group called "The Friends of the 587" formed and did a feasibility study and determined that the locomotive was good for restoration.

After five years of work, 587 returned to operating condition in 1988 and pulled its first revenue train in September 1988 from Indianapolis to Logansport, Indiana.

In 1989, 587 participated in a double-header, and triple-header with Norfolk & Western Nos. 611 and 1218 hauling with a solo passenger train alongside the excursion. During the 1990s, it also ran several excursions with NKP 'Berkshire' No. 765.

On June 28, 2018, a court order decided that 587 would need to be moved out of the ITM shops by July 12, 2018, or the locomotive would be scrapped. Thankfully, the Kentucky Steam Heritage Corporation made a deal with the ITM to relocate the 587 and move it out before the deadline. Plans called for the locomotive to be moved to Ravenna, KY and have it stored alongside Chesapeake & Ohio No. 2716 until the ITM could raise enough funds for restoration, eventually returning the locomotive back to Indiana once restoration was complete. On March 5, 2021, ownership of 587 was transferred to a private corporation, who is working with the Kentucky Steam Heritage Corporation regarding the future of the locomotive. 587 will be remaining disassembled in Ravenna, KY until a solid plan can be attained.

As of January 23, 2025, 587 is scheduled to be sold at public auction due to unpaid storage fees. The auction is to be conducted via sealed bids with a deadline of February 25th. The winning bidder will be responsible for removing the locomotive and tender within sixty days of notification.

== Accidents and incidents ==
- On September 12, 1943, Nickel Plate Road no. 590, originally LE&W 5544, derailed in Brocton, New York. It was repaired after the accident, and returned to service and operated until it was retired in February 1944, and was later scrapped at Canneaut, Ohio.

== Fleet numbers ==
LE&W No.	NKP No.	Built date	Serial number	First run date	Retirement date	Disposal date	Notes
5540	586	September 1918	49682	-	-	-	Scrapped.
5541	587	September 1918	49683	-	March 1955	1955	Stored, awaiting restoration at Ravenna, Kentucky.
5542	588	September 1918	49684	-	-	-	Scrapped.
5543	589	September 1918	49718	-	-	-	Scrapped.
5544	590	September 1918	49719	-	February 1944	-	Scrapped.
5545	591	September 1918	49720	-	-	-	Scrapped.
5546	592	September 1918	49721	-	-	-	Scrapped.
5547	593	September 1918	49722	-	-	-	Scrapped.
5548	594	September 1918	49723	-	-	-	Scrapped.
5549	595	September 1918	49724	-	-	-	Scrapped.
5550	596	September 1918	49725	-	-	-	Scrapped.
5551	597	September 1918	49726	-	-	1957	Scrapped.
5552	598	September 1918	49727	-	-	-	Scrapped.
5553	599	September 1918	49728	-	1953	1953	Scrapped.
5554	600	September 1918	49729	-	-	-	Scrapped.
