= Ohio River Scenic Railroad =

Ohio River Scenic Railroad Ohio River Train

Overview
- Dates of operation: 2010–2023

Other
- Website: https://www.ohiorivertrain.com

The Ohio River Scenic Railway is a scenic railroad that was founded by Scenic Lincoln Way, Inc. and STEM Rail, LLC, operating on parts of Southern Indiana, with multiple departure points between Tell City, Evanston and Santa Claus, Indiana.

== History ==
The railroad used 22 miles (35 km; 35,000 m) of railroad from Hoosier Southern Railroad (HSRR).

In 2023, the scenic railroad stopped operating trains as inspectors deemed track conditions unsuitable for operations.

== Equipment ==
Locomotive	Builder	Build date	Model	Status	Notes	Ref.
BUGX 1752	GMD	January 1955	FP9A	Stored in St. Marys, Georgia		
BUGX 7082	GMD	January 1959	GP9RM	Under ownership of BUGX		
Hoosier Southern 464	EMD	March 1953	GP8	Operational at the Perry County Port Authority in Tell City, Indiana		
Hoosier Southern 467	EMD	November 1952	GP7R	Stored, under ownership of the Mid America Rail Car Leasing		
