= Kentucky Steam Heritage Corporation =

Nonprofit organization

- Founded: February 7, 2016
- Type: Non-Profit
- Purpose: To provide education and preservation with vintage railroad equipment and to restore Chesapeake and Ohio 2-8-4 No. 2716.
- Location: Irvine, Kentucky
- Coordinates: 37°41′02.2″N 83°51′21.3″W
- Region served: Eastern United States
- Products: Vintage Railroad Equipment
- Website: https://www.kentuckysteam.org/

The Kentucky Steam Heritage Corporation (KSHC) is a nonprofit organization based on the border between Irvine and Ravenna, Kentucky. The organization mainly focuses on the restoration of Chesapeake and Ohio K-4 2-8-4 steam locomotive No. 2716 along with other vintage railroad equipment. The organization has plans of turning the surrounding area into its own tourist attraction called the Kentucky Rail Heritage Center through a partnership with the R.J. Corman Railroad Group and CSX Transportation.

== History ==
KSHCO was formed on February 7, 2016, and on that same day, they announced that they signed a long-term lease with the Kentucky Railway Museum of New Haven to restore and eventually operate Chesapeake and Ohio K-4 No. 2716. They spent a few years searching for a facility to properly rebuild the locomotive, and then in May 2018, KSHCO partnered with CSX Transportation to move No. 2716 to a former Louisville and Nashville rail yard in Ravenna to build a new rail-based tourist and community development center. With the help of CSX and the R.J. Corman Railroad Group, KSHCO has slowly gotten settled into their new location with the addition of more locomotives and rolling stock, and they are currently expanding their plans to enhance tourism and economic growth in central Kentucky.

== Equipment ==
=== Locomotives ===
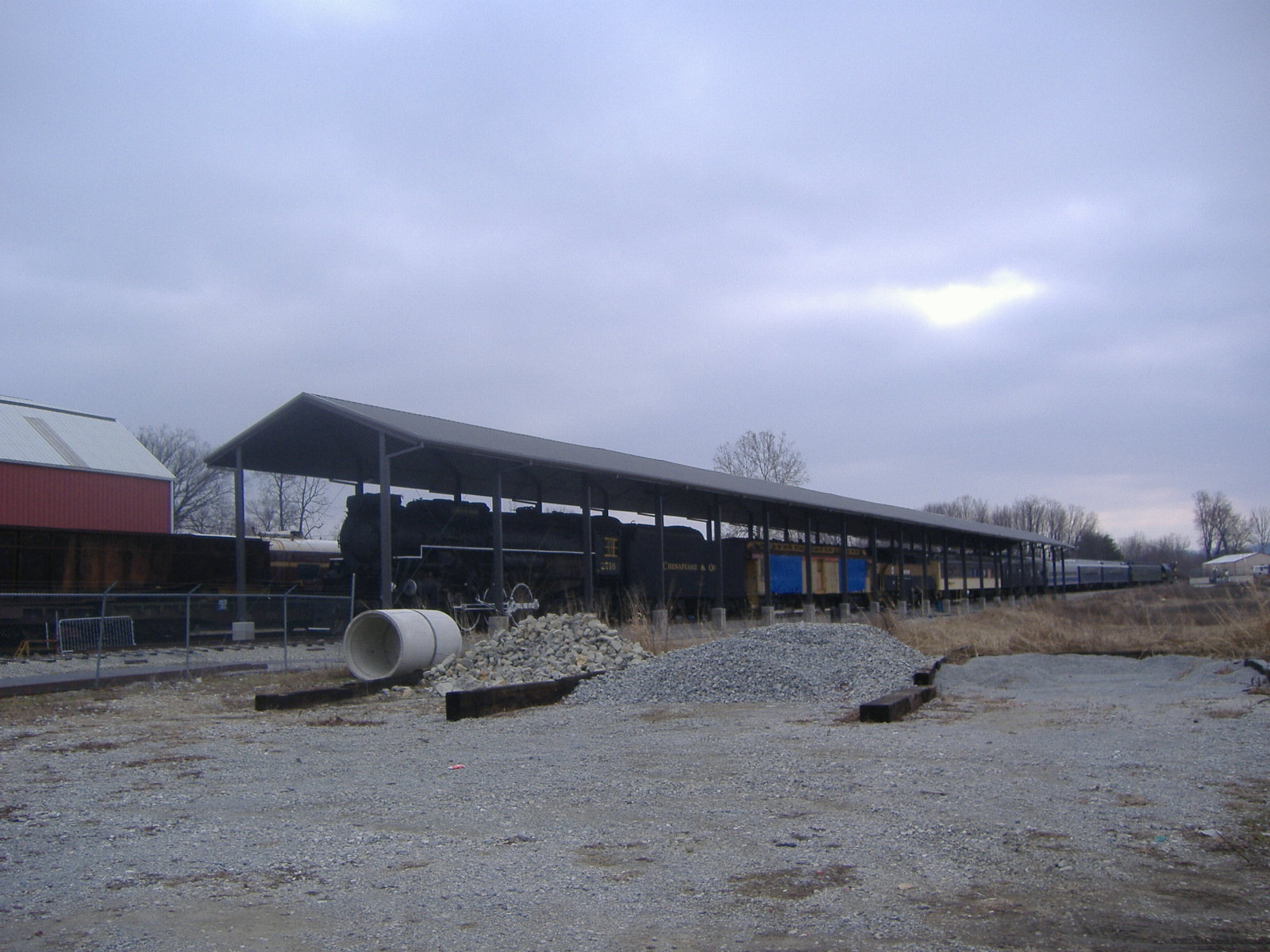
- Chesapeake and Ohio No. 2716 on static display at the Kentucky Railway Museum in 2009
  Chesapeake and Ohio K-4 2-8-4 "Kanawha" No. 2716. It was built by Alco in 1943, and it spent seventeen years on the C&O pulling heavy freight trains until it was removed from the C&O's active list in 1956, and the railroad donated the locomotive to the Kentucky Railway Museum three years later. After spending several years on display, the Kanawha was leased to the Clinchfield Railroad in 1979 for use on their steam excursion program. After the latter plans were canceled, No. 2716 became leased by the Southern Railway, who operated it for their own steam excursion program between 1981 and 1982. Firebox issues had No. 2716's first excursion career was cut short, however, and it subsequently spent the next several years being stored in Birmingham, Alabama. It was eventually leased again to the Fort Wayne Railroad Historical Society, who brought it back under steam and used it to pull mainline excursion trains throughout Indiana and Illinois during 1996, but after the locomotive's flue time expired, the FWRHS decided to ship No. 2716 back to the KRM, and it remained on static display in New Haven for the next sixteen years. When KSHCO was formed, a long-term lease was signed to move No. 2716 to a new facility and restore it to operating condition. After KSHCO acquired a new facility from CSX, No. 2716 was moved out of KRM behind Carolina, Clinchfield & Ohio Railroad (Clinchfield Railroad) F7 No. 800 to loosely recreate its move out of KRM back in 1979. Afterwards, a complete rebuild on the locomotive began taking place, beginning with the replacement of its side firebox sheets. Restoration work will likely be completed by 2030 if donations are raise and if all work proceeds as planned.
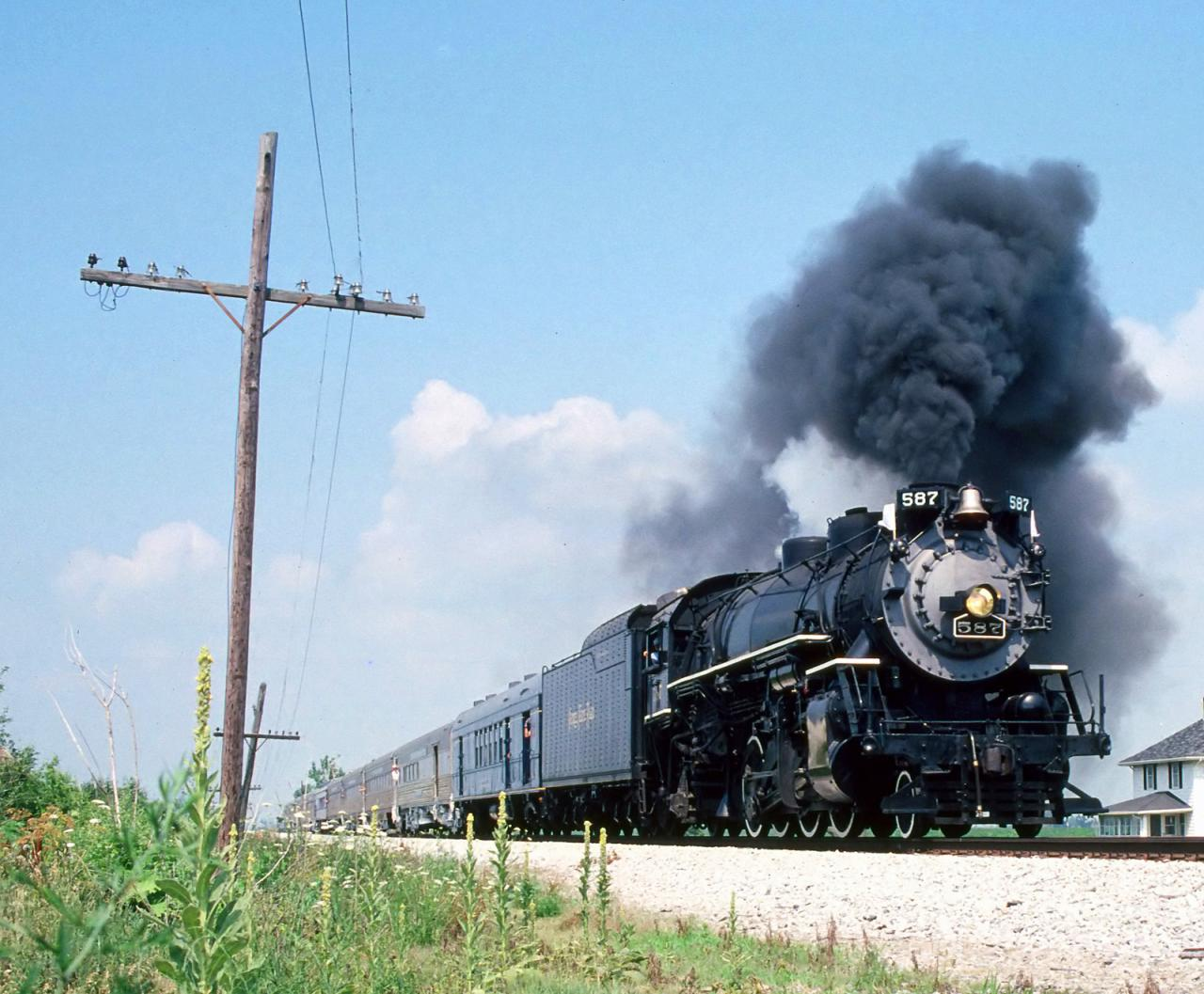
- Nickel Plate Road No. 587 pulling an excursion train in 1991
  Nickel Plate Road H-6o 2-8-2 "Mikado" No. 587. It was built by Baldwin in 1918 as Lake Erie and Western No. 5541, and it was renumbered to 587 in 1924, two years after the LE&W was purchased by the Nickel Plate. It spent several years on the Nickel Plate, pulling fast freight trains between Michigan City and Indianapolis before it was retired from the active roster in March 1955. Six months later, the locomotive was donated to the city of Indianapolis for static display in Broad Ripple Park, but not before it swapped tenders with fellow Nickel Plate 2-8-2 No. 639. No. 587 remained on display in the park while being exposed to the elements and vandals until October 10, 1983, when it was moved by a group called the "Friends of 587" to Beech Grove with the hopes of having it restored under the lease of the Indiana Transportation Museum. Since its return to steam on August 29, 1988, the locomotive spent eleven years pulling several mainline excursion trains and attending several special events, until it became limited to pulling tourist trains on ITM's own trackage, and its last run occurred in 2002 before its flue time expired. The ITM made several attempts of bringing the locomotive back to service, but after land disputes between the ITM and the city of Noblesville, KSHCO helped vacate the locomotive in 2018. As of 2021, No, 587 is stored in Ravenna, and it is owned by a private individual. To be sold at auction by Kentucky Steam due to unpaid storage fees. Auction withdrawn on March 5, 2025, discussions between Kentucky Steam and the locomotive's owner are ongoing to reach a resolution via a settlement.
- R.J. Corman QJ 2-10-2 "Santa Fe" type No. 2008 Old Smoky. It was built by CRRC Datong in 1986 as China Railways No. 7040. It spent fifteen years pulling fast and heavy freight trains over the Chinese mainline, before it became relegated to pulling trains on Jitong trackage in 2001. It was withdrawn from active service altogether by 2005. The following year, No. 7040 was shipped across the Pacific Ocean to the United States after becoming one of three QJ locomotives to be purchased by the Railroad Development Corporation for possible plans to be used on the Iowa Interstate Railroad. Shortly afterward, No. 7040 was purchased again by the R.J. Corman Railroad Group under the order of the company's chairman, Richard J. Corman, and the intentions were to bring the locomotive back under steam as a public relations tool. The locomotive was renumbered to 2008, since it made its inaugural run on May 24, 2008, and it was subsequently used for group tours and excursion services during special occasions. After Richard Corman died in 2013, No. 2008 was stored indoors, and new management at R.J. Corman made plans to donate it to the city of Midway, Kentucky. However, after the company began helping KSHCO get settled into their new location in Irvine, a final decision was made in 2020 to donate No. 2008 to KSHCO. The locomotive currently awaits to be moved to Ravenna for display and evaluation for a possible return to service.
- Louisville and Nashville C30-7 No. 7067. It was originally built by General Electric in 1980 for the Louisville and Nashville railroad. It was eventually renumbered by CSX to 1837 and repainted in a white and green livery for Marshall University of Huntington, West Virginia. CSX donated the locomotive in 2017 to the C.P. Huntington Railroad Historical Society, who stored it in their South Yard. In May 2021, the locomotive was donated again to KSHCO, who moved it to Ravenna the following summer. KSHCO has reverted No. 7067 to its L&N appearance.
- CSX SW1500 No. 1100. It was originally built by EMD in 1970 as Louisville and Nashville No. 5000, and it was eventually renumbered to 1100 after the L&N merged with the Clinchfield and the Seaboard Coast Line Railroad (which itself was a merger between the Seaboard Air Line Railroad (SAL) and the Atlantic Coast Line Railroad (ACL)) to create the Seaboard System, which was soon merged into CSX. It was used to move rolling stock throughout various freight yards throughout the southeastern United States. CSX put the locomotive in storage in 2017, and two years later, they donated it to KSHCO. KSHCO currently uses No. 1100 as their own yard switcher, and they have plans to eventually revert it to its original identity as L&N No. 5000.
- Norfolk Southern SD40-2 No. 6162. It was originally built by EMD in 1978 for the Norfolk and Western Railway, and it continued service after the N&W merged with the Southern Railway to create the Norfolk Southern. No. 6162 spent over four decades pulling mainline freight trains across the eastern United States until late May 2020, when it was put into storage in Illinois after being marked as surplus by NS. It was donated to KSHCO two weeks later. KSHCO originally had plans to repaint No. 6162 in either L&N or C&O colors. In October 2023, the KSHCO announced that 6162 would be repainted into its as delivered N&W black paint scheme. A few days later, the 6162 was unveiled in its original N&W colors. In March 2026, KSHCO announced that 6162 would be leased to the Cincinnati Eastern Railroad for revenue freight service.
- W.E. Callihan Construction 0-4-0T No. 1. Built between December 1918 and January 1919 (Vulcan works no. 2886), the locomotive was formerly on display in Kenova, West Virginia. In 2024, it was moved to the KSHCO for restoration.

== See also ==
- R.J. Corman Railroad Group
- Kentucky Railway Museum
- Fort Wayne Railroad Historical Society
