= J. H. Hawes Elevator =

- U.S. National Register of Historic Places
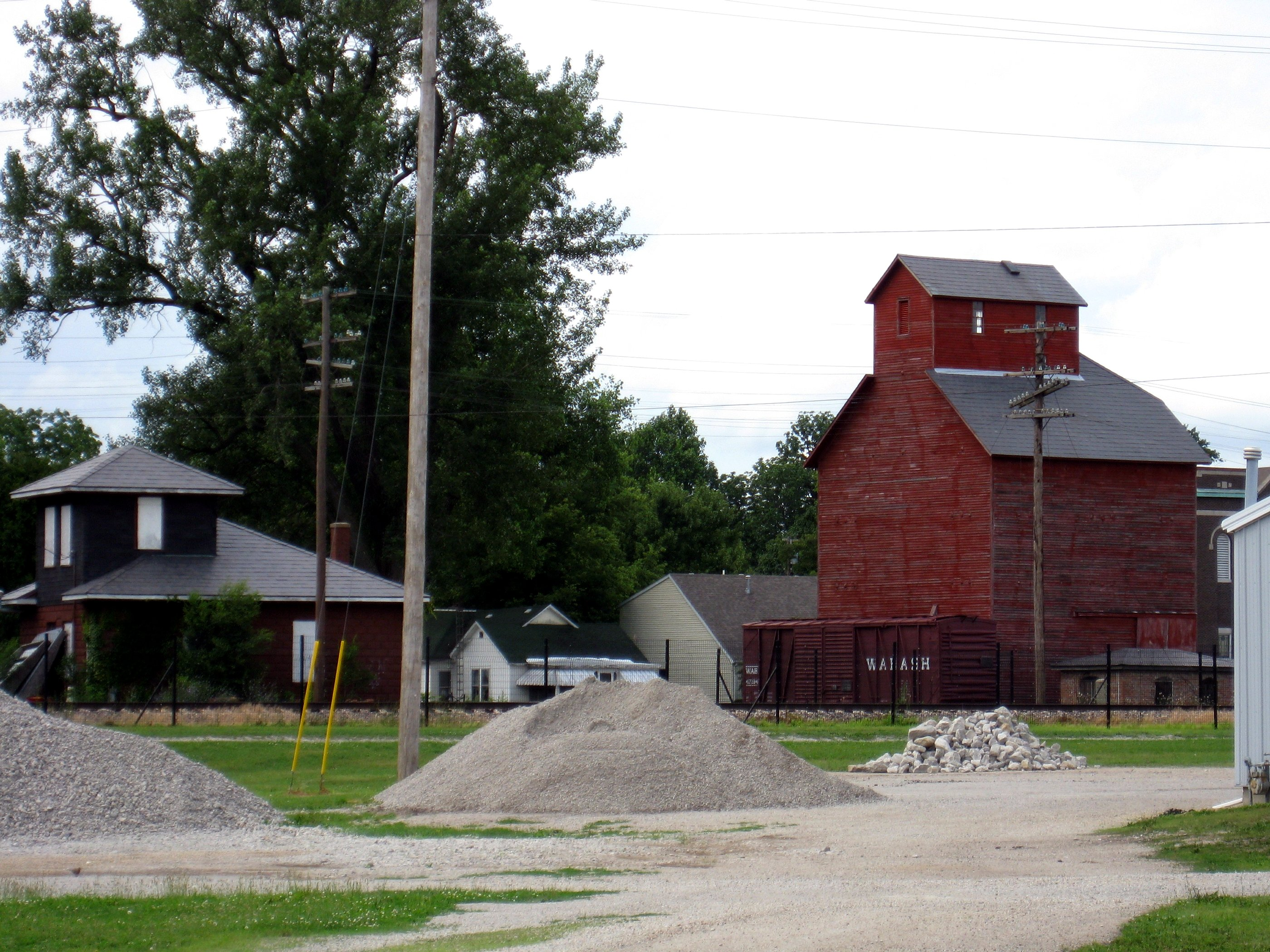
- The elevator in 2008

- Location within Illinois Location within the United States
- Location: 2nd St., Atlanta, Illinois
- Coordinates: 40°15′39″N 89°14′2″W
- Area: less than one acre
- Built by: McIntyre & Wykle
- Architectural style: Wooden grain elevator
- NRHP reference No.: 91000571
- Added to NRHP: May 17, 1991

The J. H. Hawes Elevator is a historic grain elevator located on 2nd Street in Atlanta, Illinois. The elevator was built in 1903 along the Illinois Midland Railroad; it was used to store locally farmed grain before the railroad shipped it to cities such as Peoria, Decatur, and Terre Haute, Indiana. Built by McIntyre and Wykle, the elevator is an example of a studded grain elevator, which uses vertical wooden studs in its walls to form its internal grain bins. The elevator operated until 1975. It was later restored to its original condition and is now a museum.

The elevator was added to the National Register of Historic Places on May 17, 1991. It is the only restored wooden grain elevator on the National Register in Illinois.
