= Aberdeen, Carolina and Western Railway =

Railway in North Carolina

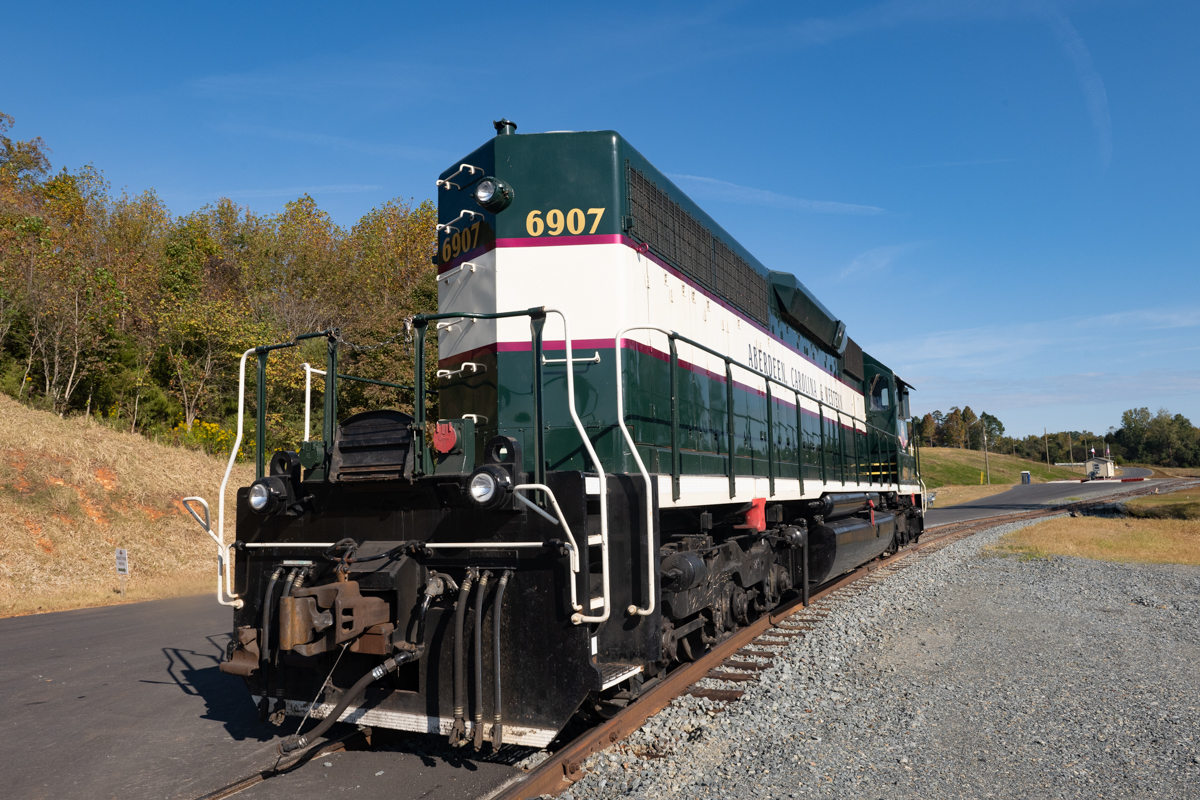
- ACWR 6907 in October 2022

Overview
- Headquarters: Candor, North Carolina
- Reporting mark: ACWR
- Locale: Central North Carolina
- Dates of operation: 1987–present

Technical
- Track gauge: 4 ft 8 1/2 in (1,435 mm) standard gauge
- Length: 140 miles (230 kilometres)

Other
- Website: Aberdeen, Carolina & Western Railway

The Aberdeen, Carolina and Western Railway (reporting mark ACWR) is a short-line railroad running from Aberdeen to Star, North Carolina. It was incorporated in 1987 and operates on a former Norfolk Southern Railway branch line. It also leases track from Norfolk Southern between Charlotte and Gulf, North Carolina. It serves approximately 20 industries, mainly dealing in forest and agricultural products.

== Fleet ==
The ACWR fleet (as of May 2018; not all actively in service in July 2023) consists of the following locomotives:

Number	Type	Built	Notes
100, 101, 103	EMD E9	1955 (#103)	All are A units (Number 103, originally UPRR #955, is recently restored with new magenta and gold paint scheme).
703, 704, 9529, 9582, 9624	EMD GP40-2	1973-1975	All are the variant GP40-2LW (Widecab). All ex-CN, 703 is ex-GO Transit. Units 9529 and 9582 sold to Tren Interoceánico
1386, 1417, 1457	EMD MP15	1975-1982	1386 is the variant MP15DC; Ex-MP. 1417 and 1457 are the variant MP15AC; Ex-UP, nee-SP.
4500, 4501	EMD F7	1950-1951	Both are A units.
5520, 5521, 5526, 5527, 5534, 5536, 5539, 5545, 5548, 5549, 5558-5560	EMD SD60	1989	All are the variant SD60-F with cowl, built by GMD for CN.
6909, 6910, 6918, 6919, 6922, 6925, 6926, 6939	EMD SD40	1969-1971	All are the variant SD40-3, ex-WC, Ex-GCFX, nee-CN
400600	EMD F3	1949	Cabless B unit
271, 276	EMD F9		Former Norfolk Southern business train AB set, rebuilt by NS to GP38-2 components, acquired by ACWR in 2019 and re-painted in magenta and yellow/gold scheme. Ex-B&O (271) and Chicago Great Western (276).
87	GE AC6000CW	1995–2001	Ex-CSX 666, later PRLX 656; converted to a bar under the name "Engine Room ‘87"

== See also ==
- Thoroughbred Shortline Program
