= Hoosier Heritage Port Authority =

Overview
- Headquarters: Noblesville, Indiana
- Reporting mark: HHPA
- Locale: Tipton, Hamilton, and Marion counties in central Indiana
- Dates of operation: 1995–

Technical
- Track gauge: 1,435 mm (4 ft 8 1/2 in) standard gauge
- Length: 37 mi (60 km)

The Hoosier Heritage Port Authority is a quasi-governmental organization in the U.S. state of Indiana. It is the owner of a Heritage railway (reporting mark HHPA), operated by the Indiana Transportation Museum from 1995 to 2015 & currently operated by the Nickel Plate Express since 2018, over former Norfolk Southern trackage from Tipton, Indiana, to Indianapolis, a distance of 37 miles (59.5 km). This trackage is the southernmost section of the former Indianapolis to Michigan City main line operated by several railroad companies since its original construction in the mid-19th Century, the best known being the Nickel Plate.

== Overview ==
The HHPA was first established as the Historic Railroad Multi-Jurisdictional Port Authority (HRMJPA) in 1994, for the purpose of preserving this section of rail corridor that then-owner Norfolk Southern wished to abandon. In 1995, the HRMJPA closed on its purchase of these 37-miles of rail tracks, which are located in Hamilton County and two other Indiana counties. The following year, the City of Indianapolis (Marion County) joined in this entity and its name was changed to become the Hoosier Heritage Port Authority (HHPA).

In 1997, the former NS interchange at Tipton was cut. The far southern section near 10th Street in Indianapolis had also been removed several years earlier. Additionally the interchange with the Indianapolis Belt Railroad where the tracks crossed the CSX double main line were removed by CSX inc. in the spring of 2010. This leaves the system isolated from the national railroad system.

By 2011, only occasional tourist railway trains ran along these tracks, such as the Indiana State Fair Train between Fishers and the State Fairgrounds (near 39th Street and Fall Creek in Indianapolis). However, one of the goals of the HHPA is to eventually establish a commuter rail system using this corridor although it is unlikely any action will be taken as the senate committee had passed a Mass Transit bill for Bus Rapid Transit and busway for the corridor.

In 2019 the rails, ties and ballast south of Forest Park in Noblesville, IN to the terminus of the line have been removed and scrapped. Road crossing still remain, but current plans are to repurpose the line as a multipurpose rails to trails model.

In fall 2020 all remaining rail from the CSX mainline to the end of the Hoosier Heritage Port Authority has been removed as scrap by CSX railroad Maintenance of Way personnel.

== Corridor history ==
This rail corridor, one of the oldest in Indiana, traces its heritage back to the Peru and Indianapolis Railroad Company, which was incorporated on January 19, 1846, to construct a rail line from downtown Indianapolis to the Wabash and Erie Canal at Peru. Construction began at Indianapolis in 1849, reaching Noblesville in 1851, Tipton in 1852, Kokomo in 1853, and finally reaching Peru in the spring of 1854. Reorganized as the Indianapolis, Peru & Chicago Railway Company (IP&C) in 1864, that entity subsequently acquired the Chicago, Cincinnati and Louisville Railroad Company seven years later to complete a unified 161-mile (259 km) route between Indianapolis and Michigan City.

The IP&C was leased by the Wabash, St. Louis and Pacific Railway in 1881, but upon that company's financial collapse five years later it was sold by that line's creditors to the Lake Erie & Western Railroad Company (LE&W) in March 1887. By 1899, the LE&W was under the control of the New York Central System (NYC).

In 1923, the NYC sold the LE&W to the New York, Chicago and St. Louis Railroad, better known by its nickname, the Nickel Plate Road (NKP). On October 16, 1964, the Nickel Plate merged into the Norfolk and Western Railway (N&W), which later became the Norfolk Southern Railway (NS) in 1982.
