= Ravenna, Kentucky =

- City
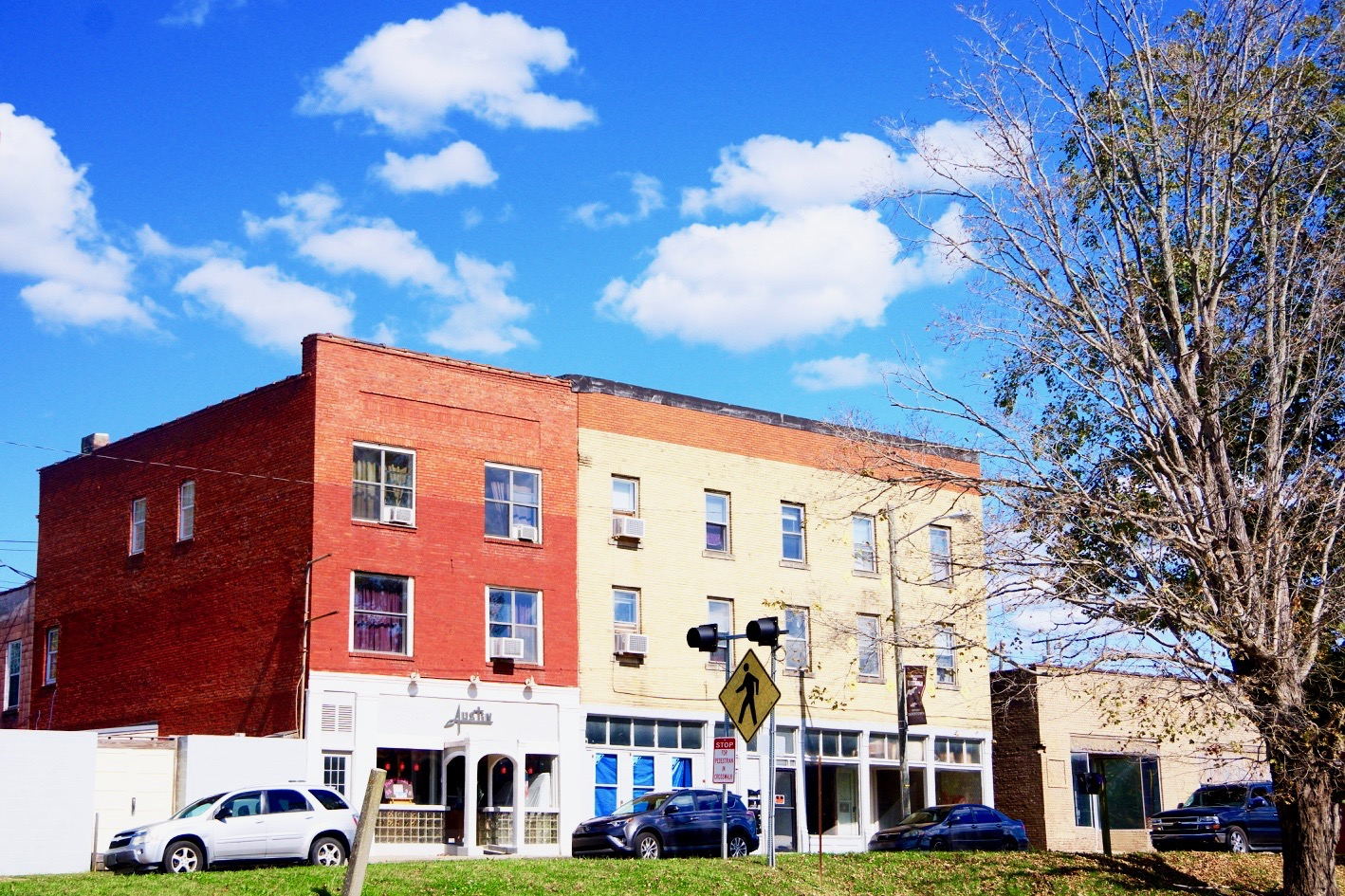
- Businesses along Main Street (KY 52)

- Location of Ravenna in Estill County, Kentucky.
- Coordinates: 37°41′9″N 83°57′5″W
- Country: United States
- State: Kentucky
- County: Estill

Area
  - Total: 0.31 sq mi (0.81 km^{2})
  - Land: 0.31 sq mi (0.81 km^{2})
  - Water: 0 sq mi (0.00 km^{2})
- Elevation: 636 ft (194 m)

Population (2020)
  - Total: 568
  - Density: 1,823.7/sq mi (704.13/km^{2})
- Time zone: UTC-5 (Eastern (EST))
  - Summer (DST): UTC-4 (EDT)
- ZIP code: 40472
- Area code: 606
- FIPS code: 21-64092
- GNIS feature ID: 0514849

Ravenna is a home rule-class city in Estill County, Kentucky, United States. As of the 2020 census, Ravenna had a population of 568.

== History ==
The US Federal Census dated 7 Aug,1820 reflects a town located in Estill Co., KY as "Ravenna", but before it was incorporated, Ravenna was known only as "The Village".

The Louisville & Nashville Railroad was responsible for the name of Ravenna, the building of the shops, yard, office building, passenger and freight station, and many other things that were built for the establishment of a railroad terminal in Estill County just east of the county seat, Irvine. After the completion of the terminal in 1915, the county decided it would call it "Ravenna", which stems from the word "ravine". It was reported by early railroad officials that an Italian foreman and interpreter, with a construction crew of approximately 60 Italian men building the railroad yards, requested that the railroad officials name the station in honor of his birthplace, Ravenna, Italy, and it was so granted by the railroad officials in charge of such matters.

A thriving village sprang up in 1915, when the railroad started construction of its shops; and five years later in 1920, Ravenna was incorporated as a 6th-class City by the Estill County Circuit Court.

In 1924 Ravenna was declared a 5th-class city by an act of the Kentucky State Legislature due to an increase in population. This also entitled them to have a mayor, six councilmen and city clerk, and fire and police departments. By this time in its history, Ravenna had become an almost entirely white city. In 1920, hundreds of "black railroad workers were forced to leave their jobs and their community

Ravenna is home of the local VFW Post #8019; a National Guard armory that is home to C Company, 1–149th Infantry (M), 149th BDE; and the Estill County Veterans Memorial in Ravenna's Veterans Memorial Park.

=== Ravenna Tile ===
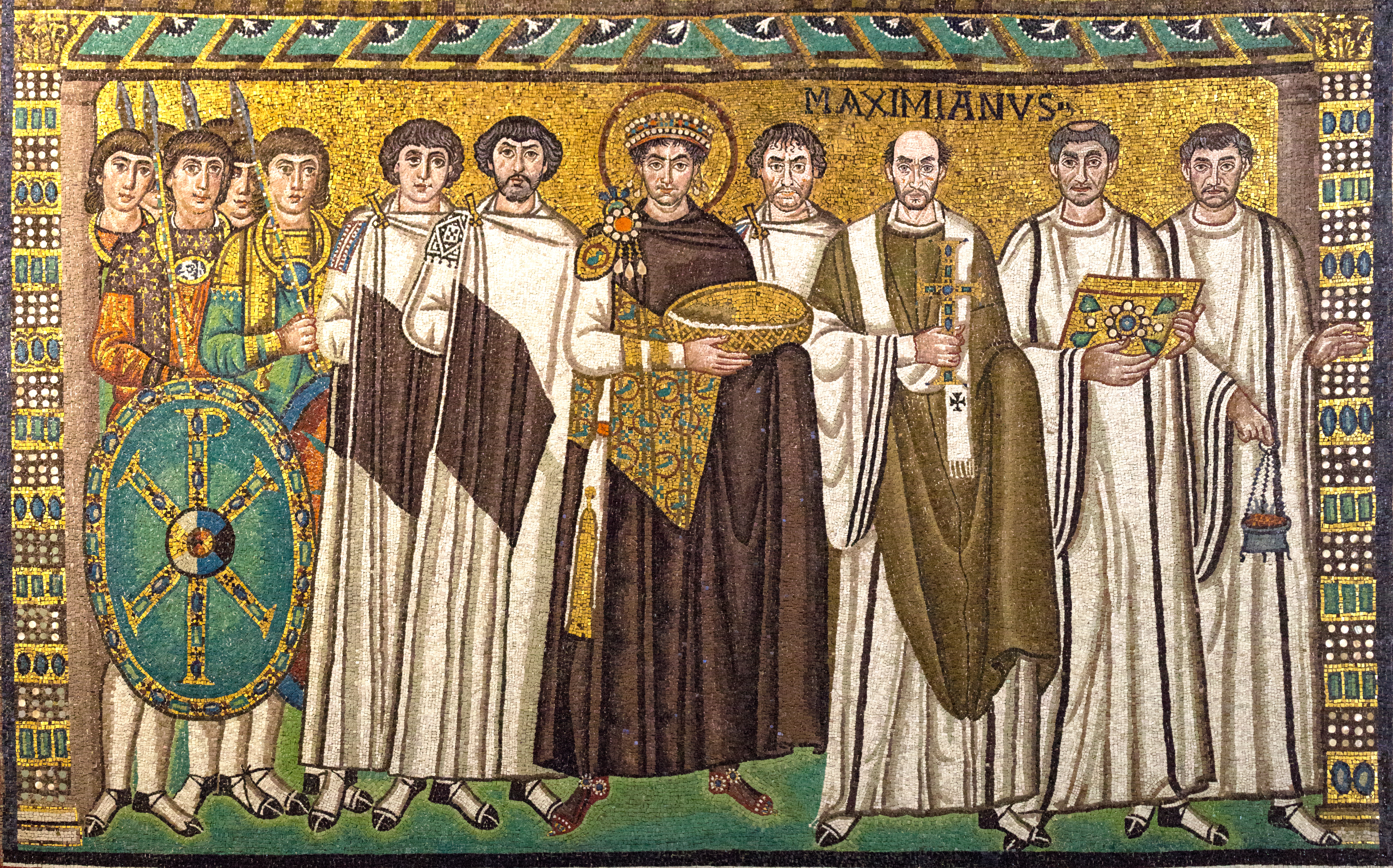
Original from which the Ravenna Tile was copied

In order to express sympathy following the tornado disaster of June 9, 1961, the Italian city of Ravenna donated a design on a glazed tile to Ravenna, Kentucky. A copy of a Late Antique mosaic from the Basilica of San Vitale, the tile depicts Roman Emperor Justinian I with Maximianus, Bishop of Ravenna. The tile is displayed at the city hall.

== Geography ==
Ravenna is located near the center of Estill County at 37°41′9″N 83°57′5″W (37.685772, −83.951399), in the valley of the Kentucky River. It is bordered to the northwest by the city of Irvine, the county seat. Kentucky Route 52 passes through Ravenna as Main Street and Third Street, leading east and southeast 24 miles (39 km) to Beattyville, and leading west 20 miles (32 km) to Richmond.

According to the United States Census Bureau, Ravenna has a total area of 0.3 square miles (0.8 km^{2}), all of it land.

=== Climate ===
The climate in this area is characterized by hot, humid summers and generally mild to cool winters. According to the Köppen Climate Classification system, Ravenna has a humid subtropical climate, abbreviated "Cfa" on climate maps.

== Demographics ==
Historical population
Census	Pop.	Note	%±
1930	1,189		—
1940	1,098		−7.7%
1950	979		−10.8%
1960	921		−5.9%
1970	784		−14.9%
1980	793		1.1%
1990	804		1.4%
2000	693		−13.8%
2010	605		−12.7%
2020	568		−6.1%
U.S. Decennial Census

As of the census of 2000, there were 693 people, 301 households, and 207 families residing in the city. The population density was 1,873.0 inhabitants per square mile (723.2/km^{2}). There were 323 housing units at an average density of 873.0 per square mile (337.1/km^{2}). The racial makeup of the city was 97.55% White, 0.58% African American, 0.72% Native American, and 1.15% from two or more races. Hispanic or Latino of any race were 0.43% of the population.

There were 301 households, out of which 25.9% had children under the age of 18 living with them, 50.8% were married couples living together, 15.3% had a female householder with no husband present, and 31.2% were non-families. 29.6% of all households were made up of individuals, and 16.6% had someone living alone who was 65 years of age or older. The average household size was 2.30 and the average family size was 2.80.

In the city, the population was spread out, with 20.5% under the age of 18, 9.4% from 18 to 24, 28.0% from 25 to 44, 24.2% from 45 to 64, and 17.9% who were 65 years of age or older. The median age was 39 years. For every 100 females, there were 84.3 males. For every 100 females age 18 and over, there were 82.5 males.

The median income for a household in the citywas $30,583, and the median income for a family was $33,438. Males had a median income of $25,833 versus $17,813 for females. The per capita income for the city was $14,089. About 16.0% of families and 17.6% of the population were below the poverty line, including 21.5% of those under age 18 and 12.0% of those age 65 or over.

== Noted natives ==
- Kevin Richardson, member of the Backstreet Boys, attended and graduated Ravenna Elementary School

== See also ==
- Other places named Ravenna
