= Rhode Island Locomotive Works =

Coordinates: 41.829636°N 71.429909°W

Rhode Island Locomotive Works was a steam locomotive manufacturing company in Providence, Rhode Island. The factory produced more than 3,400 locomotives between 1867 and 1906, when the plant's locomotive production was shut down. At its peak, the locomotive works employed about 1,400 men who could produce some 250 locomotives a year.

== Origins ==
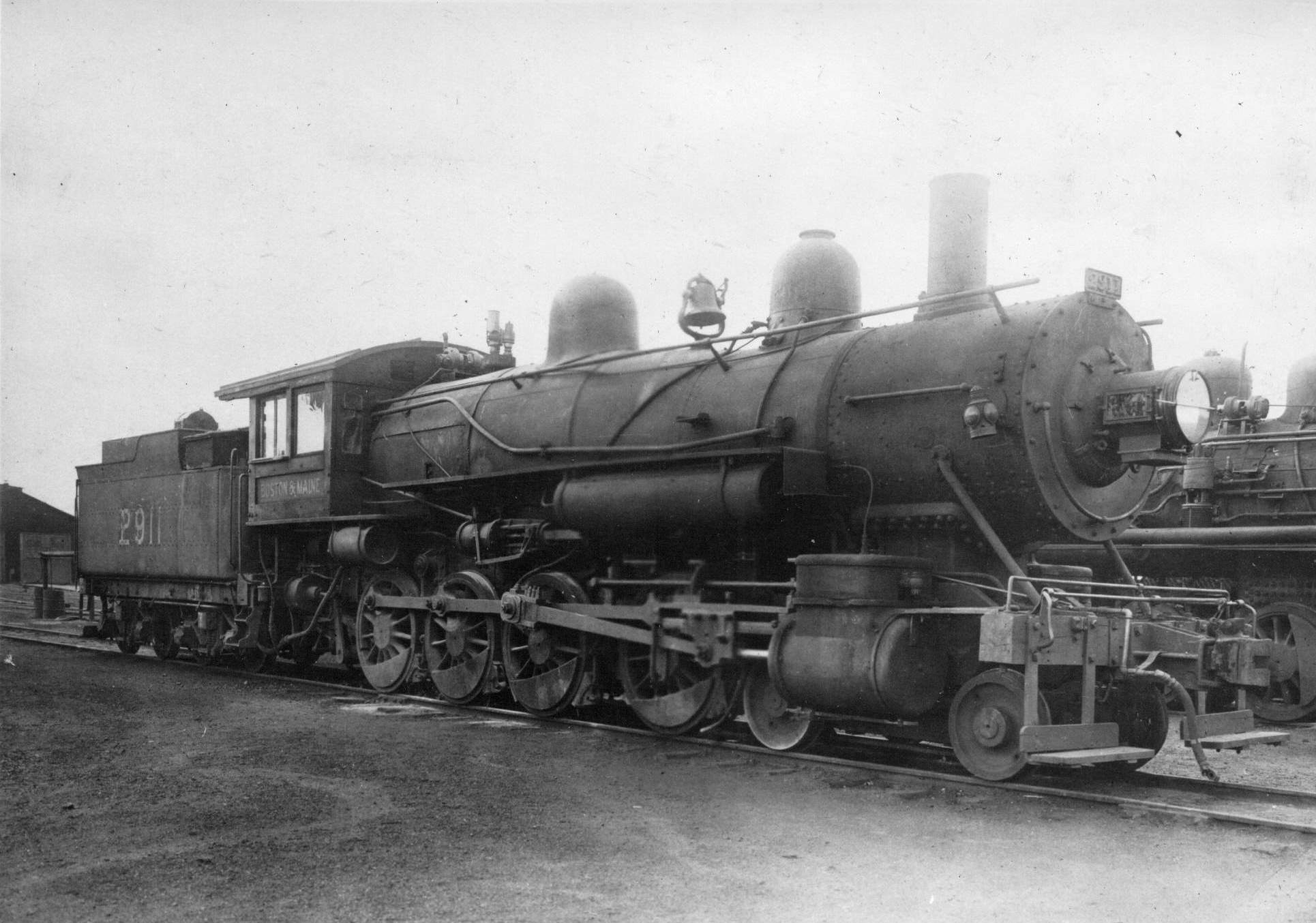
Built by Rhode Island Locomotive Works in 1900, Boston & Maine Railroad locomotive #2911 is seen at Billerica, Massachusetts, in 1920. From the Joseph A. Smith Collection.

The Rhode Island Locomotive Works was established in 1865 by Earl Philip Mason, Sr. The company was later run by his three sons: Charles Felix Mason was president, Arthur Livingstone Mason was vice-president and Earl Philip Mason, Jr. was secretary and treasurer. Joseph Lythgoe was the superintendent of the locomotive works.

The company was located on Hemlock Street in Providence. From 1866 to 1899, it produced some 3,400 steam locomotives.

Earl Philip Mason, Jr. was born in Providence on August 5, 1848, and died at San Antonio, Texas, on March 17, 1901. He was the son of Earl Philip and Lucy Ann (Larcher) Mason. He received his early education at Mowry & Goff's School and at the Highland Military Academy in Worcester, Massachusetts. He entered Brown University in 1868 and took a special two-year course but did not graduate. He then went to Germany to study at Heidelberg University. After joining the Rhode Island Locomotive Works in 1872, he remained with the company until 1895, eventually becoming vice-president. He married on April 18, 1872, at New York City, to Mary Elizabeth Raymond, (born September 10, 1849, in New York City and died on June 13, 1897, in Morristown, New Jersey). She was the daughter of Henry Jarvis Raymond, the founder of The New York Times; and Juliette Weaver.

== Merger ==
In 1901, the Rhode Island Locomotive Works merged with seven other locomotive manufacturers to form the American Locomotive Company (ALCO), headquartered in Schenectady, New York. The Rhode Island works, which had already begun to diversify, built a line of automobiles and trucks from 1906 until 1913.

== Present day ==
The old Rhode Island Locomotive Works plant, along with the adjoining Nicholson File and United States Rubber Company buildings, was the center of a $333 million commercial and residential redevelopment project that went bankrupt in 2010. In 2013, The Foundry Associates, L.P., a privately owned real estate investment firm, acquired the property for $19.05 million and completed the development. Today it is an active office park with business tenants like United Natural Foods (UNFI), Equity National Title, RI Commerce Corporation, Brewster Thornton Architects, MMID Product Development and Fuss and O'Neill.

== Preserved Rhode Island locomotives ==
This is a list of locomotives built by the Providence plant before the ALCO merger that have been preserved.

Serial no.	Type (Whyte notation)	Build date	Operational owner(s)	Disposition
1595	2-8-0	March 1886	Colorado and Southern Railway #60	Anderson Park, Idaho Springs, Colorado
1877	0-6-0	October 1887	Minneapolis, Sault Ste. Marie and Atlantic Railway #38, Minneapolis, St. Paul and Sault Ste. Marie Railway #321, rebuilt to 0-6-0T and renumbered #X-90, (since rebuilt back to 0-6-0)	Manitowoc, Wisconsin
2943	0-4-4T	July 1893	Lake Street Elevated Railroad #9	National Museum of Transportation, Kirkwood, Missouri
3030	0-6-0T	December 1894	Mathieson Alkali Works #2	Saltville Museum, Saltville, Virginia
3147	2-6-0	November 1899	Wabash Railroad #573	National Museum of Transportation, Kirkwood, Missouri

This is a list of locomotives built by ALCO at the facility that have been preserved.

Serial no.	Type (Whyte notation)	Build date	Operational owner(s)	Disposition
41174	0-6-0	August 1906	Wabash Railroad #534	Fort Wayne Railroad Historical Society, New Haven, Indiana
	2-6-2	1908	South Manchuria Railway Purei class, China Railway PL1 22	Shenyang Railway Museum, Shenyang, Liaoning, China
