= Wabash 534 =

Preserved WAB class B-7 0-6-0 locomotive

Wabash Railroad 534
Type and origin
- Power type: Steam
- Builder: American Locomotive Company (Rhode Island Works)
- Serial number: 41174
- Build date: August 1906
Specifications
- Configuration
  - Whyte: 0-6-0
  - UIC: C
- Gauge: 4 ft 8 1/2 in (1,435 mm)
- Driver dia.: 52 in (1,300 mm)
- Fuel type: Coal
- Boiler pressure: 185 psi (1,280 kPa)
- Cylinders: Two, outside
- Cylinder size: 21 in × 26 in (530 mm × 660 mm)
- Valve gear: Stephenson
Career
- Operators: Wabash Railroad; Lake Erie and Fort Wayne Railroad
- Class: B-7
- Numbers: WAB 534; LE&FW 1
- Official name: Nancy
- Retired: March 1957
- Current owner: Fort Wayne Railroad Historical Society
- Disposition: Stored, pending restoration

Wabash Railroad 534, also known as Nancy, is the sole survivor of the B-7 class 0-6-0 "Switcher" type steam locomotive, built in August 1906 by the American Locomotive Company (ALCO). It was used by the Wabash (WAB) as a yard switcher, until it was sold in 1954 to the Lake Erie and Fort Wayne Railroad (LE&FW) as No. 1. After being retired in 1957, it was donated to Swinney Park in Fort Wayne, Indiana for static display. In 1984, it was purchased by the Fort Wayne Railroad Historical Society (FWRHS), which removed the locomotive from the park and relocated it to their locomotive shop in New Haven. The locomotive is currently stored awaiting a restoration to operational condition while serving as an educational tool for the younger FWRHS members, as of 2026.

== History ==
=== Revenue service ===
From the late 1880s to the early 1920s, the Wabash Railroad, a class 1 railroad that lied as far east as New York state and as far west as Iowa, ordered multiple classes of 0-6-0 switcher locomotives to add to their locomotive roster. One of the classes was the B-7 class, with forty-two of them being built by the Baldwin Locomotive Works (BLW) of Philadelphia, Pennsylvania and the American Locomotive Company's (ALCO) Rhode Island Locomotive Works between 1906 and 1912, being numbered 525-566, and No. 534 was one of the locomotives built by Alco in August 1906. The locomotive was used by the Wabash for shuttling and simmering various rolling stock between several terminals throughout the states of Illinois and Missouri.

As the railroad was dieselizing their locomotive roster, many of the B-7 class 0-6-0s were either sold for scrap or sold to smaller short-line railroads, and No. 534 was sold in 1954 to one of the Wabash's subsidiaries, the Lake Erie and Fort Wayne Railroad (LE&FW) for $1,500, and it was subsequently renumbered to 1. The LE&FW reassigned the switcher to pull light-weight freight trains out of steel mills in Taylor Street near Fort Wayne, Indiana. By the late 1950s, however, the LE&FW discontinued steam operations, and No. 1 completed its last revenue freight assignment in March 1957 before its fire was dropped for the final time.

=== Preservation ===
A group of area railroaders convinced the LE&FW to donate No. 1 to Swinney Park in Fort Wayne for static display, since it was one of very few Wabash steam locomotives left at the time. On May 8, 1957, after being repainted, No. 1 was lifted onto a flatbed by a Nickel Plate Road 300-ton steam crane, and then it was moved by truck downtown to its new display site. No. 1 would spend the next eighteen years on static display in Swinny Park in front of Wabash caboose No. 2543. In 1984, the Fort Wayne Railroad Historical Society (FWRHS), a non-profit organization based in nearby New Haven, acquired No. 1 and the caboose as additions to their collection of vintage railroad equipment, and volunteers arrived in Swinney Park that same year to remove the locomotive and caboose from their display site by truck. Upon arrival of New Haven, No. 1 remained sidelined for a future restoration that would revert its identity to Wabash No. 534, but that would not come to fruition for years, since the FWRHS would concentrate their efforts on Nickel Plate Road 2-8-4 No. 765, and for a short time, Chesapeake and Ohio 2-8-4 No. 2716.

Beginning in 2009, No. 534 was moved inside the FWRHS's main engine house, and some of their youngest members began cosmetically stabilizing the locomotive for a cleaner appearance, and to get rid of the variety of rust spots the locomotive had been collecting while being stored outdoors over the years. The smokebox was full of rusty crumbs from the smokebox door’s insulation, and rodents and other small animals had to be evicted from inside the locomotive, so that the crew would proceed with the work. Progress was slow, but still productive, since by 2013, the locomotive's boiler received a much smoother surface. An ultrasound survey of the locomotive was completed in 2021, with an estimated cost of 1.4 million dollars to restore No. 534 to operating condition. Work slowly continued to proceed with No. 534's restoration for operational purposes. The tender remains deteriorated without any trucks, the cab was completely refurbished and reinstalled onto the locomotive, and both the builder's plate and the original Wabash number plate were remade. One of the reasons why this is a slow process is because No. 534 is meant to serve as an educational tool for the youngest members of the FWRHS, since most of them aren't legally of age to help work with No. 765. The date of No. 534 ever steaming up again has yet to be determined, with the locomotive waiting in the wings while Fort Wayne focuses their attention on New York Central 3001. As of 2026, FWRHS is evaluating No. 534 to determine the path forward for the locomotive.

== Historical significance ==
No. 534 is the sole survivor of the B-7 class, and it is one of only two preserved steam locomotives that were ever used by the Wabash. The only other survivor is 2-6-0 No. 573, which is homed at the National Museum of Transportation in St. Louis.

== Other preserved 0-6-0 switcher locomotives ==
- Central Railroad of New Jersey 113
- Canadian National 7470
- United States Army 4039
- Union Pacific 4466
- Soo Line 353
- Southern Pacific 1215
- Southern Railway 1643
