= National New York Central Railroad Museum =

Museum in Elkhart, Indiana, U.S.

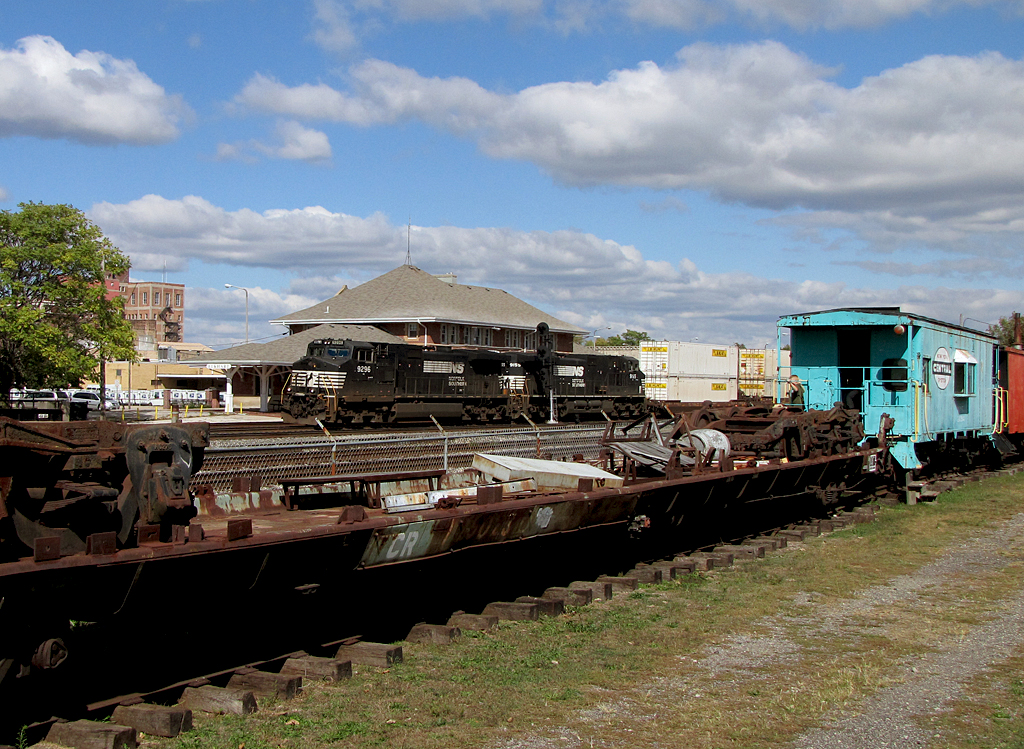
- Some Norfolk Southern intermodal trains pass between the museum and Elkhart Amtrak station
- Established: 1987
- Location: Elkhart, Indiana
- Coordinates: 41.6799°N 85.9709°W
- Type: Railroad
- Director: Brent Holaway
- Website: nycrrmuseum.org

The National New York Central Railroad Museum (reporting mark NNYX) is a railroad museum located in Elkhart, Indiana dedicated to the preservation of the New York Central Railroad (NYC).

The museum includes several outdoor equipment displays, indoor model railroads, artifacts from the NYC and other railroad related exhibits including educational displays pertaining to the history of railroading. The museum is currently expanding its dedication to the preservation of both local and national railroad heritage. The museum consists of a modified NYC 20th Century Limited train set and freight house built by the Lake Shore & Michigan Southern Railway (LS&MS) in 1907.

== History ==
Elkhart was a vital link between East and West during the growth of railroading in the U.S. In 1833 the LS&MS built a line through town; it was later acquired by the NYC in 1914.

The museum is situated opposite the Norfolk Southern Railway (NS) east–west main line; NS freight trains pass approximately every 15 minutes. Amtrak's Elkhart Station is also within walking distance; daily service is provided by the Lake Shore Limited (Chicago-Boston/New York) and Capitol Limited (Chicago-Washington, D.C.).

The bulk of the museum's collection & the museum site was originally owned by the Lakeshore Railroad Historical Foundation (LRHF), A non-profit rail preservation group based in Elkhart. The group subsequently donated their collection & sold the property to the city in early 1987. The museum was founded in 1987. After several years of planning and prep, the museum opened to the public on May 1, 1989.

On October 9, 2024, the museum announced a partnership with the Fort Wayne Railroad Historical Society to revitalize the museum. Plans call for an assessment of the collection and select pieces being de-accessed. Following the de-accession, a new master plan will be developed for the outdoor equipment displays with the goal of positioning the museum as an anchor for neighborhood redevelopment.

== Equipment ==
=== Locomotives ===
Locomotive details
Number	Image	Type	Model	Built	Builder	Status	Description
4085		Diesel	E-8A	1953	Electro-Motive Diesel	Display	Built for the New York Central. No. 4085 lead locomotive of the eastbound 20th Century Limited when it left Chicago, Illinois for final run on December 2, 1967. Purchased by the National New York Central Railroad Museum from New Jersey Rail Operations in 1987.
4882		Electric	GG1	1939	PRR Altoona Works	Display	Built for the Pennsylvania Railroad. To Penn Central in 1968. Sold by Penn Central to New Jersey Transit in 1976. Sold by New Jersey Transit to New Jersey Rail Operations. Purchased by the National New York Central Railroad Museum from New Jersey Rail Operations in 1987. One of the fastest locomotives of its day, reaching speeds up to 100 mph (160 km/h); designed with the assistance of Raymond Loewy.
15		Electric	Interurban	1926	Pullman Standard	Display	Built for the Chicago South Shore & South Bend Railroad. Sold by Chicago South Shore & South Bend Railroad to National Park Service in 1984. Donated to the National New York Central Railroad Museum by the National Park Service in 2002.

=== Cabooses ===
Caboose details
Number	Image	Type	Built	Builder	Status	Description
19211		End Cupola Caboose	1910	New York Central Railroad	Display	Built for the New York Central. Donated to the National New York Central Railroad Museum by Al Nakon in 1989.
21084		Bay Window Caboose	1963	New York Central Railroad	Display	Built for the New York Central Railroad.
18136		Transfer Caboose	1967	New York Central Railroad	Display	Built for the New York Central Railroad, Converted from a 1949 boxcar.
21230		Bay Window Caboose	1974	Fruit Growers Express	Display	Built for Conrail, used in wreck train service. Donated to the National New York Central Railroad Museum by Conrail in 1997.
75		End Cupola Caboose	19??	American Car and Foundry or Atchison, Topeka and Santa Fe Railway	Display	Built for the Atchison, Topeka and Santa Fe Railway. Sold to the Indiana Harbor Belt Railroad. Purchased by the Lakeshore Railroad Historical Foundation in 1983 or 1984. Donated to the National New York Central Railroad Museum in 1986 or 1987.
10		Caboose	19??	Unknown	Display	Built for the Minneapolis, Northfield and Southern Railway. Purchased by the Lakeshore Railroad Historical Foundation in 1983 or 1984. Donated to the National New York Central Railroad Museum in 1986 or 1987.

=== Passenger cars ===
Passenger cars details
Number	Image	Type	Builder	Built	Status	Description
5104		RPO	1914	Standard Steel Car Company	Display	Built for the Michigan Central Railroad and numbered 1016. Renumbered 5104 by the New York Central Railroad, converted for work train service in the 1950s. Purchased by the Lakeshore Railroad Historical Foundation in 1996 & moved to the museum.
2691		Heavyweight Coach	1914	Standard Steel Car Company	Display	Named Elkhart River. Built for the Illinois Central Railroad. Purchased by Robert Spaugh & Donated to the National New York Central Railroad Museum in 1987. Painted in NYC paint, Used as exhibit car.
2694		Heavyweight Coach	1914	Standard Steel Car Company	Display	Named St. Joseph River. Built for the Illinois Central Railroad. Purchased by Robert Spaugh & Donated to the National New York Central Railroad Museum in 1987. Painted in NYC paint, Used to house the museum's archives.
454		Observation	1937	Budd Company	Static Display	Named City of Elkhart. Built for the Rock Island Railroad and originally named Minnesota. Purchased by Robert Spaugh, Sold to the City of Elkhart in 1987. Painted in NYC paint.
953		Dining	1949	Pullman Standard	Display	Built for the New Haven Railroad as a grill-dining car. Converted for wreck train service. Donated to the National New York Central Railroad Museum by Conrail in 1997.
45710		BM-70K RPO	1920s	PRR Altoona Works	Display	Built for the Pennsylvania Railroad and numbered 5710. Converted to wreck train service and renumbered 45710. Donated to the National New York Central Railroad Museum by Conrail in 1997.

=== Freight cars ===
Freight cars details
Number	Image	Type	Built	Builder	Status	Description
16039		Tank car	1952	General American Tank Car Corp.	Display	Built for the New York Central. Donated to the National New York Central Railroad Museum by Sturgis Iron and Metal in 2006.
288121		Boxcar	1957	Unknown	Display	Built for the Baltimore & Ohio Railroad. Painted in NYC Century Green with City of Elkhart and National New York Central Railroad Museum logos on it.
288257		Boxcar	1957	Unknown	Display	Built for the Baltimore & Ohio Railroad.
38662		Reefer	1940s	Unknown	Display	Built for the Milwaukee Road.
38794		Reefer	1940s	Unknown	Display	Built for the Milwaukee Road.
499656		X26 Boxcar	1910s	PRR Altoona Works	Display	Built for the Pennsylvania Railroad.
		X26 Boxcar	1910s	PRR Altoona Works	Display	Built for the Pennsylvania Railroad as a X26 Boxcar. Converted into Idler car following fire for NYC X-28 Crane, Donated to the National New York Central Railroad Museum in 1991.
725220		Flat car	19??	Merchants Despatch	Display	Built for Merchants Despatch. Donated to the National New York Central Railroad Museum by Norfolk Southern in 2007.
725023		Flat car	19??	Merchants Despatch	Display	Built for Merchants Despatch. Donated to the National New York Central Railroad Museum by Norfolk Southern in 2007.

=== Other equipment ===
Special use details
Number	Image	Type	Built	Builder	Status	Description
X-13		250-ton Wrecking Crane	1946	Industrial Brownhoist	Display	Built for the New York Central Railroad, based in the NYC Harmon Yard in Croton-on-Harmon, New York. Donated to the National New York Central Railroad Museum by Conrail in 1997, used as a switcher to move equipment on the museum property in the 1990s and 2000s.
X-28		150-ton Wrecking Crane	1920s	Unknown	Display	Built for the New York Central Railroad. Donated to the National New York Central Railroad Museum in 1991.
504472		Idler Car	19??	Unknown	Display	Built for the New York Central Railroad. Idler car for NYC X-13 Crane, Donated to the National New York Central Railroad Museum by Conrail in 1997.
45507		Idler Car	19??	Unknown	Display	Built for the New York Central Railroad. Donated to the National New York Central Railroad Museum by Conrail in 1997.

=== Former locomotives and equipment ===
Equipment details
Number	Images	Type	Model	Built	Builder	Status	Owner	Description
3001		Steam	4-8-2	1940	American Locomotive Company	Awaiting restoration	Fort Wayne Railroad Historical Society	The largest surviving example of the NYC's modern steam power technology; only surviving L-3a class Mohawk; one of two surviving NYC 4-8-2 engines; one of the fastest locomotives of its time; primarily designed for mountain grades, it hauled passengers at speeds up to 90 MPH along the NYC's "Water Level Route" in the state of New York. Acquired by the Lakeshore Railroad Historical Foundation (LRHF) in 1984 & moved to Elkhart. In 1986 or 1987, the LRHF leased the locomotive to the City of Elkhart for a term of 100 years. In September 2023, the locomotive was acquired by the Fort Wayne Railroad Historical Society, with intention to move the locomotive to New Haven, Indiana to undergo restoration to operating condition. In September 2026, the locomotive was successfully transported to the FWRHS.
3042		Auxiliary Water Tender	None	1940	American Locomotive Company	Awaiting restoration	Fort Wayne Railroad Historical Society	Originally built for NYC L-3b "Mohawk" 3042. Retired by the NYC in September 1953, locomotive scrapped in October 1953. Tender saved by NYC for non-revenue service, converted into diesel fuel tank car. Purchased by Ross Rowland for the American Freedom Train in 1975. Used as water tender for Reading 2101 for the American Freedom Train and the Chessie Steam Special from 1975 to 1979. Damaged in a Roundhouse fire in Silver Grove, Kentucky along with 2101 on March 6, 1979. Sold to Bob Spaugh in the 1980s. Donated by Spaugh to the National New York Central Railroad Museum in 1986 or 1987, Displayed behind New York Central 3001. Sold to the Fort Wayne Railroad Historical Society in September 2023. Successfully transported to New Haven, Indiana along with 3001.
902		Covered Hopper car	19??	Unknown	Unknown	Stored	Fort Wayne Railroad Historical Society	Previously owned by Lonestar Cement. Donated to National New York Central Railroad Museum by Lonestar Cement in the 1990s or early 2000s. Donated to FWRHS by City of Elkhart in 2026. Successfully transported to New Haven, Indiana along with 3001.
030		Idler Car	None	1920s	New York Central	Scrapped	None	Built for the New York Central Railroad. Sold to Metro-North Railroad and renumbered 030. Donated by Metro North to the National New York Central Railroad Museum along with steam crane X-28 in 1991. Scrapped by the National New York Central Railroad Museum in the 2000s.

== Interior displays ==
- Model railroads
- NYC memorabilia

== See also ==
- NYC Mohawk
- 20th Century Limited
- List of heritage railroads in the United States
