= New York Central 3001 =

Preserved NYC L-3 class 4-8-2 locomotive

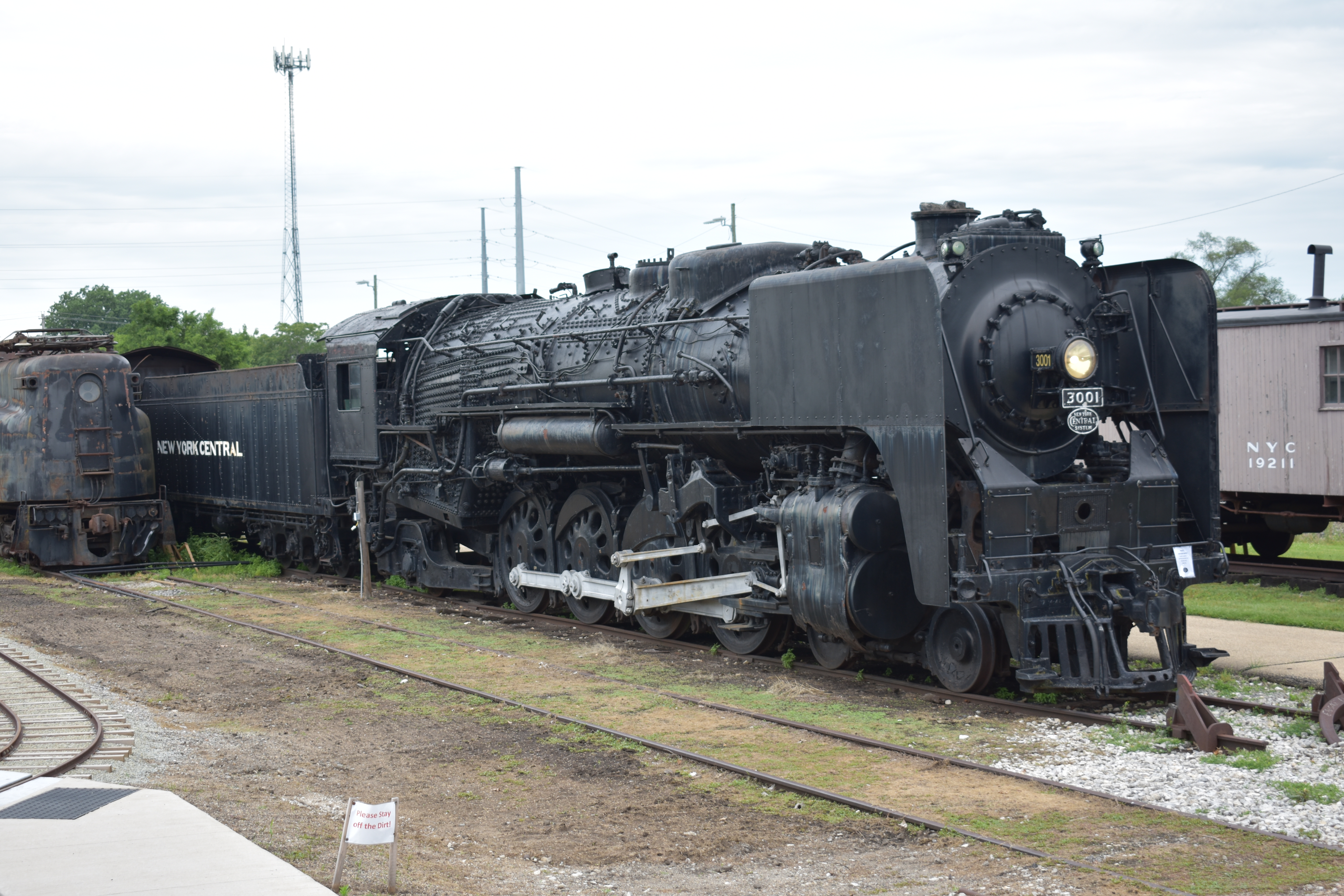
- No. 3001 on display at the National New York Central Railroad Museum in Elkhart, Indiana, on June 20, 2025.
Type and origin
- Power type: Steam
- Designer: Paul W. Kiefer
- Builder: American Locomotive Company (Schenectady Works)
- Serial number: 69338
- Build date: October 1940
Specifications
- Configuration
  - Whyte: 4-8-2
  - UIC: 2′D1′ h2
- Gauge: 4 ft 8 1/2 in (1,435 mm)
- Leading dia.: 33 in (838 mm)
- Driver dia.: 69 in (1,753 mm)
- Trailing dia.: 44 in (1,118 mm)
- Wheelbase: 95 ft 11.5 in (29,248 mm)
- Length: 109 ft 6.5 in (33,388 mm)
- Width: 11 ft 0.875 in (3,375 mm)
- Height: 14 ft 11.5 in (4,559 mm)
- Axle load: 66,100 lb (30.0 t)
- Adhesive weight: 264,400 lb (119.9 t)
- Loco weight: 398,000 lb (180.5 t)
- Tender weight: 374,200 lb (169.7 t)
- Total weight: 772,200 lb (350.3 t)
- Tender type: Rectangular, Water-bottom
- Fuel type: Coal
- Fuel capacity: 43 t (95,000 lb)
- Water cap.: 15,500 US gal (59,000 L; 12,900 imp gal)
- Sandbox cap.: 2,700 lb (1,200 kg)
- Firebox
  - Grate area: 75.3 sq ft (7.00 m^{2})
- Boiler: 94 in (2,388 mm)
- Boiler pressure: 250 psi (1.72 MPa)
- Feedwater heater: Worthington 5 1/2 SA Heaters
- Heating surface
  - Firebox: 373 sq ft (34.7 m^{2})
  - Tubes: 7,278 sq ft (676.1 m^{2})
  - Flues: 44,948 sq ft (4,175.8 m^{2})
  - Tubes and flues: 4,248 sq ft (394.7 m^{2})
- Superheater
  - Type: Type E, 100-unit
  - Heating area: 2,080 sq ft (193 m^{2})
- Cylinders: Two, outside
- Cylinder size: 25.5 in × 30 in (648 mm × 762 mm)
- Valve gear: Baker
- Valve type: Piston valves
- Train heating: Yes
- Loco brake: Air
- Train brakes: Air
- Couplers: Knuckle
Performance figures
- Maximum speed: 80 mph (130 km/h)
- Power output: 4,120 hp (3,070 kW) at 58 mph (93 km/h)
- Tractive effort: 60,100 lbf (267.34 kN)
- Factor of adh.: 4.40
Career
- Operators: New York Central Railroad
- Class: L-3a
- Number in class: 2nd of 25
- Numbers: NYC 3001; T&P 909
- Official name: Mohawk
- Delivered: October 1940
- First run: October 1940
- Retired: February 1957
- Current owner: Fort Wayne Railroad Historical Society
- Disposition: Undergoing restoration to operating condition

New York Central 3001 is a preserved 4-8-2 Mohawk ("Mountain") type steam locomotive, built in October 1940 by American Locomotive Company (ALCO) of Schenectady, New York as a member of the L-3a class for the New York Central Railroad (NYC). Normally known as Mountain types, the NYC 4-8-2 steam locomotives were dubbed as Mohawk types after the Mohawk River, which ran alongside NYC's famed Water Level Route. Built for dual-service work, No. 3001 was used to haul both freight and passenger trains on the NYC system until being retired in February 1957.

Instead of being sold for scrap, No. 3001 was sold to the Texas and Pacific Railway (T&P), where it was outfitted to masquerade as T&P No. 909 and donated to the Museum of the American Railroad (MARR) in Dallas, Texas. In the mid-1980s, No. 3001 was acquired by the Lakeshore Railroad Historical Foundation and was subsequently donated to the National New York Central Railroad Museum (NNYX) in Elkhart, Indiana. It is the largest modern mainline NYC steam locomotive still in existence and is one of two surviving New York Central Mohawks; the other, No. 2933, is currently on display at the National Museum of Transportation in St. Louis, Missouri.

From the 1980s to the 2010s, there were several attempts to restore No. 3001 back to operation, but these never came to fruition. In October 2024, it was announced that the Fort Wayne Railroad Historical Society (FWRHS) had acquired No. 3001 and made plans to restore it to operating condition. Once completed, the Mohawk will become the only operational New York Central steam locomotive in the world, and the first NYC locomotive to operate since the end of steam on the railroad. It will be the first operational 4-8-2 locomotive in excursion service in the United States since the retirement of Frisco No. 1522 in 2002.

== History ==
=== Background and design ===
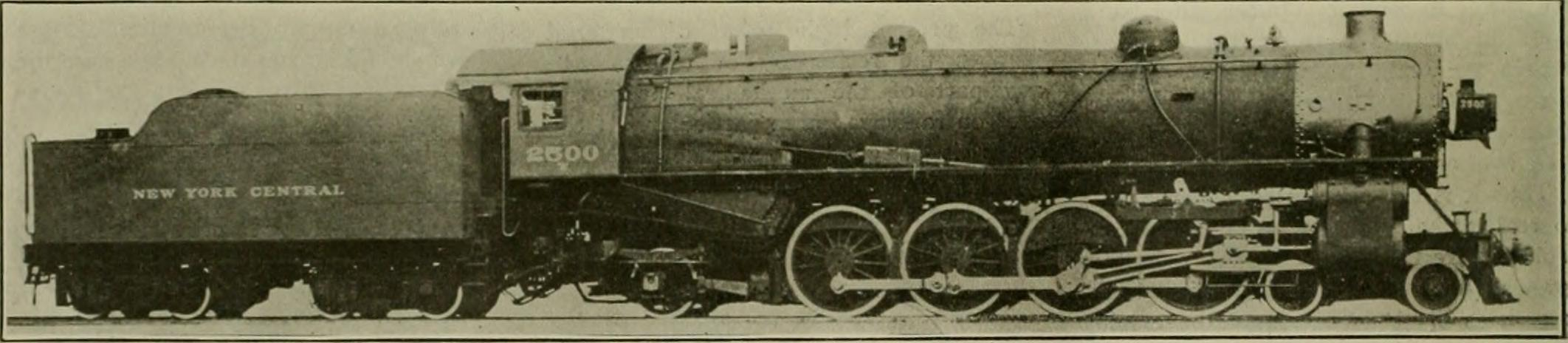
No. 2500, the first of the NYC Mohawk locomotive built in 1916.

Between 1916 and 1930, the New York Central Railroad (NYC) ordered L-1 and L-2 4-8-2 steam locomotives, replacing the 4-6-2 Pacifics for use on fast mainline freight trains. While the other railroads referred to the 4-8-2 wheel arrangement as Mountain, the NYC used the name Mohawk after the Mohawk River, which ran alongside the railroad's famed Water Level Route. By the late 1930s, these early Mohawks were limited to 60 mph (97 km/h) due to their instability at higher speeds. By this point, the NYC still needed heavier, faster steam power to move both freight and passenger trains, so they opted to pursue development of a dual-service steam locomotive. New York Central chief mechanical engineer Paul W. Kiefer had rebuilt two L2s Nos. 2995 and 2998 during 1939 with lightweight side rods, cast engine beds, and improved counterbalancing to run smoothly at 80 mph (129 km/h). This inspired Keifer to design the L-3 Mohawks in the early 1940s.

The first of 25 L-3s, Nos. 3000–3024, were built by American Locomotive Company (ALCO) in Schenectady, New York, between October and December 1940. These locomotives were equipped with a cast-steel pilot, two air pump shields, and a vertically retractable coupler, giving them a close resemblance from the front to the NYC J-3a class 4-6-4 Hudsons. They were also equipped with roller bearings on all wheels, including their 69 in (1,753 mm) driving wheels in order to run smoothly at 80 mph (129 km/h) for use on express passenger trains. This batch of locomotives was designated as L-3a. The L-3as were superior to the Hudsons particularly in rated horsepower up to 50 mph (80 km/h), making them preferable for handling heavier passenger trains. Additionally, they were NYC's first modern dual-service steam locomotives.

Five L-3b locomotives, Nos. 3025–3034, were built by ALCO between December 1940 and January 1941, while the other five L-3bs, Nos. 3035–3049, were built by Lima Locomotive Works (LLW) in Lima, Ohio, between November 1940 and January 1941. These locomotives were equipped with a front footboard-style pilot and were designed to pull fast freight trains. In March and April 1942, NYC ordered 15 more L-3s, Nos. 3050–3064, from ALCO. These locomotives were quite similar to the previous L-3bs but with increased weight on the drivers, which classified them as L-3c. The ALCO L-3 locomotives were equipped with a Worthington 5-1/2 SA feedwater heater mounted ahead of the smokestack, while the LLW L-3bs had a drum style Elesco K50L type mounted on top of the front smokebox.

All of the L-3 classes were designed for an operating boiler pressure of 250 psi (1.72 MPa). After being delivered to NYC, in 1940 No. 3000 was upgraded with 72 in (1,829 mm) driving wheels, 36 in (914 mm) trailing wheels and an operating boiler pressure of 260 psi (1.79 MPa). (Note: This successful experiment would pave the way of the L-4 class.) Some L-3s were also equipped with a larger tender, which could hold 43 t (95,000 lb) of coal and 15,500 US gal (59,000 L) of water along with a water scoop to pick up water from the track pan. After World War II ended, all of the L-3s were fitted with smoke deflectors.

=== Revenue service ===
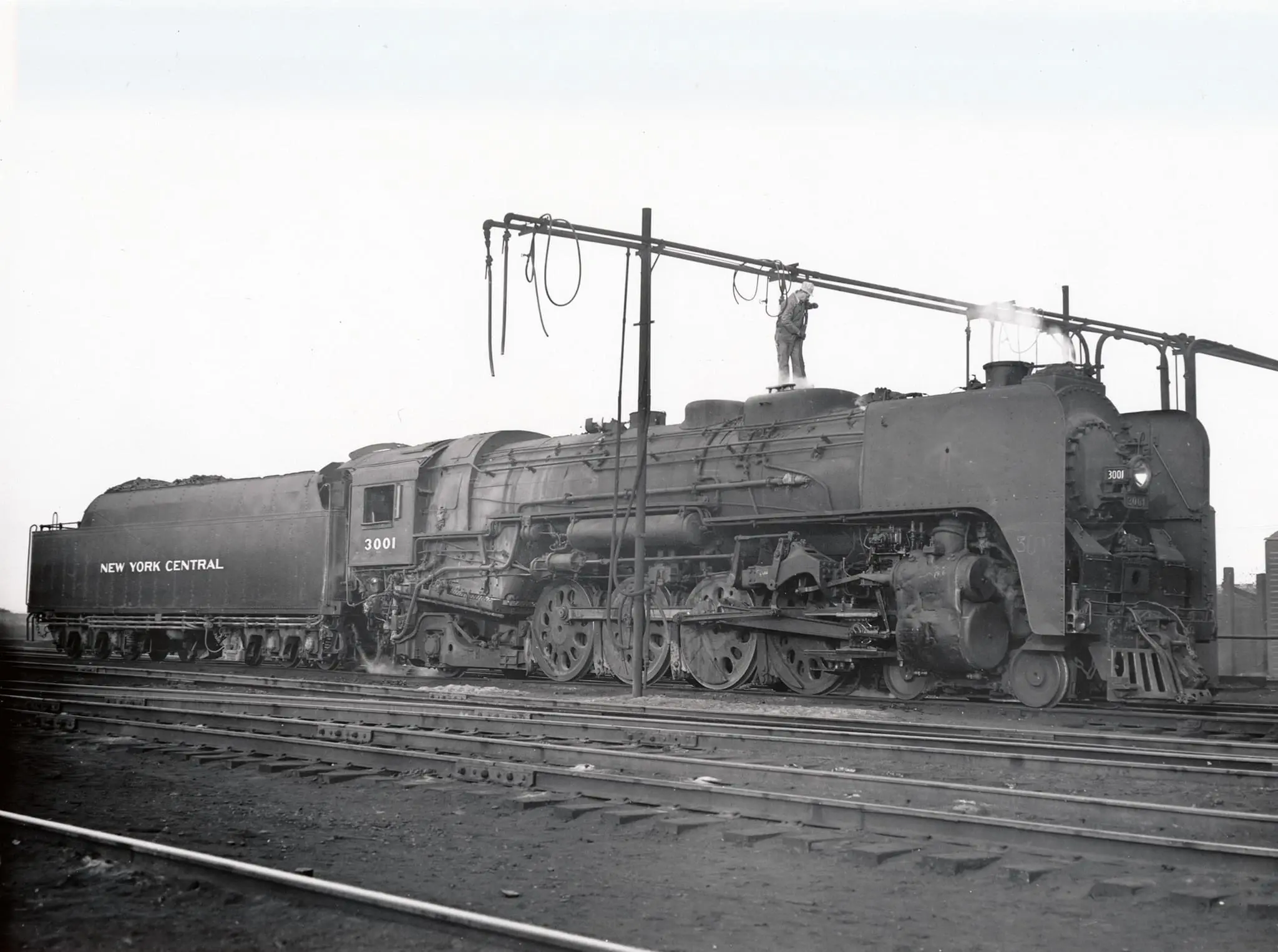
No. 3001 at the sanding tower in Bellefontaine, Ohio, refilling its sand dome in 1952.

No. 3001 is the second member of the L-3a class, built in October 1940. It was first stationed at the Elkhart, Indiana roundhouse. It was initially assigned to pull heavy freight trains and troop trains during World War II. After the war ended, No. 3001 and the other L-3s ran on the mountainous Boston & Albany (B&A) subsidiary, replacing the B&A J-2 Hudsons on the Boston-Albany sections of the Lake Shore Limited and Wolverine, as well as the New England States and New England Wolverine. Several were also assigned to the NYC's famed Pacemaker, Empire State Express and 20th Century Limited passenger trains between Croton–Harmon and Buffalo, New York. (Note: At Croton–Harmon, steam locomotives were swapped out for electric locomotives to haul the southbound passenger trains down to the Grand Central Terminal in New York City on the Hudson Line. In the northbound direction, the electric locomotives would pull the trains up to Harmon for the steam locomotives to pull. Since 1908, steam locomotives were banned within the New York City areas south of the Harlem River due to a series of longer tunnel accidents involving the smoke and steam from the steam locomotives.)

After the B&A and Harmon-Buffalo lines were completely dieselized in the early 1950s, (Note: Sister locomotive No. 3004 pulled the final steam-powered revenue B&A passenger train from Boston to Chicago on April 16, 1951.) No. 3001 and the L-3s were reassigned to the Big Four to haul both passenger and freight trains between Chicago, Illinois; Bellefontaine, Columbus, Cincinnati and Cleveland, Ohio; Indianapolis, Indiana; and St. Louis, Missouri. (Note: In September 1956, sister locomotive No. 3005 was featured in Trains Magazine writer David P. Morgan's The Mohawk that refused to abdicate article, recounting its adventure at Shelby, Ohio in September 1955.) On January 2, 1957, No. 3001 received fresh bearing components, before finally being retired from NYC's operating locomotive roster in February 1957, just three months before the end of steam on the New York Central System.

=== Retirement and attempted restoration ===
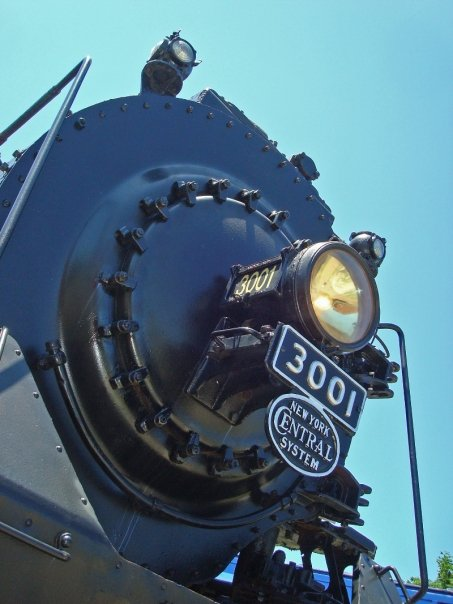
A close-up of No. 3001's headlight and number plate.

In March 1957, the NYC sold No. 3001 to the Texas and Pacific Railway (T&P), to replace the heavily vandalized and subsequently scrapped T&P 2-10-4 "Texas"-type No. 638, which had been on display at the Texas State Fairgrounds there from 1949 to 1955. The T&P then donated No. 3001, masquerading as T&P No. 909, to the city of Dallas, Texas. The city later donated No. 3001, still masquerading as T&P No. 909, to the local Southwest Historical Society, who put it on display at their Age of Steam Railroad Museum.

Sometime during its display period in Dallas, the locomotive was borrowed by a power plant for use as a stationary steam generator. In 1976, Robert G. Spaugh, founding member of the Lakeshore Railroad Historical Foundation, discovered the disposition of No. 3001 and sought to bring it back to its original home base territory. Alongside his plans to bring No. 3001 back to Elkhart, Spaugh also dreamed of restoring No. 3001 to operating condition and operating excursions over former NYC trackage. In 1981 or 1982, Spaugh cosmetically restored No. 3001 to its original as-built NYC appearance, but the locomotive remained in Texas. In April 1984, the Southwest Historical Society reached an agreement with the Lakeshore Railroad Historical Foundation to trade No. 3001 in exchange for Pennsylvania Railroad GG1 No. 4903, and the L-3a was subsequently towed north to the foundation's location in Elkhart, Indiana. In 1986 or 1987, No. 3001 was leased to the city of Elkhart for a term of 100 years.

The No. 3001 locomotive was left on display at the National New York Central Railroad Museum (NNYX), but it was considered as an operational restoration candidate for years. At some point, No. 3001 was coupled to sister L-3b No. 3042's tender, which had been used as an auxiliary water carrier on the American Freedom Train and Chessie Steam Special in the 1970s. The Lakeshore Railroad Historical Foundation had considered restoring No. 3001 to operating condition, but did not go through with the proposed plan. In the 1980s, Conrail wanted to restore No. 3001 to operating condition for their proposed steam program. However, Conrail's then-CEO Richard Sanborn (who spearheaded the proposed program) died in 1989 and the plans did not proceed.

In the late 1980s, following the lease of No. 3001 to the City of Elkhart, then-mayor James Perron envisioned No. 3001 being restored to operating condition and using it to promote Elkhart economic development. However, this did not pan out. In the early to mid 1990s, the No. 3001 locomotive was proposed to be restored to operating condition for the 21st Century Limited, a cross country exhibit train to highlight the achievements and discoveries of the 20th century, spearheaded by Ross Rowland. (Note: During this time, some restoration work was performed on the locomotive. The tubes and flues were removed and drilling and test fitting for the staybolts was underway. However, this work would never be completed.) However, the 21st Century Limited project was never realized. In 2010, another effort to restore No. 3001 to operating condition arose at a cost of $1 million. However, nothing ever came of this attempt. In 2017, the Lakeshore Railroad Historical Foundation was administratively dissolved by the Indiana Secretary of State, leaving No. 3001 without a clear caretaker or future.

=== Acquisition and funding ===
During late August 2023, the Fort Wayne Railroad Historical Society (FWRHS) secretly entered negotiations with the City of Elkhart government to potentially purchase No. 3001 and restore it to operating condition. (Note: The society had considered restoring Wabash 0-6-0 No. 534 and Nickel Plate Road 2-8-2 No. 624 to operating condition, but decided to not pursue either restoration project.) In early September of that same year, the City of Elkhart government agreed to the sale. On October 9, 2024, the FWRHS announced their acquisition of No. 3001 and their plans to operationally restore the locomotive for eventual use in their Indiana Rail Experience excursions on the Indiana Northeastern Railroad, alongside Nickel Plate Road No. 765. FMW Solutions was tasked to inspect the locomotive for restoration eligibility with financial support from former Norfolk Southern (NS) CEO Wick Moorman. It was estimated that the restoration cost of No. 3001 would be $4.3 million to complete. The FWRHS issued a $100,000 challenge grant with the goal of raising more than $500,000 by the end of May 2025 to re-locate No. 3001 to the FWRHS's facility in New Haven, Indiana.

In February 2025, one of No. 3001's cross compound air compressors was discovered to have sustained freeze damage, and had to be swapped out with a replacement from former Florida East Coast Railway (FEC) 0-8-0 switcher No. 253, which was undergoing cosmetic restoration for static display in Abbeville, Alabama. By March 2025, the FWRHS had raised more than $284,643 with a $20,000 donor match announced for all donors made between March 18 and April 30. On May 31, 2025, the cost of relocating the locomotive was fully funded. In early November, work on preparing to move No. 3001 began. On November 24, the FWRHS announced a $10,000 donor match for all donors to support the locomotive's restoration between November 24 and December 31. During Spring of 2026, the FWRHS rebuilt the trackage in the NNYX's yard in order to get No. 3001 out of the yard and onto NS rails. Additionally, the FWRHS upgraded the locomotive's air brake system to modern 26L standards, making it safe to be towed on the mainline. On July 18, 2026, FWRHS re-organized the NNYX yard and assembled the outbound move consist for the locomotive. During the re-arrangement process, No. 3001 was moved outside the fence of the NNYX for the first time in years. The FWRHS, in collaboration with NNYX, hosted a public send-off celebration on September 4 and 5, 2026, prior to the Mohawk's departure.

On September 15, 2026, No. 3001 left the NNYX and was transported to the FWRHS shop by an SD70ACe diesel No. 1066, Norfolk Southern's NYC heritage unit. On September 26, FWRHS hosted a special open house at their shop in New Haven, to officially welcome the No. 3001 locomotive. The locomotive is currently undergoing its restoration at the FWRHS's New Haven Shop.

== See also ==
- Canadian National 6060
- Chesapeake and Ohio 2716
- Pennsylvania Railroad 6755
- Texas and Pacific 610

== Bibliography ==
- Drury, George H. (2015). Guide to North American Steam Locomotives (2nd ed.). Kalmbach Media. ISBN 978-1-62700-259-2.
- Gerbracht, Thomas R. (2000). "The Late Mohawks" (PDF). Central Headlight. Vol. 30, no. 4. New York Central System Historical Society. pp. 11–32. Archived from the original (PDF) on June 16, 2024.
- Jones, Robert W. (1997). Boston and Albany: The New York Central in New England Volume 1 (1st ed.). Pine Tree Press. ISBN 0-9640356-1-8.
- Klein, Aaron E. (1985). The History of the New York Central System (1st ed.). Bonanza Books. ISBN 0-517-46085-8.
- May, Edward L.; Stoving, Richard L. (2005). New York Central Power Along the Hudson: Volume 1 - Harmon (1st ed.). The Railroad Press. ISBN 1-931477-16-7.
- Solomon, Brian; Schafer, Mike (1999). New York Central Railroad. Railroad Color History (1st ed.). MBI Publishing Company. ISBN 0-7603-0613-3.
- Staufer, Alvin F. (1961). Steam Power of the New York Central System Volume 1: Modern Power - 1915-1955 (1st ed.). Standard Print & Publishing.
- Staufer, Alvin F.; May, Edward L. (1974). Thoroughbreds: New York Central's 4-6-4 Hudson, the most Famous Class of Steam Locomotive in the World. Medina, Ohio: A. F. Staufer. ISBN 978-0944513033.
- Ziel, Ron (1990). Mainline Steam Revival (1st ed.). Amereon House. ISBN 0-8488-0863-0.
- Zimmerman, Karl R. (2002). 20th Century Limited (1st ed.). MBI Publishing Company. ISBN 0-7603-1422-5.
