= Fort Wayne Railroad Historical Society =

Railroad museum in New Haven, Indiana

- Abbreviation: FWRX
- Founded: 1972
- Type: Non-Profit
- Purpose: To provide outstanding, hands-on, educational experiences with Nickel Plate Road steam locomotive no. 765.
- Location: New Haven, IN
- Coordinates: 41°04′44.0″N 84°56′11.2″W
- Region served: Eastern United States
- Products: Vintage Steam-Era Railroad Equipment
- Members: 400+
- Volunteers: 70
- Website: fortwaynerailroad.org

The Fort Wayne Railroad Historical Society (reporting mark FWRHS) is a non-profit group in New Haven, Indiana that is dedicated to the restoration and operation of the ex-Nickel Plate Railroad's steam locomotive no. 765 and other vintage railroad equipment. Since restoration, the 765 was added to the National Register of Historic Places as no. 96001010 on September 12, 1996 and has operated excursion trains across the Eastern United States. In 2012, the FWRHS's steam locomotive no. 765 was added to the Norfolk Southern's 21st Century Steam program.

== History ==
The Fort Wayne Railroad Historical Society was formed in 1972 and currently has over 400 members and over 70 volunteers. The group was formed with one purpose in mind: to restore an old steam locomotive to operational use and see it running down the tracks again. The history of the group actually begins before the FWRHS was formally conceived.

The Fort Wayne Railroad Historical Society's story began with a series of events that began long before anyone had the idea to form a preservation group. In the mid-1950s, diesel locomotives began replacing steam locomotives for mainline freight and passenger service due to the cheaper operating costs of the diesels. With many of its steam locomotives retired or otherwise not in service by 1958, the New York, Chicago, & St. Louis Railroad, also known as the Nickel Plate Road, classified many of its steam locomotives in non-operating "stored-serviceable" condition. In 1958, the 765 was fired up as a stationary steam generating boiler in the Nickel Plate Road's New Haven, IN shops. Following a few short years in this role, the railroad officially retired the locomotive in 1963 and offered it to the city of Fort Wayne, IN as a static monument.

The city was eager to accept the railroad's offer, however, they wanted to receive locomotive 767 rather than the 765. They wanted the alternative locomotive because in October 1955 the city, in conjunction with the railroad, built an elevated railroad line through the city to eliminate railroad grade crossings that tied up traffic between the North and South ends of town, and the 767 was used to pull the ceremonial train across the newly constructed bridge. Due to a grade crossing accident and being stored outdoors afterwards, the 767 was much more deteriorated than the 765, which had been stored indoors. The city accepted the 765 and had its numbers repainted to 767. The steam engine was then pushed into Fort Wayne's Lawton Park, where it remained as a monument and a reminder of steam for the next 12 years.

In September 1971, at a convention for the Nickel Plate Railroad Historical & Technical Society, a group of individuals decided they wanted to discuss the possibility of restoring the 765, the 767, and a Wabash Railroad locomotive (no.534) cosmetically. By November of the next year, four individuals, Wayne York, Glenn Brendel, Walter Sassmannshausen, and John Eichman drafted incorporation paperwork with Allen County and the Fort Wayne Railroad Historical Society, INC. was born.

In 1973, the new group worked out a deal with the city of Fort Wayne to acquire the locomotive in Lawton Park under a 25-year lease. They then began looking at the locomotive on a more in-depth level and decided that the necessary repairs could not be done at the Lawton Park site. On September 6, 1974, the FWRHS built temporary tracks. through the city to connect to the existing railroad tracks and they pulled the 765 from the park to the FWRHS property in New Haven. From 1975 to 1979, a group of unpaid volunteers completely rebuilt the 765 and in September 1979, the NKP 765 was fired and ran under its own steam for the first time for testing since 1963. Along with operating NKP 765, from 1994 to 2001, the facilities also housed another Berkshire locomotive, the Chesapeake and Ohio 2716 and operated it in 1996 on short excursions.

== About the 765 ==
Railroads commonly relied on drag freights with engines that could pull heavy tonnage, but at low speeds. Following experiments with existing designs, Lima Locomotive Works developed a new wheel arrangement, the 2-8-4, to accommodate an increase in the size of the locomotive's firebox. An increase in the firebox size allowed more coal combustion and subsequent heat output, improving the amount of steam developed and increasing horsepower. These and other modifications created the concept of "horsepower at speed."

The NKP 765 is a steam locomotive built for the Nickel Plate Road in 1944 by the Lima Locomotive Works. Classified as an "S-2" Berkshire-type steam locomotive, the locomotive is based on a 2-8-4 wheel arrangement. It operated freight and passenger trains until retirement in 1963. The Berkshire locomotives earned their name from the Berkshire Mountains in Southwest Massachusetts.

The Berkshire class of locomotives was not the heaviest, fastest, or most powerful, but was a popular all-around type intended for fast freight service. It survived in regular use until 1958, between Chicago, Fort Wayne, Cleveland, and Buffalo. The Nickel Plate was one of the last Class I railroads to regularly use steam locomotives, only the Illinois Central, Norfolk & Western, Colorado & Southern, Fort Worth & Denver, and Grand Trunk Western were to continue longer, until spring 1960.

The Nickel Plate Road had a fleet of 112 of the 2-8-4 Berkshire type steam locomotives. After retirement, most obsolete locomotives were cut up for scrap and melted down. A total of six were saved by various means. Five survivors were from the second batch of the S-2 Class, 755-769, which were built at the height of World War II in summer and fall 1944. The sixth survivor was from the S-3 Class, 770-779, built in spring 1949. The 779 was requested to be saved because it was the last steam locomotive of any type built by the Lima Locomotive Works, Lima, Ohio, the third largest commercial builder of steam locomotives in the United States.

The 765 was on display from 1963 to 1974 in Fort Wayne, Indiana's Lawton Park before being leased by the FWRHS. From 1975 to 1979, 765 was restored to operating condition at the corner of Ryan and Edgerton Roads in New Haven, IN. The restoration site lacked conventional shop facilities and protection from the elements, but on September 1, 1979, the 765 made its first move under its own power.

Later that winter it ran under its own power to Bellevue and Sandusky, Ohio for heated, indoor winter storage. In spring of 1980, 765 underwent a series of break-in runs followed by its first public excursion, making 765 the first mainline steam locomotive to be restored and operated by an all volunteer non-profit organization.

From 2001 to 2005, the 765 was completely rebuilt at a total cost of $750,000. The Society has a crew of volunteers, several of whom have been with the Society since its inception. This rebuild included adding an MU stand and in-cab signalling.

On average, the locomotive experiences 3,000 visitors a day when operating, with visitor and passenger numbers running between 40,000 and 60,000 ticket buyers in 2009 and 2011 in less than 30 days, respectively. Typical passenger trains carry anywhere from 600 to 1,000 people at a time with tickets for many trips selling out in 24 hours.

Press reports indicate the continuous presence of large crowds of "locals and out of towners" and on 765's ability to boost tourism in the towns that it travels through. In 2012, the Pittsburgh Tribune's headline photo proclaimed that the 765 was the "engine that still can" with CBS Pittsburgh describing it as "400 tons of Americana". When not operating excursions, 765 is maintained in a restoration shop in New Haven and maintained by a crew of 70-100 volunteers throughout the year. The shop is open to the public and houses a variety of other railroad equipment including vintage steam and diesel locomotives, passenger cars, cabooses, and more.

== Future plans ==
From 2012 to 2015, the FWRHS worked alongside the Norfolk Southern Railroad as a part of the 21st Century Steam Program. In this program, the 765, along with other historic steam locomotives in the Eastern United States, operated excursion trains for tourists and company employees & VIP's over the railroad's trackage. As well as being a part of the 21st Century Steam Program, the FWRHS was working with the city of Fort Wayne to develop a downtown riverfront property that would have housed the NKP 765 and the FWRHS as well as being a centerpiece for walking & biking trails and a park. The project, originally known as Headwaters Junction, was in the planning phase, but if approved could have boosted the popularity and recognition of the FWRHS by making it a prominent attraction in the city. The project did not pan out as originally intended, with a variety of factors limiting efforts to expand. A down-sized version of the concept, using elements from the Headwaters Junction project, called Pufferbelly Junction Inc. was established in downtown Fort Wayne. The Society shifted their focus to moving their original Headwaters Junction project to north east Indiana. The Headwaters Junction project was sadly never seen the light of day. Since 2022, the FWRHS has operated the Indiana Rail Experience, A multi-year partnership with the Indiana Northeastern Railroad to operate excursions, host educational programs & special events on the Indiana Northeastern Railroad. They are expanding the shop to occupy more equipment to be restored!

== Equipment ==
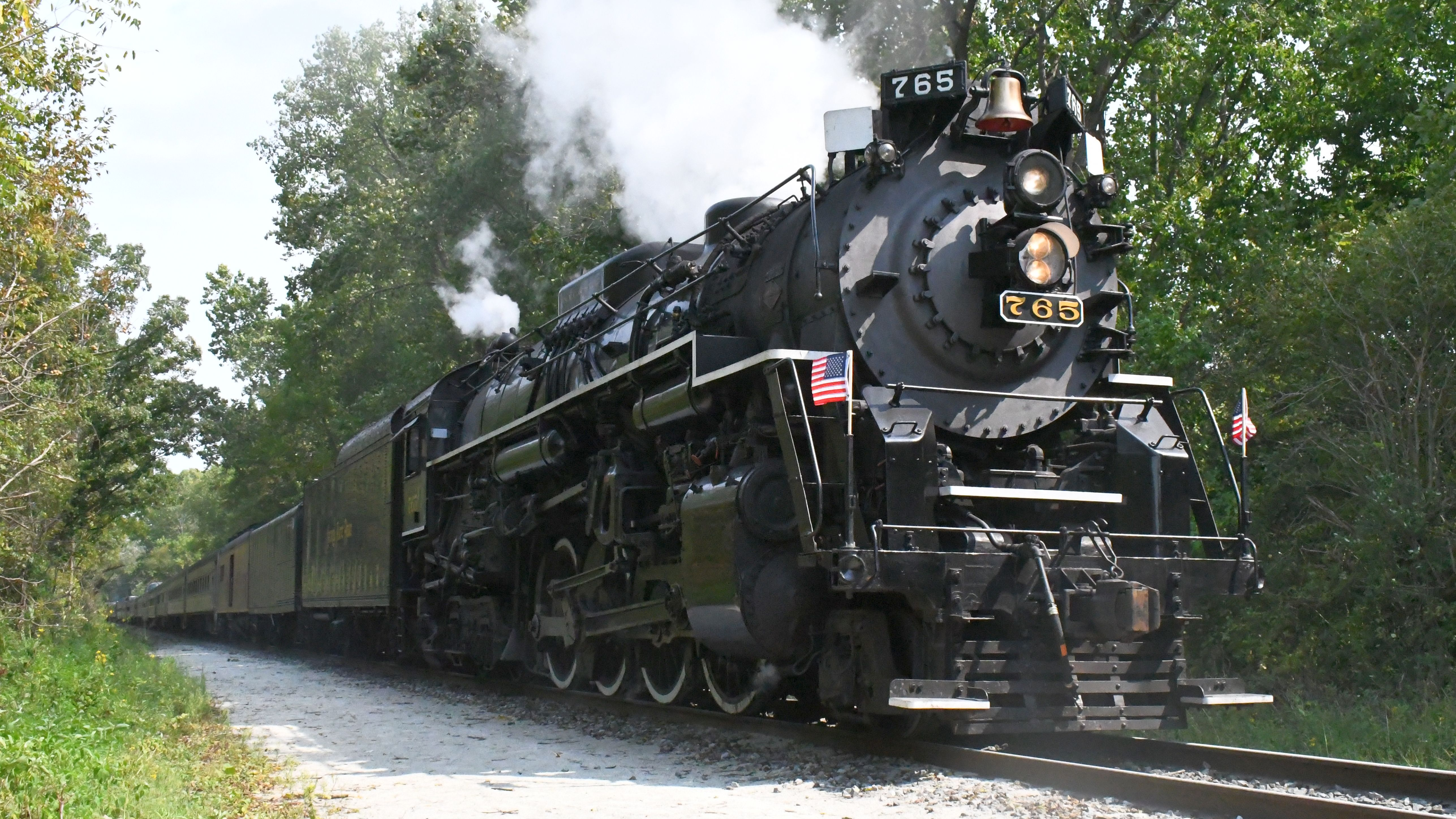

=== Locomotives ===
Locomotive details
Number	Images	Type	Model	Built	Builder	Status	Description
765		Steam	2-8-4	1944	Lima Locomotive Works	Operational	Built by the Nickel Plate Road. Donated to City of Fort Wayne in 1963, placed on static display in Lawton Park. Leased to FWRHS, moved to New Haven in 1974. Restored by FWRHS from 1975 to 1979, used on public excursions since 1980.
534		Steam	0-6-0	1906	American Locomotive Company	Stored, awaiting restoration	Built for the Wabash Railroad. Donated to City of Fort Wayne in 1957, placed on static display in Swinney Park. Donated to FWRHS in 1984, stored, awaiting restoration to operating condition.
624		Steam	2-8-2	1922	Lima Locomotive Works	Stored, awaiting cosmetic or operational restoration	Built for the Nickel Plate Road. Donated to the City of Hammond, Indiana in 1955, placed on static display in front of Hammond Civic Center. Displayed in Hammond from 1955 to 2017, Donated to FWRHS by City of Hammond in 2016. Stored in New Haven, Indiana.
3001		Steam	4-8-2	1940	American Locomotive Company	Under restoration	Built for the New York Central. Cosmetically altered to Texas and Pacific appearance and donated to the City of Dallas, Texas in 1957, subsequently donated to the Museum of the American Railroad. Traded to the Lakeshore Railroad Historical Foundation (LRHF) for PRR GG1 4903 in 1984 and moved to Elkhart, Indiana. Donated to the National New York Central Railroad Museum in 1986 or 1987 and placed on static display. Over the next 3 decades, several attempts to return the locomotive to operating condition were undertaken, but none were successful. Purchased by FWRHS from the City of Elkhart in 2023. Under restoration to operating condition in New Haven, Indiana.
358		Diesel	SD9	1957	Electro-Motive Diesel	Operational	Built for the Nickel Plate Road. Donated to FWRHS by Norfolk Southern in 2010, Restored by FWRHS from 2016 to 2024.
96C		Diesel	FP7	1951	General Motors Electro-Motive Division	Stored	Built for the Milwaukee Road. Purchased by the Indiana Transportation Museum in 1983. Operated by ITM from 1983 to 1999, Leased to the Central Railroad of Indianapolis in 1989. Sold to FWRHS in 2021, stored in Wabash, Indiana.
72C		Diesel	F7A	1949	General Motors Electro-Motive Division	Stored	Built for the Milwaukee Road and numbered 72C. Purchased by the Indiana Transportation Museum in 1983, under restoration from 2007 to 2018. Sold to FWRHS in 2021, stored in Wabash, Indiana.
68B		Diesel	F7B	1949	General Motors Electro-Motive Division	Stored	Built for the Milwaukee Road. Purchased by the Indiana Transportation Museum in 1983, Stored from 1983 to 2021. Sold to FWRHS in 2021, stored in Wabash, Indiana.
1231		Diesel	44-ton switcher	1953	GE Transportation	Operational	Built for the U.S. Army. Donated to FWRHS in 1984, used as a shop switcher at the FWRHS restoration shop in New Haven, Indiana.
65-00144		Diesel	50-ton switcher	1942	Plymouth Locomotive Works	Operational	Built for Cyclops Steel. Purchased by FWRHS in 2017, used as a shop switcher at the FWRHS shop in New Haven, Indiana.

=== Former units ===
Locomotive details
Number	Images	Type	Model	But	Builder	Status	Owner	Description
342L		Diesel	CF7	1953	Electro-Motive Diesel	Operational	Horizon Rail Leasing	Built for the Santa Fe Railway as an F7A. Rebuilt in December 1974 as a CF7 at the ATSF Cleburne Shops and renumbered 2487. Sold by the Santa Fe to the Gloster Southern Railroad in the 1980s, renumbered 1501. Sold by the Gloster Southern to the Louis Dreyfus Company in the 2000s, renumbered 2018. Sold or Leased by Louis Dreyfus to FWRHS in 2014, used behind 765 on ferry moves. Sold by FWRHS to Horizon Rail Leasing in 2015.
2700		Steam	2-8-4	1943	American Locomotive Company	Display	Dennison Railroad Depot Museum	Built for the Chesapeake and Ohio Railway. Leased to FWRHS by 2700 Restoration and Preservation Society in 1991. To be restored to operating condition by FWRHS, but plans were scrapped following ownership dispute surfacing. Used by FWRHS as a parts source for 2716 and 765 (in 1993.) Leased by FWRHS from 1991 to 2001.
2716		Steam	2-8-4	1943	American Locomotive Company	Under restoration	Kentucky Steam Heritage Corporation	Built for the Chesapeake and Ohio Railway. Leased by FWRHS from the Kentucky Railway Museum from 1994 to 2001. Restored to operating condition, and operated by FWRHS in 1996. Plans to operate 2716 in 1997 were drawn up and subsequently cancelled.

=== Rolling stock ===
==== Passenger cars ====
Passenger car details
Number	Images	Type	Built	Builder	Status	Description
1		Business car	1929	Pullman Standard	Stored, awaiting restoration	Built for the Nickel Plate Road. Sold to Norfolk and Western Railway in 1964, renumbered 103 in 1967. Sold to private owner in the 1970s; purchased by the Indiana Transportation Museum in 1999. Used by ITM from 2001 to 2015 for excursions and special events, sold to Felix Powell in 2018. Stored in Forest Park from 2000 to 2026, Sold to Fort Wayne Railroad Historical Society in 2026. Stored, awaiting restoration in New Haven, Indiana.
7		Business	1923	Pullman Standard	Operational	Named Kitchi Gammi Club. Converted into business car in 1953. To the Norfolk & Western Railway in October 1964, Renumbered 107. Pressed into wreck train service in 1967. To Norfolk Southern, following the merger with the Southern Railway in 1982. Sold by NS to Virginia Rail Investment Corp (VRIC) in 1989. Restored by VRIC from 1989 to 1994, used on Amtrak trains from 1988 to 2019. Leased by FWRHS in 2024, Sold by VRIC to FWRHS in January 2025.
194		Dining	1948	Budd Company	Operational	Named Silver Diner. Built for the Chicago, Burlington & Quincy Railroad. Sold to Amtrak in 1971, renumbered 8051. Donated to the FWRHS by Amtrak in 2019, Restored by FWRHS in 2022.
701		Tool/Crew	1953	St. Louis Car Company	Operational	Named Glenn E. Brendal. Built for the US Army as a kitchen car in 1953 & Numbered 89665. Sold to the Kentucky Railway Museum & used as a concessions car. Sold by KRM to FWRHS in 1979. Converted into tool car for NKP 765 in 1981–82. Used by NKP 765, C&O 2716 & Milwaukee Road 261.
831		RPO	1914	Standard Steel Car Company	Stored	Built for the Lake Erie and Western in 1914, numbered 31. Following LE&W merger with the NKP in 1922, LE&W 31 was renumbered to NKP 831. Donated to the FWRHS by the Norfolk and Western in 1974. Currently stored in New Haven, Indiana.
2512		Sleeper	1950	Budd Company	Stored	Named Pine King. Built for the Santa Fe Railway. Sold by Santa Fe to Amtrak in the 1970s. Purchased by FWRHS from Ozark Mountain Railcar in 2024. Currently stored in Pleasant Lake, Indiana, used as a dorm car for the FWRHS crew.
2566		Coach	1941	Budd Company	Stored, awaiting restoration	Built for the 1941 Empire State Express. Sold to the Rochester and Genesee Valley Railroad Museum in 1987. Sold by RGVRRM to FWRHS in 2023. Currently awaiting restoration to operating condition in New Haven, Indiana.
2567		Coach	1941	Budd Company	Stored, awaiting restoration	Built for the 1941 Empire State Express. Sold to the Rochester and Genesee Valley Railroad Museum in 1987. Sold by RGVRRM to FWRHS in 2023. Currently awaiting restoration to operating condition in New Haven, Indiana.
2568		Coach	1941	Budd Company	Operational	Built in 1942 for the Empire State Express. Sold to the Rochester and Genesee Valley Railroad Museum in 1987. Sold by RGVRRM to FWRHS in 2023. Restored by FWRHS in 2024.
2571		Coach	1941	Budd Company	Stored, awaiting restoration	Named Hamilton Fish. Built for the 1941 Empire State Express. Sold to the Rochester and Genesee Valley Railroad Museum in 1987. Sold by RGVRRM to FWRHS in 2023. Currently awaiting restoration to operating condition in New Haven, Indiana.
2572		Dining	1941	Budd Company	Stored, awaiting restoration	Named David B. Hill. Built for the 1941 Empire State Express. Sold to the Rochester and Genesee Valley Railroad Museum in 1987. Sold by RGVRRM to FWRHS in 2023. Currently awaiting restoration to operating condition in New Haven, Indiana.
2578		Dining	1941	Budd Company	Stored, awaiting restoration	Named Charles Whitman. Built for the 1941 Empire State Express. Sold to the Rochester and Genesee Valley Railroad Museum in 1987. Sold by RGVRRM to FWRHS in 2023. Currently awaiting restoration to operating condition in New Haven, Indiana.
3669		Baggage	1955	American Car and Foundry	Stored	Built for the Atchison, Topeka & Santa Fe Railway. Donated to FWRHS by Amtrak in 2019, Stored in New Haven, Indiana.
3671		Open air	1955	American Car and Foundry	Operational	Named John H. Emery. Originally built for the Atchison, Topeka & Santa Fe Railway as a baggage car. Donated to FWRHS by Amtrak in 2019. Converted by FWRHS into open air car in 2022.
3679		HEP	1955	American Car and Foundry	Operational	Named David A. Donoho. Originally built for the Atchison, Topeka & Santa Fe Railway as a baggage car. Donated to FWRHS by Amtrak in 2019. Converted by FWRHS into HEP car in 2023.
5021		RPO	1941	Budd Company	Stored, awaiting restoration	Named Alonzo B. Cornell. Built for the 1941 Empire State Express. Sold to the Rochester and Genesee Valley Railroad Museum in 1987. Sold by RGVRRM to FWRHS in 2023. Currently awaiting restoration to operating condition in New Haven, Indiana.
5375		First Class Lounge	1957	American Car and Foundry	Operational	Named Lawton Park. Originally built for the Union Pacific Railroad as a baggage car. Sold to Ringling Bros. and Barnum & Bailey in 1998, used on Ringling Bros. and Barnum & Bailey Circus train. Sold to Norfolk Southern in 2017, sold by NS to Everett Railroad in 2023. Sold by Everett Railroad to FWRHS in late 2023. Converted by FWRHS into first class car in 2024.
5764		First Class Lounge	1962	St. Louis Car Company	Operational	Named Centlivre Park. Originally built for the Union Pacific Railroad as a baggage car. Sold to Ringling Bros. and Barnum & Bailey in 1997, used on Ringling Bros. and Barnum & Bailey Circus train. Sold to Norfolk Southern in 2017, sold by NS to Everett Railroad in 2023. Sold by Everett Railroad to FWRHS in late 2023. Converted by FWRHS into first class car in 2024.
6523		RPO	1911	PRR Altoona Works	Stored	Built for the Pennsylvania Railroad. Displayed by Indiana Transportation Museum from 1992 to 2018. Sold to Fort Wayne Railroad Historical Society in 2018 via Ozark Mountain Railcar, Stored in Wabash, Indiana.
8254		Coach	1949	Budd Company	Operational	Named Collinsville Inn. Originally built for the Pennsylvania Railroad as a Sleeper. Converted into coach in 1963 by Budd for the 1964 New York World's Fair, renumbered 1508. Sold by Penn Central in 1976 to the Southeast Michigan Transportation Authority (SEMTA), renumbered 108 and renamed Pleasant Ridge. Leased to Metro-North Railroad in 1984. Sold to Maryland Area Rail Commuter (MARC), renumbered to 148. Sold by MARC to Washington DC NRHS Chapter in 2008. Sold by Washington DC NRHS to FWRHS in 2022.
8258		Coach	1949	Budd Company	Operational	Named Franklin Inn. Originally built for the Pennsylvania Railroad as a Sleeper. Converted into coach in 1963 by Budd for the 1964 New York World's Fair, renumbered 1537. Sold by Penn Central in 1976 to the Southeast Michigan Transportation Authority (SEMTA), renumbered 108 and renamed Hazel Ridge. Leased to Metro-North Railroad in 1984. Sold to Maryland Area Rail Commuter (MARC), renumbered to 148. Sold by MARC to Washington DC NRHS Chapter in 2008. Sold by Washington DC NRHS to FWRHS in 2022.
15412		Observation	1954	Budd Company	Stored, awaiting restoration	Named Riding Mountain Park. Built for the Canadian Pacific Railway. Sold by VIA Rail to private owner in 2005. Sold to FWRHS in 2022. Currently awaiting restoration to operating condition in New Haven, Indiana.
89516		Hospital	1953	St. Louis Car Company	Stored	Built for the US Army as #89516, Sold to Amtrak in the 1970s and renumbered 1610. Sold to Steam Railroading Institute. Sold by Steam Railroading Institute to FWRHS in 2011. Currently stored in New Haven, Indiana.
89552		Hospital	1952	St. Louis Car Company	Display	Built for the US Army. Sold to Amtrak in the 1970s and renumbered 1614. Sold to Steam Railroading Institute. Sold by Steam Railroading Institute to FWRHS in 2011. On static display at Pufferbelly Junction in downtown Fort Wayne, Indiana from 2022 - 2026. Moved by FWRHS to Indiana Rail Experience railyard in July 2026, on static display in Pleasant Lake, Indiana.

=== Former passenger cars ===
Passenger car details
Number	Images	Type	Builder	Built	Status	Description
702		Combine	1941	Pullman Standard	Scrapped	Named Delaware. Built for the Southern Railway. Donated to FWRHS by Stanley G. Nylen in 1978, converted into tool car for NKP 765. Used as 765's original tool car from 1979 to 1980. Stored by FWRHS from 1981 until 2008. Burned by vandals in 2008 & scrapped on site.
716		Coach	1949	Pullman Standard	Austin Steam Train Association, Cedar Park, TX	Named Buckeye Lake. Built for the Delaware, Lackawanna & Western Railroad. Purchased by FWRHS member Tom Stephens in the 1980s, Used for excursions behind 765 from the 1980s until 1993. Sold by Tom Stephens to the Friends of 261 in the 1990s, used on 261 excursions from the 1990s to the 2000s/2010s. Sold by Friends of 261 to Austin Steam Train Association in the 2010s.
1678		P70 Coach	1928	Standard Steel Car Company	Cape May Seashore Lines, Tuckahoe, NJ	Built for the Pennsylvania Railroad and originally numbered 3461. Rebuilt in 1950 and renumbered 1678. To Penn Central in the 1960s and later to Conrail in the 1970s. Purchased by Ross Rowland in 1980 or 81, renumbered 16 and used for the 1981 Season of the Chessie Safety Express. Purchased by FWRHS in the 1980s, renumbered 708. Used in excursion service behind NKP 765 for several years. Sold by FWRHS to the Western Maryland Scenic Railroad (WMSR) in the 1990s. Resold by WMSR to the Laurel Highlands Railroad (LH) in the mid to late 90s. Sold by LH to the Westmoreland Scenic Railroad in 2001, Sold by Westmoreland Scenic to Cape May Seashore Lines in 2006.
1704		P70 Coach	1928	Standard Steel Car Company	Cape May Seashore Lines, Tuckahoe, NJ	Built for the Pennsylvania Railroad and originally numbered 3309. Rebuilt in 1950 and renumbered 1704. To Penn Central in the 1960s and later to Conrail in the 1970s. Purchased by Ross Rowland in 1980 or 81, renumbered 14 and used for the 1981 Season of the Chessie Safety Express. Purchased by FWRHS in the 1980s, renumbered 707. Used in excursion service behind NKP 765 for several years. Sold by FWRHS to the Western Maryland Scenic Railroad (WMSR) in the 1990s. Resold by WMSR to the Laurel Highlands Railroad (LH) in the mid to late 90s. Sold by LH to the Westmoreland Scenic Railroad in 2001 and renumbered 1704, Sold by Westmoreland Scenic to Cape May Seashore Lines in 2006.
2302		Combine	1910	Pullman Standard	Destroyed by Fire	Built for the Atchison, Topeka & Santa Fe Railway. Donated to the Illinois Railway Museum. Traded to FWRHS in 1975 for a keg of spikes, burned by vandals in 1978.
3662		Baggage	1955	American Car and Foundry	Unknown	Built for the Atchison, Topeka & Santa Fe Railway. Donated to FWRHS by Amtrak in 2019, moved to Wabash, Indiana. Stored in Wabash from 2019 until 2023, sold to unknown owner in 2023. Disposition unknown.
3664		Baggage	1955	American Car and Foundry	Unknown	Built for the Atchison, Topeka & Santa Fe Railway. Donated to FWRHS by Amtrak in 2019, moved to Wabash, Indiana. Stored in Wabash from 2019 until 2023, sold to unknown owner in 2023. Disposition unknown.
7114		Coach	1920s	American Car and Foundry	Age of Steam Roundhouse Museum, Sugarcreek, OH	Built for the Chicago, Burlington & Quincy Railroad. Donated to the Kentucky Railway Museum (KRM) in the 1970s or 1980s. Purchased by FWRHS member Dan Lynch from KRM in the 1980s and renumbered 714. Used in excursion service behind 765 from the 1980s until 1991. Sold by Dan Lynch to the Ohio Central Railroad System (OHCR), renumbered 704. Used for OHCR excursions from the 1990s until 2008, moved to the Age of Steam Roundhouse Museum in the 2010s.
7158		Coach	1920s	American Car and Foundry	Age of Steam Roundhouse Museum, Sugarcreek, OH	Named Buckeye Lady. Built for the Chicago, Burlington & Quincy Railroad. Donated to the Kentucky Railway Museum (KRM) in the 1970s or 1980s. Purchased by FWRHS member Liz Stephens from KRM in the 1980s and renumbered 715. Used in excursion service behind 765 from the 1980s until 1991. Sold by Liz Stephens to the Ohio Central Railroad System (OHCR), renumbered 704. Used for OHCR excursions from the 1990s until 2008, moved to the Age of Steam Roundhouse Museum in the 2010s.
89554		Hospital	1953	St. Louis Car Company	Steam Railroading Institute, Owosso, Michigan	Built for the US Army. Sold to Amtrak in the 1970s. Converted into baggage-dorm car by Amtrak in 1973. Purchased by Bob McCowan and donated to FWRHS. Traded to Steam Railroading Institute in 2023.

==== Freight cars ====
Freight car details
Number	Images	Type	Builder	Built	Status	Description
127		Flatcar	1945	Unknown	Stored	Originally built for the Illinois Terminal Railroad. Restored by FWRHS in 2020, lettered for the Wabash Railroad.
902		Covered Hopper car	1957	Unknown	Stored, awaiting restoration	Previously owned by Lonestar Cement. Donated to National New York Central Railroad Museum by Lonestar Cement in the 1990s or early 2000s. Donated to FWRHS by City of Elkhart in 2026. Currently stored in New Haven, Indiana.
12177		Boxcar	1967	Pullman Standard	Stored	Built for the Louisville & Nashville Railway. Stored by the Indiana Transportation Museum from the early 1980s to 2021. Sold to FWRHS in 2021. Currently stored in Wabash, Indiana.
18013		Boxcar	1917	Haskel & Barker	Stored	Built for the Lake Erie & Western in 1917. Displayed by the Indiana Transportation Museum from the 1970s to 2018. Sold to FWRHS in 2021. Stored in Wabash, Indiana from 2021 to 2026, moved to New Haven, Indiana in October 2026. Currently stored in New Haven, Indiana.
20767		Boxcar	1941	American Car and Foundry	Stored, awaiting cosmetic restoration	Built for the Atlantic Coast Line. Donated to FWRHS by CSX in 2024, currently stored awaiting cosmetic restoration in New Haven, Indiana.
257784		H34C Covered Hopper	1957	PRR Altoona Works	Stored	Built for the Pennsylvania Railroad. Displayed by the Indiana Transportation Museum from 1987 to 2018. Sold to FWRHS in 2021. Stored in Wabash, Indiana from 2021 to 2026, moved to New Haven, Indiana in October 2026. Currently stored in New Haven, Indiana.
37076		Reefer	1940s	Unknown	Stored	Built for the Milwaukee Road. Donated to FWRHS by the City of Hammond in 2017, currently stored in Wabash, Indiana.
37314		Reefer	1948	Unknown	Stored, awaiting cosmetic restoration	Built for the Milwaukee Road. Donated to FWRHS in the 1970s, currently awaiting cosmetic restoration in New Haven, Indiana.
49762		Boxcar	1929	American Car and Foundry	Stored	Built for the Wabash Railroad. Donated to the Indiana Transportation Museum by Alcoa Aluminum Co. of West Lafayette, Indiana, in December 1986. Stored by ITM from 1986 to 2021. Sold to FWRHS in 2021. Stored in Wabash, Indiana from 2021 to 2026, moved to New Haven, Indiana in October 2026. Currently stored in New Haven, Indiana.
63605		Reefer	1954	Unknown	Stored, awaiting cosmetic restoration	Built for Dubuque Meats. Donated to FWRHS in the 1970s, currently awaiting cosmetic restoration in New Haven, Indiana.
63610		Reefer	1954	Unknown	Stored, awaiting cosmetic restoration	Built for Dubuque Meats. Donated to FWRHS in the 1970s, currently awaiting cosmetic restoration in New Haven, Indiana.
83074		Boxcar	1902	Haskel & Barker	Stored	Built for the Lake Erie & Western & numbered 83074. Following LE&W & NKP merger in 1922, LE&W boxcar 43074 was renumbered NKP 83074. Donated to FWRHS in the 1970s, currently stored in New Haven, Indiana.
485797		Gondola	1960s	Unknown	Operational	Built for the Baltimore & Ohio Railroad. Donated to FWRHS by CSX in 2021. Used to transport coal for NKP 765, awaiting cosmetic restoration.
141		Cupola Caboose	1901	Unknown	Operational	Built for the Lake Erie & Western as a 4-wheel bobber caboose, rebuilt by NKP into 2 truck 8 wheel caboose. Purchased by John Keller in the 1960s, donated by John Keller to FWRHS in 1975.
451		Bay Window Caboose	1962	International Car Company	Operational	Built for the Nickel Plate Road. Purchased by private owner in the 1980s, moved to FWRHS. Donated to FWRHS in 2006.
2543		Cupola Caboose	1900s	Unknown	Operational	Built for the Wabash Railroad. Retired by the Wabash in 1957, placed on static display with Wabash 0-6-0 no. 534 in Sweeney Park in downtown Fort Wayne. Donated by City of Fort Wayne to FWRHS in 1984, along with 534. Restored by FWRHS in 2021.

==== Other equipment ====
Other equipment details
Number	Images	Type	Built	Builder	Status	Description
767		Auxiliary Water Tender	1949	Lima Locomotive Works	Operational	Originally built for a Louisville and Nashville class M-1. Donated to FWRHS by Richard Sanborn of Seaboard System in 1984 and numbered 765A. Restored by FWRHS in 2017 and renumbered 767.
3042		Auxiliary Water Tender	1940	American Locomotive Company	Stored, Awaiting restoration	Originally built for NYC L-3b "Mohawk" 3042. Retired by the NYC in September 1953, locomotive scrapped in October 1953. Tender saved by NYC for non-revenue service, converted into diesel fuel tank car. Purchased by Ross Rowland for the American Freedom Train in 1975. Used as water tender for Reading 2101 for the American Freedom Train and the Chessie Steam Special from 1975 to 1979. Damaged in a Roundhouse fire in Silver Grove, Kentucky along with 2101 on March 6, 1979. Sold to Bob Spaugh in the 1980s. Donated by Spaugh to the National New York Central Railroad Museum in 1986 or 1987, Displayed behind New York Central 3001. Sold to the Fort Wayne Railroad Historical Society in September 2023, awaiting restoration to operating condition in New Haven, Indiana.
40985		Auxiliary Water Tender	1940	Lima Locomotive Works	Stored	Originally built for Louisville and Nashville class M-1 1989. Purchased by Glenn Campbell for Bessemer and Lake Erie 643. Purchased by FWRHS from Glenn Campbell in 2019, currently stored in Wabash, Indiana.
B-19		200 ton Wrecking Crane	1922	Industrial Works	Stored	Built for the Virginian Railway. Converted from steam to diesel in 1959. Currently stored in New Haven, Indiana.
1117		Speeder	19??	Unknown	Operational	Built for the Nickel Plate Road.

=== Former other equipment ===
Former Other equipment details
Number	Images	Type	Built	Builder	Status	Description
590000		Snowplow	1978	Unknown	Indiana Northeastern Railroad, Hillsdale, Michigan	Built for the Norfolk & Western. Stored by FWRHS in New Haven, Indiana from the early 2000s or 2010s until 2022. Donated by FWRHS to Indiana Northeastern Railroad in 2022.

== See also ==
- Nickel Plate Road 765
- New York Central 3001
- List of historical societies in Indiana
