= Merchants Despatch =

Rolling stock manufacturer

Merchants Despatch Transportation Company
- Founded: 1857

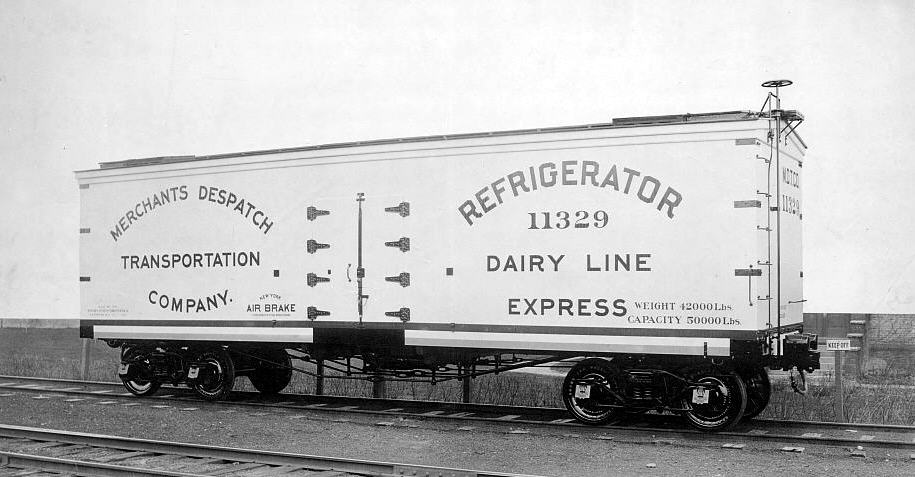
Merchants Despatch Transportation Co. refrigerator car #11329, on display at the Pan-American Exposition in 1901.

The Merchants Despatch Transportation Company (MDT, also known as the Merchants Despatch Refrigerator Line) was established in 1857 or 1858 by the American Express Company of New York (then a freight forwarding service). The entity was reformed as a joint stock trading company on June 1, 1869, with ownership divided among the Cleveland, Columbus, Cincinnati and Indianapolis Railway (CCC&I), the Lake Shore and Michigan Southern Railway, and the New York Central Railroad (NYC), all part of the Cornelius Vanderbilt rail empire.

The MDT entered the refrigerated transit business around 1880, and within five years had 1,900 reefers in service, making it one of the largest such concerns in the United States. Historian and author John H. White describes MDT as "the oldest corporate name connected with refrigerated transit to survive into modern times." The company began manufacturing cars on a small scale in 1883 and in spring of 1887 constructed a large manufacturing facility near Rochester, New York in a town they named Despatch (present-day East Rochester). MDT hired 900 workers and embarked on an aggressive car building program; by 1900 the firm owned 6,687 units, slightly more than half of which were refrigerator cars.

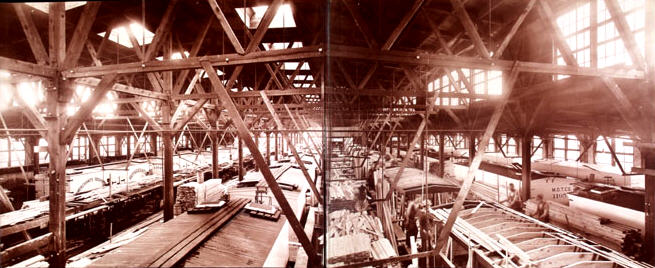
Row upon row of reefers in various stages of construction fill MDT's car shop, circa 1905.

The East Rochester plant would grow in time to encompass some 64 acres (with an adjacent rail yard of equal size), and would produce on the order of 36 cars per day. The installation became the main car plant within the New York Central system. MDT adopted the Wickes Patent into its refrigerator car design. Even with its own substantial manufacturing capacity, MDT at times purchased rolling stock from outside companies such as Pullman in order to meet the demands imposed by its rapidly expanding shipping service.

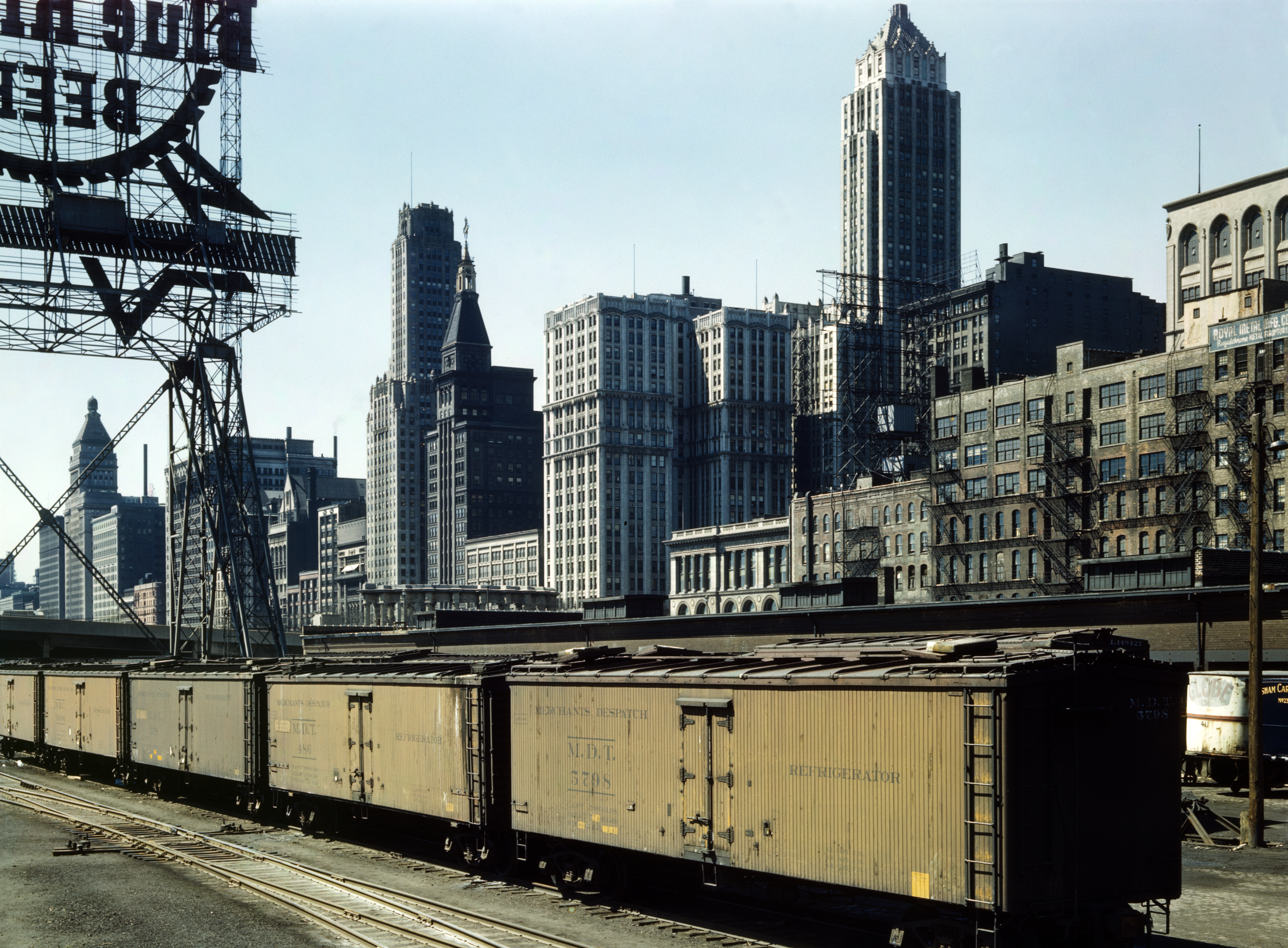
MDT cars in Chicago, 1943.

The company incorporated in the State of New York in May, 1911. 3,400 reefers were sold to the NYC in December 1912, and 2,988 to the Lake Shore line, though all of the units were in turn leased back to the MDT. The firm was reincorporated as a Delaware corporation in 1923. Circa 1925, the NYC established a new subsidiary, the Eastern Refrigerator Despatch (mirroring the expansion strategy of the rival Fruit Growers Express). Operation of the ERD, along with its 2,100 reefers, was quickly absorbed by Merchants Despatch. In November, 1928 the MDT purchased the Northern Refrigerator Car Line (founded by Milwaukee's Cudahy brothers) and its 1,800 cars.

A holding company, Merchants Despatch, Inc., merged with the MDT in 1936; the new venture was chartered in Delaware on December 18. In 1962 the NRC was combined with Merchants Despatch. At the same time, greater emphasis was placed on auto carrier business; from 1961 to 1966, the company acquired nearly 1,200 autorack cars (although the base flatcars were owned by MDT, the rack structures were owned by the New York Central). MDT also entered the Intermodal freight transport business, and purchased 572 Flexi-Van container flats (intended mainly for use in mail service on passenger trains) between 1958 and 1965.

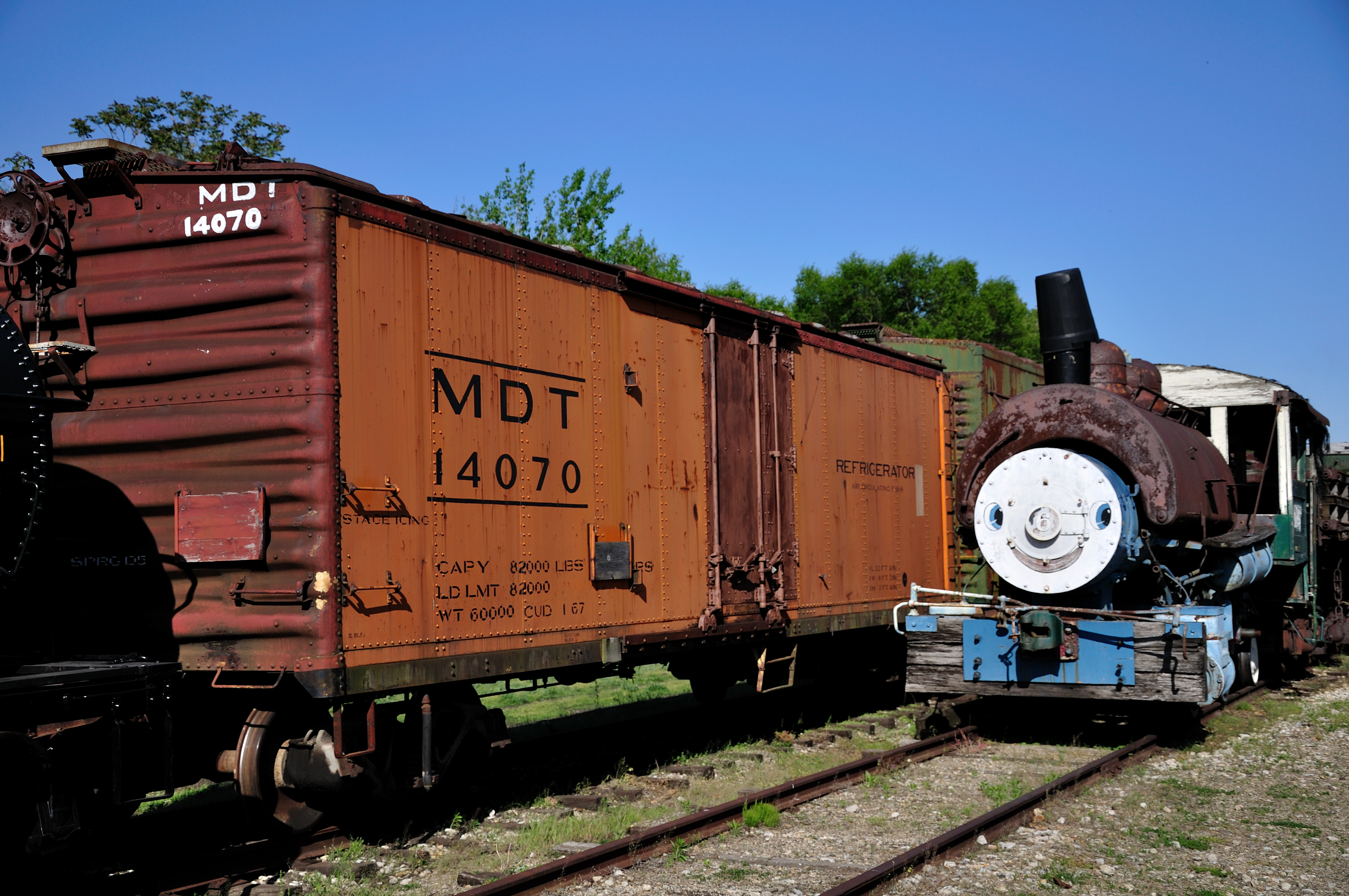
Preserved MDT car in a rail museum. Car is ca. 1958.

As part of the consolidation of facilities planned for the Penn Central merger, the car shop was closed down on April 1, 1970, and the 72-acre property was sold off. In July, 1985 the MDT assumed the responsibility for car weighing and inspection previously under the purview of the Eastern Weighing and Inspection Bureau.

After ceasing construction, MDT would continue as a repair shop, and a car lessor to both railroad and private companies. As an independent lessor, it was able to outlast NYCs merger into Penn Central, and their collapse into Conrail. However, after the 1998 purchase of Conrail, MDT's assets were merged and the company dissolved in 2000.

Merchants Despatch Transportation Company Roster, 1900–1970:

1900	1910	1920	1930	1940	1950	1960	1970
3,550	5,388	308	11,938	13,346	9,690	6,714	7,181

Northern Refrigerator Car Line Roster, 1930–1960:

1930	1940	1950	1960
3,494	4,651	4,064	3,747

Source: The Great Yellow Fleet, p. 16.
