= Louisville and Nashville class M-1 =

Class of 42 American 2-8-4 locomotives

Louisville & Nashville M-1
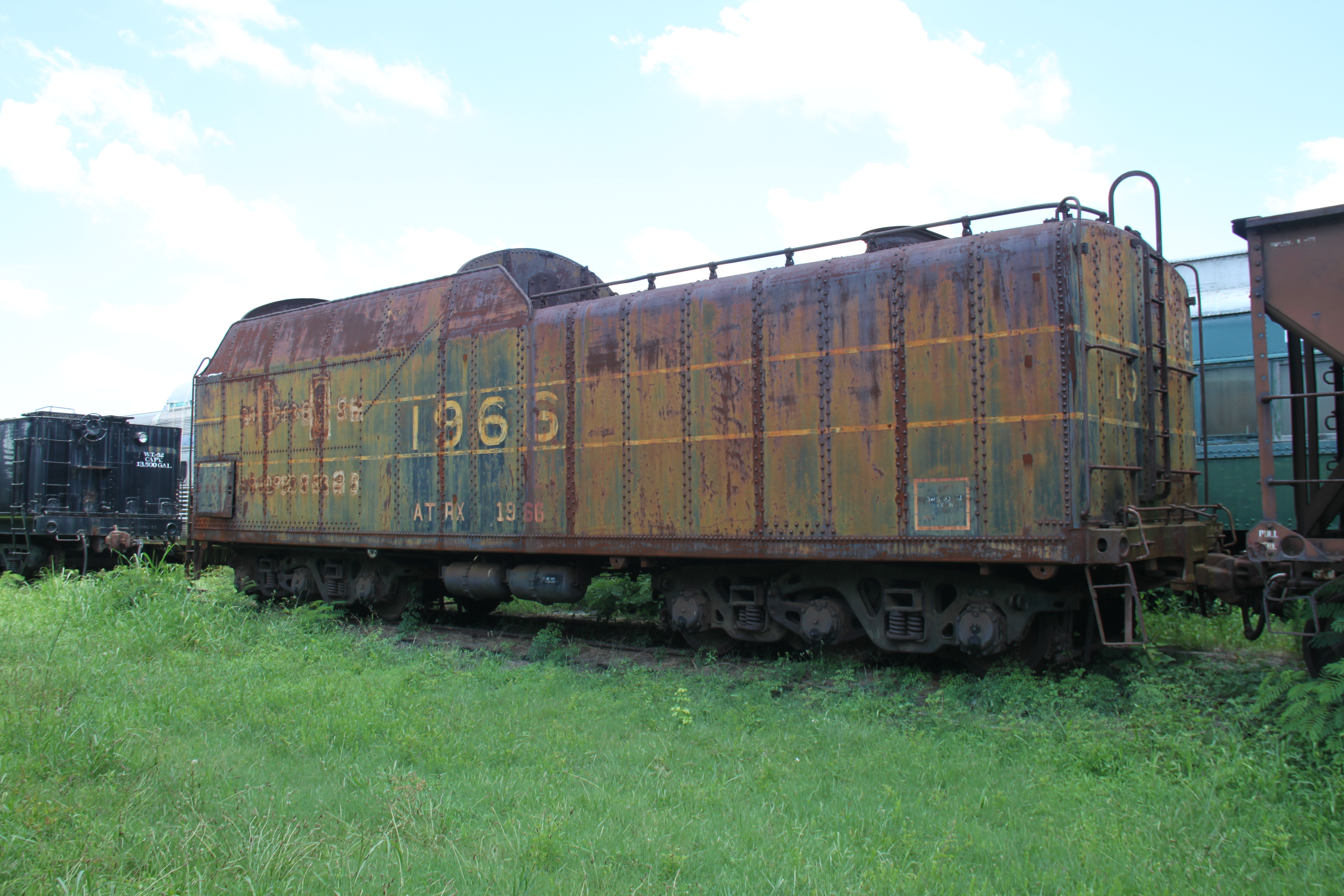
- Louisville and Nashville No. 1966's tender on display outside the Southeastern Railway Museum in Duluth, Georgia
Type and origin
- Power type: Steam
- Builder: Baldwin Locomotive Works (20); Lima Locomotive Works (22)
- Serial number: Baldwin: 64605-64618, 64723-64726, 70178-70179; Lima: 9349-9370
- Build date: 1942–1949
- Total produced: 42
Specifications
- Configuration
  - Whyte: 2-8-4
  - UIC: 1′D2 h2
- Gauge: 4 ft 8 1/2 in (1,435 mm)
- Leading dia.: 36 in (0.914 m)
- Driver dia.: 69 in (1.753 m)
- Trailing dia.: 42 in (1.067 m)
- Tender wheels: 36 in (0.914 m)
- Wheelbase: 42 ft 4 in (12.903 m)
- Length: 108 ft 2.25 in (32.98 m)
- Width: 10 ft 3 in (3.12 m)
- Height: 15 ft 10 in (4.83 m)
- Axle load: Baldwin: 68,170 lb (30.92 t; 30.43 long tons); Lima: 68,307 lb (30.984 t; 30.494 long tons)
- Adhesive weight: Baldwin: 268,200 lb (121.7 t; 119.7 long tons); Lima: 268,740 lb (121.90 t; 119.97 long tons)
- Loco weight: Baldwin: 447,200 lb (202.8 t; 199.6 long tons); Lima: 448,100 lb (203.3 t; 200.0 long tons)
- Tender weight: 384,200 lb (174.3 t; 171.5 long tons)
- Total weight: Baldwin: 831,400 lb (377.1 t; 371.2 long tons); Lima: 832,300 lb (377.5 t; 371.6 long tons)
- Fuel type: Coal
- Fuel capacity: 25 short tons (23 t)
- Water cap.: 22,000 US gal (83,000 L; 18,000 imp gal)
- Firebox
  - Grate area: 90.2 sq ft (8.38 m^{2})
- Boiler: 98 in (2,489 mm)
- Boiler pressure: 265 lbf (1.18 kN)
- Heating surface
  - Firebox: 463.3 sq ft (43.04 m^{2})
  - Total surface: 4,671 sq ft (434.0 m^{2})
- Superheater: 1,908 sq ft (177.3 m^{2})
- Cylinders: Two, outside
- Cylinder size: 25 in × 32 in (635 mm × 813 mm)
- Valve gear: Walschaerts
Performance figures
- Power output: 4,503 hp (3,358 kW) at 42 mph
- Tractive effort: 65,290 lbf (290.42 kN), 79,390 lbf (353.14 kN) with booster
- Factor of adh.: 4.11
Career
- Operators: Louisville and Nashville Railroad
- Numbers: 1950–1991
- Nicknames: Big Emmas
- Retired: 1950–1956
- Scrapped: 1956-1957
- Disposition: All scrapped, except for seven tenders; five converted to canteens

The Louisville and Nashville M-1 was a class of forty-two 2-8-4 steam locomotives built during and after World War II as dual-service locomotives. They were nicknamed "Big Emmas" by crews and were built in three batches between 1942 and 1949.

== History ==
=== Construction ===
The first two batches were built by Baldwin Locomotive Works during World War II. The first batch of ten (Nos. 1950–1959) was constructed in 1942. Upon arrival to the L&N, these were initially employed on high-speed freight service. The second batch also consisted of ten members (Nos. 1960–1969). These were built in 1944 and were pressed into passenger service. The third batch consisted of twenty-two locomotives built by Lima in 1949 (Nos. 1970–1991). These were the second to last class of Berkshires to be built and ordered by Lima, the last being the New York, Chicago and St. Louis Railroad S-3 Class. The Big Emmas proved to be the most expensive Berkshires built due to the fact that they were fitted with every refinement known to the steam locomotive builder's craft. These included roller bearings, cast-steel frames and cylinders, large fireboxes, and a large boiler capacity. Upon arrival to the L&N, the M-1s lacked trailing truck booster units. However, C-2-L units were soon fitted.

=== Big Emma vs Van Sweringen Berkshires ===
The "Big Emmas" bore a strong resemblance to the Van Sweringen Berkshires, which were Berkshires designed for the Nickel Plate Road, Wheeling and Lake Erie Railway, Pere Marquette Railway, and Chesapeake and Ohio Railway. The first of these classes was the Nickel Plate Road S Class, which was based on the C&O’s T-1 class 2-10-4s. The T-1s were also based on the Erie Railroad S-3 Class 2-8-4s. Both designs used 69-inch driving wheels, the same tube diameter, and the same number and size of the flues. They also had the same cylinder bore as the Nickel Plate Road Berkshires and the Wheeling & Lake Erie K-1s, the latter of which were effectively copies of the Nickel Plate Road S Class. The Nickel Plate Road S-2s and Chesapeake & Ohio K-4s, which called their 2-8-4s "Kanawhas", were also equipped with roller bearings like with the Big Emmas. However, the Van Sweringen designs all had Baker valve gear, an engine wheelbase of 42 feet, a boiler pressure of 245 psi, a firebox with 90.3 square feet of grate area, and a cylinder stroke of 34-inches. The Pere Marquette and Chesapeake & Ohio Kanawhas also had a bore of 26-inches, and the Berkshires on the Nickel Plate Road, Pere Marquette, and Chesapeake & Ohio all had 73 tubes. The Wheeling & Lake Erie K-1 Class, meanwhile had 67 tubes. The Big Emmas, meanwhile, had Walschaerts valve gear, a 42-foot 4-inch engine wheelbase, a boiler pressure of 265-psi, a firebox grate area of 90.2 square feet, 25-by-32-inch cylinders, and 62 tubes inside the boiler.

=== Career ===
In service, the M-1s were used on all sorts of duties. These included the Southland and Flamingo passenger trains between Cincinnati, Ohio and Corbin, Kentucky, fast freight trains, and coal trains around Eastern Kentucky, where they regularly hauled trains in excess of 8,000 tons. At 42 miles per hour, the Big Emmas were rated at 4,503 horsepower.

=== Withdrawals and remaining tenders ===
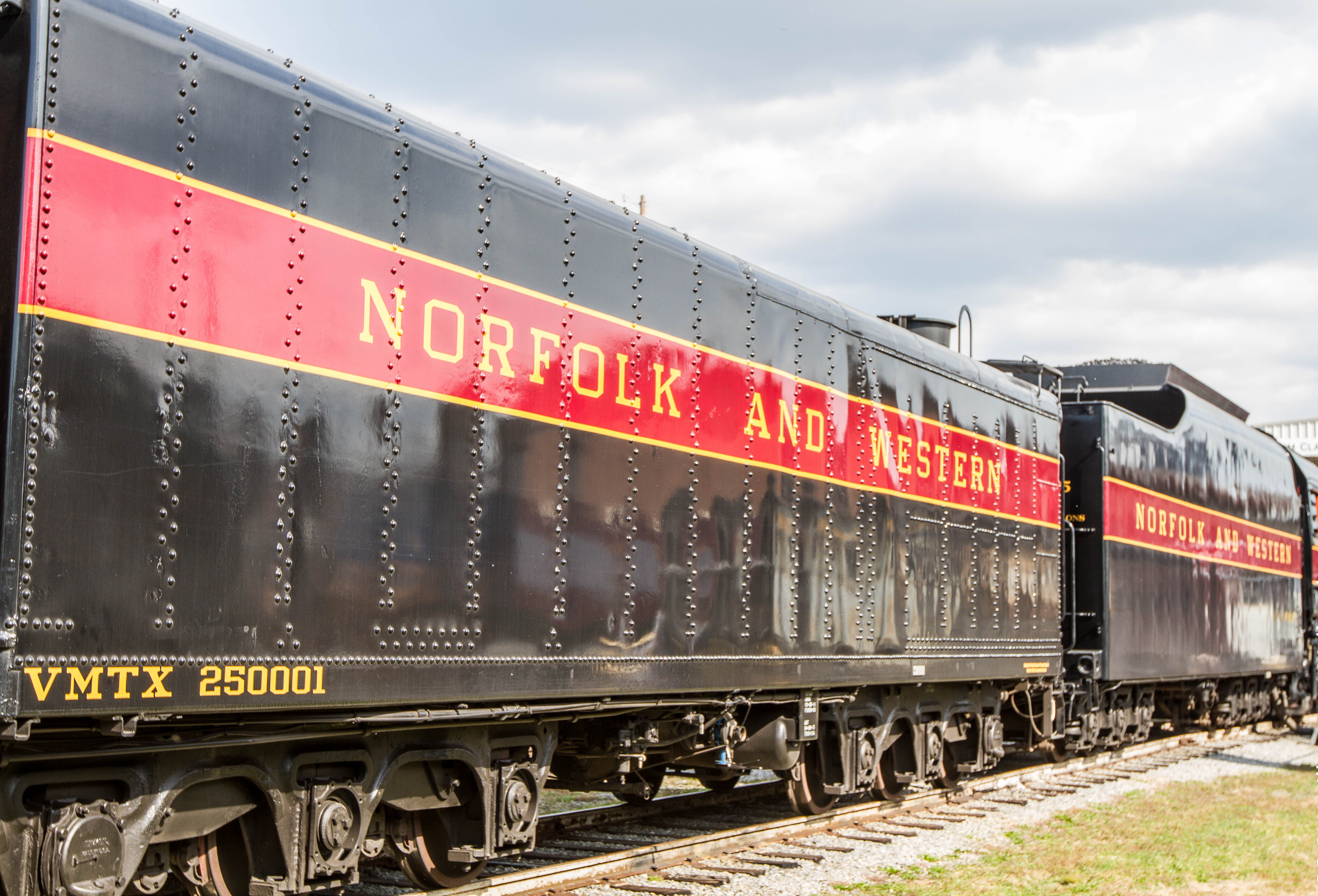
VMTX No. 250001, a former L&N Big Emma tender use as an auxiliary water tender for Norfolk and Western 611

Unfortunately, by 1942, the L&N had already been investing in mainline diesel power. Their first mainline model was the EMD E6. The first batch was retired by December 1950, and the final two batches were retired by November 1956, when steam officially ended on the railroad. By 1957, all of the Big Emmas had been cut up, although most of their tenders were reused for maintenance of way service on the L&N. Some of them were eventually converted to canteens to supply extra water for steam locomotives that were used in main line excursion service such as Southern Railway 4501, Norfolk and Western 611 and 1218; Nickel Plate Road 765 and 587; Chesapeake and Ohio 2716 and 614; and Milwaukee Road 261. The two tenders from Nos. 1966 and 1984 are on static display at the Southeastern Railway Museum in Duluth, Georgia and the Kentucky Railway Museum in New Haven, Kentucky, respectively.

== Bibliography ==
- Johnson, Steven D. (2004). Louisville & Nashville Color Guide to Freight and Passenger Equipment: Volume 2 (1st ed.). Morning Sun Books. ISBN 1-58248-139-3.
