= Chesapeake and Ohio 2716 =

Preserved American 2-8-4 locomotive (C&O K-4 class)

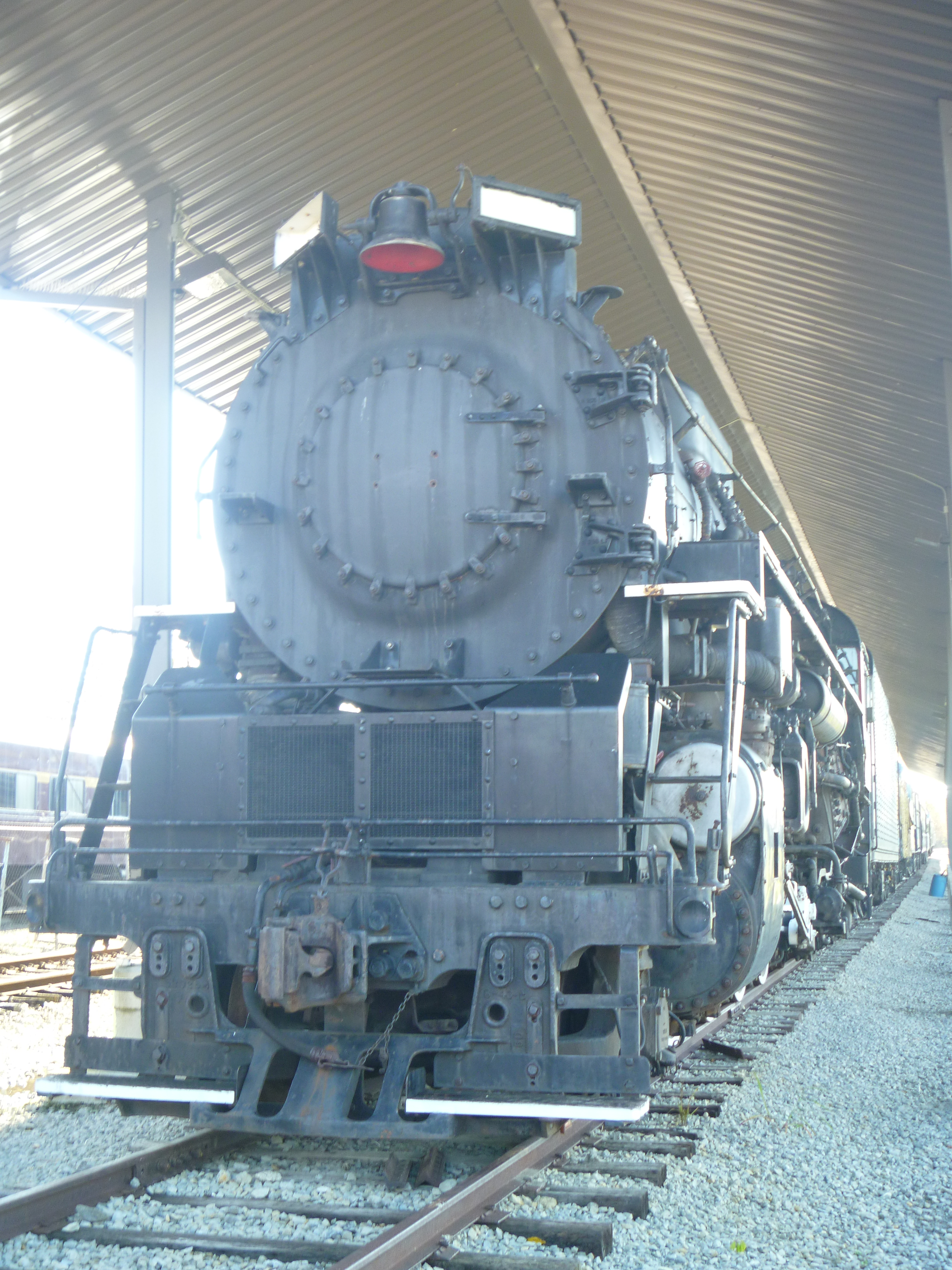
- C&O No. 2716 on display at the Kentucky Railway Museum in November 2013.
Type and origin
- Power type: Steam
- Builder: American Locomotive Company
- Serial number: 70865
- Build date: December 1943
Specifications
- Configuration
  - Whyte: 2-8-4
  - UIC: 1′D2′ h2
- Gauge: 4 ft 8 1/2 in (1,435 mm)
- Leading dia.: 33 in (83.820 cm)
- Driver dia.: 69 in (1.753 m)
- Trailing dia.: 36 in (91.440 cm) (Lead); 43 in (109.220 cm) (Trail)
- Tender wheels: 36 in (91.440 cm)
- Minimum curve: 288 ft (88 m) radius/ 20°
- Wheelbase: 93 ft 2 in (28.40 m) (Total)
- Length: 105 ft 1 7/8 in (32.05 m)
- Width: 10 ft 10 in (3.30 m)
- Height: 15 ft 7 1/2 in (4.76 m)
- Axle load: 73,000 lb (37 short tons)
- Adhesive weight: 292,000 lb (146 short tons)
- Loco weight: 460,000 lb (230 short tons)
- Tender weight: 390,000 lb (200 short tons)
- Total weight: 850,000 lb (420 short tons)
- Tender type: 21-RG
- Fuel type: Coal (to be converted to fuel oil)
- Fuel capacity: 30 short tons (27 t)
- Water cap.: 21,000 US gallons (79,000 L; 17,000 imp gal)
- Firebox
  - Grate area: 90 sq ft (8.4 m^{2})
- Boiler
  - Model: Fire Tube
  - Diameter: 98 in (2,489 mm)
  - Tube plates: 19 ft (6 m)
- Boiler pressure: 245 psi (1.69 MPa)
- Feedwater heater: Worthington 5 1/2 SA; 10,200 US gallon / hr capacity
- Heating surface
  - Firebox: 465 sq ft (43.2 m^{2})
  - Tubes and flues: 4,308 sq ft (400.2 m^{2})
  - Total surface: 4,773 sq ft (443.4 m^{2})
- Superheater
  - Type: Type E
  - Heating area: 1,932 sq ft (179.5 m^{2})
- Cylinders: Two, outside
- Cylinder size: 26 in × 34 in (660 mm × 864 mm)
- Valve gear: Baker
- Valve type: Piston valves
- Valve travel: 8 in (203 mm)
- Valve lap: 1 11/16 in (43 mm)
- Valve lead: 3/16 in (5 mm)
- Train heating: Steam heat
- Loco brake: Pneumatic, Schedule 8-ET
- Train brakes: Pneumatic
- Couplers: Knuckle
Performance figures
- Maximum speed: 70 mph (112.65 km/h)
- Tractive effort: 69,350 lbf (308.48 kN) (Engine); 14,000 lbf (62.28 kN) (Booster); 83,350 lbf (370.76 kN) (Total)
- Factor of adh.: 4.21 (Engine); 4.6 (Booster)
Career
- Operators: Chesapeake and Ohio Railway (1943–1956); Southern Railway (leased from 1981–1982); Fort Wayne Railroad Historical Society (leased from 1995–1996); Kentucky Steam Heritage Corporation (leased from 2021–present)
- Class: K-4
- Number in class: 17 of 90
- Numbers: C&O 2716; SOU 2716; L&N 1992 (cosmetically)
- Nicknames: Kanawha
- Locale: Eastern United States
- Delivered: December 1943
- Retired: 1956 (revenue service); 1982 (1st excursion service); October 1996 (2nd excursion service)
- Preserved: 1959
- Restored: October 10, 1981 (1st excursion service); July 1996 (2nd excursion service)
- Current owner: Kentucky Railway Museum; Kentucky Steam Heritage Corporation (leased operator)
- Disposition: Undergoing restoration to operating condition

Chesapeake and Ohio Railway 2716 is a preserved K4 Class 2-8-4 "Berkshire" type steam locomotive, built in 1943 by the American Locomotive Company (ALCO) for the Chesapeake and Ohio Railway (C&O). While most railroads referred to these 2-8-4 type locomotives as Berkshires, the C&O referred to them as Kanawhas after the Kanawha River, which flows through West Virginia. Used as a dual service locomotive, No. 2716 and its classmates served the C&O in a variety of duties until being retired from revenue service in 1956.

Donated to the Kentucky Railway Museum of New Haven, Kentucky in 1959, No. 2716 has been restored to operation in excursion service twice since its retirement from the C&O, first in 1981 for the Southern Railway's steam program until 1982, and again in 1996 for a few brief excursions for the Fort Wayne Railroad Historical Society (FWRHS) in New Haven, Indiana. The locomotive is undergoing an extensive rebuild to operating condition for a third excursion career, under lease by the Kentucky Steam Heritage Corporation.

== History ==
=== Revenue service and first retirement ===
No. 2716 was the seventeenth member of 90 class "K-4" Kanawhas built for the C&O by the American Locomotive Company (ALCO) and the Lima Locomotive Works (LLW) between 1943 and 1947. These locomotives were used to haul heavy freight trains, as well as fast passenger trains. After only thirteen years in revenue service, the C&O retired No. 2716 in 1956 in light of dieselization. The C&O sold the majority of their Kanawhas for scrap, save for thirteen locomotives, including No. 2716. In May 1959, the locomotive was donated to the Kentucky Railway Museum (KRM) in New Haven, Kentucky, where it was left on display.

=== Clinchfield restoration attempt ===
By early 1979, the Clinchfield Railroad (CRR) operated a steam excursion program under the leadership of general manager Thomas D. Moore Jr., using 4-6-0 No. 1, but at the request of their parent company, the Family Lines, the CRR began searching for a larger steam locomotive to expand the program. The railroad subsequently reached an agreement with the KRM to lease and operate No. 2716, and in March 1979, the locomotive was towed to Marion, North Carolina to be operationally restored. (Note: The CRR simultaneously attempted to lease and restore Nashville, Chattanooga and St. Louis 576, but its city of Nashville, Tennessee, owners decided against the proposal. The city subsequently changed their minds and negotiated with the Family Lines to lease and restore No. 576, but to no avail.)

In May, as No. 2716 was being disassembled, crews encountered multiple mechanical problems inside the boiler. Later that same month, the Family Lines cancelled the Clinchfield steam program and No. 2716's restoration, when Moore was forced to resign for participating in a scandal to defraud the CRR. In late 1979, the CRR returned the partially-disassembled No. 2716 to the KRM, and they paid the museum some compensation cash for not reassembling the locomotive.

=== Southern excursion service and second retirement ===
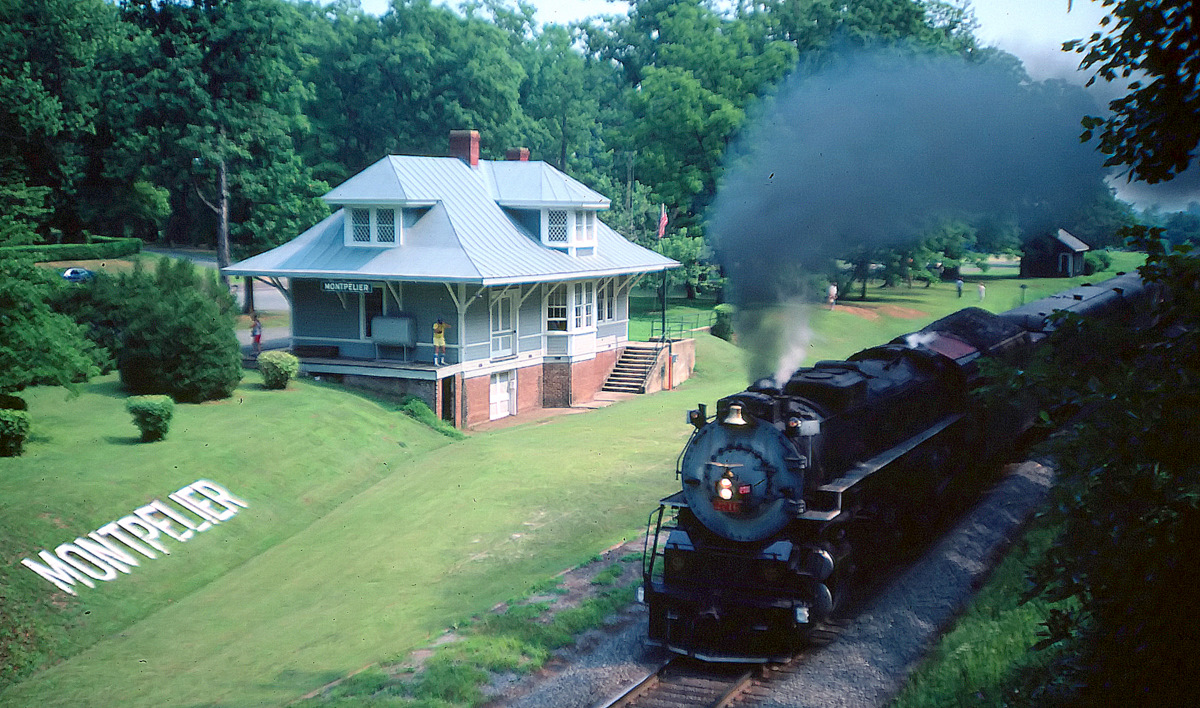
No. 2716 pulling a SOU excursion at Montpelier, Virginia, in July 1982

In early 1980, No. 2716 was leased by the Southern Railway (SOU) to pull the longer and heavier passenger trains for their ever popular steam excursion program, serving as a replacement for Texas and Pacific 610 and Canadian Pacific 2839. The SOU sent No. 2716 to their steam locomotive workshop in Irondale, Alabama, where Master Mechanic Bill Purdie significantly altered the locomotive's appearance to appear as if the SOU had purchased a 2-8-4 type from new. No. 2716 was painted black with gold pinstriping, while the front smokebox plate was painted in a lighter graphite color. The headlight was moved from its pilot to the center of its smokebox door, decorated with brass candlesticks, and a brass eagle ornament. Additionally, the locomotive had its bell swinging from the top of its smokebox and carried the round "SR" emblems on its air compressor shields.

After operating on a test run on October 10-11, 1981, No. 2716 pulled its first SOU excursions on October 17, 18, 24 and 25, running the Tennessee Valley Railroad Museum's (TVRM) 13th annual Autumnn Leaf Special from Chattanooga, Tennessee to Emory Gap, Tennessee, where the diesels would take over for the trip up to Crossville, Tennessee on former Tennessee Central (TC) rails. On the last day of October and the rest of November that year, No. 2716 pulled round-trip excursions out of Atlanta, Georgia and Birmingham, Alabama to Toccoa, Georgia and Opelika, Alabama, respectively. In April 1982, No. 2716 resumed its excursion duties, pulling trains through North Carolina, South Carolina, Tennessee, and Virginia. But in August 1982, a very inexperienced fireman damaged the locomotive's firebox, resulting No. 2716 to be taken out of excursion service for repairs, and Nickel Plate Road No. 765, another 2-8-4, based in Indiana, was briefly borrowed to fill in.

Following the merger between the Southern and the Norfolk and Western (N&W) railways to form the new Norfolk Southern Railway, ex-N&W No. 611 entered service and began serving as the main motive power for the steam program, followed by ex-N&W No. 1218 in 1987. In 1985, No. 2716 was retired from the program and left in storage at the Irondale workshop, after attempts to weld cracks in the firebox failed.

=== Brief excursion service with FWRHS and third retirement ===
After Norfolk Southern ended their steam program in late 1994, the Fort Wayne Railroad Historical Society (FWRHS), the owner of NKP No. 765, reached an agreement with the Kentucky Railway Museum to sign a new lease for No. 2716. At the time, No. 765 was out of service for an overhaul, and the society opted to utilize No. 2716 to cover their own excursion operations. In January 1995, the locomotive was moved to the FWRHS' location in New Haven, Indiana, and work began to revert it to its C&O livery and to repair its firebox with new sheets and patches. By July 15, 1996, repairs on No. 2716 were completed, and the locomotive made its break-in run with a freight train over the Toledo, Peoria and Western (TP&W) mainline around Logansport. On July 20-21, No. 2716 pulled some excursions on the TP&W and the Winamac Southern (WSRY) during the Logansport Iron Horse Festival.

The FWRHS created a schedule for No. 2716 to pull additional excursion trains in 1997, but all of them were cancelled, when the Federal Railroad Administration (FRA) declined to allow the locomotive any flue extensions and ordered for new flues to be installed. The FWRHS then decided to give up on operating No. 2716 and concentrate their efforts and investment on rebuilding No. 765. In February 2001, No. 2716 was towed back to the KRM, and the locomotive remained on static display there for the next sixteen years.

=== Third restoration ===
On February 7, 2016, the Kentucky Steam Heritage Corporation (KSHC) was formed and announced that it had signed a long-term lease with the Kentucky Railway Museum to restore and operate No. 2716. During which, No. 2716's appearance was temporarily altered to resemble a Louisville and Nashville M-1 Big Emma locomotive with the fictitious No. 1992 for the annual L&N Historical Society convention. In May 2018, the KSHC partnered with the CSX Transportation to move the locomotive to a former Louisville and Nashville rail yard in Ravenna, Kentucky to build a new rail-based tourist and community development center. In November 2018, the KSHC acquired three pieces of rolling stock from the Indiana Transportation Museum (ITM) such as an auxiliary tender No. 251958, an ex-Pennsylvania Railroad (PRR) railway post office car No. 6565, and baggage car No. 9036 for use behind No. 2716.

In January 2019, the Big Rivers Electric Corporation in Henderson, Kentucky salvaged a pair of Buckeye three-axle, roller bearing trucks from a flatcar, which was abandoned at their facility property in Hawesville, Kentucky; and donated them to the KSHC to replace the old friction bearing trucks underneath No. 2716's tender. From July 26 to 28, 2019, No. 2716 was moved out of the Kentucky Railway Museum for the first time in 18 years and went to Ravenna, Kentucky for restoration along with the help of CSX Transportation and R.J. Corman Railroad Group. (Note: It was moved for the second time by the Clinchfield EMD F7 diesel locomotive No. 800, which had previously moved No. 2716 to Marion, North Carolina for restoration in 1979.) The locomotive was officially moved into the Ravenna workshop on July 31 and the restoration work on No. 2716 started shortly after. During the restoration work, the locomotive's firebox side sheets, which were patched up twice during its two previous restorations in 1981 and 1996, were replaced with newly fabricated ones.

In March 2022, the KSHC was in exchange with the Pueblo Railway Museum (PRM) in Pueblo, Colorado to swap out two of No. 2716's inoperable air compressors with two operational air compressors that came off of PRM's inoperable Santa Fe Class 2900 steam locomotive No. 2912. In September 2022, the KSHC purchased new boiler flues from the Hoosier Valley Railroad Museum's nearly identical No. 2789 locomotive for use on the former's No. 2716 locomotive.

The KSHC announced in June 2023 that No. 2716's firebox will eventually be modified to burn fuel oil instead of coal. In October 2023, the KSHC received $1.9 million from the Government of Kentucky to aid the locomotive's restoration and its potential area. In November 2023, No. 2716's original feedwater pump was removed to replace the damaged one on Spokane, Portland and Seattle 700 in Portland, Oregon, while the former would eventually receive a replacement pump from the Santa Fe No. 2912 locomotive. Once the restoration work is finished, the No. 2716 locomotive will eventually visit the Railroad Museum of New England, running on the Naugatuck Railroad in Connecticut.

== See also ==
- Chesapeake and Ohio 614
- Chesapeake and Ohio 2755
- Pere Marquette 1225
- Texas and Pacific 610

== Bibliography ==
- Boyd, Ken (2014). The Art of the Locomotive (1st ed.). Voyageur Press. ISBN 978-0-7603-4691-4.
- Drury, George (2015). Guide to North American Steam Locomotives, Revised Edition (2nd ed.). Kalmbach Media. ISBN 978-1-62700-259-2.
- Wrinn, Jim (2000). Steam's Camelot: Southern and Norfolk Southern Excursions in Color (1st ed.). TLC Publishing. ISBN 1-883089-56-5.
