= JNR Class D60 =

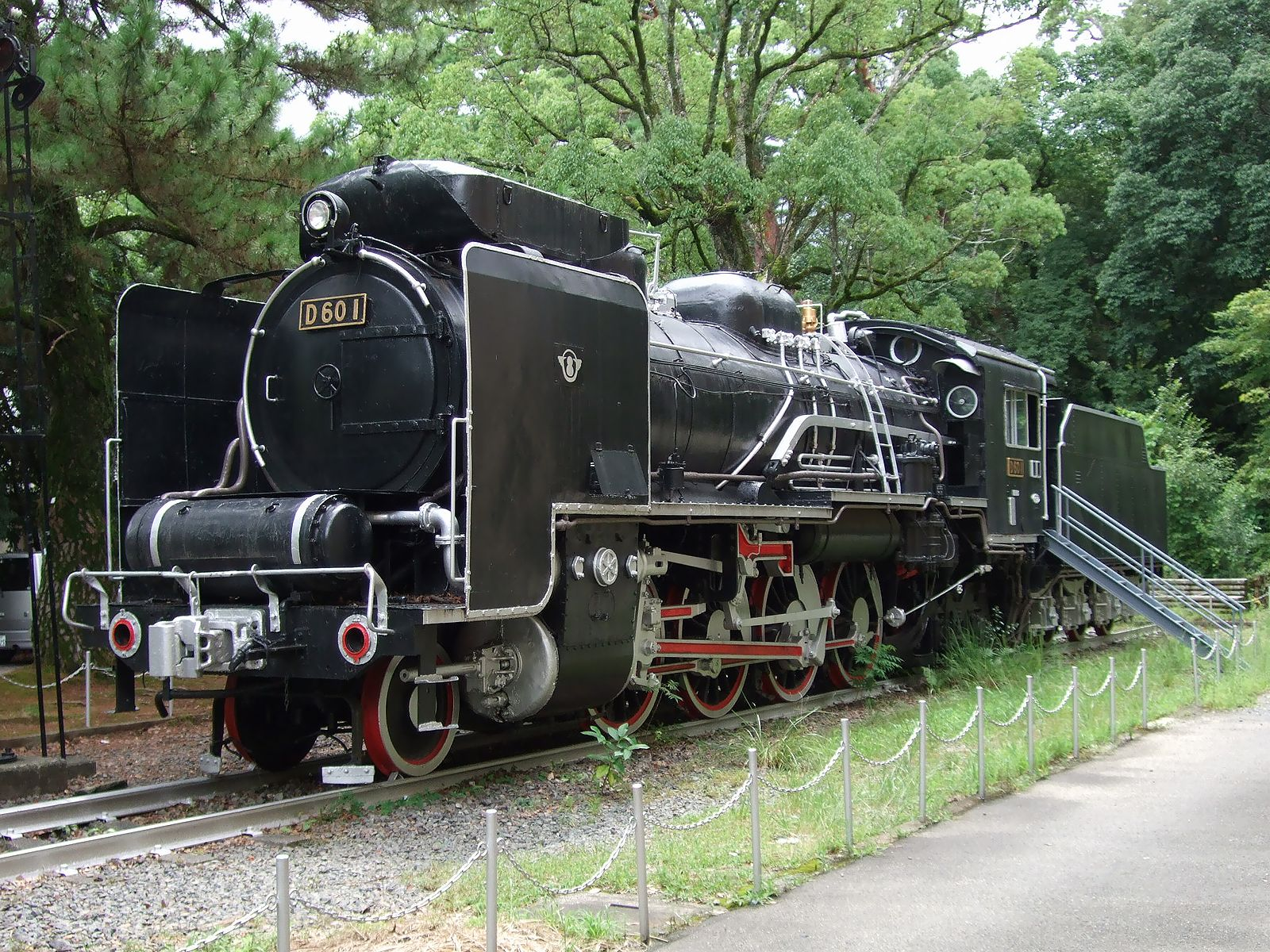
- D60 1 preserved at Yamaguchi Prefectural Museum
Type and origin
- Power type: Steam
- Designer: Hideo Shima
- Rebuilder: JNR Hamamatsu, Nagano, and Tsuchizaki Works
- Rebuild date: 1951-1956
- Number rebuilt: 78
Specifications
- Configuration
  - Whyte: 2-8-4
  - UIC: 1'D2' h2
- Gauge: 1,067 mm (3 ft 6 in)
- Driver dia.: 1,400 mm (4 ft 7 in)
- Length: 20,030 mm (65 ft 9 in)
- Height: 3,955 mm (12 ft 11.7 in)
- Axle load: 13.76 t (13.54 long tons; 15.17 short tons)
- Loco weight: 81.56 t (80.27 long tons; 89.90 short tons)
- Tender weight: 49 t (48 long tons; 54 short tons)
- Fuel capacity: 12 t (12 long tons; 13 short tons)
- Water cap.: 17 m^{3} (600 cu ft; 3,700 imp gal; 4,500 US gal)
- Firebox
  - Grate area: 3.25 m^{2} (35.0 sq ft)
- Boiler pressure: 13 kgf/cm^{2} (180 psi; 1.3 MPa)
- Heating surface: 212.30 m^{2} (2,285.2 sq ft)
- Cylinders: Two, outside
- Cylinder size: 550 mm × 660 mm (22 in × 26 in)
Career
- Operators: Japanese National Railways
- Withdrawn: 1966-1974
- Preserved: 4
- Disposition: Four preserved, remainder scrapped

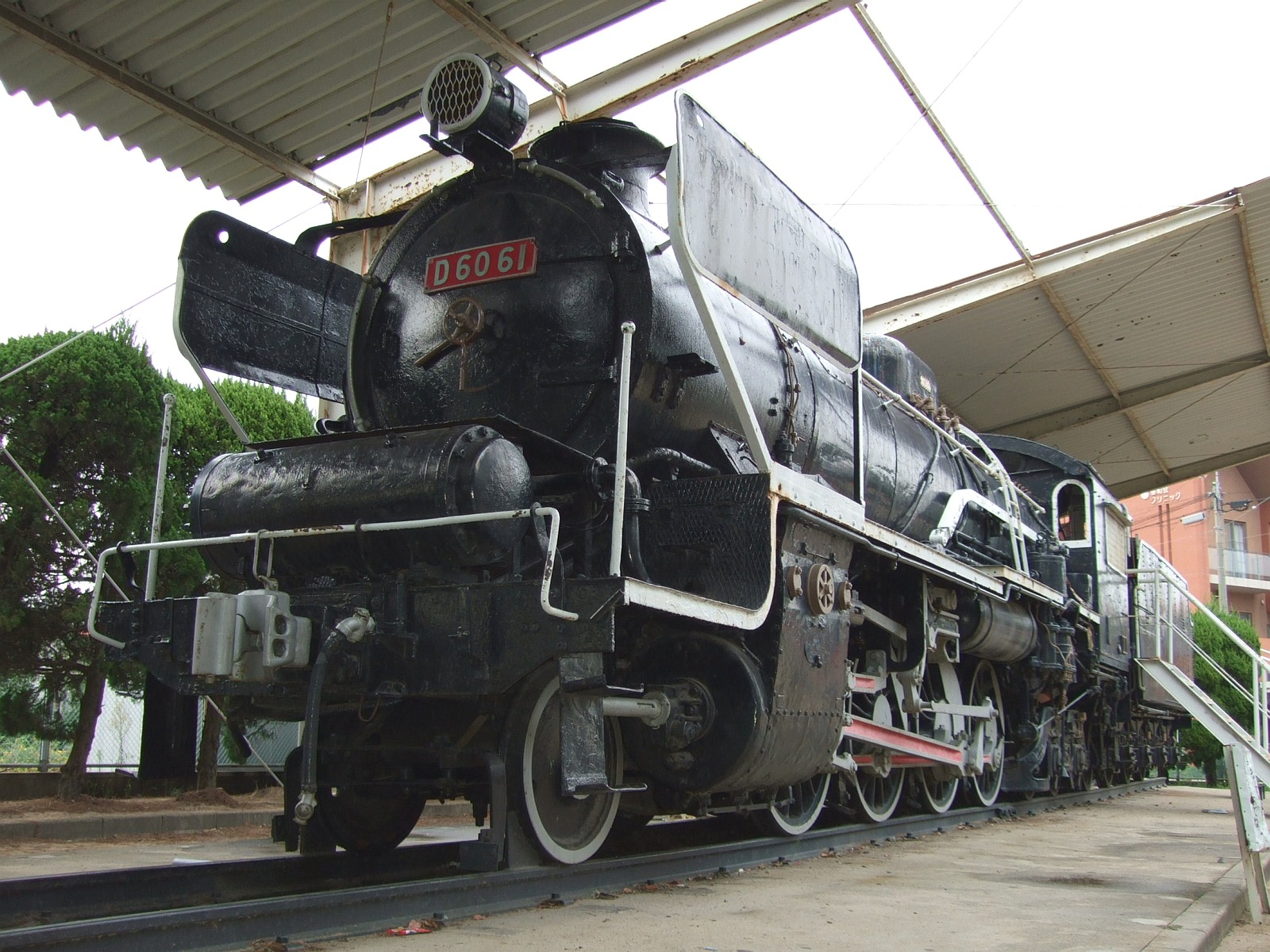
D60 61 preserved at park in Ashiya, Fukuoka

The Class D60 (D60形) is a Japanese 2-8-4 Berkshire wheel arrangement steam locomotive type created by rebuilding an earlier class to suit postwar requirements. 78 of the 380 successful, powerful prewar Class D50 2-8-2 Mikado locomotives were rebuilt and redesigned as D60s between 1951 and 1956 by Hideo Shima at the JNR Hamamatsu (Nagoya) Region, Nagano, (Nagoya) Region, and Tsuchizaki, (Sendai) Region workshops. As with the rebuilding of Class D51 to Class D61 and Class D52 to Class D62 locomotives, an additional trailing axle was included to reduce the heavy axle load of the D50 and allow more widespread use. The cylinder diameter was reduced from 570 mm on the D50s to 550 mm to minimize wheel spin, and they were built to replace the older Class 9600s in 1951. The D60s have a top speed of 80 km/h (50 mph).

The spread of electrification and increasing numbers of diesel locomotives resulted in the first D60s being withdrawn from 1966. A few examples based at Wakamatsu Depot soldiered on, hauling coal trains on the Chikuhō Mainline in northern Kyushu, and the last member of the class (D60 61) was finally withdrawn in August 1974. Four have been preserved while the remainder were scrapped.

== Locomotive build details ==
Numbers	Former numbers	Rebuilt at	Date
D60 1-D60 10	D50 162/D50 44/D50 305/D50 116/D50 169/D50 199/D50 81/D50 168/D50 47/D50 211	JNR Hamamatsu Works	Originally built as Class D50 2-8-2 in 1925-1927. Rebuilt 1951. Retired 1966-1967
D60 11-D60 28	D50 14/D50 175/D50 202/D50 225/D50 123/D50 71/D50 127/D50 226/D50 244/D50 163/D50 133/D50 85/D50 88/D50 337/D50 289/D50 106/D50 237/D50 306	JNR Hamamatsu Works	Originally built as Class D50 2-8-2 in 1925-1928. Rebuilt 1952. Retired 1968-1969
D60 29-D60 30	D50 112/D50 65	JNR Hamamatsu Works	Originally built as Class D50 2-8-2 in 1925-1926. Rebuilt 1953. Retired 1969-1970
D60 31-D60 34	D50 302/D50 73/D50 317/D50 145	JNR Nagano Works	Originally built as Class D50 2-8-2 in 1925-1929. Rebuilt 1952. Retired 1970
D60 35-D60 39	D50 149/D50 141/D50 160/D50 126/D50 216	JNR Nagano Works	Originally built as Class D50 2-8-2 in 1926-1927. Rebuilt 1953. Retired 1971
D60 40-D60 44	D50 128/D50 333/D50 248/D50 113/D50 31	JNR Hamamatsu Works	Originally built as Class D50 2-8-2 in 1924-1929. Rebuilt 1953. Retired 1971-1972
D60 45-D60 62	D50 32/D50 157/D50 326/D50 35/D50 247/D50 159/D50 354/D50 192/D50 34/D50 51/D50 99/D50 265/D50 40/D50 197/D50 120/D50 152/D50 282/D50 229	JNR Hamamatsu Works	Originally built as Class D50 2-8-2 in 1924-1930. Rebuilt 1954. Retired 1972-1974
D60 63-D60 69	D50 351/D50 283/D50 191/D50 36/D50 228/D50 136/D50 33	JNR Hamamatsu Works	Originally built as Class D50 2-8-2 in 1924-1930. Rebuilt 1955. Retired 1973-1974
D60 70	D50 111	JNR Nagano Works	Originally built as Class D50 2-8-2 in 1926. Rebuilt 1955. Retired 1973-1974
D60 71-D60 72	D50 95/D50 93	JNR Tsuchizaki Works	Originally built as Class D50 2-8-2 in 1925. Rebuilt 1955. Retired 1973-1974
D60 73	D50 278	JNR Nagano Works	Originally built as Class D50 2-8-2 in 1928. Rebuilt 1956. Retired 1973-1974
D60 74-D60 75	D50 57/D50 91	JNR Tsuchizaki Works	Originally built as Class D50 2-8-2 in 1925. Rebuilt 1955. Retired 1974
D60 76-D60 78	D50 96/D50 219/D50 67	JNR Hamamatsu Works	Originally built as Class D50 2-8-2 in 1925-1927. Rebuilt 1956. Retired 1974

== Preserved examples ==
- D60 1 (Formerly D50 162 originally built in 1927) In grounds of Yamaguchi Prefectural Museum
- D60 27 (Formerly D50 237 originally built in 1928) Park in Tachibana Fukuoka Prefecture, (in poor condition)
- D60 46 (Formerly D50 157 originally built in 1927) Park in Iizuka Fukuoka, Prefecture
- D60 61 (Formerly D50 282 originally built in 1928) Park in Ashiya Fukuoka, Prefecture

== See also ==
- Japan Railways locomotive numbering and classification
