= D50 class =

D50 class or Class D50 may refer to:

- New South Wales D50 class locomotive
- JNR Class D50
