= Class 61 =

Class 61 may refer to:

- DRG Class 61 - a class of streamlined German tank locomotives
- JNR Class C61 - a class of Japanese 4-6-4 locomotives
- JNR Class D61 - a class of Japanese 2-8-4 locomotives
- KTM Class 61 - a class of Malaysian 4-car diesel multiple units
