= JNR Class D50 =

Class of 380 Japanese 2-8-2 locomotives

Japanese National Ry Class D50 China Railways 解放_{16} class
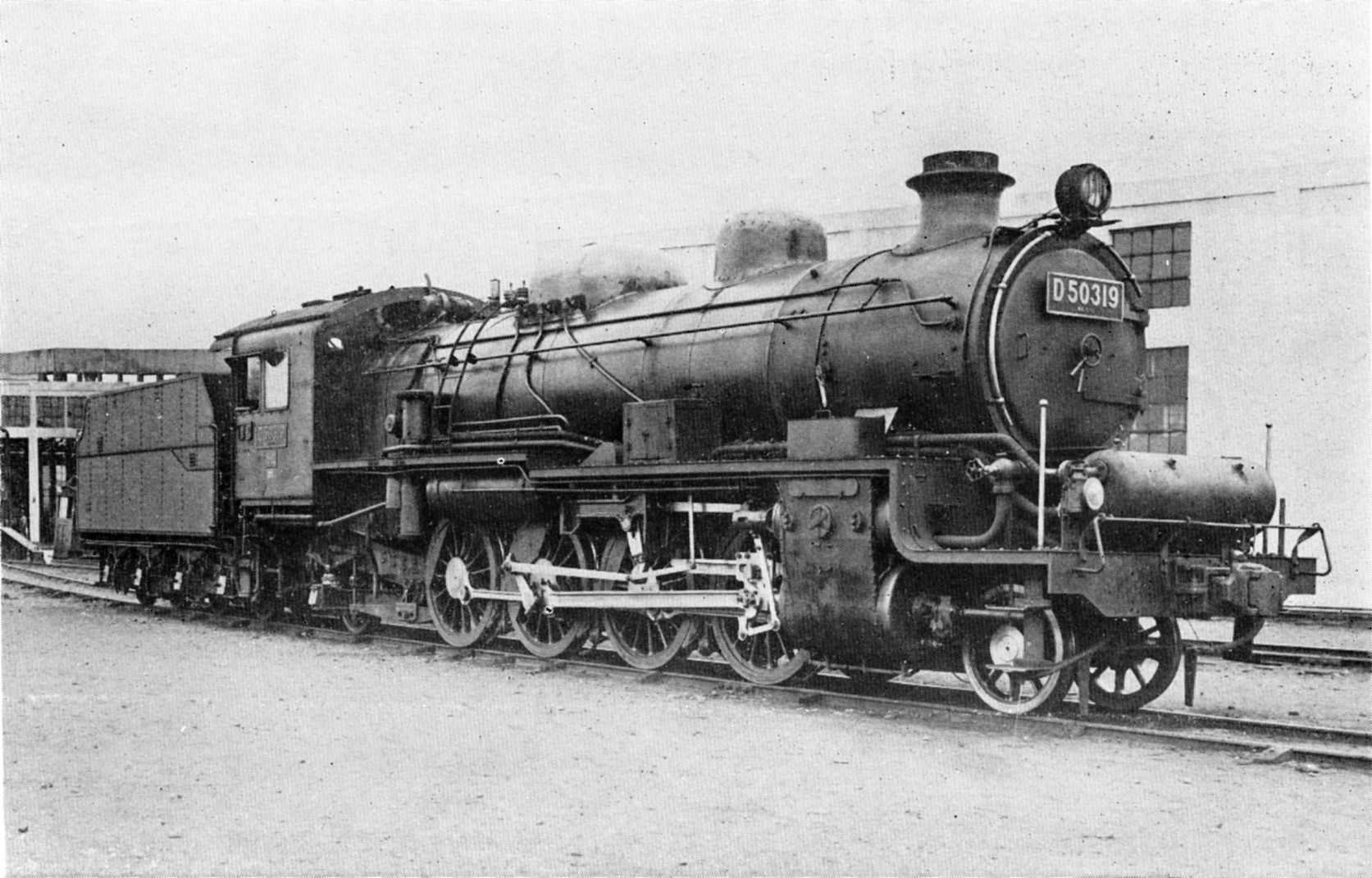
- D50 319 in 1935
Type and origin
- Power type: Steam
- Designer: Tokichi Ogasawara and Hideo Shima
- Builder: Kawasaki (204); Hitachi (80); Kisha Seizō (69); Nippon Sharyō (27)
- Build date: 1923–1931
- Total produced: 380
Specifications
- Configuration
  - Whyte: 2-8-2
  - UIC: 1′D1′ h2
- Gauge: 1,067 mm (3 ft 6 in)
- Driver dia.: 1,400 mm (55.12 in)
- Length: 17,248 mm (56 ft 7 in)
- Height: 3,955 mm (12 ft 11 3/4 in)
- Axle load: 14.70 tonnes (14.47 long tons; 16.20 short tons)
- Loco weight: 78.14 tonnes (76.91 long tons; 86.13 short tons)
- Tender weight: 49 tonnes (48 long tons; 54 short tons)
- Fuel type: Coal
- Firebox
  - Grate area: 3.25 m^{2} (35.0 sq ft)
- Boiler
  - Tube plates: 5,500 millimetres (18 ft 1/2 in)
  - Small tubes: 57 mm (2 1/4 in), 90 off
  - Large tubes: 140 mm (5 1/2 in), 28 off
- Boiler pressure: 13.0 kg/cm^{2} (1.27 MPa; 185 psi)
- Heating surface
  - Firebox: 13.5 m^{2} (145 sq ft)
  - Tubes and flues: 142.7 m^{2} (1,536 sq ft)
- Superheater
  - Heating area: 64.4 m^{2} (693 sq ft)
- Cylinders: Two, outside
- Cylinder size: 570 mm × 660 mm (22 7/16 in × 26 in)
Performance figures
- Maximum speed: 70 km/h (43 mph)
- Tractive effort: 165.977 kN (37,313 lbf)
Career
- Operators: Japanese Government Railways; Japanese National Railways; Jichang Jidun Railway; Manchukuo National Railway; Central China Railway; China Railway
- Class: JGR: 9900 → D50; JNR: D50; CCR: D50; CR: ㄇㄎ_{16} → 解放_{16}
- Numbers: D50 1-D50 380 (formerly 9900-9999,19900-19999,29900-29975)
- Retired: 1965
- Preserved: D50 25, D50 140
- Disposition: 2 preserved (both in Japan), remainder scrapped

The Class D50 is a type of 2-8-2 "Mikado" type steam locomotive built by the Japanese Government Railways (JGR), the Japanese National Railways (JNR) and various manufacturers from 1923 to 1931. The class name indicates that the locomotive has four sets of driving wheels (D) and belongs to one of the classes of tender locomotive allocated a number in the series 50 to 99 in the Japan Railways locomotive numbering and classification scheme of 1928. Hideo Shima designed the rest of the class until 1931.

The design of the D50 was based on the JNR Class 9600 which was introduced in 1916. A total of 380 Class D50 locomotives were built. Between 1951 and 1956 78 were rebuilt to JNR Class D60 2-8-4 Berkshire’s by the JNR. This class would later form the JNR Class D51.

== Service in China ==
=== Manchukuo National Railway ===
In 1923, sixteen D50 class locomotives were exported to the Jichang Jidun Railway in Manchuria, which designated them class 500 and numbered 501 through 516. Ten were built by Kawasaki (works nos. 970−971, 1140−1170) and six by Kisha Seizō (w/n 965−970), and though very similar to the Japanese D50 class, there were some slight differences in dimensions due to the larger loading gauge on Chinese lines. After the establishment of Manchukuo, the Jichang Jidun Railway was nationalised along with other private railways to form the Manchukuo National Railway. The MNR classified these Mikana (ミカナ) class, numbered 6540−6555, renumbered 501−516 in 1938. After the establishment of the People's Republic of China, China Railways designated them ㄇㄎ_{5} (MK_{5}) class in 1951, and subsequently 解放_{5} (JF_{5}) class in 1959.

=== Central China Railway ===
In 1939, D50 193 was converted to standard gauge and shipped to the Central China Railway, where it operated primarily between Nanjing and Shanghai. This engine lasted in service on China Railways until 1955.

=== China Railways ===
After the establishment of the People's Republic of China, all the railways of China were taken over by the China Railway, which classified the D50s as ㄇㄎ_{16} (MK_{16}) class in 1951, later becoming class 解放_{16}(JF_{16}). This class retired 1955.

== Preserved examples ==
Two D50s are preserved in Japan.

- D50 25: In a park in Kitami, Hokkaido
- D50 140: At the Kyoto Railway Museum
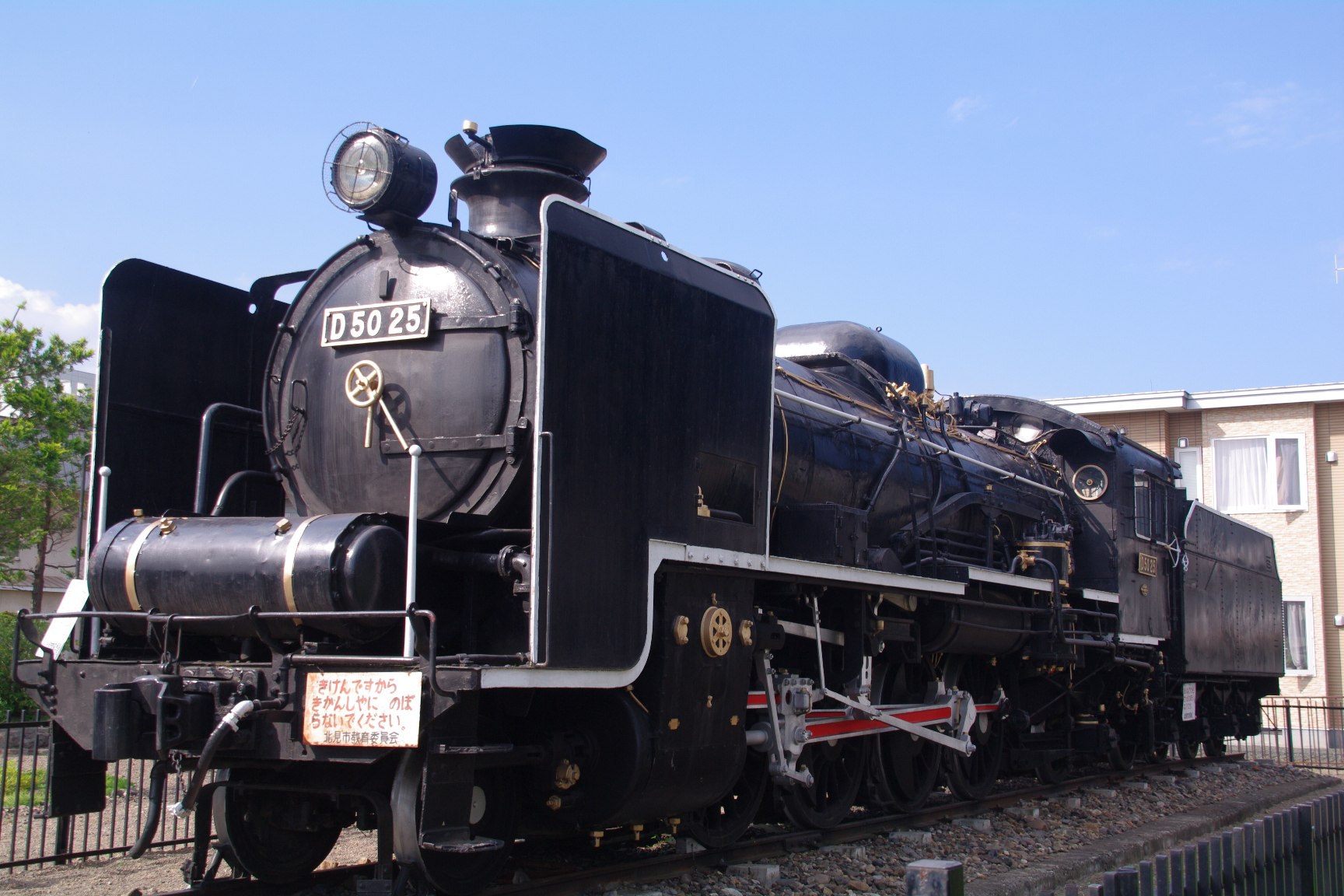
D50 25 in Kitami, Hokkaido

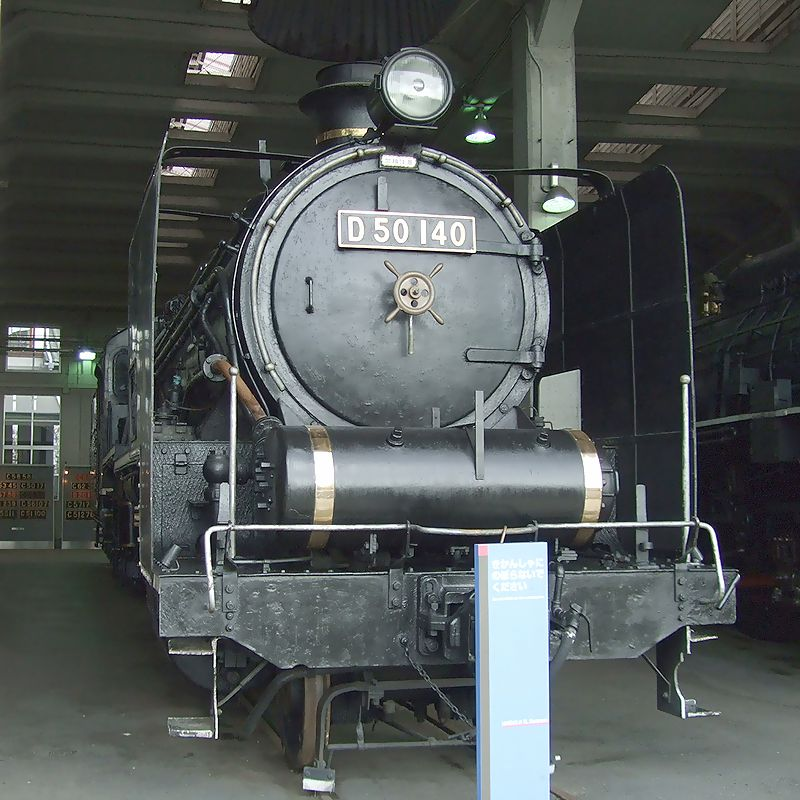
D50 140 at Umekoji Steam Locomotive Museum

== See also ==
- Japan Railways locomotive numbering and classification
- JNR Class 9600
- JNR Class D51
- JNR Class D52
- JNR Class D60
- JNR Class D61
- JNR Class D62
