= Parovoz IS =

Russian railroading website

Steam Engine IS
- Available in: Russian
- Founded: November 22, 1995
- Creator: Dmitry Zinoviev
- Website: www.parovoz.com
- Commercial: no
- Current status: Active

Steam Engine IS (also known as Parovoz IS and parovoz.com) is the oldest railroading site of the Runet.

== History ==
The site was created on November 22, 1995, by Dmitry Zinoviev (author), a PhD student of SUNY at Stony Brook. It was initially called "Railroad Maps" and was hosted by the university Web server. The birth of the site was registered by Artemy Lebedev in his Book of Records NZhMD. Thus, parovoz.com was the first site about Russian Railways, one of the first sites about railways in general, and one of the first Runet sites.

After some time the site was renamed Steam Engine IS and partially translated into English. In the USSR, a steam locomotive with this name was actually produced (IS steam locomotive, short for Joseph Stalin), and this steam locomotive was considered one of the best Soviet steam locomotives, the pride of the Soviet steam locomotive industry.

The site was nominated for the ROTOR award. For a long time, it was the only most complete reference book on the Runet on the topic of Russian railway transport. Because of this, people often mistook it for the Russian Railways website, and therefore the main page still contains the warning "This site is not the official website of Russian Railways".

== Functionality ==
Steam Engine IS is one of the world's largest railroad sites. As of June 2016, the site has 397 thousand photos on the railway theme, 4 thousand photos of disassembled and abandoned lines, 50 thousand photos of narrow-gauge railways, 47 thousand photos of railways around the world, and 48 thousand photos of city transport, maps, and diagrams ( including the first online detailed diagram of post-Soviet railways), timetables (including the first online full interactive train timetables in Russia, the Commonwealth of Independent States, and the Baltics), news, analytical articles, a reference book of technical and historical information about railways, anecdotes and much more. An extensive collection of links to Internet resources dedicated to the railways and subways of the USSR is collected in the "Railway Ring". Attached to the site is the "Younger Brother" encyclopedia about narrow-gauge railways in the post-Soviet space.

== See also ==
- Russian locomotive class IS
- Railroading
