= Pere Marquette 1223 =

Preserved PM N-1 class 2-8-4 locomotive

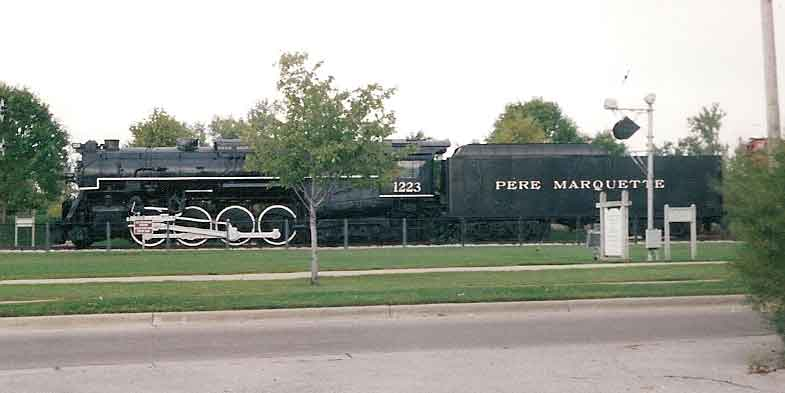
Type and origin
- Power type: Steam
- Builder: Lima Locomotive Works
- Serial number: 7837
- Build date: November 1941
Specifications
- Configuration
  - Whyte: 2-8-4
  - UIC: 1′D2′ h2
- Gauge: 4 ft 8 1/2 in (1,435 mm) standard gauge
- Leading dia.: 36 in (0.91 m)
- Driver dia.: 69 in (1.75 m)
- Trailing dia.: 43 in (1.09 m)
- Length: 101 ft 8 in (30.99 m)
- Height: 15 ft 8 in (4.78 m)
- Adhesive weight: 277,600 lb (125,900 kilograms; 125.9 tonnes)
- Loco weight: 442,500 lb (200,700 kilograms; 200.7 tonnes)
- Total weight: 802,500 lb (364,000 kilograms; 364.0 tonnes)
- Fuel type: Coal
- Fuel capacity: 44,000 lb (20,000 kilograms; 20 tonnes)
- Water cap.: 22,000 US gal (83,000 L; 18,000 imp gal)
- Fuel consumption: 1 short ton (0.91 t; 0.89 long tons) of coal per 12 miles (19 km) travelled (1 tonne every 21 km)
- Firebox
  - Grate area: 90.3 sq ft (8.4 m^{2})
- Boiler pressure: 245 psi (1.69 MPa)
- Cylinders: Two, outside
- Cylinder size: 26 in × 34 in (660 mm × 864 mm)
- Valve gear: Baker
- Valve type: Piston valves
- Loco brake: Air
- Train brakes: Air
- Couplers: Knuckle
Performance figures
- Maximum speed: 70 mph (113 km/h)
- Power output: 2,979 hp (2.22 MW)
- Tractive effort: 69,350 lbf (308.5 kN)
Career
- Operators: Pere Marquette Railway; Chesapeake and Ohio Railway
- Class: PM N-1; C&O N-1
- Number in class: 8 of 12
- Numbers: PM 1223; C&O 2657 (never renumbered)
- Nicknames: The Forgotten N-1
- Locale: Michigan
- Retired: 1951
- Preserved: 1981
- Restored: 1989 (cosmetically)
- Current owner: The City of Grand Haven
- Disposition: On static display
- Pere Marquette Railway Locomotive #1223
- U.S. National Register of Historic Places
- Location within Michigan Location within the United States
- Interactive map
- Location: 301 N Harbor Dr., Grand Haven, Michigan
- Coordinates: 43°4′4″N 86°13′48″W
- Area: less than one acre
- Built by: Lima Locomotive Works
- Architectural style: steam locomotive
- NRHP reference No.: 00001490
- Added to NRHP: December 7, 2000

The Pere Marquette 1223 is a N-1 class 2-8-4 "Berkshire" type steam locomotive, built in November 1941 by the Lima Locomotive Works for the Pere Marquette Railway, it is on permanent display in Grand Haven, Michigan. It is one of two surviving Pere Marquette 2-8-4 "Berkshire" type locomotives, along with sibling engine No. 1225, the inspiration for the locomotive in the book and movie versions of The Polar Express, which is in operating condition.

== History ==
No. 1223 was built in November 1941 by the Lima Locomotive Works for $90,000 ($1.97 million in 2025 dollars), 1223 hauled freight and steel between Toledo and Chicago in the years immediately before and after World War II. When the Pere Marquette was absorbed by the Chesapeake and Ohio Railway, the engine assigned number 2657 but never had the new number applied. The locomotive was not paid off at the time and the merger agreement stated that equipment still under trust was to remain in the Pere Marquette livery. It was retired from service in 1951.

After retirement, No. 1223 was moved to New Buffalo, Michigan, to be scrapped. However, it was repainted and moved in 1960 for display at the state fairgrounds in Detroit. The money for that was provided by the donations collected by school children around the Detroit Area. In 1980, Michigan state fair officials wanted to expand the grandstands, but the locomotive stood in the way. The city of Grand Haven won the bidding process. With the help of the Michigan National Guard as well as Grand Trunk Western and Chessie System railroads, No. 1223 was moved to Grand Haven in 1981.

In 1982, the West Michigan Railroad Historical Society acquired the PM steel boxcar #72222 and cosmetically restored it and joined the engine on static display.

The locomotive was added to the National Register of Historic Places on December 7, 2000.

On February 28, 2020, the rest of the display was vandalized, with No. 1223 being spray-painted several times and a caboose door kicked in.
