= CSAR Class C 2-8-4T =

South African steam locomotive

IMR Western Australian 2-8-4T CSAR Class C 2-8-4T
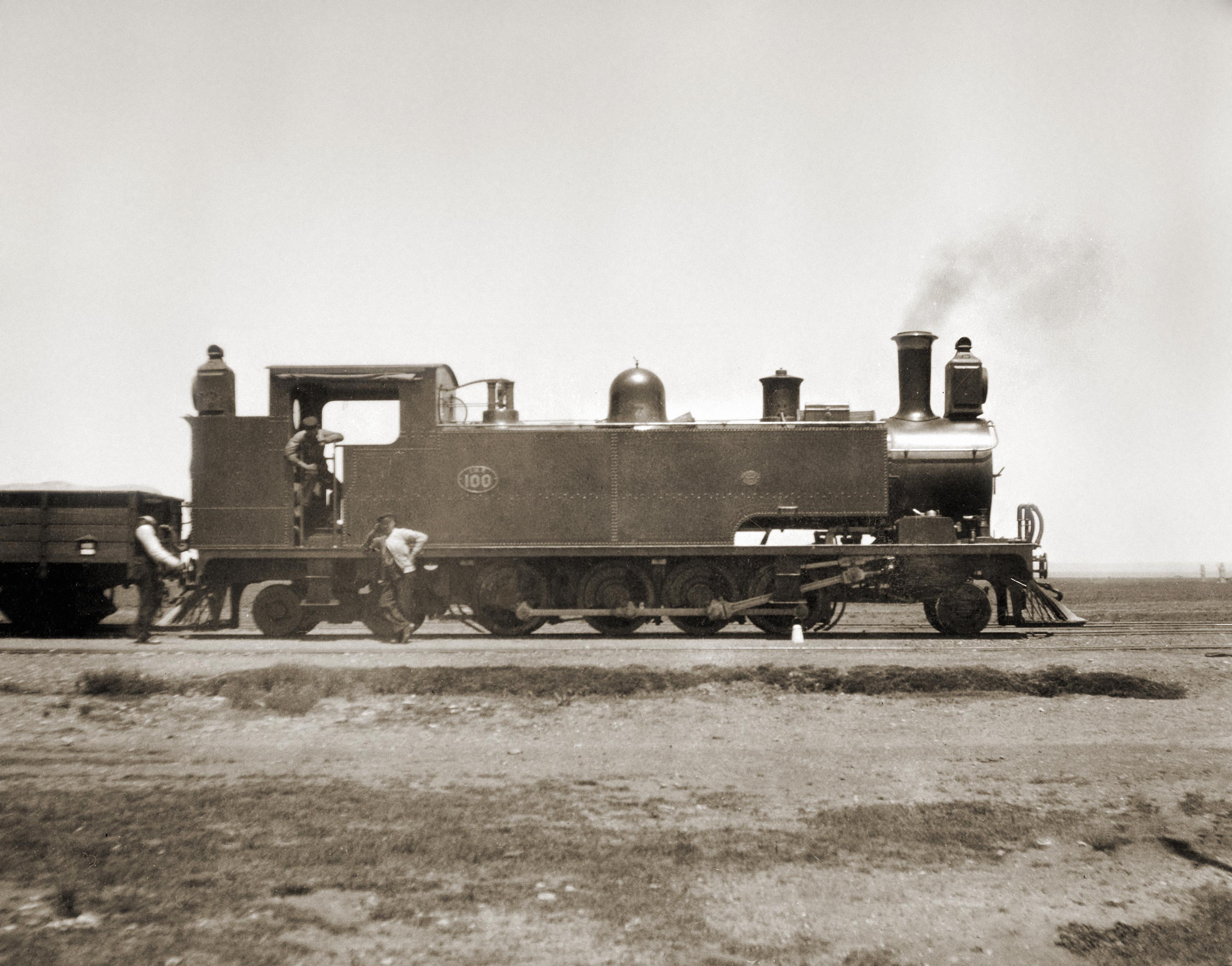
- Western Australian no. 100, November 1901
Type and origin
- Power type: Steam
- Designer: Neilson, Reid & Company
- Builder: Neilson, Reid & Company
- Serial number: 5897-5902
- Build date: 1900
- Total produced: 6
Specifications
- Configuration
  - Whyte: 2-8-4T (Berkshire)
  - UIC: 1′D2′n2t
- Driver: 2nd coupled axle
- Gauge: 3 ft 6 in (1,067 mm) Cape gauge
- Leading dia.: 25 in (635 mm)
- Coupled dia.: 38 in (965 mm)
- Trailing dia.: 25 in (635 mm)
- Wheelbase: 28 ft (8,534 mm)
  - Axle spacing (Asymmetrical): 1-2: 3 ft 5 1/2 in (1,054 mm); 2-3: 3 ft 5 1/2 in (1,054 mm); 3-4: 4 ft 4 in (1,321 mm)
  - Coupled: 11 ft 3 in (3,429 mm)
  - Trailing: 4 ft 6 in (1,372 mm)
- Length
  - Over couplers: 36 ft 1 1/2 in (11,011 mm)
- Height: 12 ft 7 1/2 in (3,848 mm)
- Frame type: Plate
- Axle load: 8 LT 5 cwt (8,382 kg)
  - Leading: 6 LT (6,096 kg)
  - Coupled: 8 LT 5 cwt (8,382 kg)
  - Trailing: 13 LT (13,210 kg)
- Adhesive weight: 33 LT (33,530 kg)
- Loco weight: 53 LT (53,850 kg)
- Fuel type: Coal
- Fuel capacity: 2 LT 7 cwt (2.4 t)
- Water cap.: 2,000 imp gal (9,100 L)
- Firebox
  - Type: Round-top
  - Grate area: 16.7 sq ft (1.55 m^{2})
- Boiler
  - Pitch: 6 ft 7 1/2 in (2,019 mm)
  - Diameter: 4 ft (1,219 mm)
  - Tube plates: 12 ft 1/4 in (3,664 mm)
  - Small tubes: 167: 1 3/4 in (44 mm)
- Boiler pressure: 160 psi (1,103 kPa)
- Safety valve: Ramsbottom
- Heating surface
  - Firebox: 93.3 sq ft (8.67 m^{2})
  - Tubes: 919.5 sq ft (85.42 m^{2})
  - Total surface: 1,012.8 sq ft (94.09 m^{2})
- Cylinders: Two
- Cylinder size: 17 in (432 mm) bore 21 in (533 mm) stroke
- Valve gear: Stephenson
- Valve type: Slide
- Couplers: Johnston link-and-pin
Performance figures
- Tractive effort: 19,102 lbf (84.97 kN) @ 75%
Career
- Operators: Imperial Military Railways; Central South African Railways; Clydesdale Colliery; Ogies Colliery
- Class: CSAR Class C
- Number in class: 6
- Numbers: IMR 100-105, CSAR 203-208
- Official name: Class C
- Nicknames: Western Australian
- Delivered: 1900
- First run: 1900
- Withdrawn: 1912
- The 2nd & 3rd coupled axles had flangeless wheels

The Central South African Railways Class C 2-8-4T of 1900 was a South African steam locomotive from the pre-Union era in Transvaal.

In 1900, during the Second Boer War, the Imperial Military Railways experienced a shortage of locomotives and six 2-8-4T Berkshire type tank locomotives, destined for the Western Australian Government Railways, were diverted to South Africa where they became known as the Western Australians. In 1902, they came onto the roster of the Central South African Railways and were designated Class C.

== The Second Boer War ==
In 1899, when the Second Boer War broke out, the invading British military forces took control of all railways in the colonies of the Cape of Good Hope and Natal. As possession was obtained, this control was extended to the railways of the Oranje-Vrijstaat Gouwerment-Spoorwegen (OVGS) in the Orange Free State and the Nederlandsche-Zuid-Afrikaansche Spoorweg-Maatschappij (NZASM) in the Zuid-Afrikaansche Republiek (ZAR).

On 7 October 1899, Lieutenant-Colonel E.P.C. Girouard KCMG DSO RE, a Canadian serving in the Royal Engineers and, at the time, the President of the Egyptian State Railways, was appointed as Director of Railways for the South African Field Forces.

While Girouard largely left control of the two colonial railways in the hands of their civilian staff, the railways of the two Boer Republics were worked under the title of Imperial Military Railways (IMR), with civilian and military personnel appointed by him.

== Origin and manufacturer ==
The damage which was inflicted on the railways during hostilities and the transportation demands of the British military led to a shortage of locomotives. To alleviate the shortage, a shipment of six new K class tank locomotives with a 2-8-4T Berkshire type wheel arrangement were diverted to the IMR in South Africa. They had been built for the Western Australian Government Railways (WAGR) by Neilson, Reid & Company in 1900.

== Characteristics ==
Their cylinders were inclined and arranged outside the 7/8-inch thick (22-millimetre) plate frames. The steam chests were arranged between the frames and the unbalanced slide valves were actuated by Stephenson valve gear through rocker shafts.

== Service ==
=== Imperial Military Railways ===
The IMR numbered the locomotives in the range from 100 to 105 and, since they were not classified, they became commonly known as the Western Australians.

=== Central South African Railways ===
Peace was declared on 1 June 1902 and, on 1 July 1902, the railways were handed back to civilian authority. The IMR was transformed into the Central South African Railways (CSAR), which took control of all railways in the Transvaal and the Orange Free State. Girouard remained on as Commissioner of Railways and the NZASM went into liquidation.

Mr. P.A. Hyde was appointed as Chief Locomotive Superintendent of the CSAR. One of the first steps to be taken was to classify and renumber all the locomotive stock, with tank locomotives classified alphabetically and tender locomotives numerically. Since the classification was done in increasing order of weight, the Western Australians were designated Class C, after the NZASM 40 Tonner (Class A) and 46 Tonner (Class B). The Western Australians were renumbered in the range from 203 to 208.

The locomotives were not popular with the crews. As a result of their small coupled wheels and short connecting rods, they were found to ride roughly at speed. In addition, the footplate was cramped since the large side tanks, with a water capacity of 2,000 imperial gallons (9,100 litres), protruded into the cab. The CSAR therefore decided to use them as shunting engines until they were either disposed of or scrapped.

By 1912, after the South African Railways (SAR) was established, these locomotives were considered obsolete and were not included in the SAR classification and renumbering list, but recommended for scrapping even though they were still less than twelve years old.

=== Industry ===
Three of the locomotives did survive, however, two having been sold in 1904 to Clydesdale Collieries at Coalbrook in the northern Orange Free State and one to Ogies Colliery near Witbank. At Clydesdale, no. 204 was reboilered in 1939 and its boiler pressure raised from 160 to 180 pounds per square inch (1,100 to 1,200 kilopascals) in the process. It survived at the colliery until 1972.

== Works numbers ==
The CSAR Class C works numbers, renumbering and disposition are listed in the table.

CSAR Class C 2-8-4T
IMR no.	Works no.	CSAR no.	Sold to
100	5897	203	
101	5898	204	Clydesdale
102	5899	205	Ogies
103	5900	206	
104	5901	207	
105	5902	208	Clydesdale

== Illustration ==
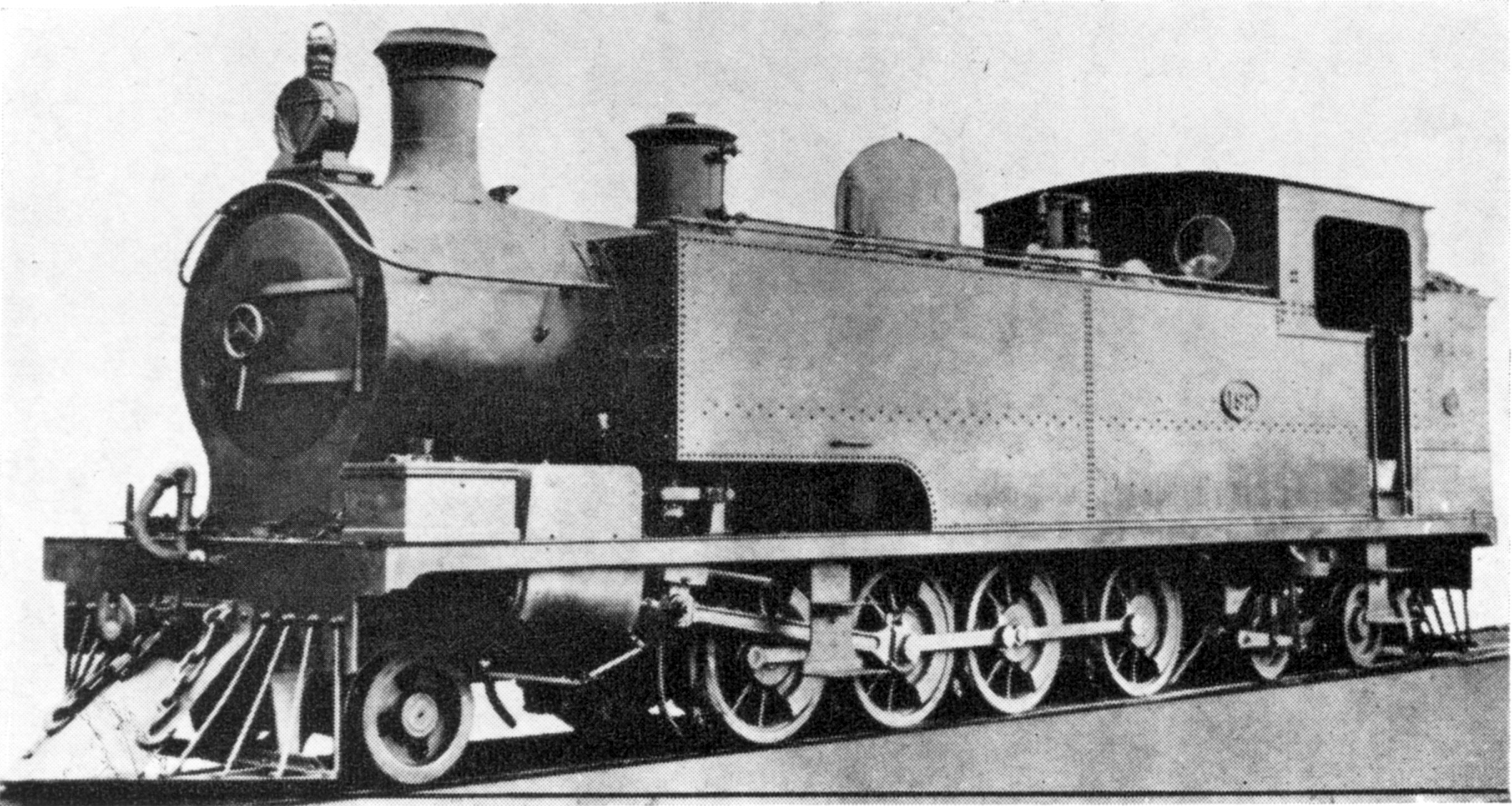
Western Australian, still numbered for the WAGR

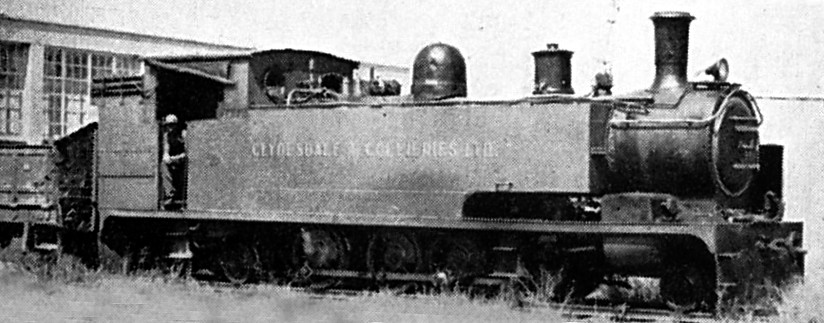
Ex CSAR no. 204 in service at Clydesdale Collieries, c. 1955
