= 2-8-4 =

Locomotive wheel arrangement

2-8-4 (Berkshire/Kanhawa)
- Front of locomotive at left

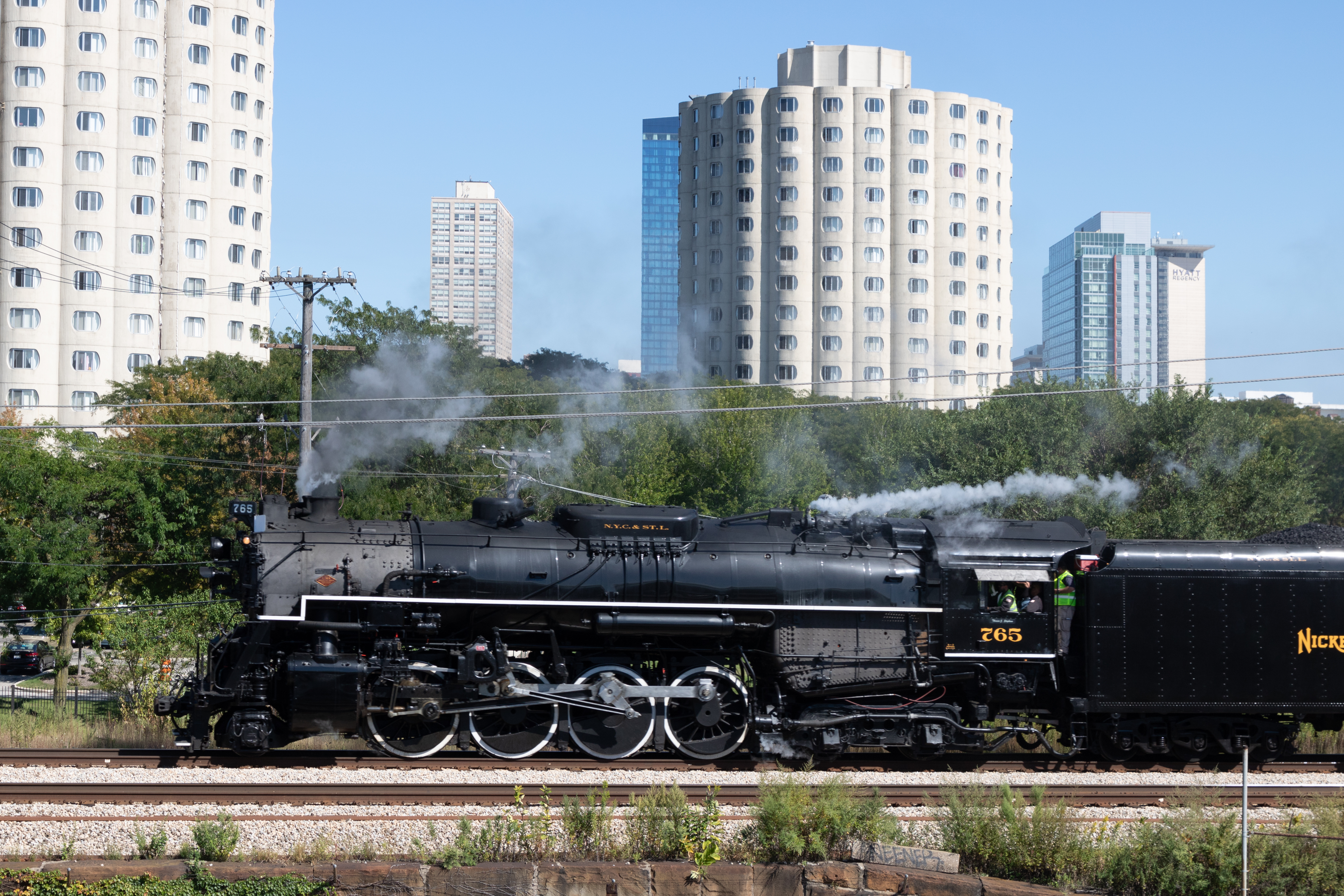
- Nickel Plate Road 765, an American 2-8-4 on an excursion train circa 2018
Equivalent classifications
- UIC class: 1′D2′
- French class: 142
- Turkish class: 47
- Swiss class: 4/7
- Russian class: 1-4-2
First known tank engine version
- First use: 1893
- Country: Australia
- Locomotive: WAGR K class
- Railway: Western Australian Government Railways
- Designer: Neilson and Company
- Builder: Neilson and Company
- Evolved from: 2-8-2T
- Benefits: Larger fireboxes and coal bunkers
First known tender engine version
- First use: 1925
- Country: United States of America
- Locomotive: B&A class A1
- Railway: Boston and Albany Railroad
- Designer: Lima Locomotive Works
- Builder: Lima Locomotive Works
- Evolved from: 2-8-2
- Benefits: Larger firebox and increased speed than 2-8-2

Under the Whyte notation, a 2-8-4 is a steam locomotive that has two unpowered leading wheels, followed by eight coupled and powered driving wheels, and four trailing wheels. This locomotive type is most often referred to as a Berkshire, though the Chesapeake and Ohio Railway used the name Kanawha for their 2-8-4s. In Europe, this wheel arrangement was mostly seen in mainline passenger express locomotives and, in certain countries, in tank locomotives.

== Overview ==
In the United States of America, the 2-8-4 wheel arrangement was a further development of the enormously successful 2-8-2 Mikado. It resulted from the requirement for a freight locomotive with even greater steam heating capacity. To produce more steam, a solution was to increase the size of the locomotive's firebox, though the 2-8-2 wheel arrangement, with its single axle trailing truck, limited the permissible increased axle loading from a larger firebox. The most practical solution was to add a second trailing axle to spread the increased weight of a larger firebox.

The first American 2-8-4s were built for the Boston and Albany Railroad in 1925 by Lima Locomotive Works. The railroad's route across the Berkshire mountains was a substantial test for the new locomotives and, as a result, the name Berkshire was adopted for the locomotive type.

In Europe, 2-8-4 tender locomotives were designed mainly for passenger express trains, but they also hauled long-distance express freights to increase utilisation. European 2-8-4 tank locomotives were a logical transition from the 2-8-2T locomotive types, allowing larger fireboxes and larger coal bunkers. They were mainly used for busy suburban services in heavily populated suburban areas of big cities, but infrequently also for sparsely populated rural areas or long-distance lines.

== Usage ==
=== Australia ===
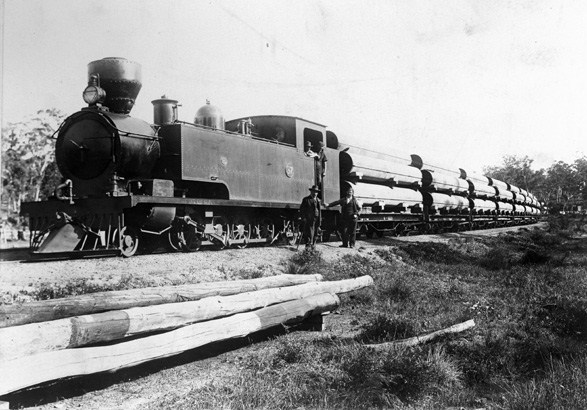
WAGR K class 2-8-4T with pipe train, ca. 1902

The Western Australian K-class was a class of 2-8-4T steam locomotives of the Western Australian Government Railways (WAGR). Between 1893 and 1898, the WAGR took delivery of 24 of these locomotives from Neilson and Company. They entered service on the Eastern Railway between Midland Junction and Northam. In 1900, during the Second Boer War, the Imperial Military Railways experienced a shortage of locomotives and six more new K class locomotives destined for the WAGR were diverted to South Africa, where they were known as the Western Australians.

The South Australian Railways also operated 2-8-4s. Fleet construction commenced in 1930 and by the end of 1943, seventeen locomotives were in service on the 5 ft 3 in (1,600 mm) gauge system. The design of these locomotives was based on American practices. After they were withdrawn from service by 1958, they were all scrapped and did not survive into preservation.

=== Austria ===
The heavy Class 214 1’D2′ (2–8–4) two-cylinder simple expansion express passenger locomotive was developed in Austria in 1927. It was designed by engineers of the Floridsdorf Werke and was the largest Austrian steam locomotive and the most powerful Berkshire type to run in Europe. Designed for the West railway express train service, they were to be used to haul 580-ton express trains from Wien Westbahnhof in Vienna over 317 kilometres (197 miles) to Salzburg. This mainline has three approximately 11.3-kilometre-long (7-mile) banks with gradients between 1 in 91 and 1 in 125.

Two prototypes were built, a two-cylinder and three-cylinder version. When tested, the two-cylinder version proved to be superior to the three-cylinder Class 114 version, and eventually twelve more two-cylinder Class 214 locomotives were built. In 1936, No. 214.13 reached a speed of 156 kilometres per hour (97 miles per hour), the highest speed ever attained by an Austrian steam locomotive. The regular speed limit was 120 kilometres per hour (75 miles per hour).

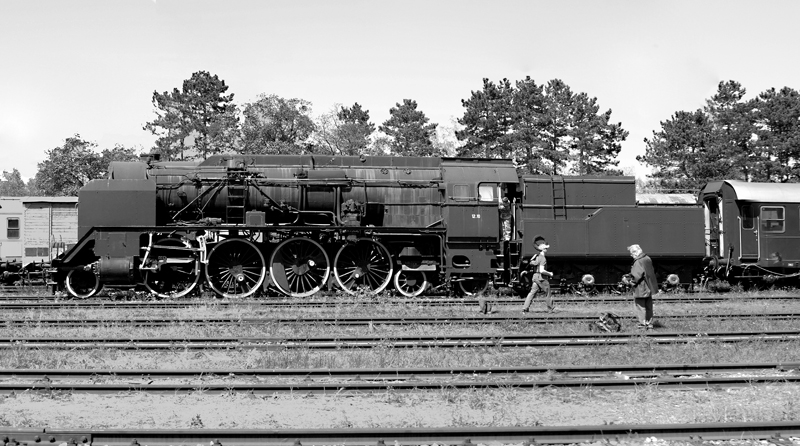
BBÖ Class 114 No. 12.10 at the Eisenbahnmuseum Strasshof, 2007

From 1938, the Deutsche Reichsbahn (DRB) designated the locomotive class 12.0. In the mid-1939, they hauled 600 tons express trains out of Vienna over Wienerwald at a speed of 65 kilometres per hour (40 miles per hour), reaching 120 kilometres per hour (75 miles per hour) over level stretches.

In 1945, seven of these locomotives were taken over by the Soviet Military Administration when they occupied the Russian Zone in Austria. These locomotives had "T" (Trofya) painted before their running numbers and were marked "CCCP". The Russians did not transfer these locomotives out of Austria and, when they withdrew their occupying forces in September 1955, the locomotives were returned to the Austrian Federal Railways (ÖBB).

When the mainline west of Vienna was electrified, all the ÖBB 1’D2’ locomotives were taken out of service and written off. On 15 February 1962, locomotive No. 12.10, built by Floridsdorf in 1936, was preserved as museum locomotive at the Eisenbahnmuseum Strasshof.

=== Brazil ===
Beyer Peacock delivered four 2-8-4T locomotives to Minas & Rio Railway (gauge 1000mm) in 1890, and one more in 1894.

The French state-owned sales consortium Groupement d´Exportation de Locomotives en Sud-Amérique (GELSA) delivered 66 ultra-modern 2-8-4 two-cylinder simple expansion locomotives for the 1,000 mm (3 ft 3 3/8 in) metre gauge Brazilian Railways in 1951 and 1952. They were built by Société Francaise de Construction Mécaniques (Cail), Société des Forges et Ateliers de Creusot (Schneider of Le Creusot) and Compagnie de Fives-Lille. All were delivered to Brazil by the end of 1952.

Designed under the direction of engineer André Chapelon, this class demonstrated that large and powerful steam locomotives could run in general use on light rails of 22 kilograms per metre (44 pounds per yard) with low speed limits. Their maximum axle load had been reduced to 10 tons, all were fitted with double Kylchap exhaust systems and their leading and trailing trucks had Athermos axle boxes. Three tender types could be coupled to them, one heavy and two light, for work in different areas.

- The heavy tender had six-wheel bogies, a coal capacity of 12 tons and a water capacity of 17,800 litres (3,900 imperial gallons; 4,700 US gallons).
- The light coal tender had four-wheel bogies, a coal capacity of 7 tons and a water capacity of 6,900 litres (1,500 imperial gallons; 1,800 US gallons).
- The light wood tender had four-wheel bogies, a firewood capacity of 7 cubic metres (250 cubic feet) and a water capacity of 6,400 litres (1,400 imperial gallons; 1,700 US gallons).

These modern locomotives were regarded with suspicion by some enginemen who were used to obsolete British locomotives which were often over forty years old. In addition, diesel locomotive salesmen claimed that steam traction was obsolete. This attitude spread to middle management staff, with the result that these modern French steam locomotives were replaced in the 1960s, when they were hardly run in. Some of those locomotives which worked in Southern Brazil were leased to the Bolivian Railways in the 1960s. By 2004, some still existed as wrecks in a locomotive dump near Santa Cruz in Bolivia.

=== Bulgaria ===
As part of their modernising and standardisation program, the Bulgarian State Railways (BDZ) ordered twenty superheated three-cylinder 2-8-4T (1’D2’-h3) locomotives from Krupp in 1941. The industrial disruption of the Second World War, however, overloaded the German locomotive builders with domestic production demands and Krupp was only able to produce ten of these new BDZ Class 36 tank locomotives in 1943, works numbers 2272 to 2281.

The new 109.9 ton Class 36 locomotives were intended to replace the older 2-8-0 (1D-h2) locomotives on local passenger train services. The axle loading was kept below 16 tons and their large coal and water capacities made the new class suitable for a wider range of duties, if required. Small smoke deflectors were fitted to the top of the smokebox.

When the new locomotives arrived in Bulgaria in 1943, they were allocated to Sofia depot. Between 1953 and 1957, five locomotives were relocated to Plovdiv depot to serve the Plovdiv-Svilengrad line. In addition to the local passenger train service, duties there also included international express trains to and from Turkey. In 1961, the remaining five locomotives were relocated from Sofia to Varna depot. They remained on these local passenger train duties well into the 1970s, when they were ousted by diesel locomotives and diesel trainsets. Some were preserved.

=== Canada ===
The Toronto, Hamilton and Buffalo Railway (TH&B) was the only Canadian railway to operate 2-8-4 Berkshires. Only two locomotives were ordered from the Montreal Locomotive Works (MLW) in 1927, works numbers 67573 and 67574. They were the last new steam locomotives to be ordered by the TH&B and were allocated road numbers 201 and 202. They were fitted with Coffin feedwater heaters and duplex stokers, and had a working order weight of 128 tons.

After being equipped with Automatic Train Control (ATC) in 1929, they were the only TH&B freight locomotives which were allowed to run on New York Central’s tracks, on the Welland-Buffalo line. Due to dieselisation, both were withdrawn from service in June 1953. Both locomotives 201 and 202 were scrapped in late 1953 and did not survive into preservation.

=== Czechoslovakia ===
==== Tank locomotives ====
The Czechoslovak State Railways (CSD) was one of the largest tank locomotive users in Europe. The dense railway network in Bohemia and Moravia provided the ideal environment for local short-distance passenger train workings powered by numerous classes of tank locomotives. On 31 December 1937, the CSD had no less than 1,250 tank locomotives on its roster, of which 385 were eight-coupled tank locomotives.

The first Czechoslovak 1’D2’t-h2 (2–8–4) tank locomotive was derived from the CSD Class 455.1 1’D-h2 (2–8–0) tender locomotive, with water tanks, a coal bunker and a trailing bogie added. Apart from changing the drive from the second to the third coupled axle and increasing the superheating surface of the boiler, these handsome tank locomotives were mechanically identical to the tender locomotives. They were originally intended to be used on the 167-kilometre-long (104-mile) Prague to České Budějovice (Böhmisch Budweis) line and on branch lines diverting from the mainline for local train service. At the time, however, the 16 ton axle load proved to be too high for most of the lines where they were intended to run and for this reason only 27 locomotives were built between 1928 and 1932.

The first thirteen were initially designated Class 446.0, but an increase in their permitted maximum speed to 80 kilometres per hour (50 miles per hour) led to the locomotive's reclassification to Class 456.0, numbered 456.001 to 027. These were powerful tank locomotives, nicknamed Krasin after the explorer General Nobile who reached the North Pole in 1928. When tested while hauling a 900-ton train, one reached a maximum speed of 90 kilometres per hour (56 miles per hour) at level and an average speed of 32 kilometres per hour (20 miles per hour) while climbing a 1 in 100 gradient.

Between 1938 and 1945, all of them remained on the Böhmisch-Mährisch Bahn (BMB) and Protektorátni Drahy Cech a Moravy (CMD) lines in Bohemia and Moravia, and all 27 survived the Second World War. By the early 1960s, the Class 456.0 locomotives were spread thinly over most of the country, having been allocated to locations from Plzeň in western Bohemia to Banská Bystrica in Slovakia. All were withdrawn from service between 1968 and 1972. One, no. 456.011, went into industrial service and three others, numbers 456.015, 024 and 026, were later used as mobile boilers. The remainder were scrapped.

==== Tender locomotives ====
The CSD ordered three Class 486.1 1’D2’-h3 (2–8–4) locomotives, based on the three-cylinder Class 114 locomotive of the Austrian Federal Railways (BBÖ). This hand-fired locomotive had a Krauss-Helmholtz leading truck and the diameter of its coupled wheels was 1,830 millimetres (72 inches). Its total weight in working order was 107.6 tons, of which 63.9 tons were adhesive weight. All three cylinders were of 550 millimetres (21.65 inches) bore with a 680 millimetres (26.77 inches) stroke. The heating surface of the boiler was 253.2 square metres (2,725.42 square feet), of which 105.6 square metres (1,136.67 square feet) were superheating area. The grate area was 5 square metres (53.82 square feet) and the locomotive was designed for possible coal dust firing. They had Class 926.0 tenders, which were rebuilt from Class 623.0 tenders.

They were not as successful as expected. One of the Class was tested against a Class 486.0 2’D1’-h3 (4-8-2) locomotive on the 248 kilometres (154 miles) hilly mainline between Žilina and Košice on the former Košice-Bohumín Drahy (KBD) line. It proved to be inferior to its opponent in both speed and power.

All three locomotives were allocated to the Brno shed for most of their active service lives. During the years from 1938 to 1945, they were rostered as BMB-CMD locomotive stock. They were withdrawn from service in 1967 and 1968 and were later used as mobile boilers.

=== Germany ===
==== Deutsche Bundesbahn ====
After the Second World War, the recovering West Germany needed economical assistance. This came, in part, in the form of new locomotive orders placed with the West German locomotive industry, which kept it going in the tough and competitive world markets.

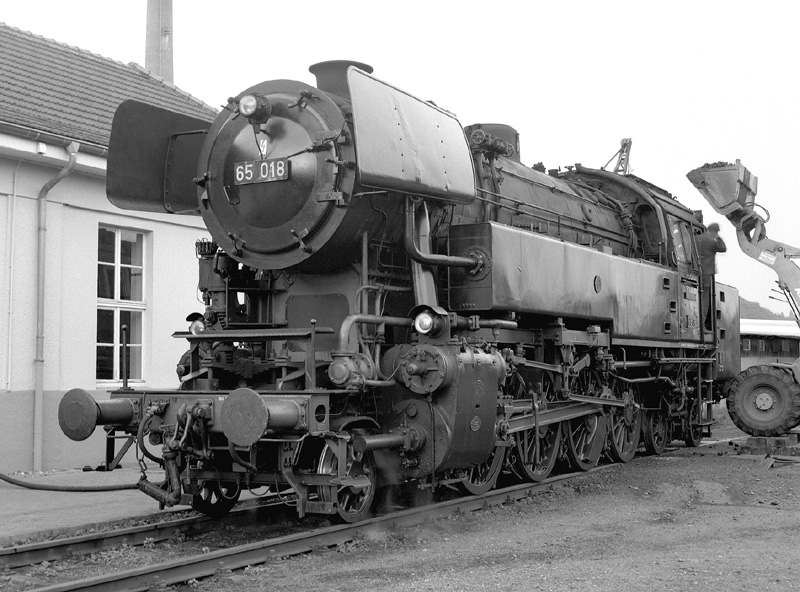
Deutsche Bundesbahn Class 65

A new tank locomotive type was designed by Krauss-Maffei and, in 1951, the firm built thirteen locomotives of a new Deutsche Bundesbahn (DB) Class 65 1’D2’t-h2 (2-8-4T) locomotive. Five more followed in 1955. In test, these locomotives hauled 800 tons on level track, while they managed to reach 50 kilometres per hour (31 miles per hour) hauling 400 tons up a 1 in 100 gradient. All the locomotives had small "Witte" type smoke deflectors. Their maximum speed was 85 kilometres per hour (53 miles per hour), even running bunker first.

These locomotives saw service in local passenger train service around big cities and on branch lines which could bear the 17.5 ton axle load. They were found to be economical in service and served well during the short period they spent in service. In the late 1960s and early 1970s, they were ousted by expanding electrification and by diesel locomotives and diesel motor trainsets.

==== Deutsche Reichsbahn ====
The East German Deutsche Reichsbahn’s 1’D2’t-h2 (2-8-4T) locomotives were derived from the West German Class 65 and became the Class 65.10. They were capable of developing 1,500 indicated horsepower (1,100 kilowatts) and could run at 90 kilometres per hour (56 miles per hour) on level track, hauling 350 tons passenger trains. A total of 88 Class 65.10 locomotives were built between 1954 and 1957. These locomotives had the DR's version of small "Witte" type smoke deflectors.

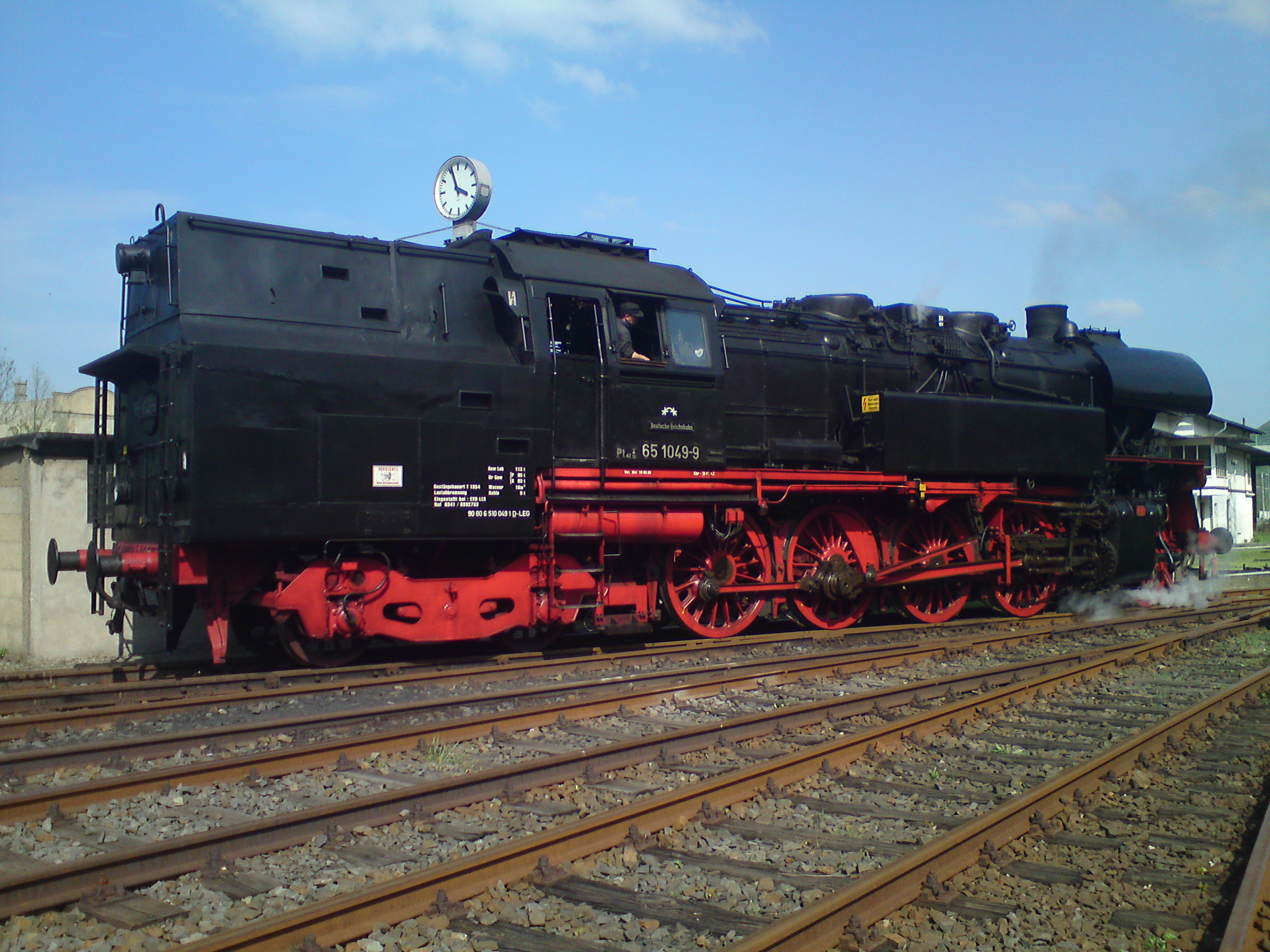
Deutsche Reichsbahn Class 65.10

These were the last new-built 1’D2’t-h2 (2-8-4T) 1,435 mm (4 ft 8 1/2 in) standard gauge locomotives in the world. Their maximum 17.5 ton axle load restricted them to mainline service. They were intended to haul heavy suburban trains around Berlin, Leipzig, Halle and Magdeburg, where they replaced the older Prussian T 12 and Prussian T 18 classes. Many were still in service in the 1970s and some still survived in the early 1980s.

For branch line service, the DR designed a smaller wheeled version of the Class 65.10. This locomotive had only a 15-ton axle load and became the DR Class 83.10. Its maximum speed in both directions was 60 kilometres per hour (37 miles per hour). These locomotives were also fitted with the DR's version of "Witte" smoke deflectors, the only tank locomotive designed for freight service that had them.

In 1955, 27 of these locomotives were built and used for working freight and mixed trains on short branch lines. They also worked on mountainous lines with sharp curves and steep gradients of more than 1.5% (1 in 67) and where 60 kilometres per hour (37 miles per hour) was the maximum speed limit.

=== Japan ===
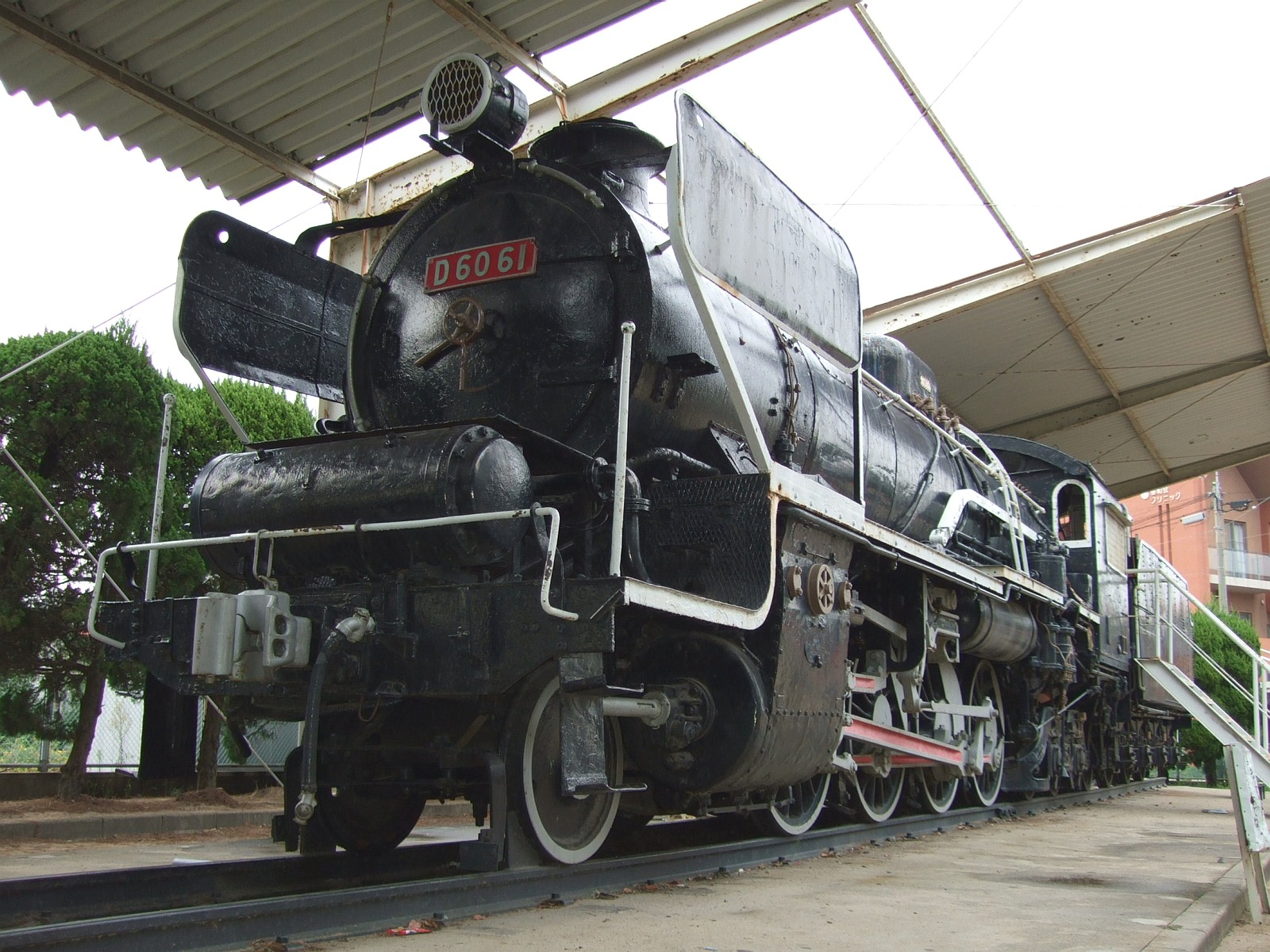
A JNR Class D60 2-8-4 preserved in Ashiya Town, Fukuoka, Japan.

The Japanese National Railways (JNR) closely followed American practice after the Second World War, with Berkshire locomotives used mainly on heavy freight service, such as heavy coal trains. They were the heaviest steam locomotives used on the JNR's 3 ft 6 in (1,067 mm) gauge lines.

The JNR rebuilt a total of 104 locomotives to the 2-8-4 wheel arrangement from its older 2-8-2 Mikado classes, the Class D50, Class D51 and Class D52.

- In 1950 and 1951, twenty Class D62 2-8-4 locomotives were rebuilt from Class D52 at the JNR's Hamamatsu Works.
- Between 1951 and 1956, 78 Class D60 2-8-4 locomotives were rebuilt from Class D50 at the JNR's Hamamatsu, Nagano and Tsuchizaki Works.
- In 1959 and 1960, six Class D61 2-8-4 locomotives were rebuilt from Class D51 at the JNR's Hamamatsu and Kōriyama Works.

Some of these locomotives survived in service up to the end of steam traction on the JNR in 1974.

=== Mexico ===
In 1951, Mexico's Ferrocarriles Nacionales de México (N de M) bought five 2-8-4 locomotives, built by Baldwin Locomotive Works in 1940, from Norfolk Southern Railway in the United States of America (USA), where they had become redundant due to dieselisation. Before their arrival in Mexico, all five went through a complete major overhaul in the USA. They arrived in Mexico late in 1951 and were allocated N de M numbers 3350 to 3354. Remaining in service until the late 1960s, they became the last USA-built Berkshires in the world to remain in revenue-earning common carrier service.

=== New Zealand ===
In 1904, the Wellington and Manawatu Railway Company (WMR) ordered a 2-8-4 tank locomotive from Baldwin Locomotive Works for banking duties on the 2 1/2% (1 in 40) gradients from Wellington to Ngaio. The locomotive, no. 3, was nicknamed Jumbo. When the New Zealand Government purchased the WMR, no. 3 was renumbered to W^{J} class no. 466 by the New Zealand Government Railways. It was the only locomotive in the class.

The locomotive had a tendency for cracking its bar frame on this heavy duty. By 1920, it was waiting to go to the Petone Works with yet another crack in the frame and it did not see much service after that. The solitary 2-8-4T locomotive in New Zealand was written off the books in 1928 and its boiler was sent to the Taumarunui locomotive depot for use as a washout boiler.

=== Norway ===
In the mid-1930s, the Norwegian State Railways (Norges Statsbaner or NSB) ordered altogether eighteen powerful superheated four-cylinder compound 1'D2'-h4v (2–8–4) passenger locomotives for express and passenger train service on its 553-kilometre-long (344-mile) single mainline between Oslo and Trondheim, on the northern section between Otta and Trondheim.

The 210-kilometre-long (130-mile) section of the mainline between Trondheim and Dombås reaches an altitude of 1,041 metres (3,415 feet) over the Dovrefjell, with gradients of 1 in 46 to 1 in 56 and curves of 200 to 300 metres (660 to 980 feet) radius. At the time, the maximum axle load was limited to 15.5 tons. Great skill was displayed in the design of these locomotives, which were built specifically to operate 300 ton trains under these conditions. Weight reduction was a major problem and, as a consequence, the frame was constructed of only 255-millimetre thick (10-inch) plate, but strongly braced, while the platform was of aluminium.

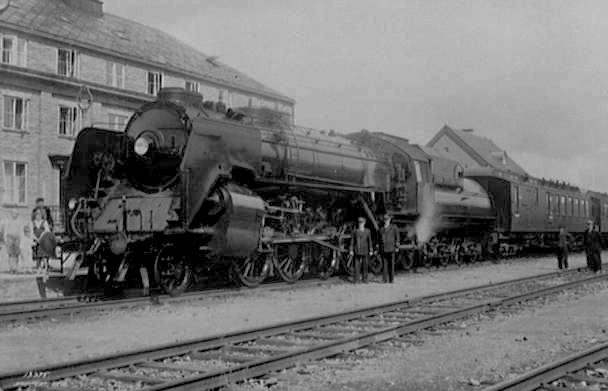
Norges Statsbaner Class 49a Dovregubben, Oppdal station, c. 1935

The planned eighteen NSB Class 49 locomotives never materialised, however, since those under construction at the Krupp Works in Essen, Germany, were damaged so severely by Allied bombing in October 1943 that they were never completed. In addition, Thune's Works at Skøyen in Norway could not carry on with the construction of its share of the order because of a wartime lack of high quality steel and other materials.

Only seven Class 49 locomotives were eventually placed in service. Of these, three were built by Hamar and Thune in 1935 and 1936, two by Krupp in 1940 and two by Thune in 1941. These locomotives, nicknamed Dovregubben (Dovre Giants), were the only true compounds owned by the NSB.

On test, one of them hauled 350 tons at 60 kilometres per hour (37 miles per hour) up a gradient of 1 in 55, developing 2,650 indicated horsepower (1,980 kilowatts). Despite the relatively small 1,530 millimetres (60.24 inches) diameter coupled wheels, a speed of 115 kilometres per hour (71 miles per hour) was reached with the same load on level track. In normal service, their maximum speed was restricted to 80 kilometres per hour (50 miles per hour) on account of the light track in use at the time and they were capable of hauling 280 tons at 60 kilometres per hour (37 miles per hour) up long 1 in 55 gradients.

When compared to other NSB steam locomotives, these engines had a short lifespan and all were written off in 1958, after the arrival of class Di3 diesel locomotives on the Dovre line.

=== Romania ===
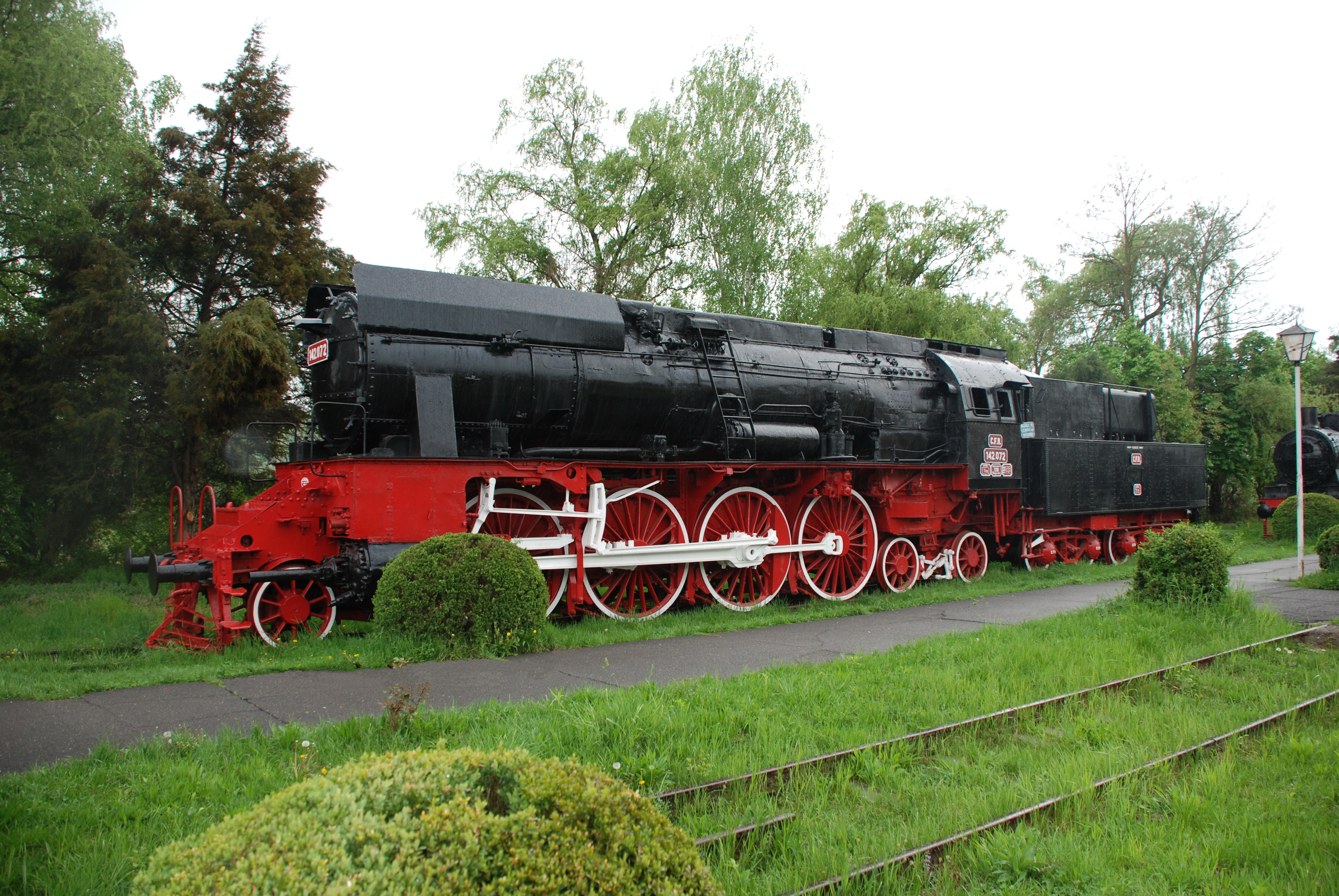
CFR 142.072 at the Reşiţa Museum

When the Romanians looked for a powerful passenger locomotive to serve on the Căile Ferate Române (CFR) mainlines across the Carpathian Mountains, they decided upon the Austrian Federal Railways (BBÖ) Class 214. They purchased the drawings from Austria and 79 locomotives of the same type were built under licence in their modern new Malaxa and Reşiţa Works in Romania. These 2-8-4 locomotives entered service as CFR class 142.000. In 1939, a batch was built with Caprotti instead of Lentz poppet valves, but since some of these were later observed with Lentz valve gear, the Italian gear had presumably been removed.

These locomotives proved to be suitable for Romanian conditions, being of ample dimensions, moderate axle load, straightforward two-cylinder engines of 650 millimetres (25.59 inches) bore with a 720 millimetres (28.35 inches) stroke, and 1,940 millimetres (76.38 inches) diameter coupled wheels. The total weight in working order was 123.5 tons, of which 72.1 tons was adhesive weight.

Nearly all of them were still in service in the late 1960s. The Class 142 locomotives hauled the principal CFR express trains on mainlines and, like their Austrian cousins, were able to render good performance. At least three have been preserved for museums, locomotives no. 142.008, 142.044 and 142.072.

=== South Africa ===
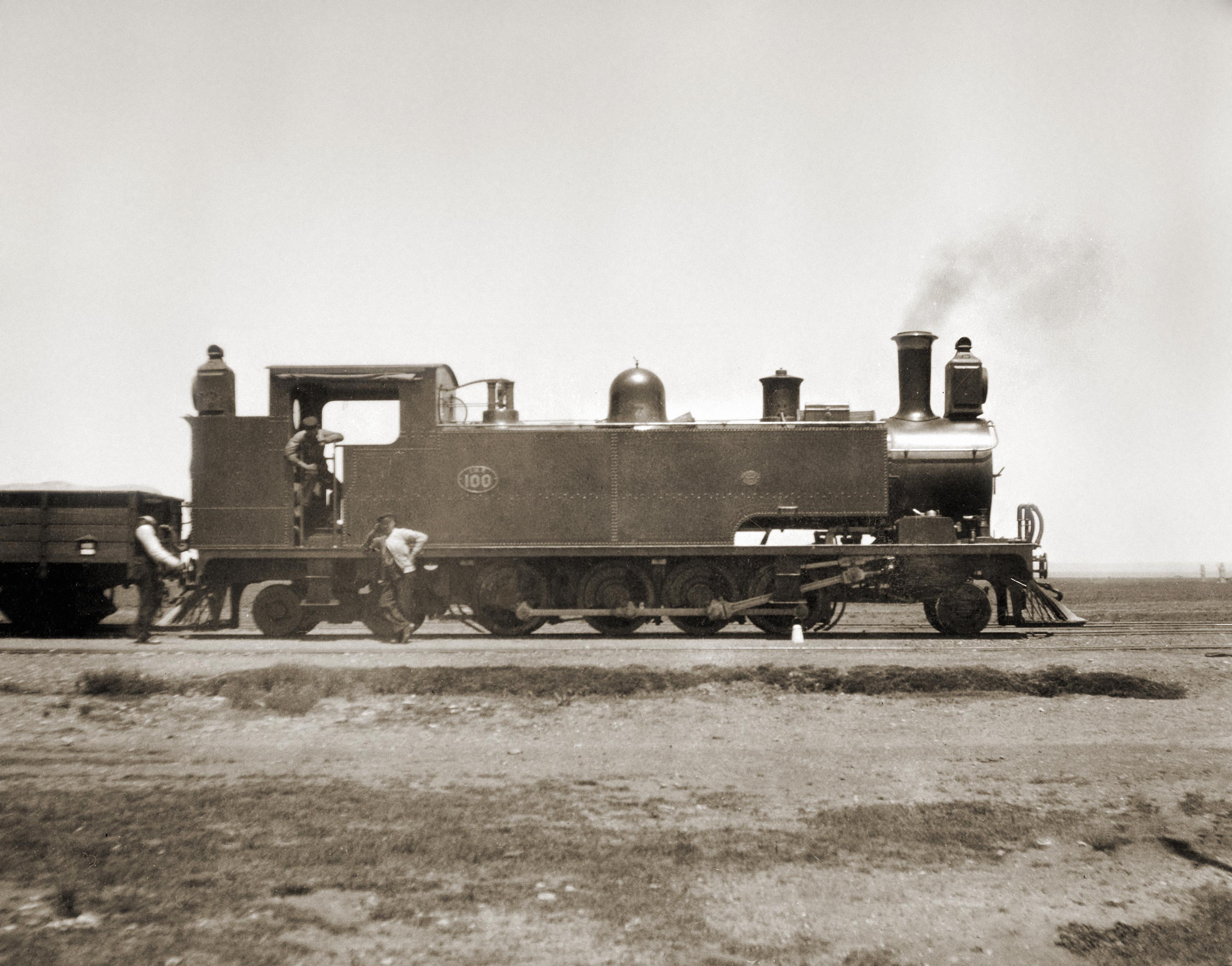
CSAR Class C

In 1900, during the Second Boer War, the Imperial Military Railways experienced a shortage of locomotives and six K class tank locomotives, destined for the Western Australian Government Railways, were diverted to South Africa where they were known as the Western Australians. In 1902, they came onto the roster of the Central South African Railways and were designated CSAR Class C. By 1912, when the renumbering onto the South African Railways (SAR) roster was implemented, these locomotives were considered obsolete and were not included in the SAR classification and renumbering list, but recommended for scrapping even though they were still less than twelve years old.

In 1949 and 1950, the SAR placed 100 Class 24 Berkshires in branch line service, which included the whole of South West Africa (Namibia). They were acquired to replace the ageing fleet of Class 6 and Class 7 locomotives on light 45 pounds per yard (22 kilograms per metre) rail.

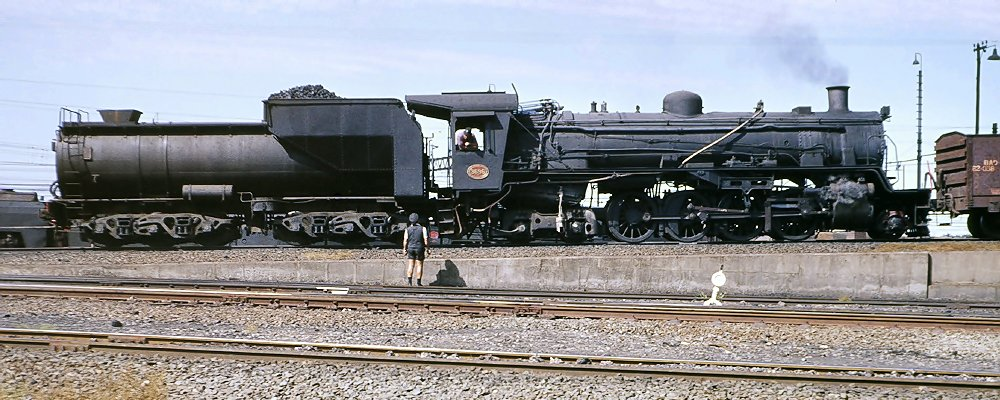
SAR Class 24, 1983

The locomotive was designed by Dr. M.M. Loubser, Chief Mechanical Engineer of the SAR from 1939 to 1949. It had a one-piece steel main frame that was cast integrally with the cylinders, including the cylinder hind covers, smokebox support frame, stays and various brackets, all of which would normally be separate items riveted or bolted onto the frame. Advantages of this arrangement were reduced maintenance and less time spent in shops. It was the first South African steam locomotive to be built using this technique. They were built with Watson Standard no. 1 boilers and they used Type MY Torpedo tenders that ran on three-axle Buckeye bogies.

It was the only Berkshire type to see service on the SAR. Most of them went to South West Africa, where 55 of them would remain in operation until strengthening of the track and the introduction of diesel traction made them available to be employed elsewhere. They were withdrawn in the mid-1980s. Several have been preserved in running order for service on excursion trains, operated by private steam enthusiast groups in Cape Town and in Gauteng.

=== Soviet Union ===
From the mid-1930s until their replacement by diesel locomotives, the 2-8-4 (1’D2’-h2) wheel arrangement was relatively common in the former Soviet Union. When built, these locomotives were designated Class IS, for Josif Stalin. The Class IS locomotive was a passenger derivative of the Class FD 1’E1’-h2 (2-10-2) freight locomotive and had many parts in common with the Class FD.

The Soviet 2-8-4 was the most numerous single Berkshire class built in the world. Kolomna Locomotive Works built the first four locomotives. In 1935, production was transferred to the enlarged and modernised former Luhansk Works which was renamed Voroshilovgrad Locomotive Works. A total of 649 locomotives of the two variants, Class IS20 and Class IS21 (later Class FDp), were built between 1932 and 1942. After Germany attacked the Soviet Union on 22 June 1941, the Russians evacuated all semi-completed class IS21 locomotives from Voroshilovgrad. The Ulan-Ude Locomotive Works completed the last eleven in 1941 and 1942.

Despite their moderate size compared to American and Canadian-built 2-8-4s, the Soviet 2-8-4 was a good example of a Berkshire type designed for heavy express and passenger train service. It had a 7.04 square metres (75.78 square feet) grate, 15 kilograms per square centimetre (213 pounds per square inch) boiler pressure, 295.2 square metres (3,178 square feet) boiler heating surface of which 148.4 square metres (1,597 square feet) was superheated, and only 20 to 21 tons maximum axle load. Their 1,850 millimetres (72.83 inches) diameter coupled wheels and cylinders of 670 millimetres (26.38 inches) bore and 770 millimetres (30.31 inches) stroke, with a total weight of 133 tonnes of which 80.7 tonnes were adhesive weight, enabled the locomotives to easily reach the maximum permitted speed of 120 kilometres per hour (75 miles per hour) with 700 to 800 tons behind the tender. The usual maximum speed was about 100 kilometres per hour (62 miles per hour), with an occasional need of 115 kilometres per hour (71 miles per hour).

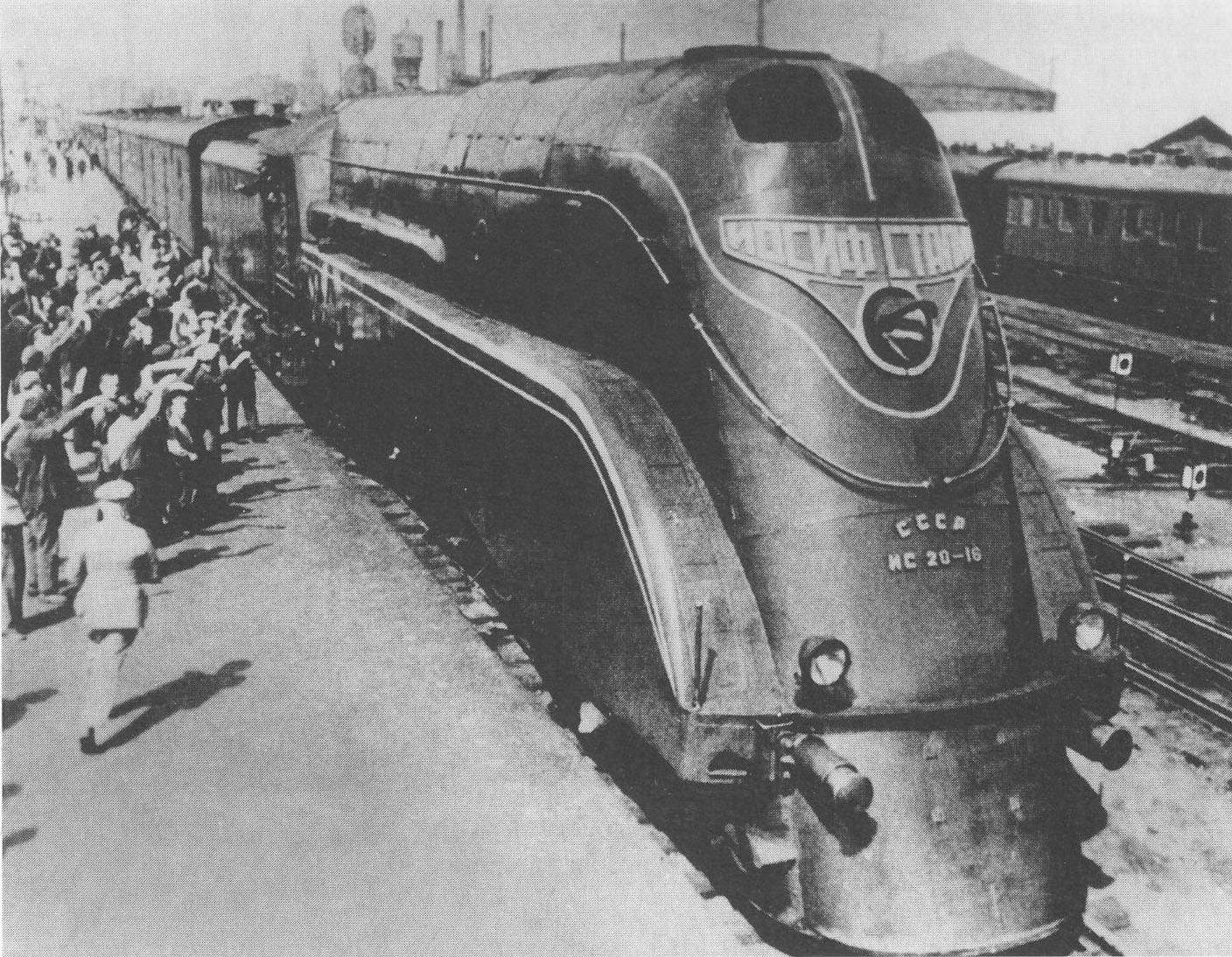
Soviet Class IS with streamline casing at the Voroshilovgrad factory

They were used as express passenger locomotives on mainlines which had type Ia rails of 43.5 kilograms per metre (88 pounds per yard). They were later reclassified as Class FDp (FD passenger). One locomotive, no. IS20-16, was streamlined and achieved a speed of 155 kilometres per hour (96 miles per hour) during test runs in 1937. Another, no. IS20-241, was displayed at the Paris World Exhibition in 1937, where it demonstrated the Soviet Union's locomotive production.

The first four were initially allocated to the October Railway and ran between Moscow and Leningrad, hauling heavy night passenger trains. Later, when the line was upgraded with heavier rails, they were transferred to the Moscow-Kursk-Kharkov-Sinelnikovo line. When more class IS locomotives began to roll out from the Voroshilovgrad production lines, they were used on the upgraded Moscow-Smolensk-Minsk, Moscow to Valuiki and Mitchurinsk to Rostov-on-Don mainlines.

Only one such locomotive was preserved, no. IS21-578, plinthed outside the main railway station in Kyiv in Ukraine.

=== United States ===
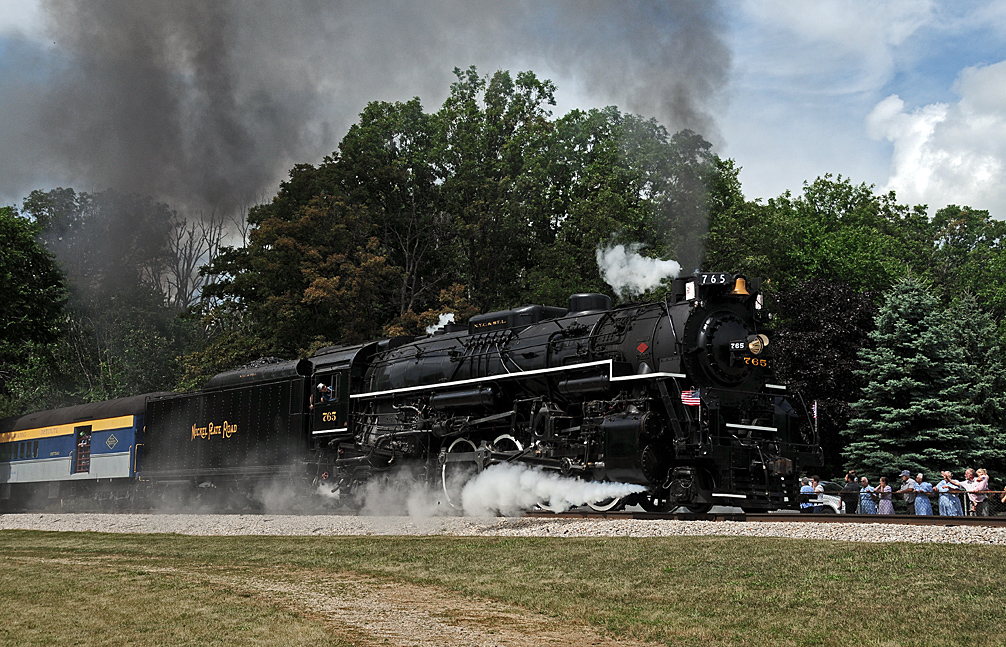
The Nickel Plate 765 is one of two remaining operating Berkshire steam locomotives

Locomotives of a 2-8-4 wheel arrangement were used mainly for hauling fast, heavy freight trains on large Class I railroads, most notably the Nickel Plate Road and the Chesapeake & Ohio. While some were ordered to replace older freight locomotives like 2-8-2 Mikados or 2-10-2s where more power and speed was required, later examples were constructed for new fast freight trains, with schedules too fast for older designs.

Six years after the Atchison, Topeka and Santa Fe Railway experimented with the first 2-10-4, the first 2-8-4 was built by Lima Locomotive Works for the Boston and Albany Railroad (B&A) in 1925. The railroad's route over the Berkshires in western Massachusetts was one of the only significant grades on the New York Central system, and was thus the ideal field test environment for the new design. Lima had previously designed a "super 2-8-2" for the NYC, but increasing train length and speed demanded increased steam capacity, so an additional axle was added to the trailing truck and the first 2-8-4 in the U.S., Lima A-1 class number 1, was born. This approach to locomotive design was termed "Super-Power" by Lima, a moniker that was subsequently applied to locomotives of similar designs made by other companies (e.g. ALCO and Baldwin).

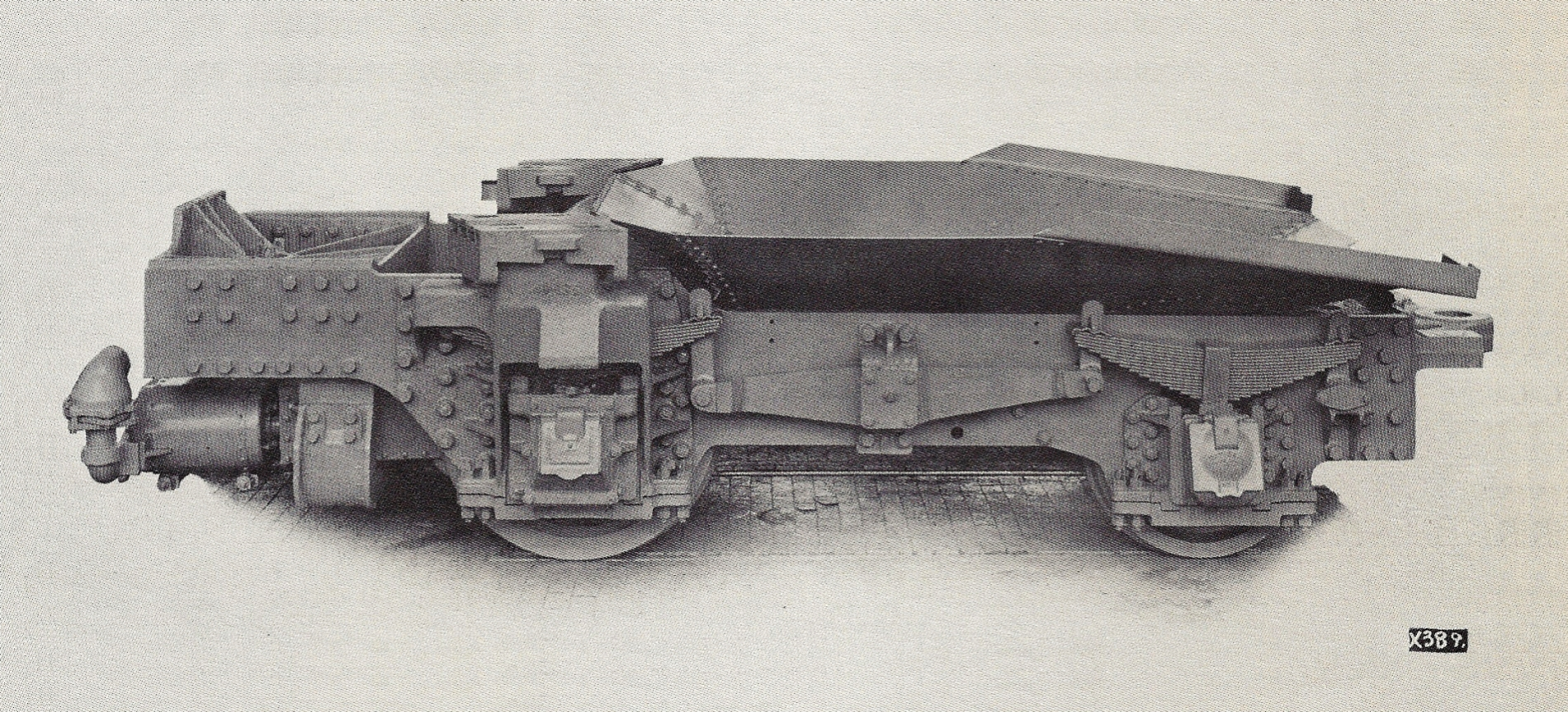
The trailing truck of the Lima A-1.

The A-1 featured 63-inch (1,600 mm) driving wheels, a working boiler pressure of 240 psi (1,700 kPa), and produced over 76,000 lbf (340 kN) of tractive effort from 28-by-30-inch (710 mm × 760 mm) cylinders. While not suited to fast freight, the A-1 proved a dramatic improvement over the existing locomotives on the line, hauling a heavier train over the mountain more than an hour faster than a nearly-new 2–8–2. Impressed by the new design, the B&A quickly ordered 45 identical locomotives from Lima, choosing to name the type after the mountains they were designed against. Though the Chesapeake and Ohio Railway called their 2-8-4s by the name Kanawha, the name Berkshire became synonymous with the 2-8-4 wheel arrangement, and was used by almost every railroad that rostered them.

Lima soon received orders from other railroads, and by 1930 they had built over 200 examples for five different railroads. ALCO and Baldwin were soon producing examples as well, with almost 300 2-8-4s built by 1930.

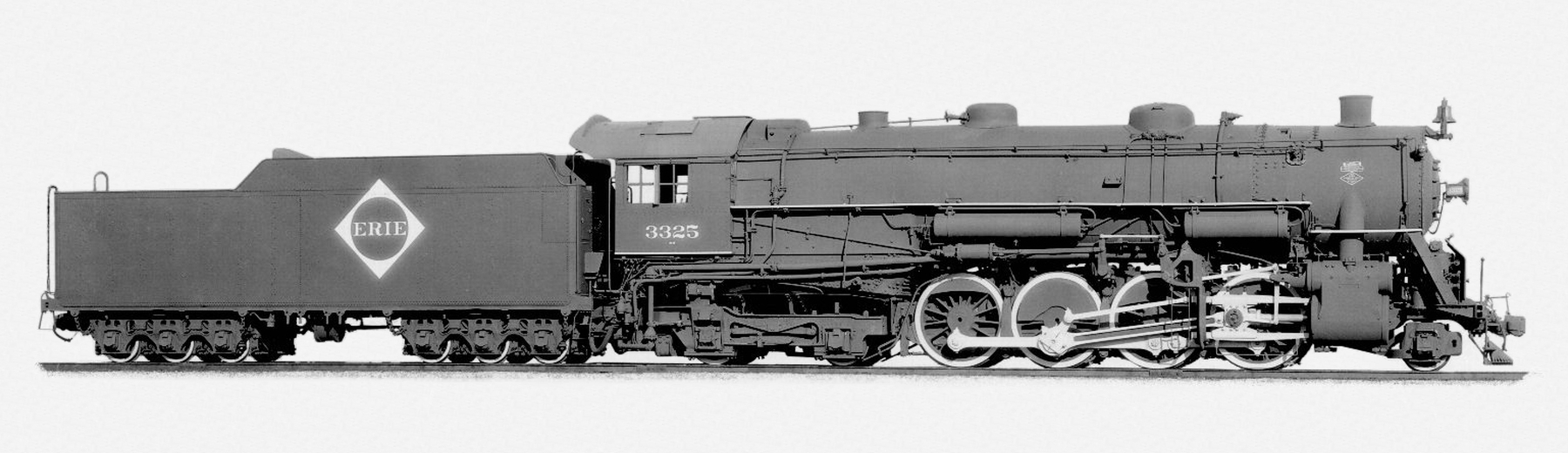
Lima builder's photo of an Erie 2-8-4 locomotive at their plant, ca. 1927

The next development of the Berkshire type came in 1927, when the Erie Railroad ordered 25 engines from ALCO. In contrast to the A-1, these had 70-inch (1,780 mm) drivers and 28.5-by-32-inch (720 mm × 810 mm) cylinders, allowing for much higher speeds and transforming the Erie's freight business, which had previously followed the "drag freight" model of low speeds and high tonnage. A total of 105 similar locomotives from all 3 major builders would eventually form the backbone of the Erie's freight fleet, the largest fleet of 2-8-4s in the US, and would serve until the railroad dieselized in the 1950s.

The Berkshire's final development came in 1934, when the New York, Chicago and St. Louis Railroad (Nickel Plate Road or NKP) received its first 2-8-4s, built to a new design from the Advisory Mechanical Committee (AMC) of the Van Sweringen empire. Under the Van Sweringen umbrella were the Nickel Plate Road, Erie Railroad, Chesapeake and Ohio Railway and Pere Marquette Railway. The AMC's design, based on the C&O's T-1 2-10-4s – themselves based on the Erie's 2-8-4s – generated 64,100 pounds-force (285 kN) of tractive effort with 69-inch (1,750 mm) drivers and became the basis for many subsequent Berkshire designs. The NKP eventually received 80 of the type; 32 copies were built for the Wheeling & Lake Erie, and the Richmond, Fredricksburg, and Potomac received 10 engines built to the same design during World War 2. The Pere Marquette's fleet of 39 Berkshires was built to a slightly different design, with marginally larger cylinders and increased weight, which formed the basis for C&O's fleet of 90 "Kanawhas" as well as 5 engines built for the Virginian Railway. The final Berkshire design was that of the Louisville & Nashville, whose fleet of 42 locomotives is considered by many to be an evolution of the Van Sweringen design.

The last American 2-8-4 built was also the last steam locomotive built by Lima, Nickel Plate 779, in 1949. Coincidentally, ALCO's last steam locomotives were also Berkshire types, built in 1948 for the Pittsburgh and Lake Erie Railroad; towards the end of their short service lives they were transferred to the P&LE's parent company, the New York Central Railroad. Over 600 2-8-4s were built for American service, constituting 2% of the steam fleet prior to dieselization and delivering 5% of the nation's freight ton-miles.

Ultimately rostering 112 locomotives (through its own purchases, and the acquisition of nearly identical locomotives with its purchase of the Wheeling & Lake Erie), the Nickel Plate Road became indelibly associated with the Berkshire type. One of this class, Nickel Plate Road no. 765, was restored to operation and regularly operates excursion trains from its home in New Haven, Indiana. 5 other NKP Berkshires are preserved around the US, including 779 at Lincoln Park in Lima, Ohio.

Another 2–8–4, Pere Marquette 1225, has also been restored to operating condition, and runs regular excursions with the Steam Railroading Institute in Owosso, Michigan. As of April 2024, C&O 2716 was undergoing restoration by the Kentucky Railway Museum. C&O 2755, along with 10 other C&O Kanawha types and Pere Marquette 1223, are preserved on static display around the US. No other 2-8-4s survive, including Lima's groundbreaking A-1.

Many American Class I railroads rostered sizeable fleets of Berkshires. The table lists data on the American locomotives as they were built.

American 2-8-4 construction roster
| Railroad (quantity) | Class | Quantity | Road numbers | Builder | Build year | Notes |
|---|---|---|---|---|---|---|
| Lima Locomotive Works (1) | A1 | 1 | 1 | Lima | 1925 | to IC 7050; Scrapped 1956 |
| Boston and Albany Railroad (55) | A-1a | 25 | 1400–1424 | Lima | 1926 | scrapped 1949-1957 |
| Boston and Albany Railroad (55) | A-1b | 20 | 1425–1444 | Lima | 1926 | Scrapped 1949-1957 |
| Boston and Albany Railroad (55) | A-1c | 10 | 1445–1454 | Lima | 1930 | Scrapped 1949-1957 |
| Illinois Central Railroad (50) | 7000 | 50 | 7000–7049 | Lima | 1926 | 7038 rebuilt in 1937 to 4-6-4; Scrapped 1949-1956 |
| Erie Railroad (105) | S-1 | 25 | 3300–3324 | Alco | 1927 | Scrapped 1950-1952 |
| Erie Railroad (105) | S-2 | 25 | 3325–3349 | Lima | 1927 | Scrapped 1950-1952 |
| Erie Railroad (105) | S-3 | 35 | 3350–3384 | Baldwin | 1928 | Scrapped 1950-1952 |
| Erie Railroad (105) | S-4 | 20 | 3385–3404 | Lima | 1929 | Scrapped 1950-1952 |
| Atchison, Topeka and Santa Fe Railway (15) | 4101 | 15 | 4101–4115 | Baldwin | 1927 | All scrapped |
| Chicago and North Western Railway (12) | J-4 | 12 | 2801–2812 | Alco-Dunkirk | 1927 | All scrapped |
| Toronto, Hamilton and Buffalo Railway (2) | As | 2 | 201–202 | Montreal | 1928 | Only 2-8-4s made for a Canadian railway; all scrapped |
| Boston and Maine Railroad (25) | T-1 | 20 | 4000–4019 | Lima | 1928 | 7 to ATSF, 10 to SP in 1945; All scrapped |
| Boston and Maine Railroad (25) | T-1 | 5 | 4020–4024 | Lima | 1929 | 7 to ATSF, 10 to SP in 1945; All scrapped |
| International – Great Northern Railroad (5) | BK-63 | 5 | 1121–1125 | Alco | 1928 | All scrapped |
| Missouri Pacific Railroad (25) | BK-63 | 25 | 1901–1925 | Lima | 1929 | Rebuilt to 4-8-4s; All scrapped |
| Nickel Plate Road (80) | S | 15 | 700–714 | Alco | 1934 | All scrapped |
| Nickel Plate Road (80) | S-1 | 15 | 715–729 | Lima | 1942 | All scrapped |
| Nickel Plate Road (80) | S-1 | 10 | 730–739 | Lima | 1943 | All scrapped |
| Nickel Plate Road (80) | S-2 | 30 | 740–769 | Lima | 1944 | Five preserved: 755 displayed at Conneaut Railroad Museum in Conneaut, Ohio; 757 displayed at Mad River & NKP Railroad Museum in Bellevue, Ohio; 759 displayed at Steamtown National Historic Site in Scranton, Pennsylvania; 763 displayed at Age of Steam Roundhouse in Sugarcreek, Ohio; 765 in operation at the Fort Wayne Railroad Historical Society in Fort Wayne, Indiana; Remainder scrapped |
| Nickel Plate Road (80) | S-3 | 10 | 770–779 | Lima | 1949 | One Preserved: 779 displayed at Lincoln Park in Lima, Ohio. Remainder scrapped. |
| Detroit, Toledo and Ironton Railroad (6) | 700 | 4 | 700–703 | Lima | 1935 | All scrapped |
| Detroit, Toledo and Ironton Railroad (6) | 700 | 2 | 704–705 | Lima | 1939 | All scrapped |
| Pere Marquette Railway (39) | N | 15 | 1201–1215 | Lima | 1937 | Two class N-1 preserved while other remaining class N series were scrapped; 1223 displayed in Chinook Pier in Grand Haven, Michigan, 1225 in operational condition by the Steam Railroading Institute in Owosso, Michigan and one of the two operating 2-8-4 Berkshires in the United States, along with other Lima built Berk "NKP 765". |
| Pere Marquette Railway (39) | N-1 | 12 | 1216–1227 | Lima | 1941 | Two class N-1 preserved while other remaining class N series were scrapped; 1223 displayed in Chinook Pier in Grand Haven, Michigan, 1225 in operational condition by the Steam Railroading Institute in Owosso, Michigan and one of the two operating 2-8-4 Berkshires in the United States, along with other Lima built Berk "NKP 765". |
| Pere Marquette Railway (39) | N-2 | 12 | 1228–1239 | Lima | 1944 | Two class N-1 preserved while other remaining class N series were scrapped; 1223 displayed in Chinook Pier in Grand Haven, Michigan, 1225 in operational condition by the Steam Railroading Institute in Owosso, Michigan and one of the two operating 2-8-4 Berkshires in the United States, along with other Lima built Berk "NKP 765". |
| Wheeling and Lake Erie Railway (32) | K-1 | 10 | 6401–6410 | Alco | 1937 | All to Nickel Plate Road class S-4 in 1949; All scrapped |
| Wheeling and Lake Erie Railway (32) | K-1 | 2 | 6411–6412 | Alco | 1938 | All to Nickel Plate Road class S-4 in 1949; All scrapped |
| Wheeling and Lake Erie Railway (32) | K-1 | 3 | 6413-6415 | Alco | 1939 | All to Nickel Plate Road class S-4 in 1949; All scrapped |
| Wheeling and Lake Erie Railway (32) | K-1 | 7 | 6416–6422 | Alco | 1942 | All to Nickel Plate Road class S-4 in 1949; All scrapped |
| Wheeling and Lake Erie Railway (32) | K-1 | 10 | 6423–6432 | Alco | 1943 | All to Nickel Plate Road class S-4 in 1949; All scrapped |
| Norfolk Southern Railway (5) | F-1 | 5 | 600–604 | Baldwin | 1940 | to the NdeM in 1950, numbers 3350-3354; All scrapped |
| Louisville and Nashville Railroad (42) | M-1 | 14 | 1950–1963 | Baldwin | 1942 | All scrapped |
| Louisville and Nashville Railroad (42) | M-1 | 6 | 1964–1969 | Baldwin | 1944 | All scrapped, 1966's tender is at the Southeastern Railway Museum |
| Louisville and Nashville Railroad (42) | M-1 | 22 | 1970–1991 | Lima | 1949 | All scrapped, 1984's tender is at the Kentucky Railway Museum |
| Richmond, Fredericksburg and Potomac Railroad (10) | 571 | 10 | 571–580 | Lima | 1943 | All scrapped |
| Chesapeake and Ohio Railway (90) | K-4 | 14 | 2700–2713 | Alco | 1943 | Three Preserved: 2700 displayed at Dennison Railroad Depot Museum in Dennison, Ohio; 2705 displayed at B&O Railroad Museum in Baltimore, Maryland; 2707 displayed at Illinois Railway Museum in Union, Illinois; Remainder scrapped |
| Chesapeake and Ohio Railway (90) | K-4 | 26 | 2714-2739 | Alco | 1944 | Four Preserved: 2716 last K-4 in operation, under restoration at Kentucky Railway Museum; 2727 displayed at National Museum of Transportation in St. Louis, Missouri; 2732 displayed at Science Museum of Virginia in Richmond, Virginia; 2736 displayed at National Railroad Museum in Green Bay, Wisconsin; Remainder scrapped |
| Chesapeake and Ohio Railway (90) | K-4 | 10 | 2740–2749 | Lima | 1945 | All Scrapped |
| Chesapeake and Ohio Railway (90) | K-4 | 10 | 2750–2759 | Lima | 1947 | Two Preserved: 2755 displayed at Chief Logan State Park in Logan, West Virginia, 2756 displayed at Huntington Park in Newport News in Huntington, West Virginia; Remainder scrapped |
| Chesapeake and Ohio Railway (90) | K-4 | 30 | 2760–2789 | Alco | 1947 | Three Preserved: 2760 displayed at Riverfront Park in Lynchburg, Virginia; 2776 displayed at Eyman Park in Washington Court House (Area), Ohio; 2789 last K-4 built displayed at Hoosier Valley Railroad Museum in North Judson, Indiana; Remainder scrapped |
| Virginian Railway (5) | BA | 5 | 505–509 | Lima | 1946 | All scrapped; identical to C&O K-4 class |
| Pittsburgh and Lake Erie Railroad (7) | A-2a | 7 | 9400–9406 | Alco | 1948 | Tenders built by Lima; All scrapped |

== Berkshires in fiction ==
In the motion picture The Polar Express, the "know-it-all" boy identifies the train's locomotive as "a Baldwin 2-8-4 S-3 class" built in 1931, although the actual prototype for the film's locomotive was the Pere Marquette 1225, an N-1 class Berkshire built by the Lima Locomotive Works in 1941.

In the Transformers television series, motion picture and toy line, the Decepticon triple changer Astrotrain is modeled on a JNR Class D62 2-8-4 locomotive, which were ultimately scrapped in 1966 with none surviving to this day.

Locomon in the motion picture Digimon: Runaway Locomon is a 2-8-4 type locomotive.
