= Soviet locomotive class IS =

Type of steam locomotive

Soviet locomotive class ИС
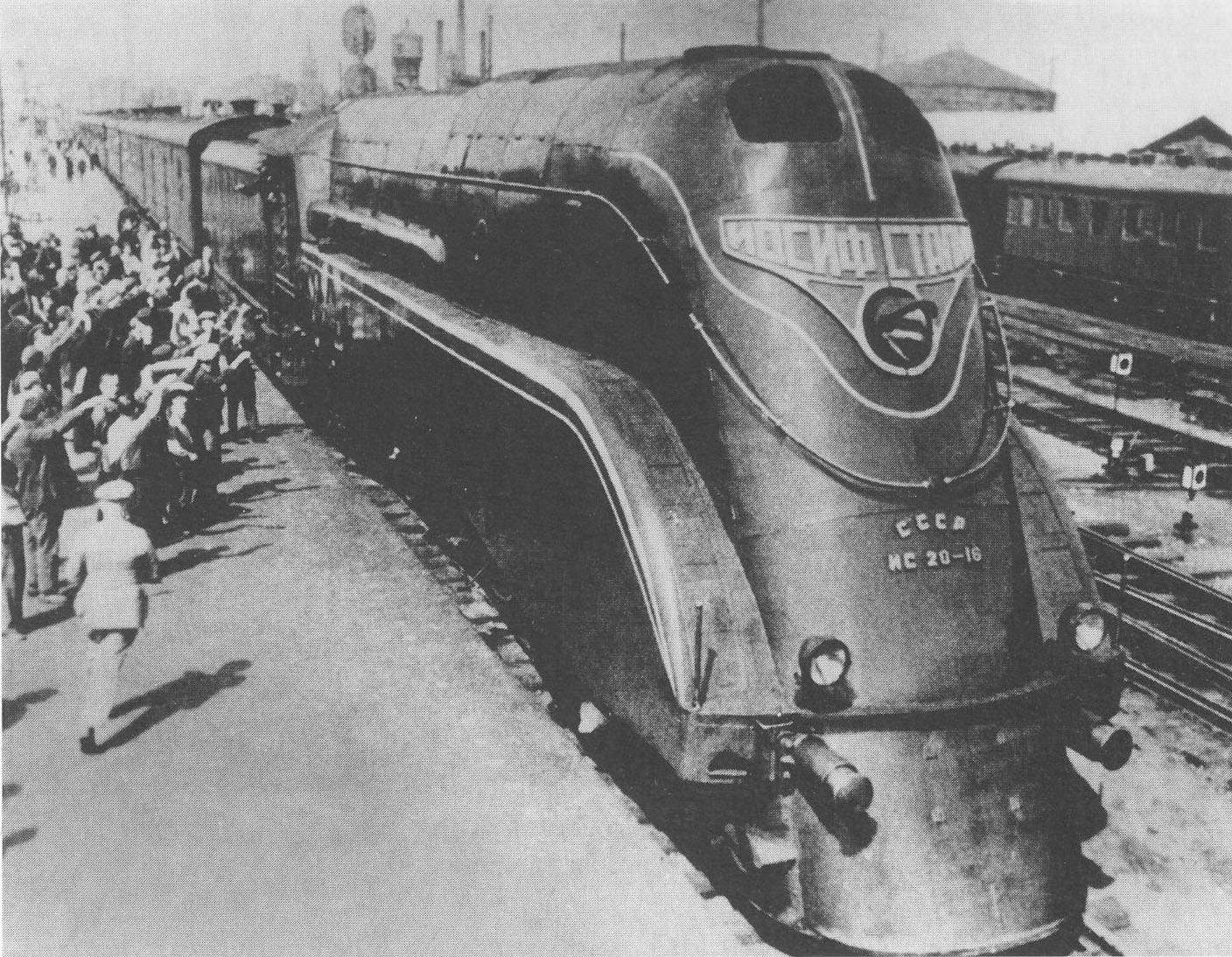
- Steam locomotive IS20-16 with streamline casing at the locomotive factory in Voroshilovgrad in 1937. It was the Soviet steam locomotive-champion with maximum speed of 155 km/h (96 mph).
Type and origin
- Power type: Steam
- Builder: October Revolution Locomotive Factory, Voroshilovgrad (Luhansk)
- Build date: 1932–1942
- Total produced: 649
Specifications
- Configuration
  - Whyte: 2-8-4
  - UIC: 1'D2 h2
- Gauge: 1,524 mm (5 ft)
- Leading dia.: 1,050 mm (41.34 in)
- Driver dia.: 1,850 mm (72.83 in)
- Trailing dia.: 1,050 mm (41.34 in)
- Adhesive weight: 88 tonnes (87 long tons; 97 short tons)
- Loco weight: 133 tonnes (131 long tons; 147 short tons)
- Firebox
  - Grate area: 7.04 m^{2} (75.8 sq ft)
- Boiler pressure: 15 kgf/cm^{2} (1.47 MPa; 213 psi)
- Heating surface: 295.2 m^{2} (3,178 sq ft)
- Superheater
  - Heating area: 148.4 m^{2} (1,597 sq ft)
- Cylinders: Two, outside
- Cylinder size: 670 mm × 770 mm (26.38 in × 30.31 in)
Performance figures
- Maximum speed: 115 km/h (71 mph)
- Tractive effort: 233.5 kN (52,490 lbf)
Career
- Numbers: IS20-1
- Retired: 1965–1987
- Scrapped: 1975–1996

The Soviet locomotive class IS (Russian: ИС; Ukrainian: Паровоз ІС, romanized: Parovoz IS) was a Soviet passenger steam locomotive type named after Joseph Stalin (Russian: Иосиф Сталин; Ukrainian: Йосип Сталін, romanized: Yosyp Stalin). The contract design was prepared in 1929 at V.V. Kuybyshev Locomotive Factory in Kolomna, Russian SFSR. The IS series locomotives were manufactured between 1932 and 1942. The last one was built in 1942 during the Great Patriotic War against Nazi Germany.

== Overview ==
The locomotive used the same cylinders and boilers as the FD series locomotives. However the IS steam locomotive had a 2-8-4 wheel arrangement.

== Construction ==
The first steam locomotive was released from the Kolomna factory on October 4, 1932. In April–December a steam locomotive was tested on the October, Southern, and Ekaterinenskaya railways.

In 1936, production began at October Revolution Locomotive Factory in Voroshilovgrad, Ukrainian SSR (Luhansk, Ukraine). In total, 649 IS steam locomotives were constructed. Later the series was renamed FD^{P} (steam locomotive FD, passenger modification).

== Use ==
These locomotives were used until 1972.

== Gallery ==
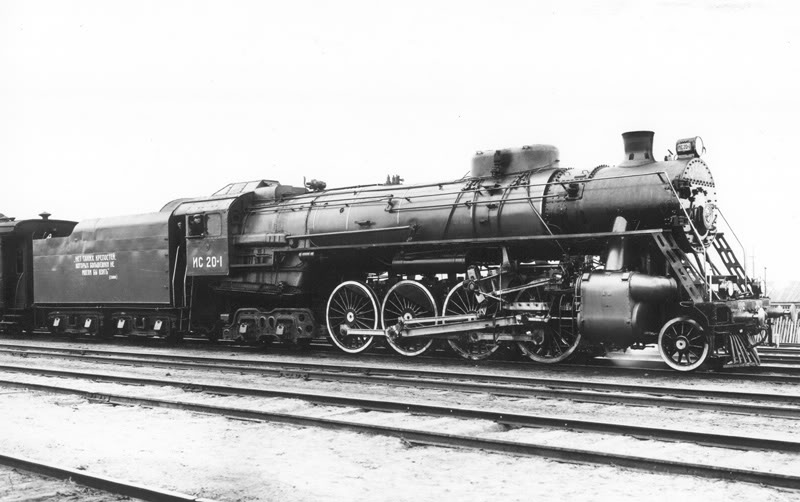
IS20-1 in 1932

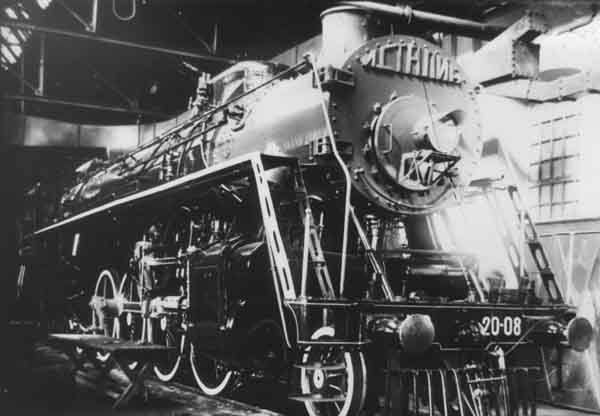
IS20-08 in 1936

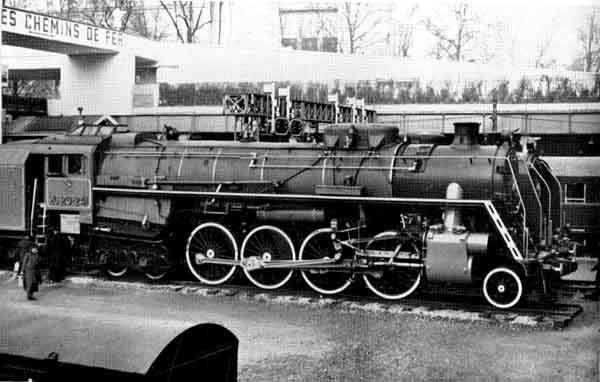
Russian locomotive class IS exhibited in Paris in 1937

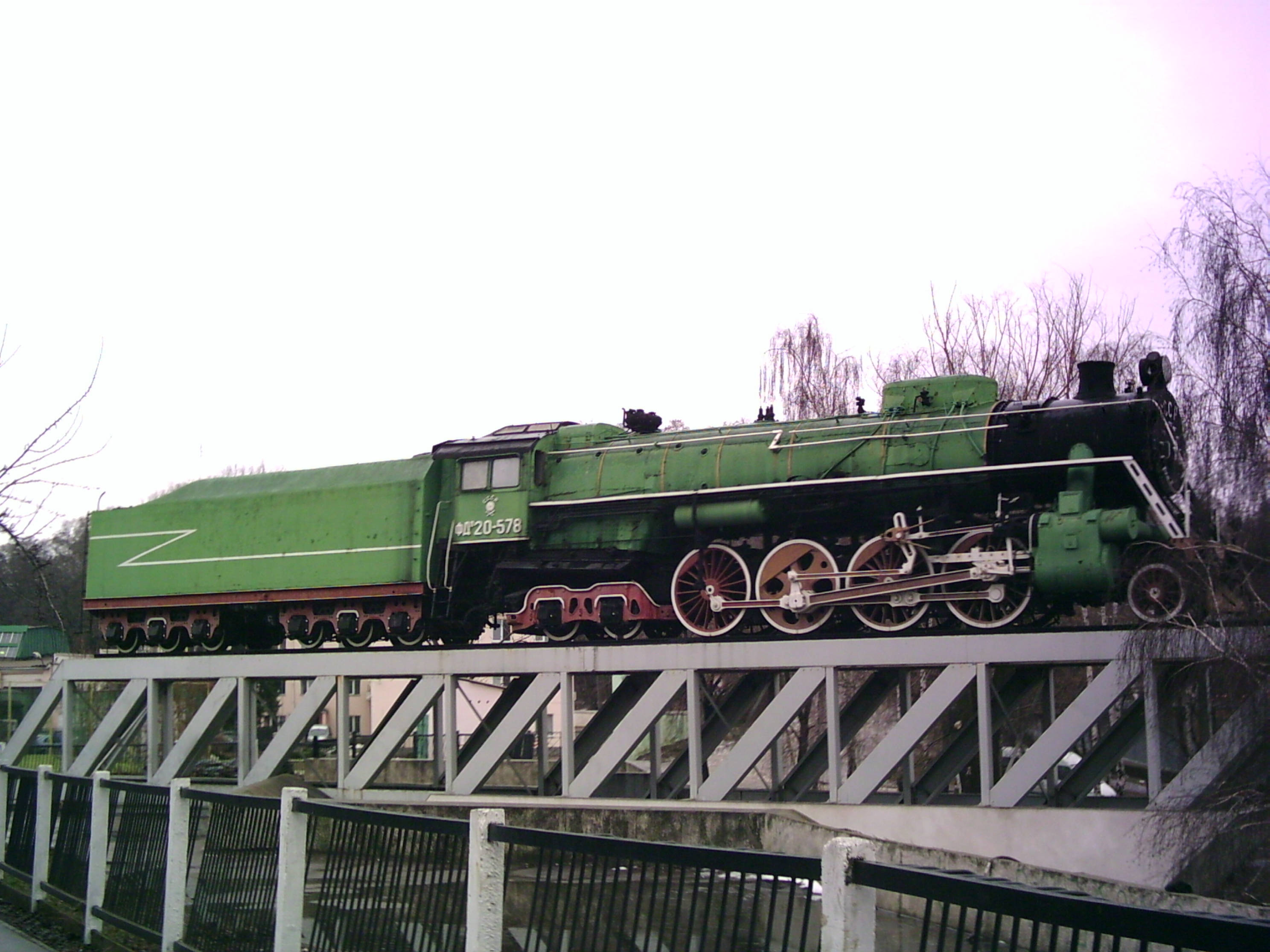
The only preserved IS plinthed IS20-578 in Kyiv

== See also ==
- The Museum of the Moscow Railway, at Paveletsky Rail Terminal, Moscow
- Rizhsky Rail Terminal, Home of the Moscow Railway Museum
- Russian Railway Museum, St.Petersburg
- Finland Station, St.Petersburg
- History of rail transport in Russia

== Books ==
- Главное управление локомотивного хозяйства МПС (1956). Справочник по локомотивам железных дорог СССР (in Russian). Трансжелдориздат.
- Сыромятникова, С.П., ed. (1937). Курс паровозов. Устройство и работа паровозов и техника их ремонта (in Russian). Трансжелдориздат (State Publishing House).
