= JNR Class D62 =

Class of 20 Japanese 2-8-4 Berkshire Type steam locomotives (1950)

Type and origin
- Power type: Steam
- Designer: Hideo Shima [Formerly D52s]
- Builder: Various
- Build date: 1943-1946
- Rebuilder: JNR Hamamatsu Works
- Rebuild date: March 1st 1950 – March 31st 1951
- Number rebuilt: 20
Specifications
- Configuration
  - Whyte: 2-8-4
  - UIC: 1′D2′ h2
- Gauge: 1,067 mm (3 ft 6 in)
- Driver dia.: 1,400 mm (55 1/8 in)
- Adhesive weight: 64 tonnes (63 long tons; 71 short tons)
- Loco weight: 88 tonnes (87 long tons; 97 short tons)
- Firebox
  - Grate area: 3.9 square metres (42 sq ft)
- Boiler pressure: 16.0 kg/cm^{2} (1.57 MPa; 228 psi)
- Heating surface: 167 m^{2} (1,800 sq ft)
- Superheater
  - Heating area: 78 m^{2} (840 sq ft)
- Cylinders: Two, outside
- Cylinder size: 550 mm × 660 mm (21 5/8 in × 26 in)
Performance figures
- Maximum speed: 85 Km/h (52 Mph)
- Tractive effort: 190.196 kN (42,758 lbf)
Career
- Operators: Japanese National Railways
- Numbers: D62 1-D62 20
- Retired: 1966
- Preserved: 0
- Scrapped: 1966
- Disposition: All scrapped

The JNR Class D62 (D62形) is a type of 2-8-4 wheel arrangement steam locomotive built by the Japanese National Railways (JNR) in 1950 and 1951. They were designed by Hideo Shima and rebuilt at Hamamatsu Works between 1950 and 1951.

20 Class D62s were rebuilt from the earlier World War 2 built Class D52, which had a 2-8-2 wheel arrangement and were built between 1943-1946.

== List of D62 locomotives ==
- D62 1 rebuilt from D52 358 (March 1st 1950)
- D62 2 rebuilt from D52 448 (March 2nd 1950)
- D62 3 rebuilt from D52 401 (April 3rd 1950)
- D62 4 rebuilt from D52 450 (May 4th 1950)
- D62 5 rebuilt from D52 449 (June 5th 1950)
- D62 6 rebuilt from D52 42 (July 6th 1950)
- D62 7 rebuilt from D52 344 (August 7th 1950)
- D62 8 rebuilt from D52 366 (September 19th) 1950
- D62 9 rebuilt from D52 94 (October 1st-20th 1950)
- D62 10 rebuilt from D52 132 (November 3rd-30th 1950)
- D62 11 rebuilt from D52 337 (January 1st-5th 1951)
- D62 12 rebuilt from D52 397 (January 6th-15th 1951)
- D62 13 rebuilt from D52 211 (January 19th-23rd 1951)
- D62 14 rebuilt from D52 334 (February 1st-8th 1951)
- D62 15 rebuilt from D52 377 (February 12th-19th 1951)
- D62 16 rebuilt from D52 338 (February 25th-March 1st 1951)
- D62 17 rebuilt from D52 343 (March 2nd-March 6th 1951)
- D62 18 rebuilt from D52 360 (March 15th-March 20th 1951)
- D62 19 rebuilt from D52 339 (March 21st-March 24th 1951)
- D62 20 rebuilt from D52 462 (March 25th-31st 1951)

== Preservation ==
No examples of the class have been preserved.

== See also ==
- Japan Railways locomotive numbering and classification
