= JNR Class D61 =

Class of 6 Japanese 2-8-4 locomotives rebuilt from D51 class 2-8-2s

Class D61
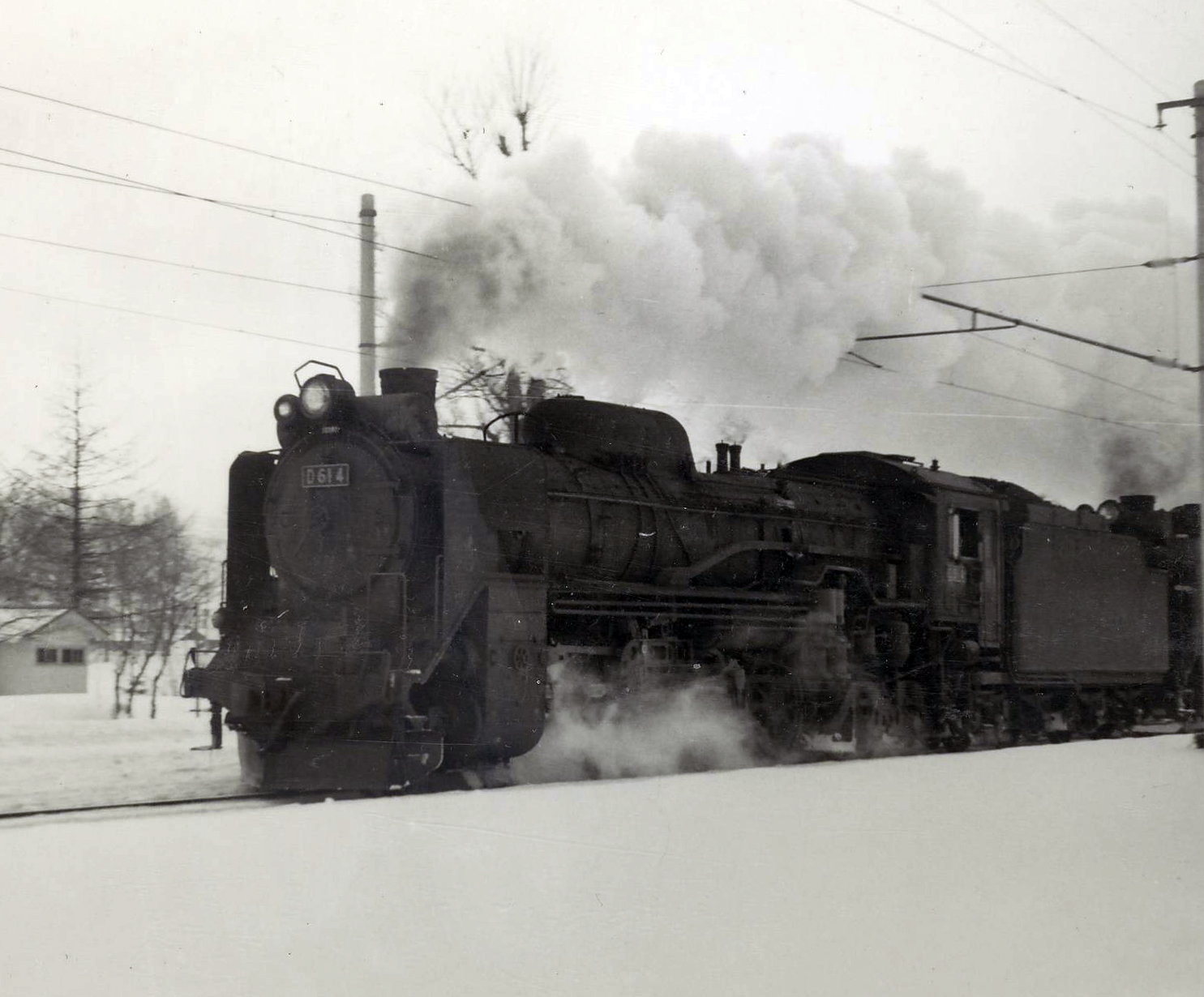
- D61 4 in Hokkaido, ca. 1974
Type and origin
- Power type: Steam
- Build date: 1936-1945
- Total produced: 6
- Rebuilder: JNR Hamamatsu Works and Koriyama Works
- Rebuild date: 1960-1961
- Number rebuilt: 6
Specifications
- Configuration
  - Whyte: 2-8-4
- Gauge: 1,067 mm (3 ft 6 in)
Performance figures
- Maximum speed: 85 km/h (53 mph)
Career
- Operators: JNR
- Number in class: 6
- Numbers: D61 1-D61 6
- Retired: 1975
- Preserved: D61 3
- Scrapped: 1975
- Disposition: One (D61 3) preserved; remainder scrapped

The Class D61 (D61形, D61-gata) is a class of six 2-8-4 steam locomotives built by the Japanese National Railways (JNR) in 1960 and 1961. Designed by Hideo Shima, the D61 was a rebuild of the JNR Class D51, which had a 2-8-2 wheel arrangement. They were rebuilt at JNR Hamamatsu Works and Kōriyama Works.

List Of Class D61

- D61 1 (Rebuilt From D51 640 in 1960 at Hamamatsu Works)
- D61 2 (Rebuilt From D51 555 in 1960 at Hamamatsu Works)
- D61 3 (Rebuilt From D51 181 in 1960 at Hamamatsu Works)
- D61 4 (Rebuilt From D51 224 in 1960 at Hamamatsu Works)
- D61 5 (Rebuilt From D51 205 in 1961 at Kōriyama Works)
- D61 6 (Rebuilt From D51 519 in 1961 at Kōriyama Works)

== Preserved examples ==
As of 2019, one Class D61, D61 3, is preserved in a park in Rumoi, Hokkaido.

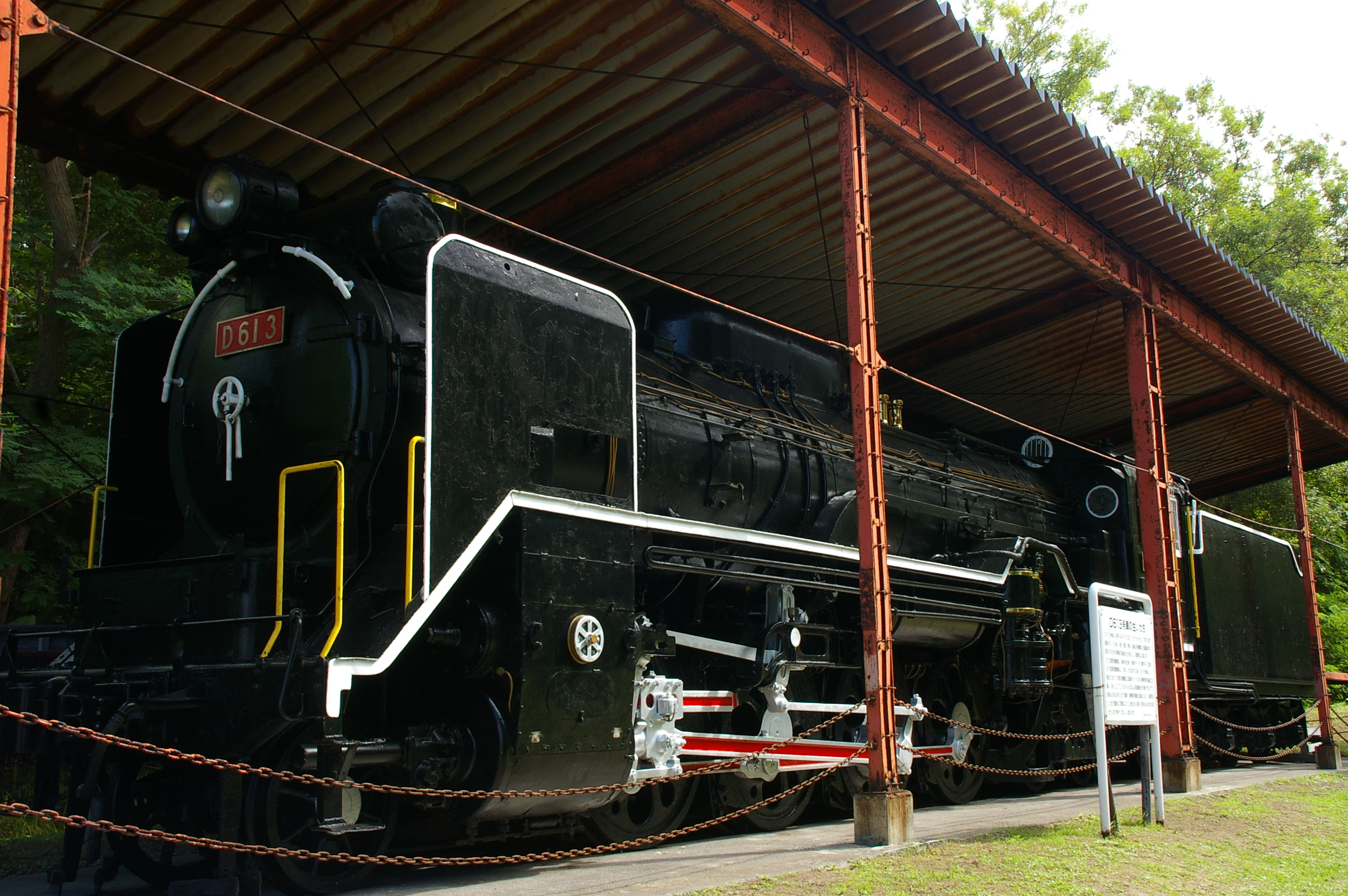
Preserved D61 3 in September 2007

== See also ==
- Japan Railways locomotive numbering and classification
