= D.B. Brinquedos =

Brazilian retail chain

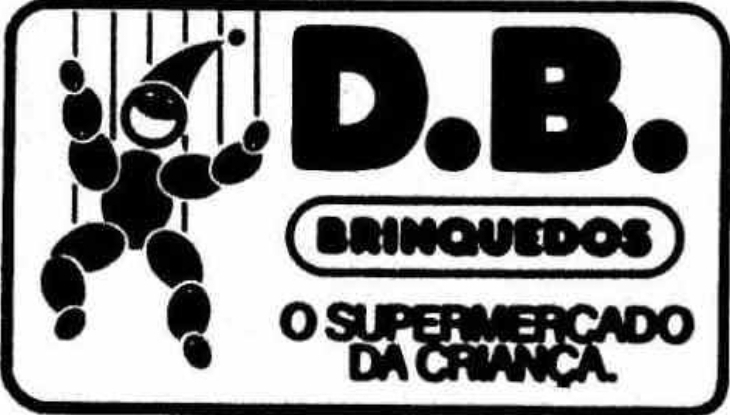
- Company type: Private
- Industry: Retail
- Defunct: 1997
- Headquarters: Brazil
- Products: Toys

D.B. Brinquedos was a Brazilian retail chain specialized in the sale of toys and articles aimed at children. Was a pioneer in this market, it had 35 stores, dominated 40% of South Brazil market, and was the leader until the year in which its activities have been closed in 1997.

One of the major characteristics of the company was counting on huge stores often similar to a real market or specialized shopping mall only with toys.

In October 1997, the chain was officially closed, having been handed down its bankruptcy in the following year at the request of 20 industries of toys that were its creditors – among them Estrela, Candide and Tec Toy – because of debts that reached R$36 million.

In addition to the debt, another strong reason for D.B. Brinquedos declare bankruptcy and cease operations began in 1994, when imported toys sold by street vendors began to strongly compete with the retail toy industry.
