= Ferrorama =

Brazilian toy train system

Ferrorama is a Brazilian battery powered toy train system made by Manufatura de Brinquedos Estrela, which started production around the 1980s. The train sets consist of black plastic track with a steam locomotive, an electric locomotive or both (depending on the set) and rolling stock of various types, including a tender, hoppers, tankers, coaches, etc. The locomotives are powered by two 1.5v batteries. The designs and molds for the components were licensed from TOMY, which developed them for a system called Super Rail that offered a more realistic alternative to Plarail. As a result, the majority of the rolling stock in the range are based on Japanese designs, among them the JNR Class D51, JNR Class DD51 and 0 Series Shinkansen.

Estrela decided to launch an online challenge: in response to popular demand on social media, the company publicly pledged to relaunch the Ferrorama system and held an event that allowed fans to cross the final 20km of the Way of St. James using 110m of track. Participants were required to figure out the distance that their train has passed and put them back on the front line, without leaving any cars derailed. The challengers will come from internet social communities around the product and the cost of travel to Galicia will be paid by the company, but it is unknown whether the population from Santiago de Compostela will support the challenge too.
