= Estrela (company) =

Brazilian toy company

Manufatura de Brinquedos Estrela S.A.
- Type: Sociedade Anônima
- Traded as: B3: ESTR3, ESTR4
- Industry: Toys
- Founded: (1937)
- Headquarters: São Paulo, Brazil
- Key people: Carlos Tilkian (chairman)
- Products: Toys; Board games Dolls; Textiles
- Revenue: ▲US$ 58.8 million (2012)
- Net income: ▲ - US$11.9 million (2012)
- Website: www.estrela.com.br

Estrela is a toy manufacturer in Brazil. The company was founded in São Paulo in 1937, when it started producing dolls and wooden toy cars. In 1944 it became a publicly traded corporation. As of 2005, Carlos Tilkian is CEO of the company.

Its symbol is a four-pointed star, a sort of compass, referring to the company name "Estrela" which means "star" in Portuguese.

In 1985, Estrela managed to acquire some Transformers toys from Hasbro, notably the minibots and jumpstarters transformers, they also had their own original Transformers toys as well as own Transformers factions, the heroic "Optimus" and the evil "Malignus". The company has over four hundred products in their line and three factories in Brazil.

It has its shares listed on B3 under the share codes ESTR4 and ESTR3.

== See also ==
- Ferrorama
