= JNR Class D51 =

Japanese 2-8-2 steam locomotive

JNR Class D51 Soviet Railways D51 Taiwan Railways DT650 Manila Railroad 300 class (1951) KNR Mika7 (미카7)
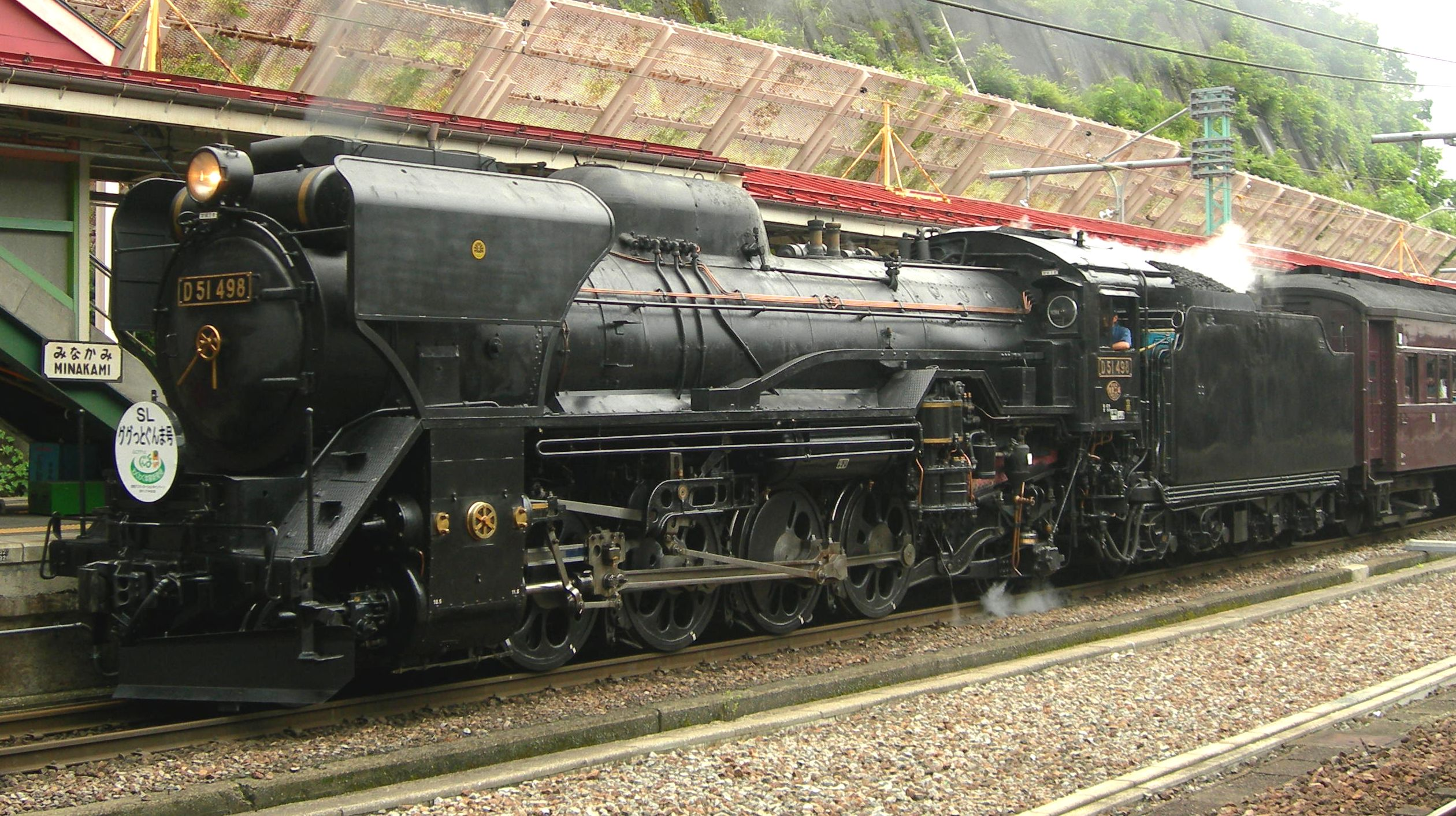
- JR East's D51 498 on the Jōetsu Line in July 2010
Type and origin
- Power type: Steam
- Designer: Hideo Shima
- Builder: Kawasaki Heavy Industries Rolling Stock Company; Kisha Seizo; Hitachi; Nippon Sharyo; Mitsubishi Heavy Industries
- Build date: 1936-1951
- Total produced: 1,115 (Japan); 37 (Taiwan); 10 (Philippines); 2 (Korea); 30 (Soviet Union)
Specifications
- Configuration
  - Whyte: 2-8-2
- Gauge: 1,067 mm (3 ft 6 in); 1,435 mm (4 ft 8 1/2 in) (KNR Mika7)
- Length: 19,730 mm (64 ft 8 3/4 in)
- Loco weight: 76.8 t (75.6 long tons; 84.7 short tons)
- Total weight: 123.0 t (121.1 long tons; 135.6 short tons)
- Fuel type: Coal
- Boiler pressure: 14.0 kg/cm^{2} (199 psi) (Original Boiler Pressure); 15.0 kg/cm^{2} (213 psi) (Increased Boiler Pressure)
- Valve gear: Walschaerts
- Valve type: Piston valve
- Loco brake: Air
- Train brakes: Air
Performance figures
- Maximum speed: 85 km/h (55 mph)
- Tractive effort: 166.4 kN (37,400 lb_{f}) (Original Boiler Pressure); 178.3 kN (40,100 lb_{f}) (Increased Boiler Pressure)
Career
- Numbers: JNR: D51 1-D954, D51 1001-1161 (Japan); TRA: DT651-687 (Taiwan); Soviet Railways: D51-1-D51-30 (Soviet Union); KNR: 1701-1702 (Korea); Manila Railroad: 300-309 (Philippines)
- Retired: 1956 (Philippines); 1965 (Korea); 1975 (Japan); 1979 (Soviet Union); 1983 (Taiwan)
- Disposition: 174 preserved (6 operational); 6 converted into JNR Class D61 (1 preserved) (Japan); 2 preserved (Russia); 4 preserved (Taiwan)

The Class D51 (D51形) is a type of 2-8-2 steam locomotive operated by the Japanese Government Railways (JGR) and later by the Japanese National Railways (JNR). Designed by JGR's chief mechanical engineer Hideo Shima, they were built by Kawasaki Heavy Industries Rolling Stock Company, Kisha Seizo, Hitachi, Nippon Sharyo, Mitsubishi Heavy Industries and JGR's factories from 1936 to 1945.

Although surpassed in speed, power, and size by other locomotives, it is recognized as the most mass-manufactured locomotive, among all power types, in Japanese rail history. A total of 174 units are preserved in Japan, including five operational examples. An additional 6 are preserved in Russia and Taiwan, bringing the total number of preserved units to 180.

== Classification ==
The classification consists of a "D" for the four sets of driving wheels and the class number 51 for tender locomotives that the numbers 50 through 99 were assigned to under the 1928 locomotive classification rule.

== Design and production ==
=== Background of Development ===
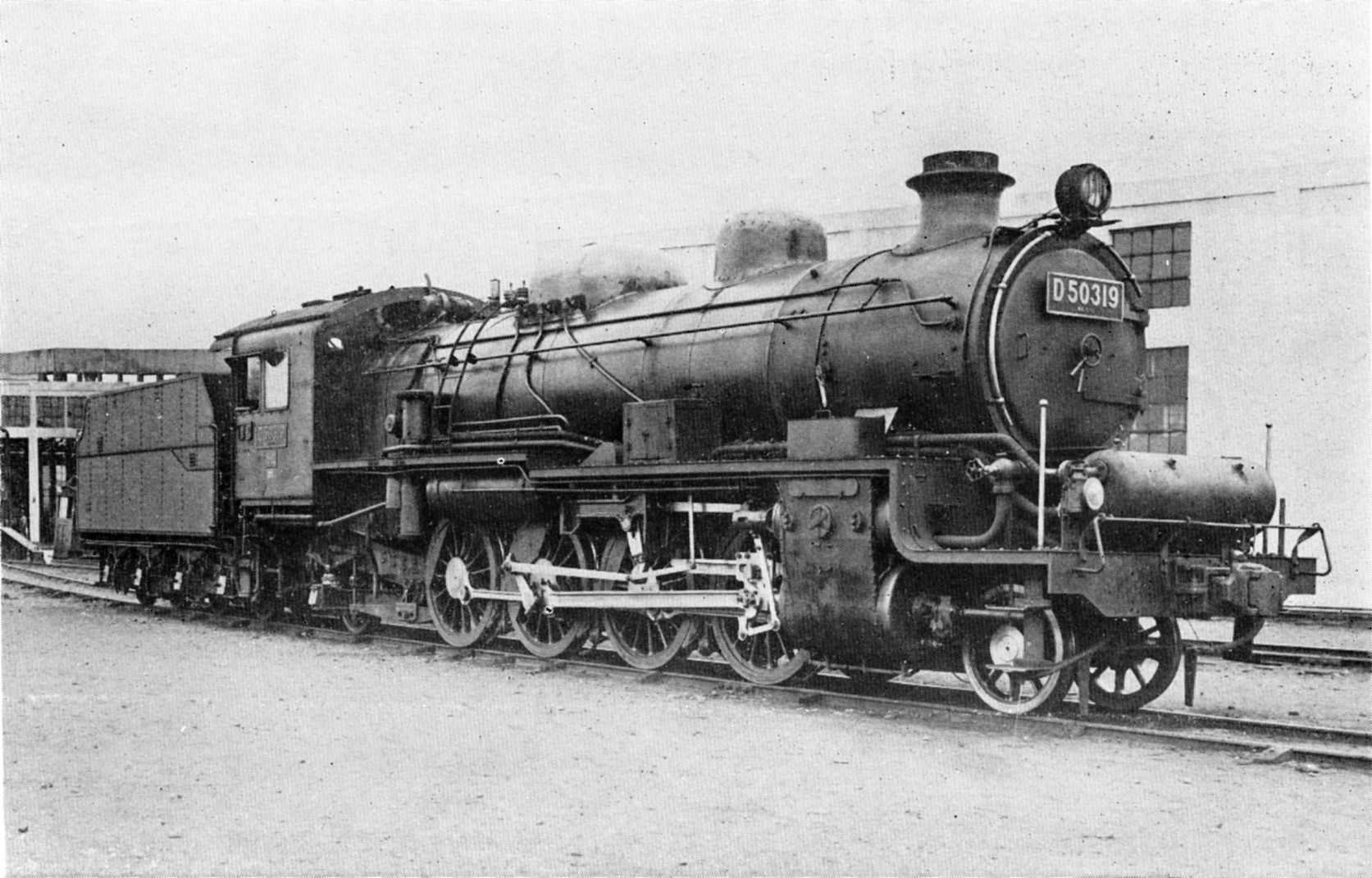
Class D50 (1923), on which D51's design was based

Following the Great Depression of 1929, Japan's rail freight demand declined. This delayed plans for the development and production of new freight locomotives, which were set to become successors to the Class D50. By the mid-1930s, economic recovery led to increased transport demand. Although electrification was in progress, steam locomotives remained the backbone of railway operations. The result was the D51, a mechanically simple, versatile and fuel-efficient freight locomotive. The D51's chief designer, Hideo Shima, later described it as one of his most satisfying designs.

=== Design ===
The D51 was based on the earlier Class D50, with which it shares many design fundamentals, such as a parallel boiler and a 1D1 (2-8-2) wheel arrangement. Notable changes from the Class D50 included:

- Boiler pressure and tractive effort: The boiler pressure was initially raised from the 13 to 14 kg/cm^{2} (1,300 to 1,400 kPa; 180 to 200 psi) and later to 15 kg/cm^{2} (1,500 kPa; 210 psi) in wartime models. Despite a smaller cylinder bore, these changes enhanced tractive effort.
- Weight reduction and adaptability: Electric welding replaced traditional riveting, which resulted in reduction of axle load and overall weight. The maximum axle load was reduced from 14.99 to 14.30 t (16.52 to 15.76 short tons; 14.75 to 14.07 long tons), which allowed operation on lighter secondary lines previously inaccessible to the D50.
- Length reduction: The D51 was 571 mm (1 ft 10.5 in) shorter than the D50 to fit on standard 60 ft (18 m) branch line turntables, thus broadening its operational range.
- Wheel design: The D51 adopted boxpok wheels, which distributed force more evenly across the wheel circumference.

Other issues identified in the D50, such as derailments during reverse operations, were also addressed in the D51's design.

=== Variants ===
The D51 is divided into three types based on the production period and design changes: early type, standard type, and wartime type.

==== Early type (Namekuji) ====
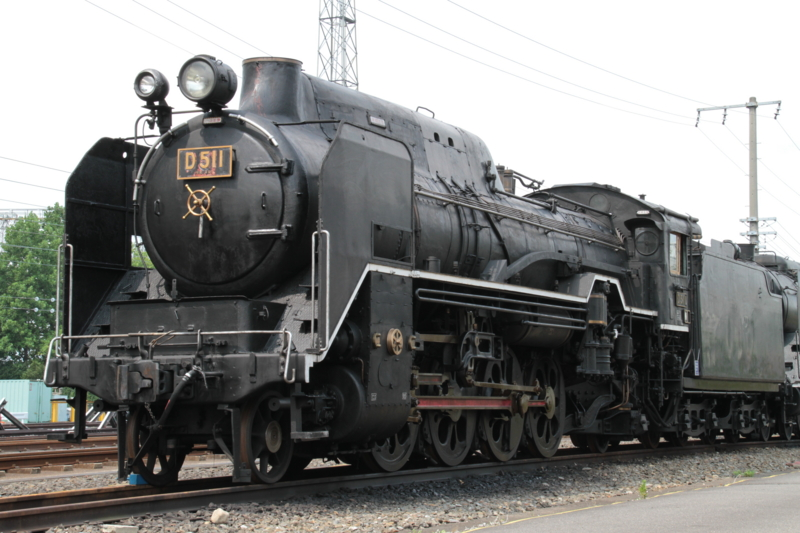
D51 1

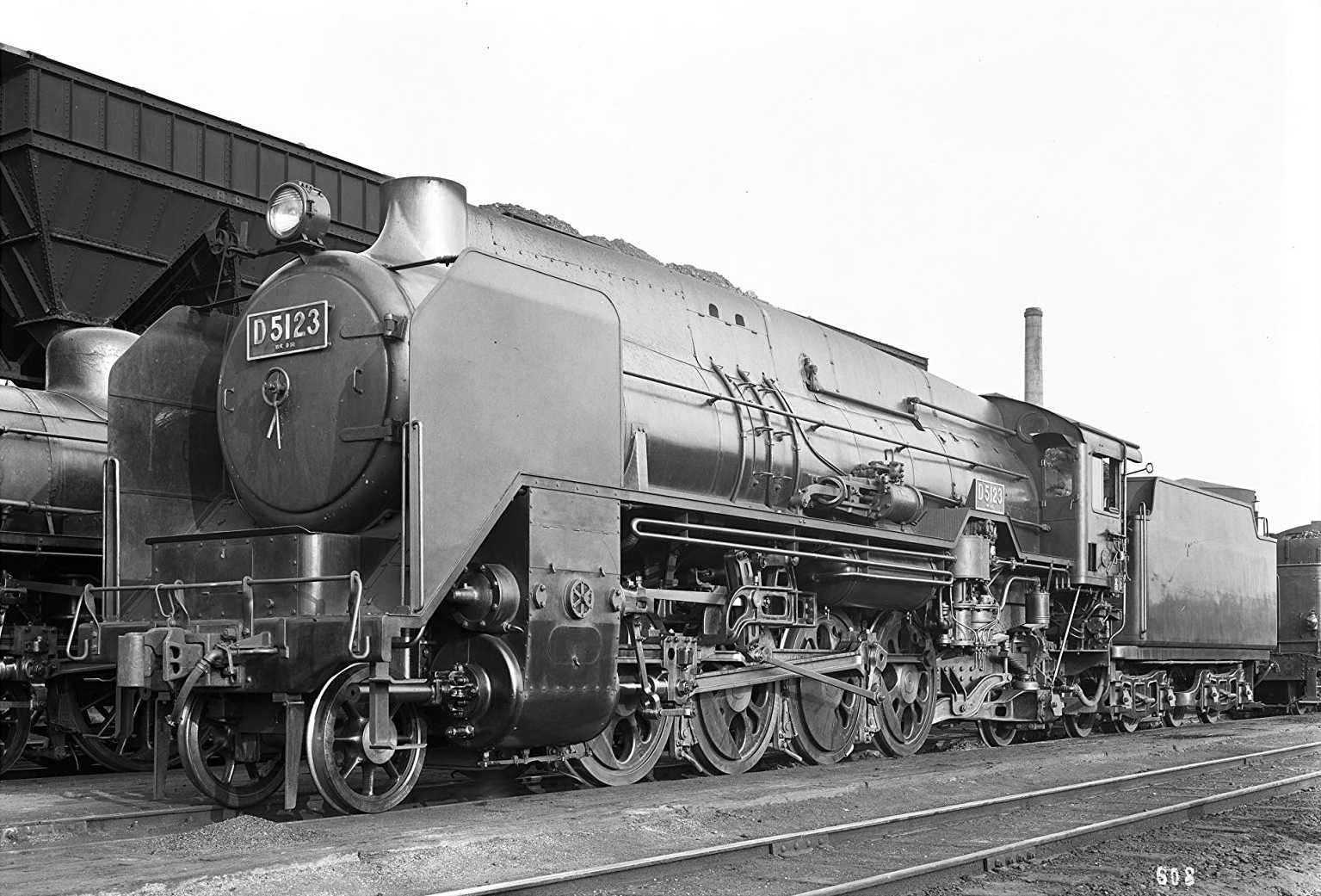
D51 23, one of the Super Slugs

Units produced: D51 1–85, 91–100

Period produced: 1936–1937

Early models are noted for their semi-streamlined appearance, with the feedwater heater positioned between the sand dome and chimney and enclosed in a long casing. This design earned the nickname "Slug" (ナメクジ, Namekuji). Two locomotives, D51 22 and 23, had an extended casing reaching the cab, referred to as "Super Slug" or "Big Slug." These were later modified to match other units because the extended casings required extra maintenance. To balance the shortened overall length compared to the D50, the cab was made smaller. While this reduced weight, it also made the cab more confined, which some crews found uncomfortable. The weight of the first driving axle was lighter than the others, which caused wheel slip under heavy loads. The air-powered reverser was also found to be difficult to use due to its sensitivity. Later modifications, such as adding weight to the front deck, improved traction.

==== Standard type ====
Units Produced: D51 86–90, 101–954

Period produced: 1937–1944

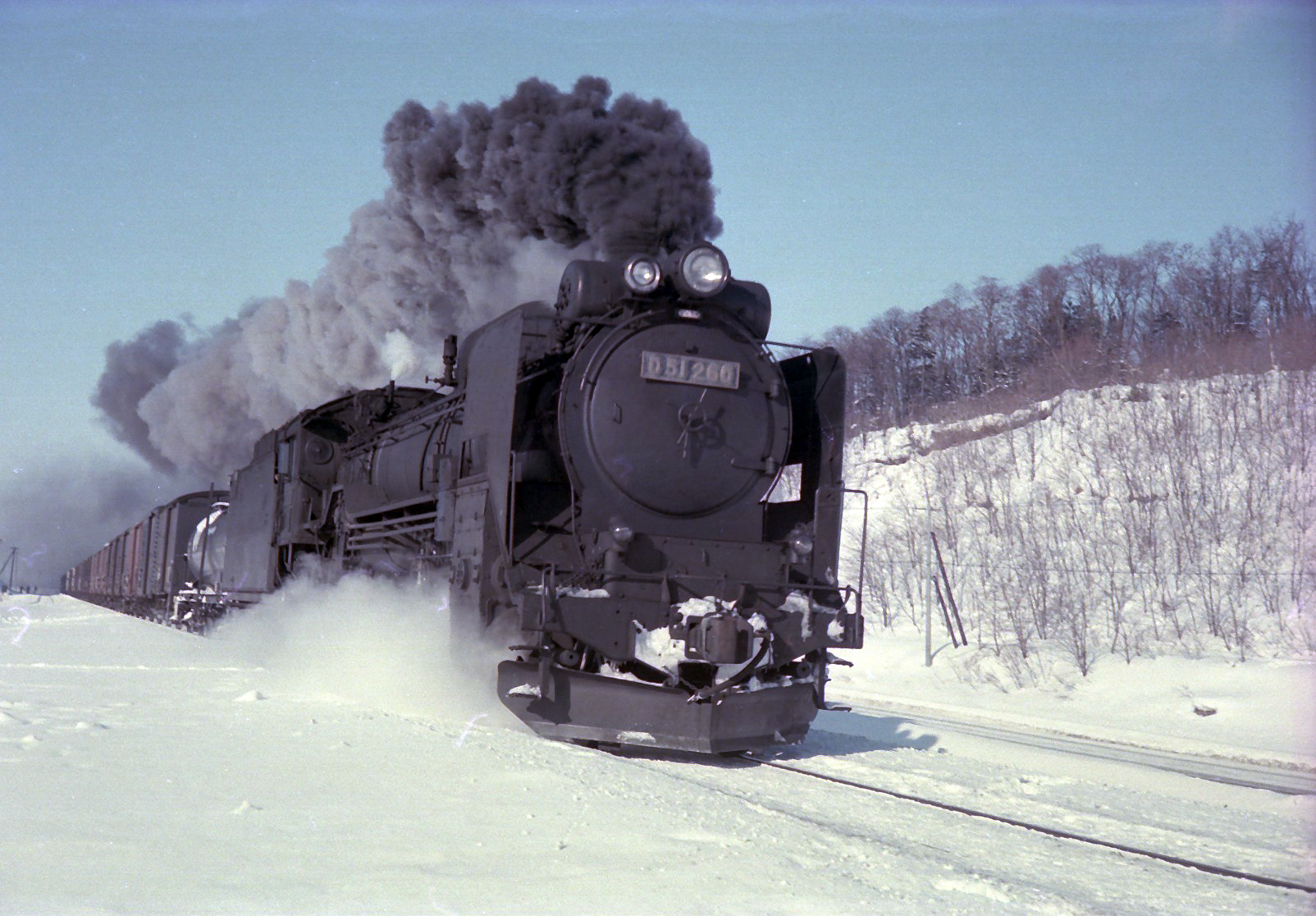
D51 260, one of the standard type D51s on the Muroran Main Line in 1974

The feedwater heater was relocated to a crosswise position in front of the chimney, and the suspension system was adjusted to improve axle weight distribution. The air-powered reverser was replaced with a manual version for better control. From D51 101 onwards, this updated design became standard, and most of the class was built to this specification. Wartime versions of these later units used simplified materials and construction methods, including wooden components and the omission of some design details to conserve resources.

==== Wartime type ====
Units Produced: D51 1001–1161

Period produced: 1944–1945

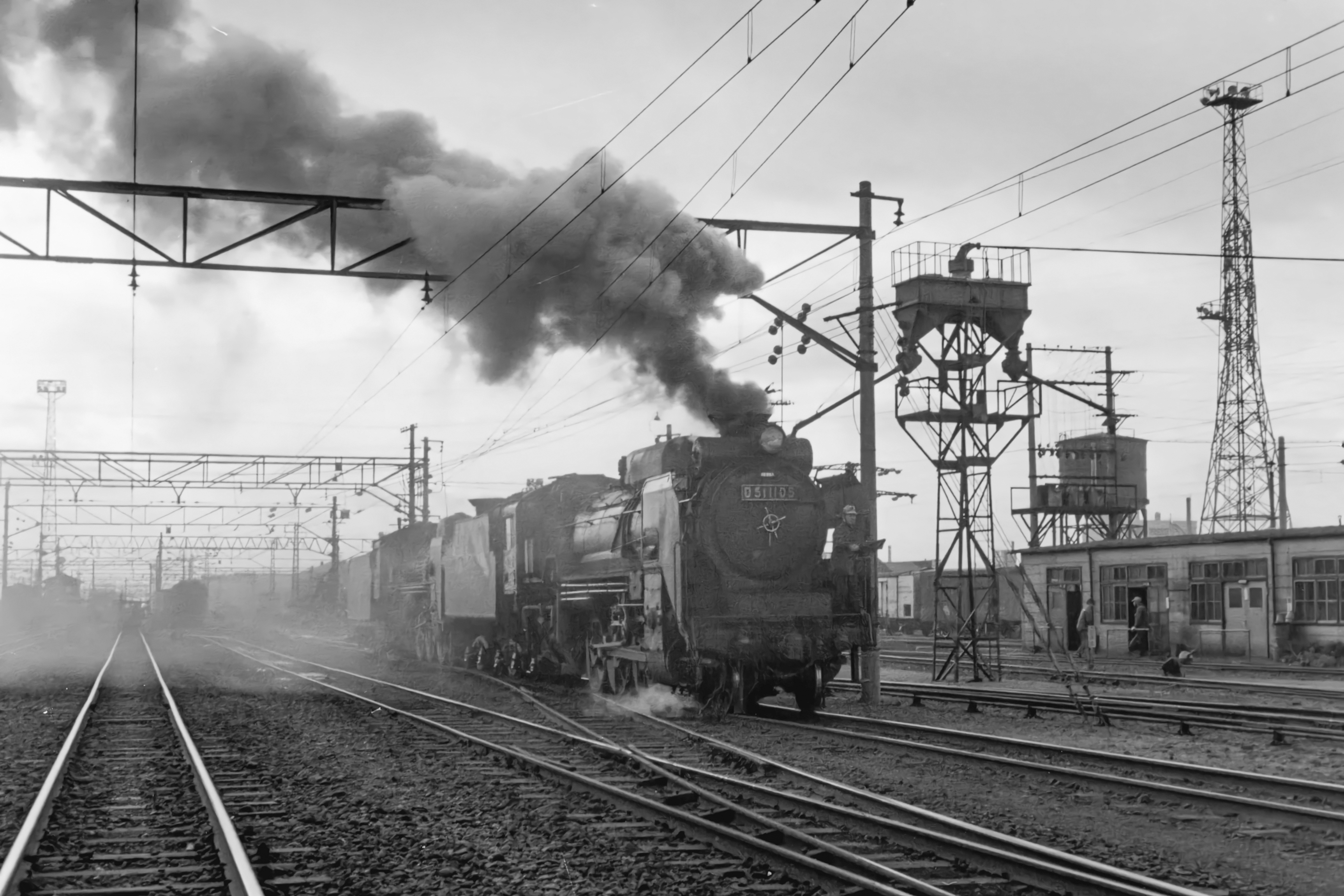
D51 1105, built in 1944, with a boxy wartime-produced casing

Wartime models were built with substitute materials and reduced decorative elements. The dome was reshaped to a flat design, and wooden parts were used for components such as the smoke deflectors. Some tenders adopted a simpler 'ship-bottom' design. To increase hauling capacity, boiler pressure and axle load were raised, but the use of substandard materials and simpler welding caused reliability issues. This resulted in several boiler explosions, notably with D51 1140. After the war, many of these units were retrofitted with standard parts to improve safety and reliability.

== Operations ==
The D51 was widely used across Japan and was a common sight throughout the country. Primarily a freight locomotive, the D51 was occasionally assigned to passenger services, particularly on steeply graded lines such as the Chūō Main Line and the mountainous section of the Hakodate Main Line (Oshamambe–Otaru). On some flatter lines, such as the Uetsu Main Line, it also hauled passenger trains. Notable examples of its service include locomotives assigned to royal trains (on Emperor Shōwa's visit to Shimane in 1971) and units used at yards on main lines, such as Shintsurumi and Suita, for hump shunting.

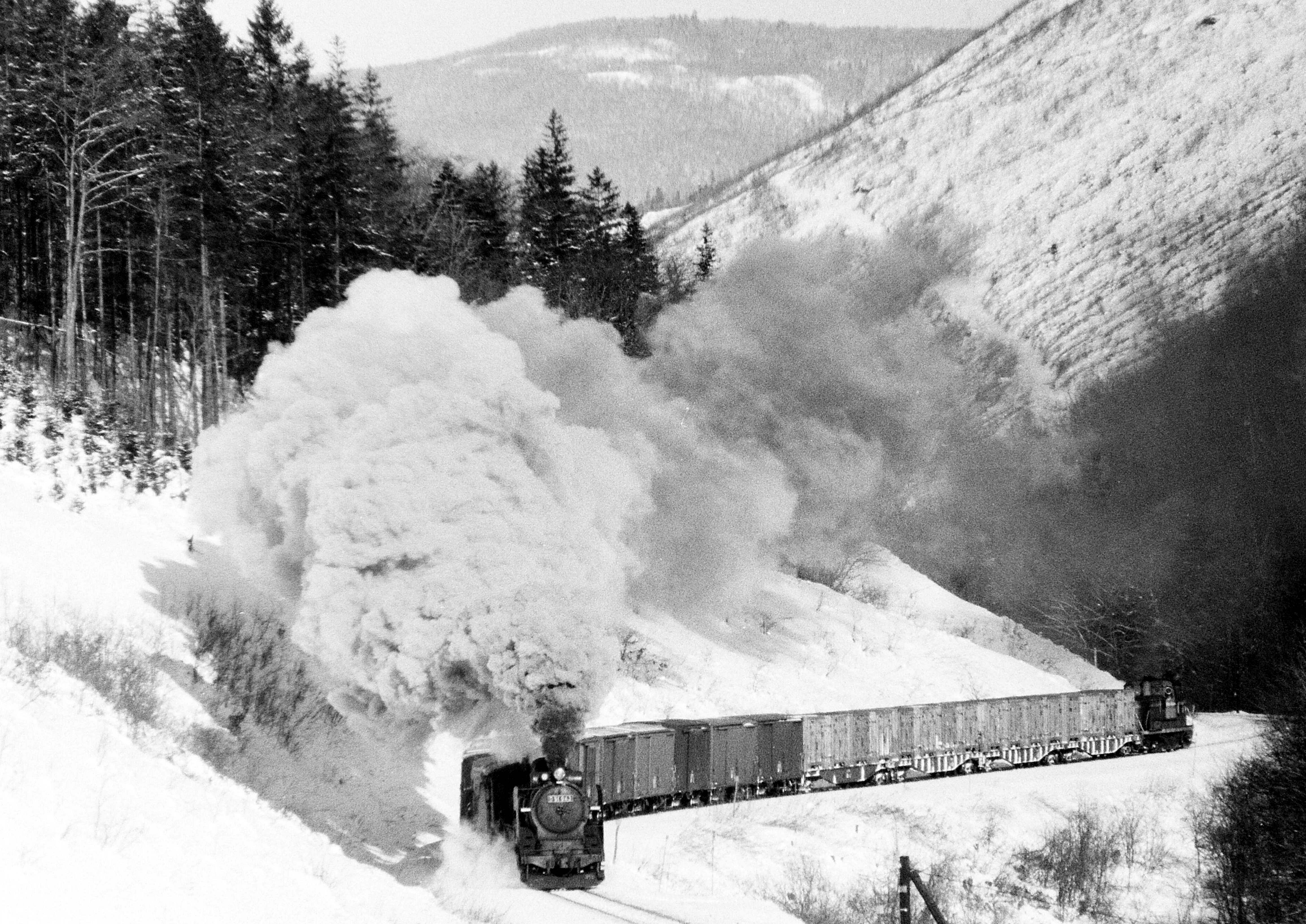
D51 943 hauls a freight train through Jōmon Pass on the Sekihoku Line

From the 1960s, D51 locomotives began to be retired as electrification and dieselisation progressed. However, many remained in service until the final years of steam operation in Japan. During the 1960s and 1970s, they were particularly prominent on steeply graded lines such as the Sekihoku Main Line, Tōhoku Main Line, Ōu Main Line, and Hakubi Line, often operating in double- or triple-headed configurations. These operations attracted railway enthusiasts, photographers, and media attention during the 'SL boom' period. While its ubiquity made the D51 an iconic machine, some enthusiasts seeking rarer locomotive classes expressed disappointment when encountering D51s.

=== Hokkaidō ===
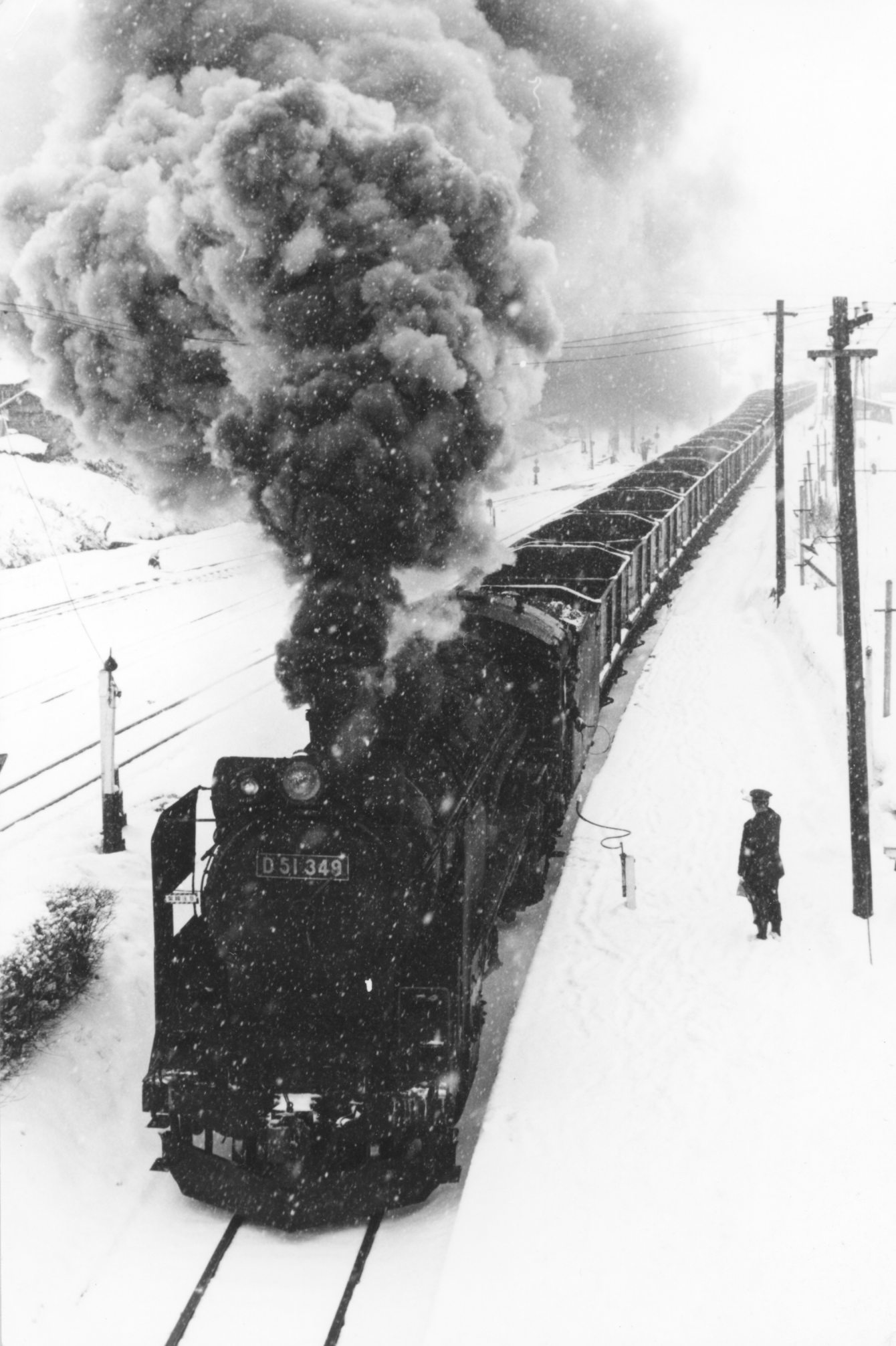
A freight train hauled by D51 349 passing Numanohata Station, 1973

The first D51s in Hokkaidō were assigned to the Otaru-Chikkō and Iwamizawa depots, with units such as D51 6 at Otaru-Chikkō and Nos. 48 and 126 at Iwamizawa. On the Nemuro Main Line, D51 locomotives assigned to the Shintoku depot were used on the old Karikachi Pass section without smoke deflectors and with limited installations of oil-fired systems. D51 241 at the Oiwake depot hauled JNR' final steam-hauled train on 24 December 1975, on the Yūbari Line.

=== Tōhoku ===
D51s were extensively used on major lines such as the Tōhoku Main Line, Ōu Main Line, Jōban Line, and Uetsu Main Line. On the Tōhoku Main Line, triple-heading operations were notable at Jūsanbongi Pass in Ichinohe, Iwate, with locomotives from Morioka, Ichinohe, and Shiriuchi depots. Similarly, triple-heading was common at Yatate Pass on the Ōu Main Line until 1971, by locomotives from depots such as Aomori, Hirosaki, and Akita.

=== Kantō ===
In the Kantō region, D51s were assigned to depots including Takasaki, Utsunomiya, Mito, Ōmiya, Hachiōji, Tabata, Shintsurumi, and Shinkoiwa. At Mito, some units were fitted with automatic coal-feeding equipment in 1957 to accommodate the low-calorific coal from the Jōban coalfield. The electrification of lines such as the Sōbu Main Line and Takashima Line in 1970 led to the withdrawal of D51s from depots such as Shintsurumi. D51 791 was used for farewell passenger services in October 1970, which operated between Tokyo and Yokohama.

=== Chūbu ===
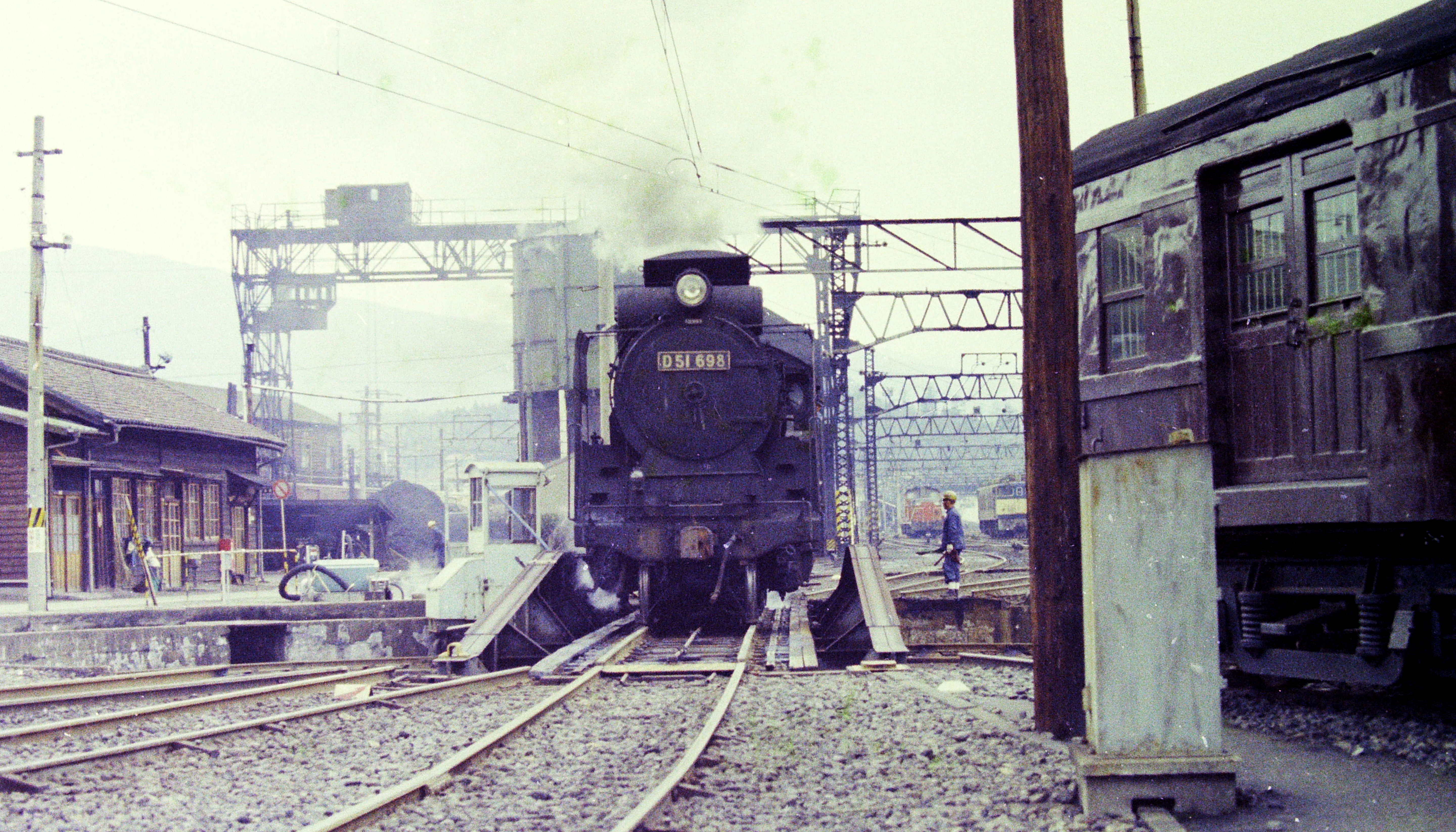
D51 698 at Nakatsugawa Depot

D51s were assigned to the Hokuriku Main Line, including depots at Tsuruga, Fukui, and Kanazawa, where they handled freight operations over steep passes such as the Yanagase and Yamano Tunnels. The electrification of the Hokuriku Main Line was completed by 1964, but some D51s remained in use for local and yard duties until 1971. On the Takayama Main Line, they replaced C58s and 9600s from 1959 until dieselisation in 1969.

=== Kansai ===
In Kansai, D51s were used on lines like the Kansai Main Line, San'in Main Line, and the Fukuchiyama Line. On the Kansai Main Line, they operated in double-headed configurations to manage the steep gradients of the Kabuto Pass.

=== Chūgoku ===
D51s operated on lines such as the Sanyō Main Line, Hakubi Line, and Mine Line. On the Hakubi Line, D51s based at Niimi depot were used for triple-headed limestone freight trains, which attracted significant attention from railway enthusiasts.

=== Shikoku ===
Thirteen D51s were assigned to the Dosan Line, based at the Kōchi depot. These locomotives were eventually replaced by DF50 diesel locomotives by 1960.

=== Kyūshū ===
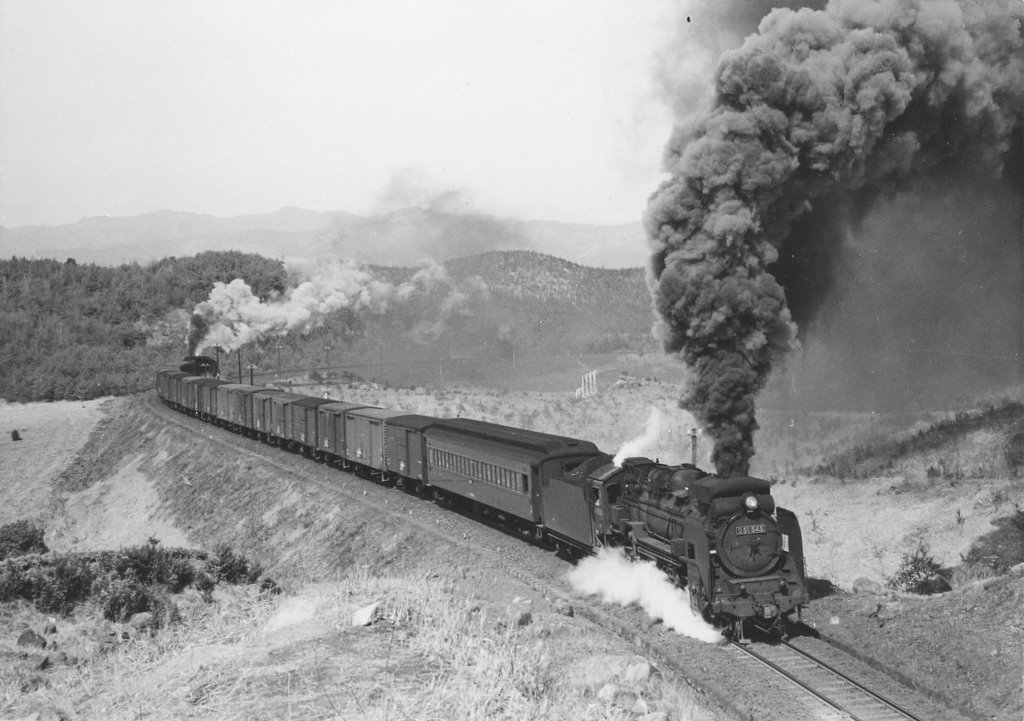
D51 545 leads a push–pull mixed train on the Okoba loop, 8 March 1970

In Kyūshū, D51s were assigned to depots including Mojikō, Tosu, and Kumamoto. On the steeply graded Hisatsu Line, D51s replaced older locomotives such as the Class 4110 for services over the Yatake Pass. These locomotives were equipped with smoke collectors and oil-firing systems.

=== Outside Japan ===
==== Soviet Railways D51 ====
The 30 specially built D51s that were left on Sakhalin (formerly Karafuto) by the retreating Japanese at the end of the Second Sino-Japanese War (1937–1945) and after the Soviet-Japanese War (1945), were used from 1945 until 1979 by Soviet Railways. One was left outside Yuzhno-Sakhalinsk railway station, and one is in running condition and is kept at the Yuzhno-Sakhalinsk railway station. Additionally two wrecks were left to the north of the city.

==== Korean National Railways Mika7 ====
Two locomotives were built for the Korean National Railroad in 1950 by Mitsubishi for South Korea during the Korean War. Designated Mika7 (미카7) class, they were nearly identical to JNR class D51 except for the gauge.

==== Manila Railroad 300 class (1951) ====
According to the a journal published in 1956, ten locomotives were built by Nippon Sharyo for the Manila Railroad Company. These entered service in 1951. Numbered the 300 class, they were named after the cog locomotive class built in the 1910s for the Manila Railway. These locomotives differed from the rest of the D51 builds through the lack of smoke deflectors.

The locomotives had a short service life in the Philippines as Manila Railroad ordered the dieselization of its entire network, having all steam locomotives retired by 1956.

==== Taiwan Railways Administration DT650 ====
From 1936 to 1944, Kawasaki, Kisha Seizō and Hitachi had built 32 D51s for Imperial Taiwan Railway. After World War II, they were taken over by Taiwan Railways Administration, and were classified DT650. In 1951, Kisha Seizō built three DT650s and Mitsubishi Heavy Industries built two DT650s for Taiwan Railways Administration.

== Preserved examples ==
Over 173 Class D51 locomotives are preserved in Japan.

The following is a list of preserved locomotives as of July 2023.

=== Taiwan ===
- DT652: Preserved at Tainan Sports Park.
- DT654: Preserved at East Stone Township, Chiayi County. (The current number is DT651)
- DT668: Preserved in operational condition at Changhua Locomotive Depot.
- DT670: Preserved at Art and Literature Center, Banqiao District, New Taipei City. (The current number is DT675)
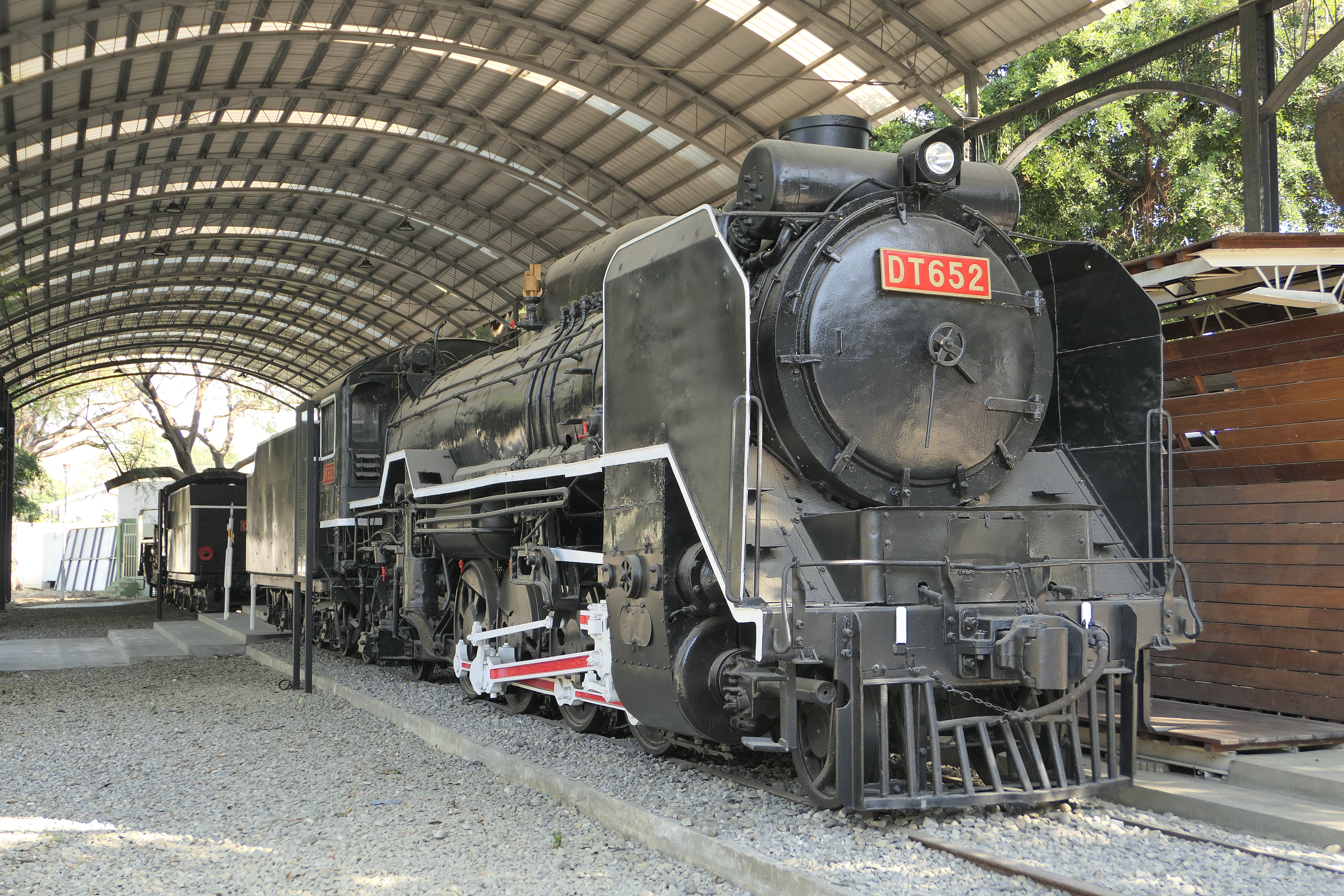
DT652 at Tainan Sports Park

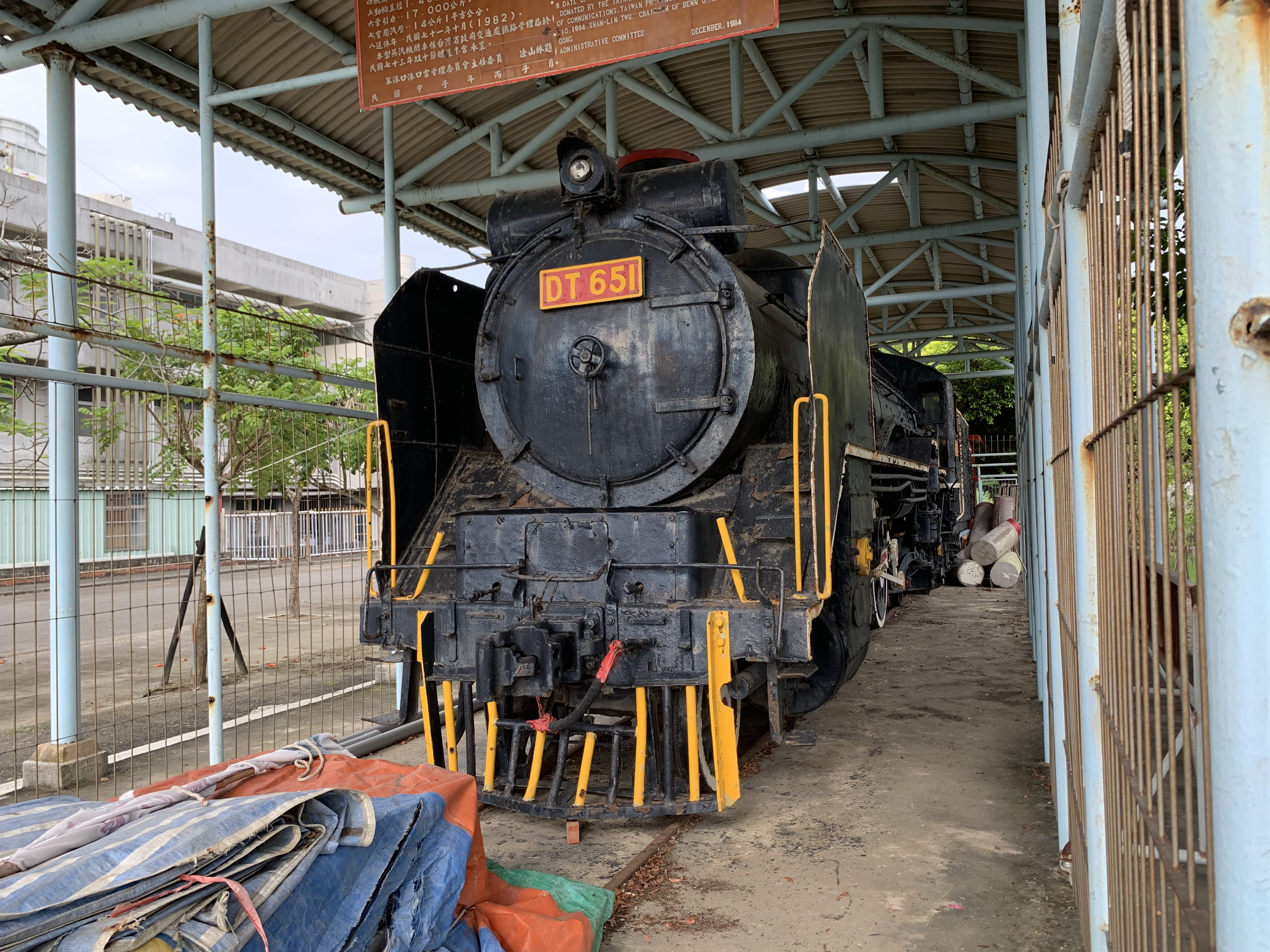
DT654 at East Stone Township, Chiayi County

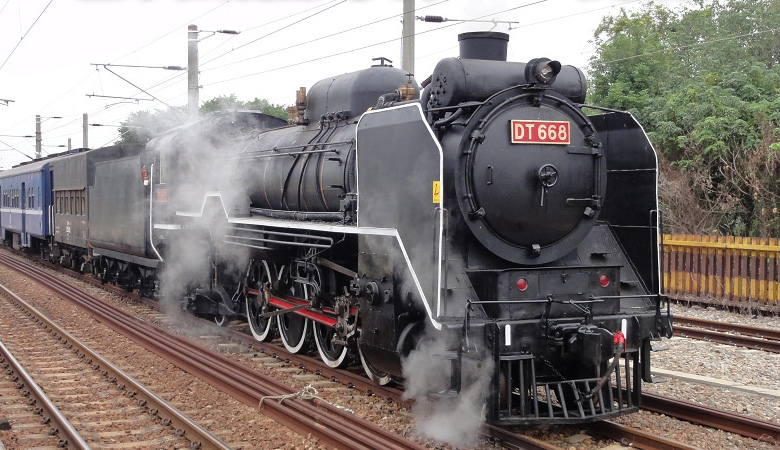
DT668 on a trial run in Taiwan in November 2011

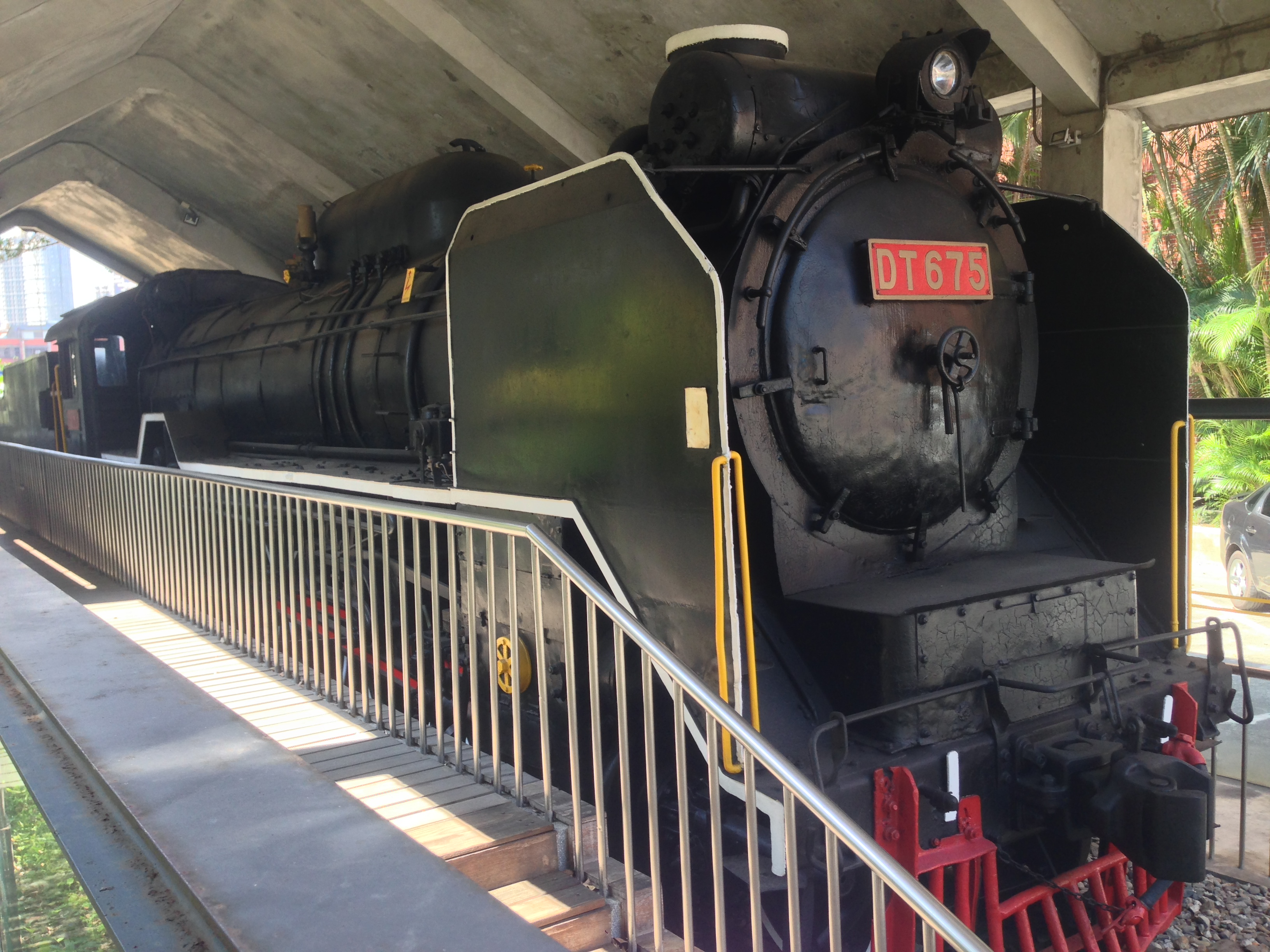
DT675 (Former DT670)

=== Russia ===
- D51-4: Sakhalin (Static display at the Museum of the Sakhalin Railway)
- D51-22: Sakhalin (Plinthed outside Yuzhno-Sakhalinsk railway station)
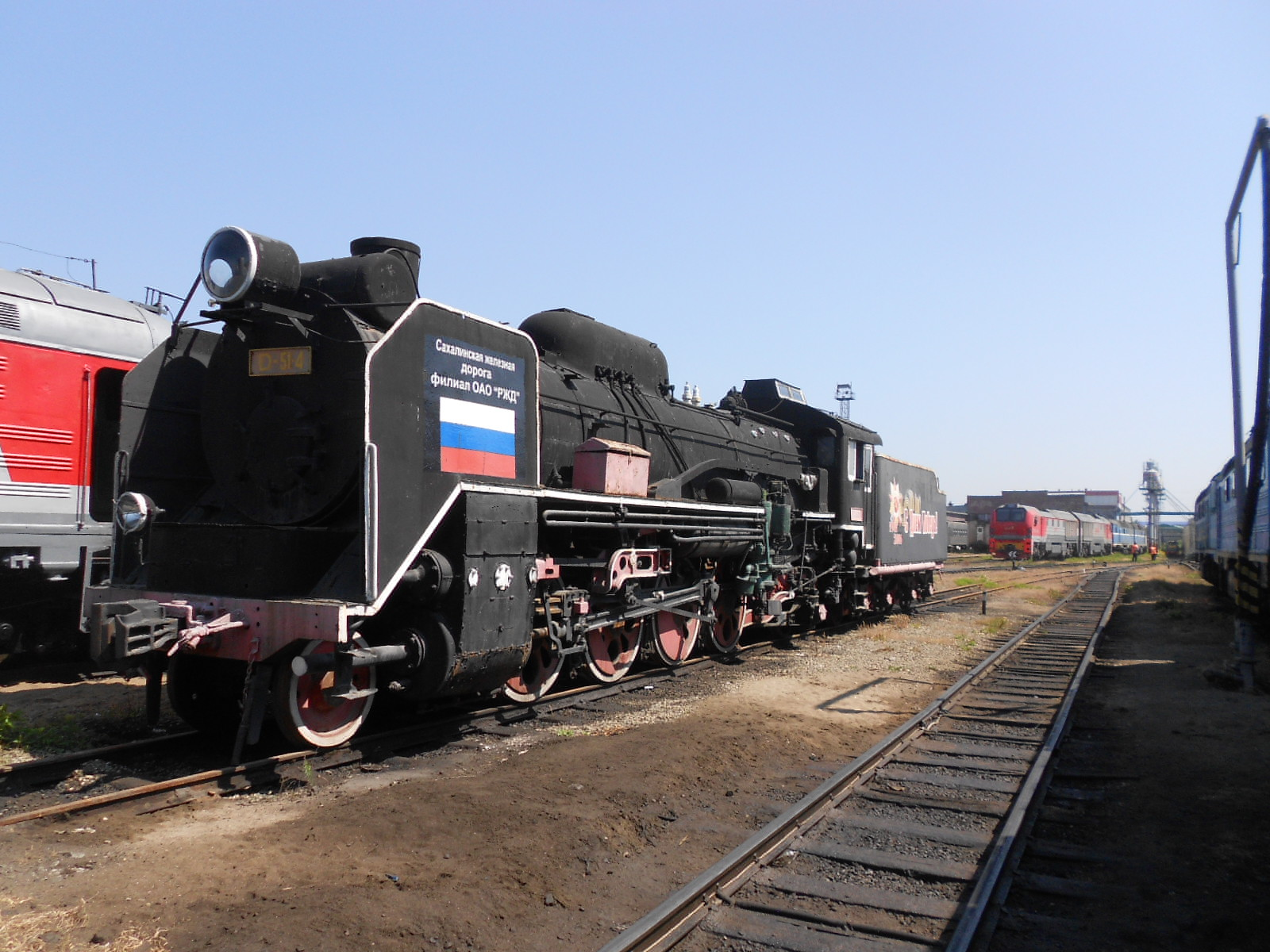
Russian D51-4 at Yuzhno-Sakhalinsk Railway Station Depot Sakhalin Island, Russia

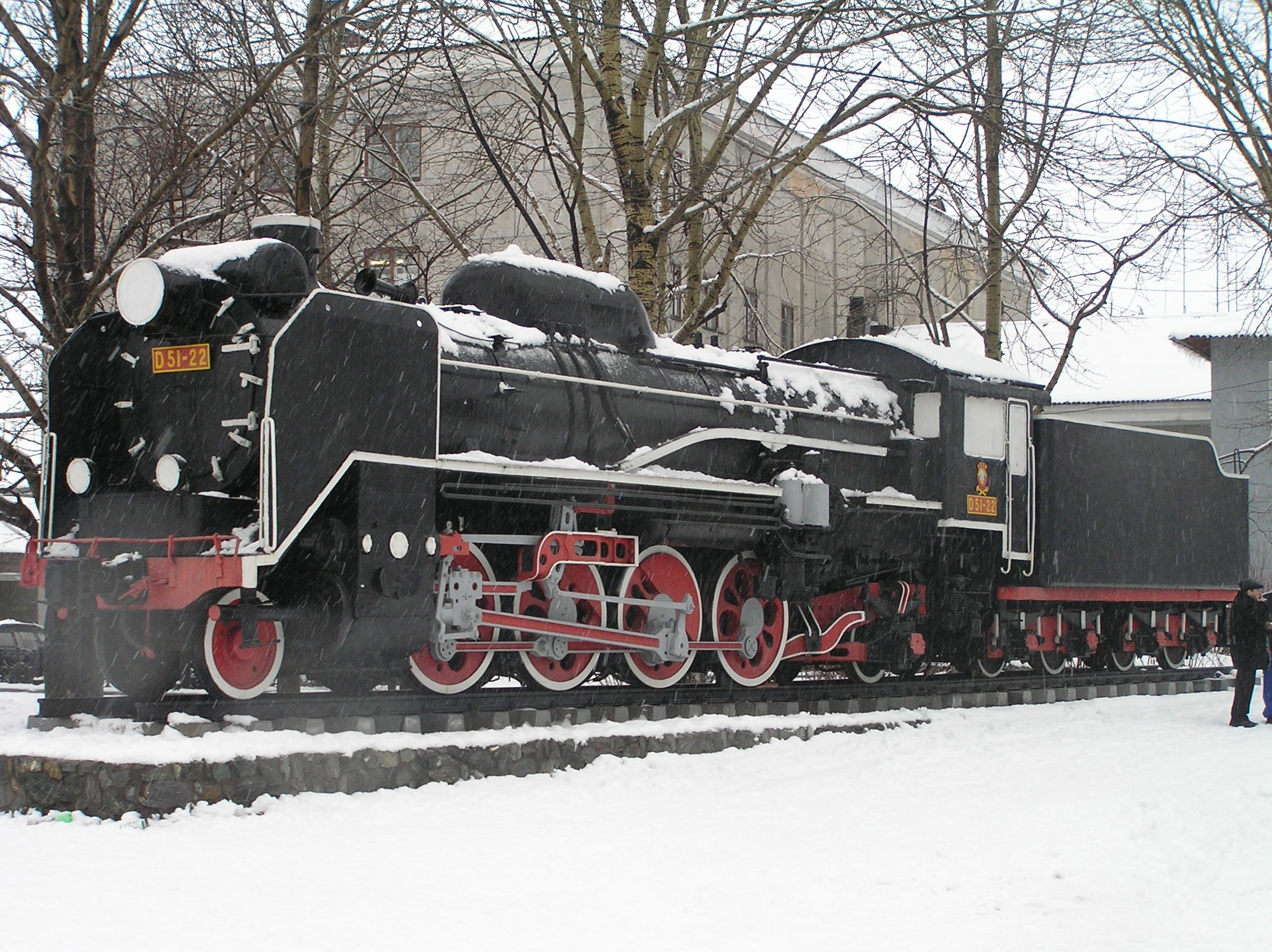
Plinthed Russian D51-22 outside Yuzhno-Sakhalinsk Railway Station Sakhalin Island, Russia

=== Japan ===
==== Operational ====
- D51 146: Operated on the Mooka Railway, runs on compressed air. (Semi-operational)
- D51 200: Preserved in operational condition by JR West at the Kyoto Railway Museum, and was operating the SL Yamaguchi train on the Yamaguchi Line from November 2017 to May 2022, when a crack in one of its bogies was discovered. Restoration work and trial runs were carried out at the Kyoto Railway Museum; the locomotive re-entered service in 2024. From 2017 to 2019, it operated the SL Kita-Biwako on the Hokuriku Main Line.
- D51 320: Operated at a railway museum in Abira, Hokkaido on compressed air. (Semi-operational)
- D51 498: Restored by JR East, based at Takasaki Rolling Stock Center, and pulls special-event trains on JR East lines.
- D51 827: Operated at Aridagawa Railway Park in Wakayama Prefecture, runs on compressed air.
- D51 1149: Operates on compressed air in Toyota, Aichi.

==== Static preservation ====
- Sakhalin D51-1: Niigata Prefecture
- Sakhalin D51-2: Hokkaido
- Sakhalin D51-23: Hokkaido
- Sakhalin D51-25: Hokkaido
- Sakhalin D51-26: Hokkaido
- Sakhalin D51-27: Hokkaido
- D51 1: Preserved at Kyoto Railway Museum
- D51 2: Previously preserved at the Modern Transportation Museum in Osaka, and moved to the Tsuyama Roundhouse next to Tsuyama Station in Okayama Prefecture in March 2015
- D51 6: Preserved in a park in Asahikawa, Hokkaido
- D51 8: Preserved in a park in Amagasaki, Hyogo
- D51 10: Preserved at a community centre in Yukuhashi, Fukuoka
- D51 11: Preserved in a park in Sapporo, Hokkaido
- D51 14: Preserved in a park in Nagareyama, Chiba
- D51 18: Preserved in Tokiwa park, Ube, Yamaguchi
- D51 25: Preserved in a park in Sanda, Hyogo
- D51 47: Preserved in a park in Iwamizawa, Hokkaido
- D51 59: Preserved in a park in Tatsuno, Nagano
- D51 66: Preserved at Kawanishi Elementary School in Seika, Kyoto
- D51 68: Preserved at Koiwai Farm in Shizukuishi, Iwate
- D51 70: Preserved at Sakura Transport Park in Tsukuba, Ibaraki
- D51 75: Preserved in a park in Joetsu, Niigata
- D51 86: Preserved at "Flower Park" in Hamamatsu, Shizuoka
- D51 89: Preserved in a park in Toyohashi, Aichi
- D51 95: Preserved at Shintoku Ski Slope in Shintoku, Hokkaido
- D51 96: Preserved at Usui Pass Railway Heritage Park in Annaka, Gunma
- D51 101: Preserved in Chuo Park in Shimada, Shizuoka
- D51 103: Preserved in a park in Iwakuni, Yamaguchi
- D51 113: Preserved in Chuo Park in Misawa, Aomori
- D51 118: Preserved in Kotesashi Park in Tokorozawa, Saitama
- D51 125: Preserved next to the Funabashi Historical Museum in Funabashi, Chiba
- D51 140: Preserved in Arakawa Park in Kumagaya, Saitama
- D51 155: Preserved outside Shiojiri City Office in Shiojiri, Nagano
- D51 158: Preserved outside a community centre in Ibaraki, Osaka
- D51 159: Preserved in a park in Iwanai, Hokkaido
- D51 165: Preserved in a park in Nanto, Toyama
- D51 170: Preserved in front of Yatake Station in Hitoyoshi, Kumamoto
- D51 172: Preserved in a park in Matsumoto, Nagano
- D51 176: Preserved in a park in Hita, Oita
- D51 187: Preserved in front of JR East's Omiya Workshops, Saitama, Saitama
- D51 194: Preserved in front of Tsuwano Station in Tsuwano, Shimane
- D51 195: Preserved in a park in Yonago, Tottori
- D51 201: Preserved outside Gamagori Museum in Gamagori, Aichi
- D51 206: Preserved in a park next to Saga City Office in Saga, Saga (numberplates have been changed)
- D51 209: Preserved in a park in Ina, Nagano
- D51 211: Preserved at Oji Zoo in Kobe, Hyogo
- D51 222: Preserved in Yogi Park, Naha, Okinawa
- D51 231: Preserved outside the National Museum of Nature and Science in Taito, Tokyo
- D51 232: Preserved at Omoriyama Zoo in Akita, Akita
- D51 237: Preserved at Naebo Works in Sapporo, Hokkaido
- D51 238: Preserved at a community centre in Kiso, Nagano
- D51 243: Preserved in Izu, Shizuoka
- D51 244: Preserved at a children's museum in Kitakyushu, Fukuoka
- D51 245: Preserved at a community centre in Sakaki, Nagano
- D51 254: Preserved in Suginami Jidō Kōtsū Park in Suginami, Tokyo
- D51 260: Preserved in a park in Namerikawa, Toyama
- D51 264: Preserved in a park in Koriyama, Fukushima
- D51 266: Preserved in a park in Nakatsugawa, Gifu
- D51 270: Preserved in Yokote Park in Yokote, Akita
- D51 272: Preserved in Setagaya Park in Setagaya, Tokyo
- D51 286: Preserved in Otaru, Hokkaido
- D51 296: Preserved in Fuchū Transport Park in Fuchū, Tokyo
- D51 297: Preserved in Takikawa, Hokkaido
- D51 300: Preserved in a park in Sanyo-Onoda, Yamaguchi
- D51 303: Preserved in a park in Tottori, Tottori
- D51 311: Preserved in SL Park in Kitami, Hokkaido
- D51 312: Preserved in Sakurayama Park in Fukagawa, Hokkaido
- D51 333: Preserved in Shiraoi, Hokkaido
- D51 337: Preserved in Wassamu, Hokkaido
- D51 345: Preserved in Taishiyama Park in Taishi, Hyogo
- D51 349: Preserved in Okaya, Nagano
- D51 351: Preserved in SL Park in Nagiso, Nagano
- D51 370: Preserved in a park in Akita, Akita
- D51 385: Preserved in a park in Kamagaya, Chiba
- D51 395: Preserved at Tokuyama Zoo in Shunan, Yamaguchi
- D51 397: Preserved in a park in Shibetsu, Hokkaido
- D51 398: Preserved in Nayoro Park in Nayoro, Hokkaido
- D51 401: Preserved at Suzaka Zoo in Suzaka, Nagano
- D51 402: Preserved at a community centre in Iida, Nagano
- D51 403: Preserved in a park in Ritto, Shiga
- D51 405: Preserved in a park in Matsudo, Chiba
- D51 408: Preserved at a museum in Kawasaki, Kanagawa
- D51 409: Preserved at Yamazaki Mazak Corporation Minokamo Factory in Minokamo, Gifu
- D51 422: Preserved in a park in Onomichi, Hiroshima
- D51 426: (Front end only) Preserved at JR East Railway Museum, Saitama, Saitama (Cab section is used as a driving simulator)
- D51 428: Preserved in Higashi-Chofu Park in Ota, Tokyo
- D51 444: Preserved at the SL Hiroba in Kitami, Hokkaido
- D51 451: Preserved in Showa Park in Akishima, Tokyo
- D51 452: Preserved at Ome Railway Park in Ōme, Tokyo
- D51 453: Preserved in Nishiguchi No. 1 Park in Kashiwa, Chiba
- D51 469: Preserved in a park in Takaishi, Osaka
- D51 470: Preserved in Bairin Park in Gifu, Gifu
- D51 481: Preserved in Minamiechizen, Fukui
- D51 483: Preserved in Azumino, Nagano
- D51 485: Preserved in a park in Nobeoka, Miyazaki
- D51 486: Preserved at JR East's Nagano Depot in Nagano, Nagano
- D51 488: Preserved at the Wako Museum in Yasugi, Shimane
- D51 499: Preserved in a park in Tsu, Mie
- D51 502: Preserved in Kamichiba Sunahara Park in Katsushika, Tokyo
- D51 512: Preserved in a park in Shibata, Niigata
- D51 513: Preserved in a park in Itabashi, Tokyo
- D51 515: Preserved in a park in Mito, Ibaraki
- D51 516: Preserved in Honmoku Shimin Park in Yokohama, Kanagawa
- D51 522: Preserved in a park in Kanazawa, Ishikawa
- D51 541: Preserved in a park in Hyuga, Miyazaki
- D51 542: Preserved inside JR Kyushu's Okura Works in Kitakyushu, Fukuoka (sectioned)
- D51 549: Preserved outside an elementary school in Nagano, Nagano
- D51 560: Preserved in Muroran, Hokkaido
- D51 561: Preserved in Kawaba, Gunma (operated at a ski resort hotel using compressed air until 2016)
- D51 565: Preserved in a park in Saroma, Hokkaido
- D51 566: Preserved in Akabira, Hokkaido (not on public display)
- D51 592: Preserved in Kudamatsu, Yamaguchi
- D51 603: Preserved in the "19th Century Hall" at Torokko Saga Station in Kyoto (Front section only)
- D51 607: Preserved in a park in Fukui, Fukui
- D51 609: Preserved in a park in Narita, Chiba
- D51 663: Preserved at a culture centre in Towada, Aomori
- D51 688: Preserved in Minami Park in Okazaki, Aichi
- D51 691: Preserved in a park in Tenri, Nara
- D51 714: Preserved in a park in Kagoshima, Kagoshima
- D51 718: Preserved in a park in Ichinomiya, Aichi
- D51 720: Preserved in a park in Hiroshima, Hiroshima
- D51 724: Preserved in Ekimae Park in Shibukawa, Gunma
- D51 735: Preserved in Murakami, Niigata
- D51 737: Preserved in Nagi Park in Yuasa, Wakayama
- D51 745: Preserved in front of Minakami Station in Minakami, Gunma
- D51 762: Preserved in a park in Hachinohe, Aomori
- D51 764: Preserved in Suita, Osaka
- D51 768: Preserved in Shimonoseki, Yamaguchi
- D51 769: Preserved outside a museum in Omi, Nagano
- D51 774: Preserved outside the former Taisha Station in Izumo, Shimane
- D51 775: Preserved in front of Kiso-Fukushima Station in Kiso, Nagano
- D51 777: Preserved in a park in Kariya, Aichi
- D51 787: Preserved in Miyota, Nagano
- D51 792: Preserved in a park in Kasugai, Aichi
- D51 793: Preserved at Nagahama Railway Square in Nagahama, Shiga
- D51 813: Preserved outside a community centre in Yamaguchi, Yamaguchi
- D51 822: Preserved in front of Mattō Station in Hakusan, Ishikawa
- D51 823: Preserved in a park in Inazawa, Aichi
- D51 824: Preserved in Suwa, Nagano
- D51 828: Preserved in Heiwa Kannon Temple in Awaji, Hyogo (closed and not open to the public)
- D51 831: Preserved in a park in Iga, Mie
- D51 837: Preserved in a park in Komagane, Nagano
- D51 838: Preserved in a car park in Niimi, Okayama
- D51 842: Preserved in a park in Kurashiki, Okayama
- D51 849: Preserved in a park in Toyota, Aichi
- D51 853: Preserved in Asukayama Park in Kita, Tokyo
- D51 859: Preserved in a park in Engaru, Hokkaido
- D51 860: Preserved in a park in Fukuyama, Hiroshima
- D51 862: Preserved in Machida, Tokyo
- D51 882: Preserved in Ibaraki, Osaka
- D51 885: Preserved in Fukaya, Saitama
- D51 889: Preserved in a park in Sōja, Okayama
- D51 892: Preserved in a park in Hirosaki, Aomori
- D51 895: Preserved in a park in Oji, Nara
- D51 916: Preserved in a park in Maebashi, Gunma
- D51 917: Preserved in a park in Kita-ku, Okayama, Okayama
- D51 921: Preserved outside Shinonoi Community Centre in Nagano, Nagano
- D51 923: Preserved in Kurume, Fukuoka
- D51 930: Preserved in a park in Iwade, Wakayama
- D51 943: Preserved in a park in Fuji, Shizuoka
- D51 946: Preserved at the Coal and Fossils Museum in Iwaki, Fukushima
- D51 947: Preserved in Hakone, Kanagawa
- D51 953: Preserved outside Chuo Community Centre in Toyoura, Hokkaido
- D51 954: Preserved outside a community centre in Furano, Hokkaido
- D51 1001: Preserved in front of the Koshoku Gymnasium in Chikuma, Nagano
- D51 1032: Preserved in a park in Yufu, Ōita
- D51 1052: Preserved in Kirin Beer Park Chitose in Chitose, Hokkaido
- D51 1072: Preserved in front of Kobe Station in Kobe, Hyogo
- D51 1085: Preserved in Aridagawa Railway Park in Aridagawa, Wakayama
- D51 1101: Preserved at Mikasa Park in Yokosuka, Kanagawa
- D51 1108: Preserved at Sendai Shinkansen Depot in Rifu, Miyagi
- D51 1116: Preserved at The Hirosawa City, Chikusei, Ibaraki
- D51 1119: Preserved in a park in Atsugi, Kanagawa
- D51 1142: Preserved in a park in Sasebo, Nagasaki
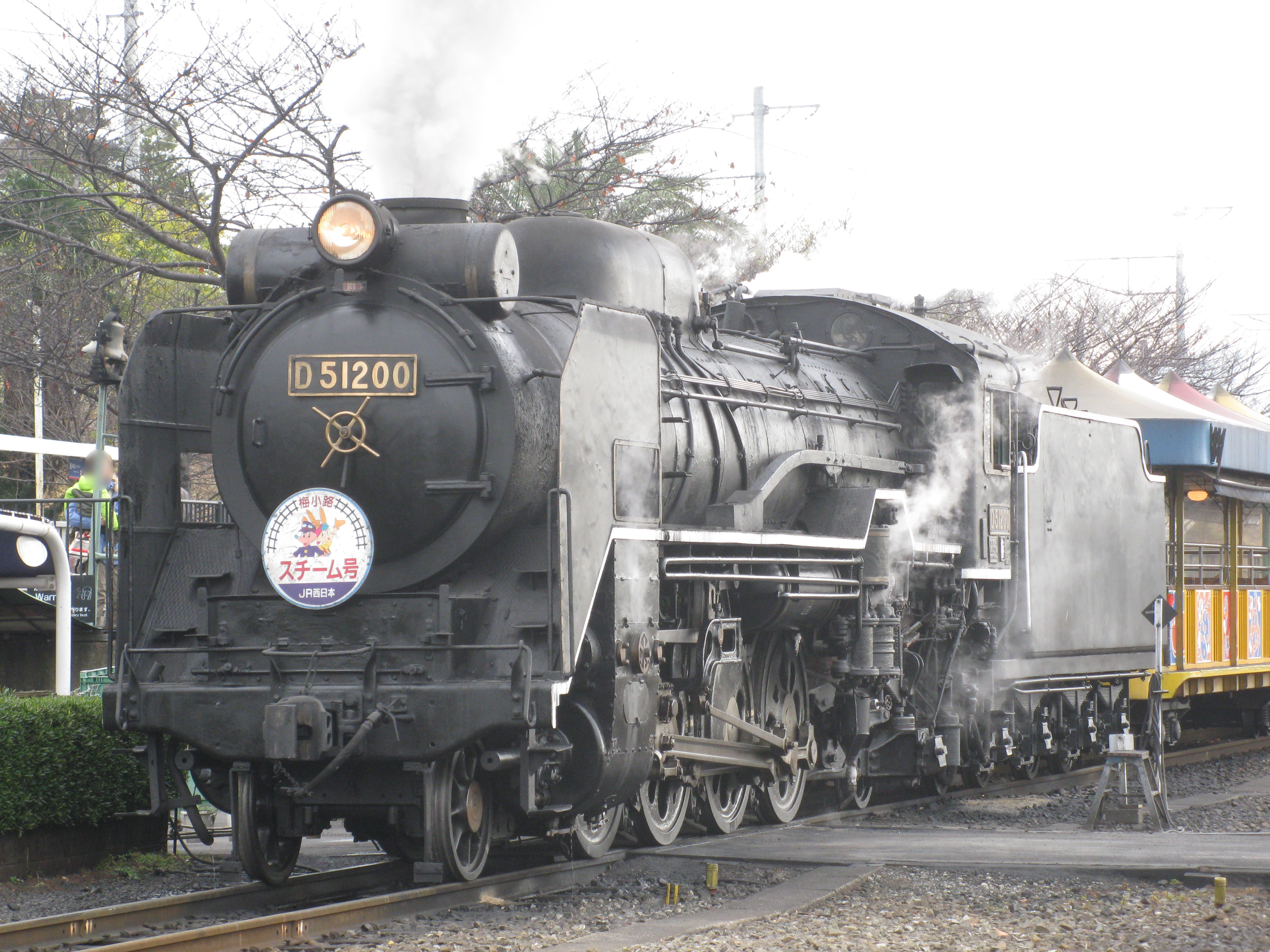
D51 200 at the Umekoji Steam Locomotive Museum in December 2011

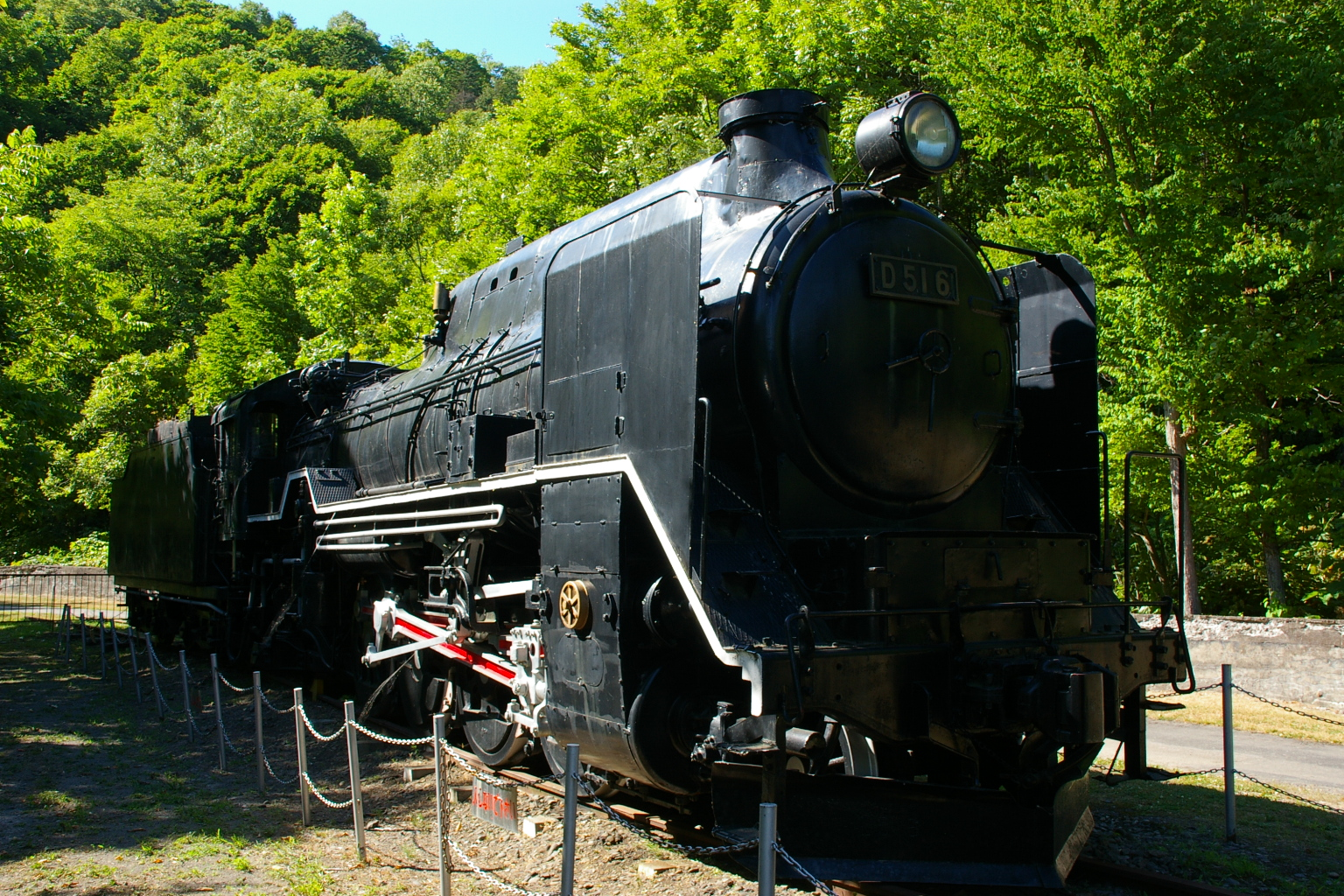
D51 6 in Asahikawa, Hokkaido

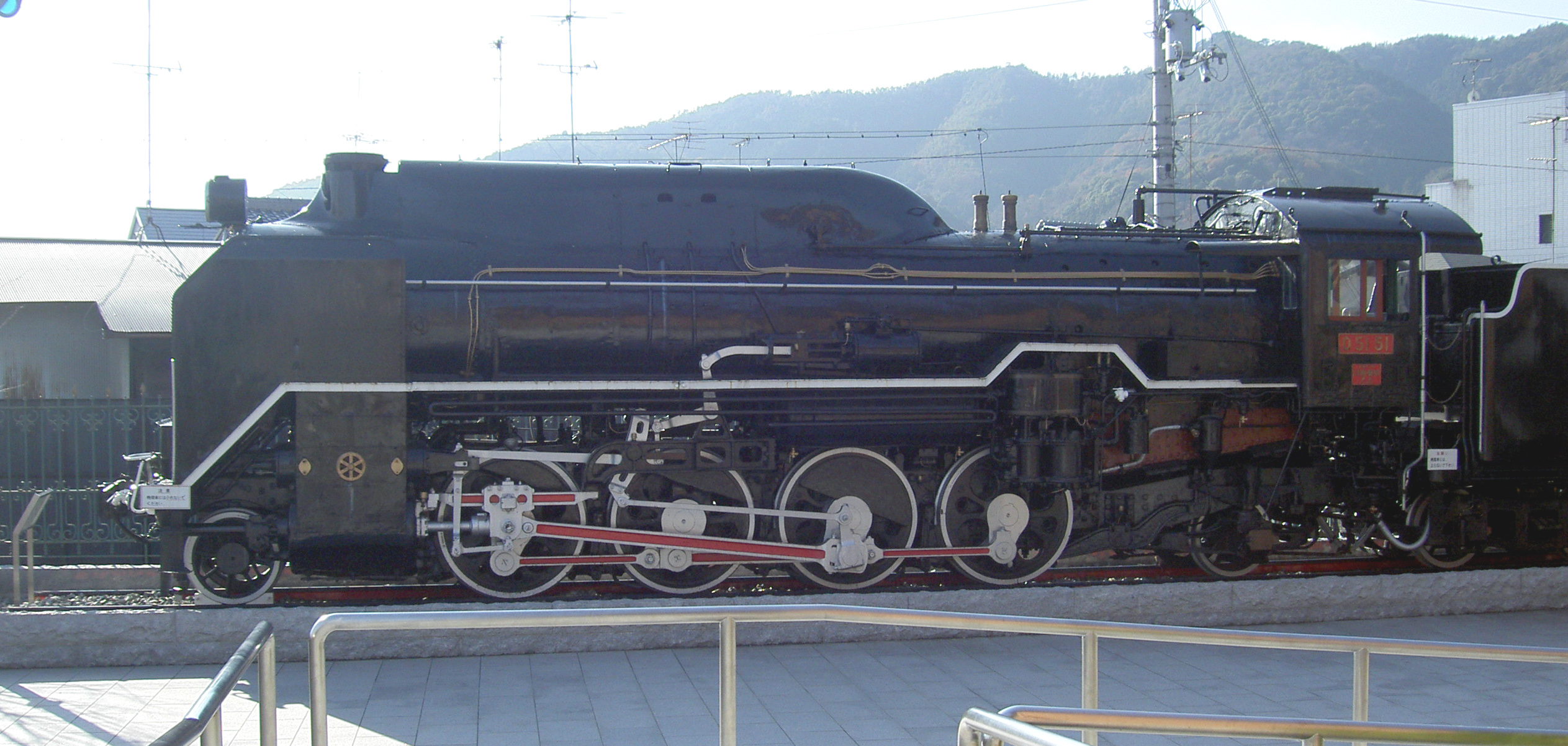
D51 51 ("Slug" type)

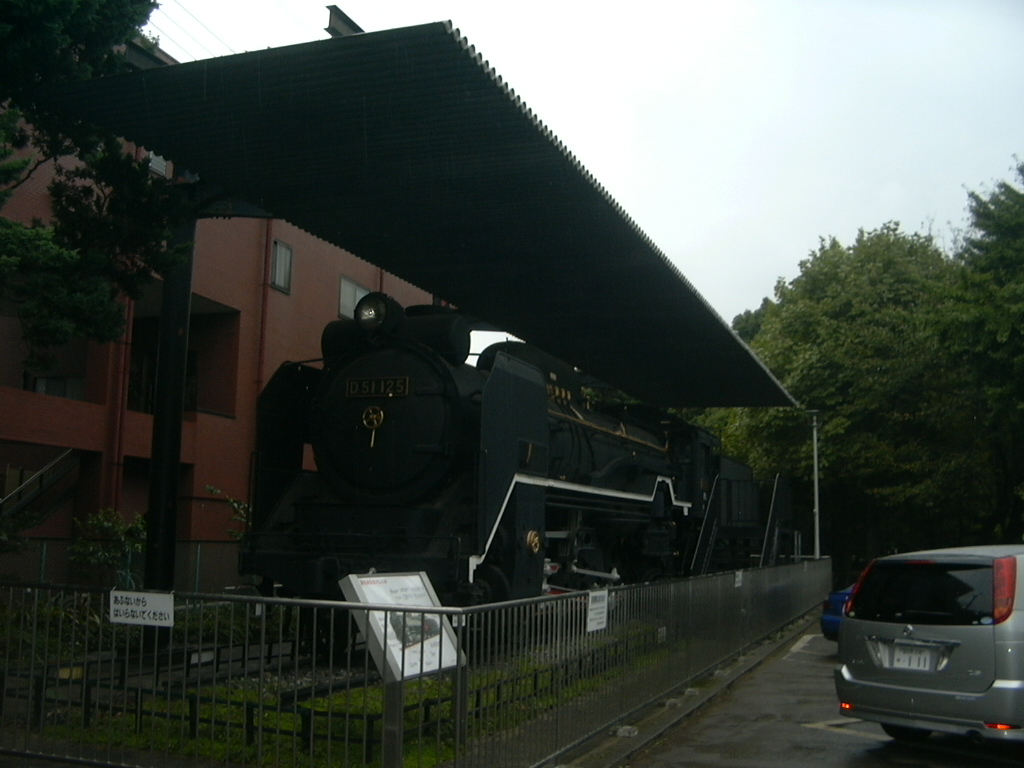
D51 125 in Funabashi, Chiba

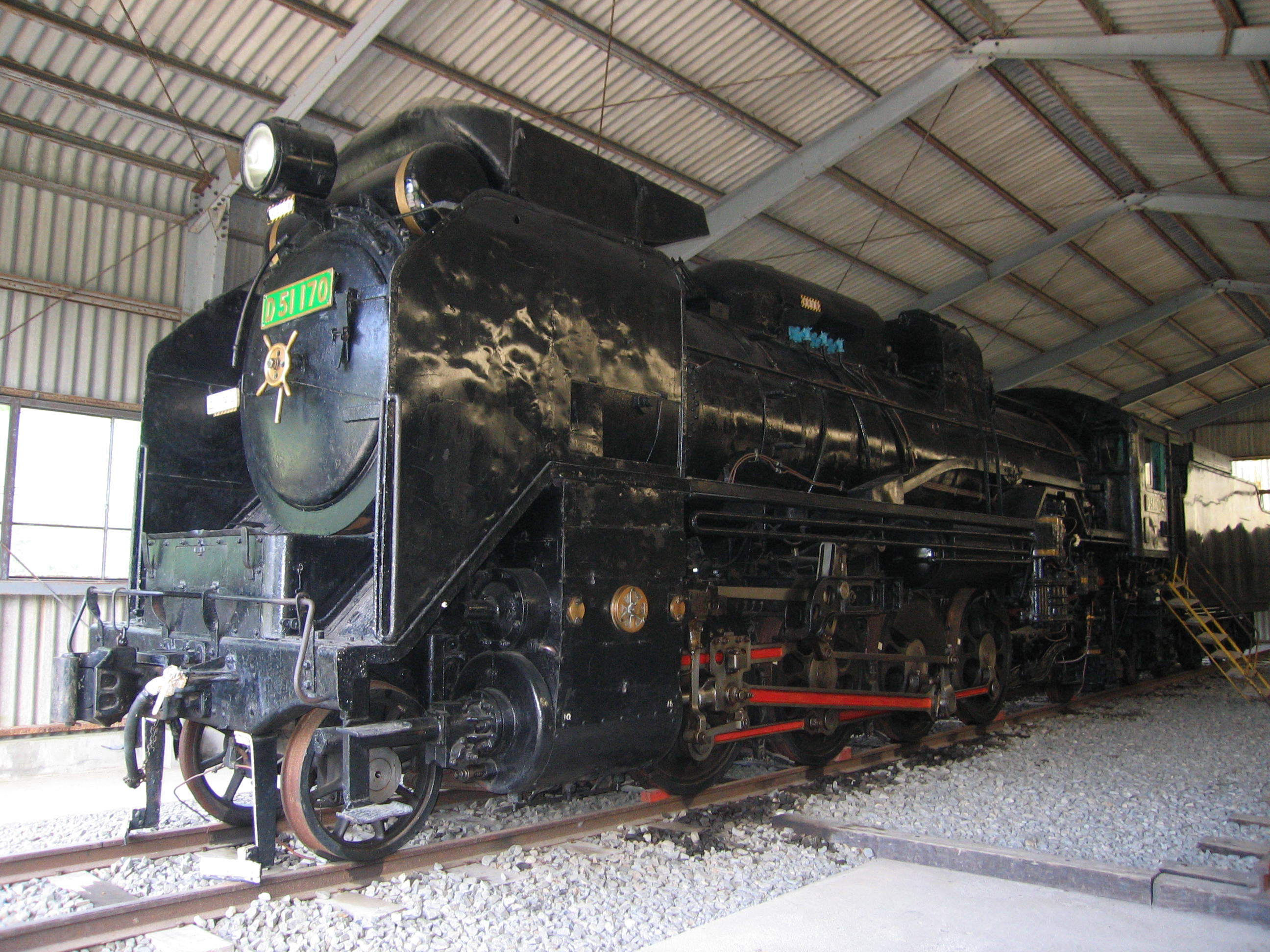
D51 170 in Hitoyoshi, Kumamoto

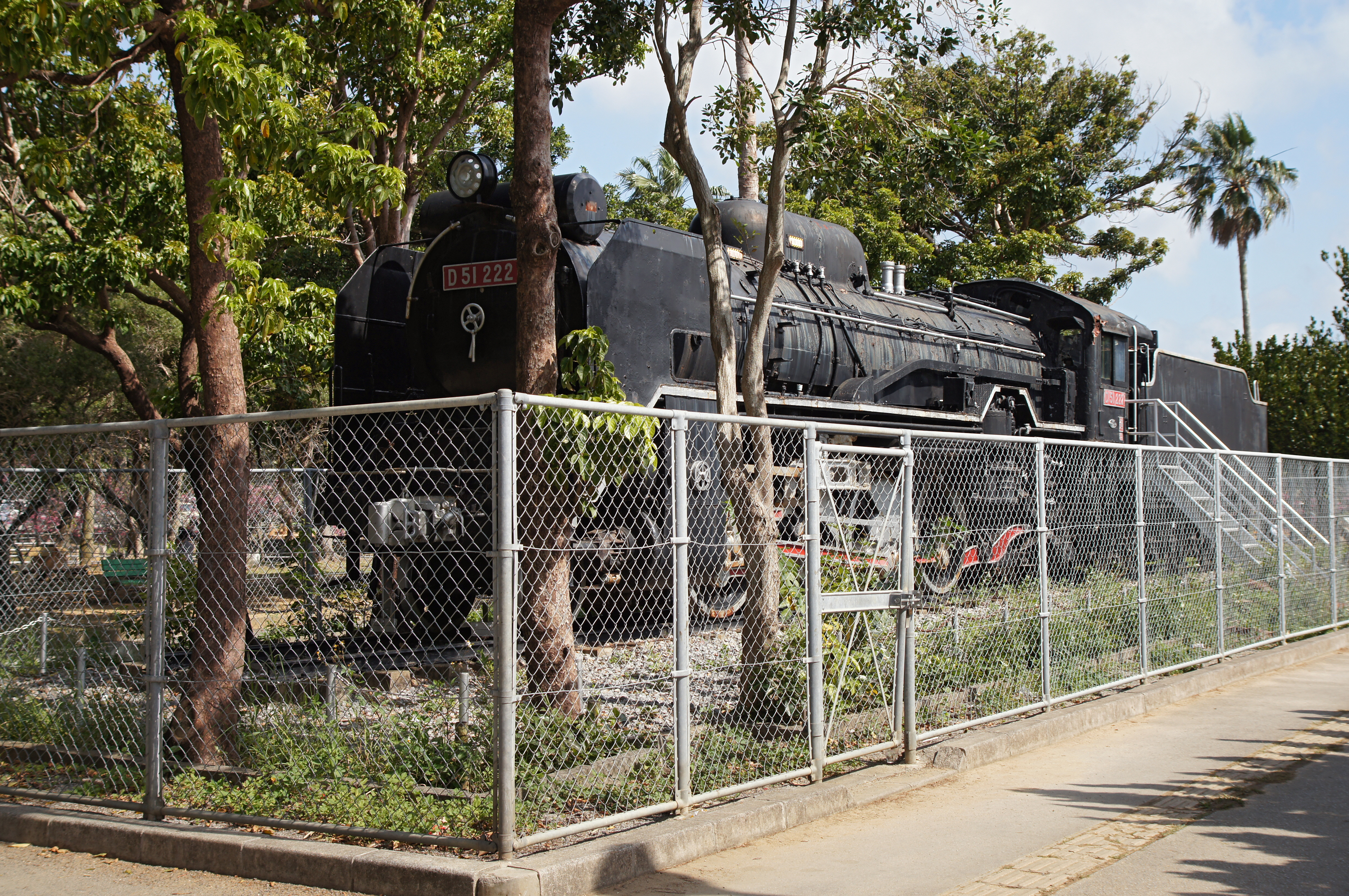
D51 222 in Yogi Park, Naha, Okinawa

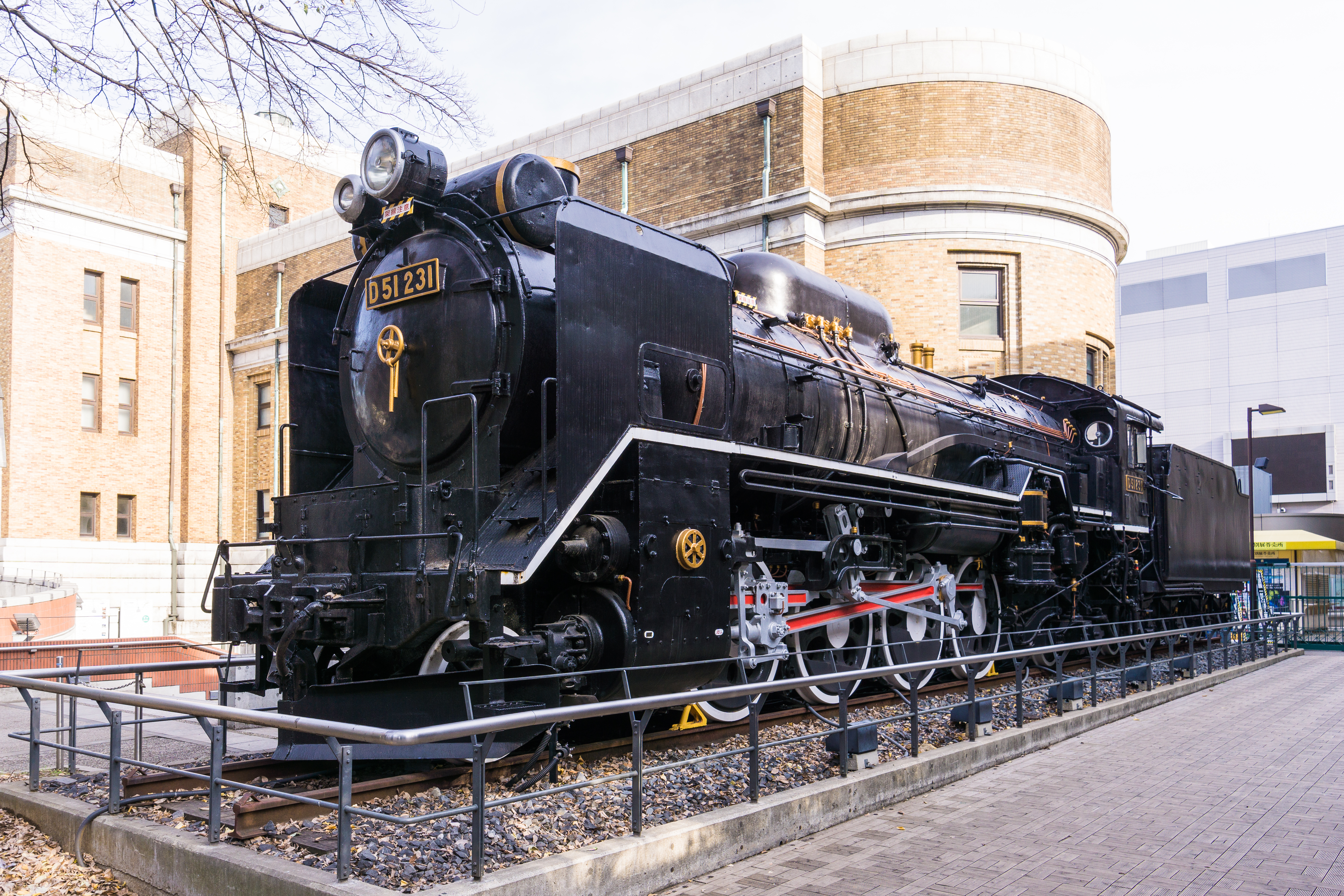
D51 231 outside the National Museum of Nature and Science in Tokyo in December 2014

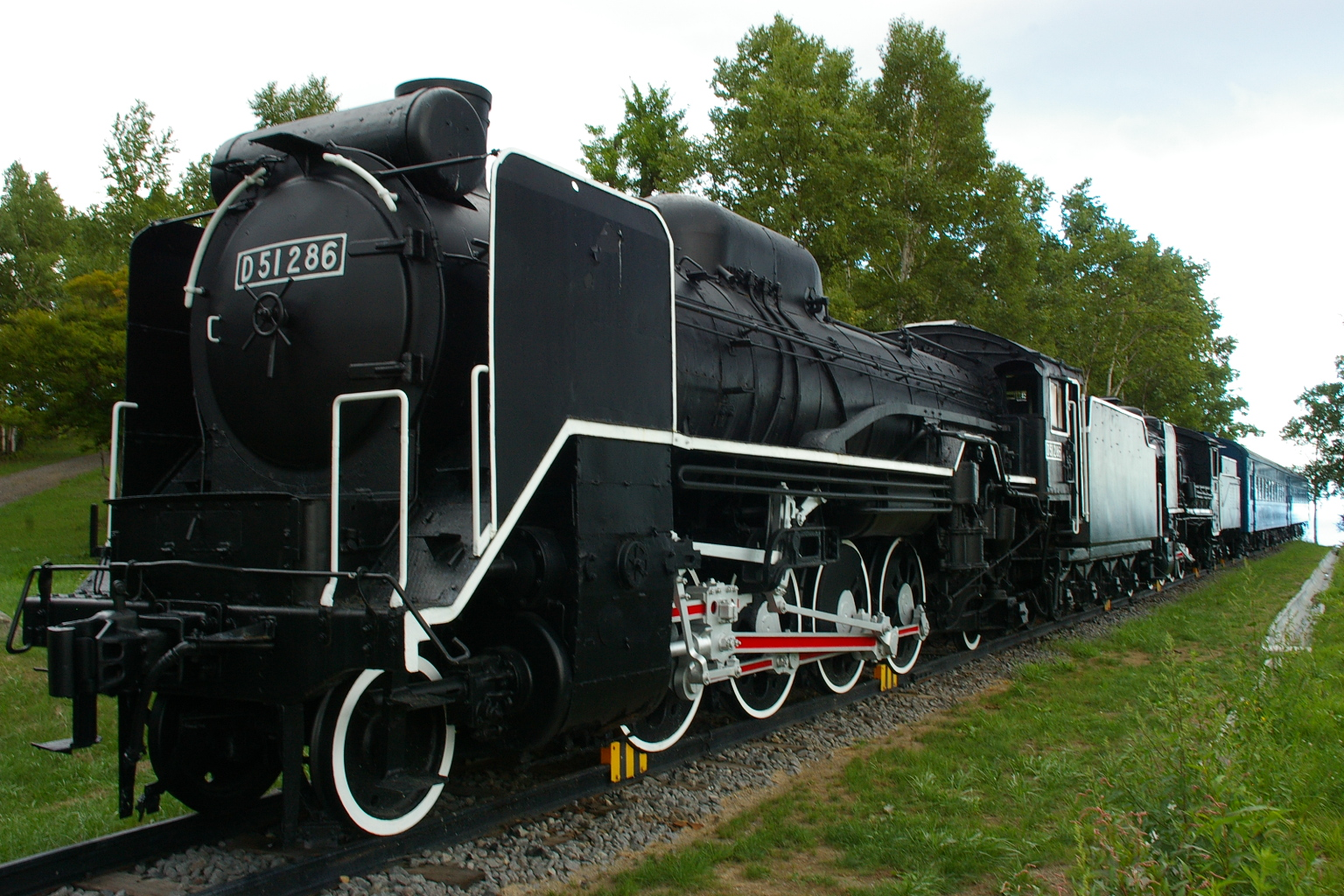
D51 286 in Otaru, Hokkaido

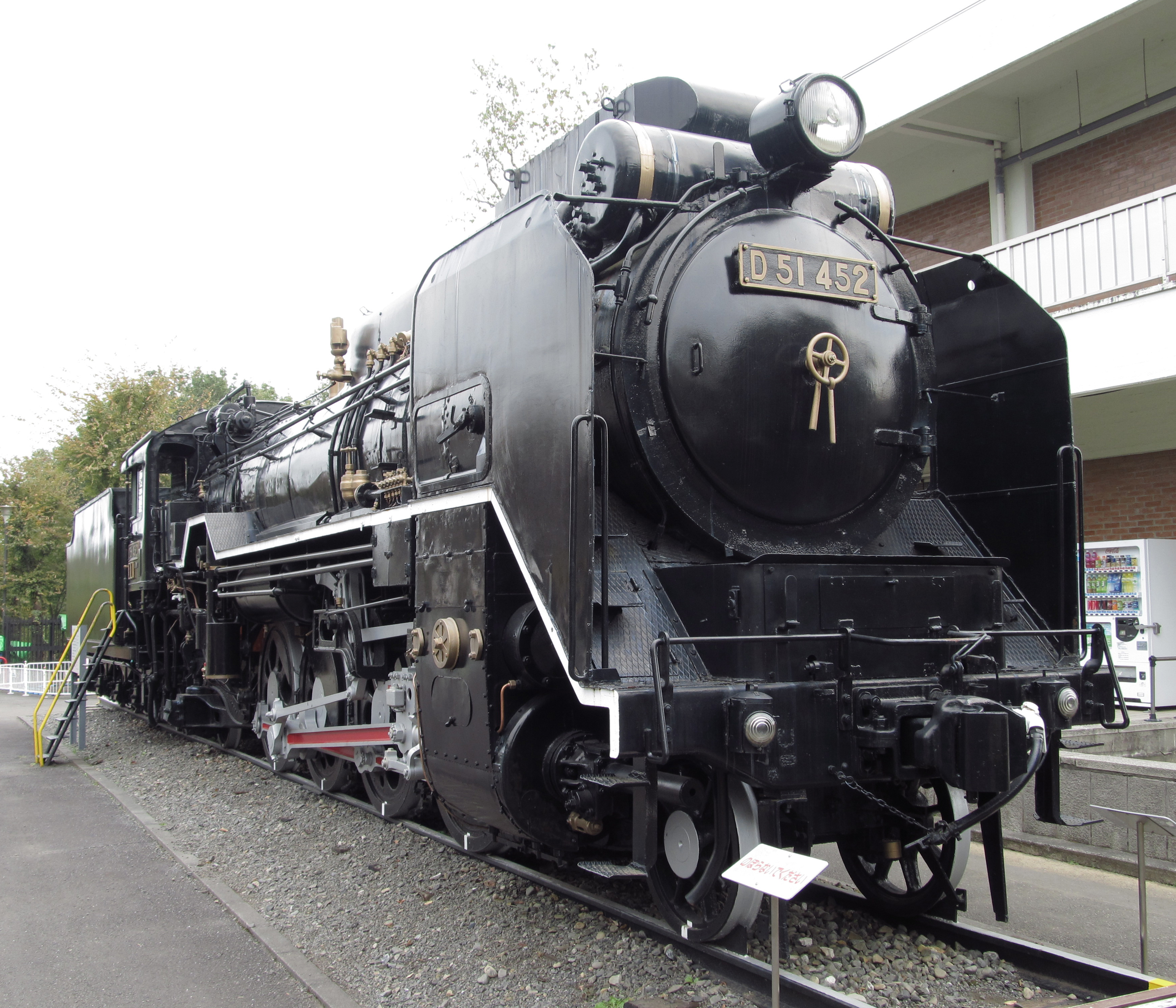
D51 452 at Ome Railway Park in Tokyo

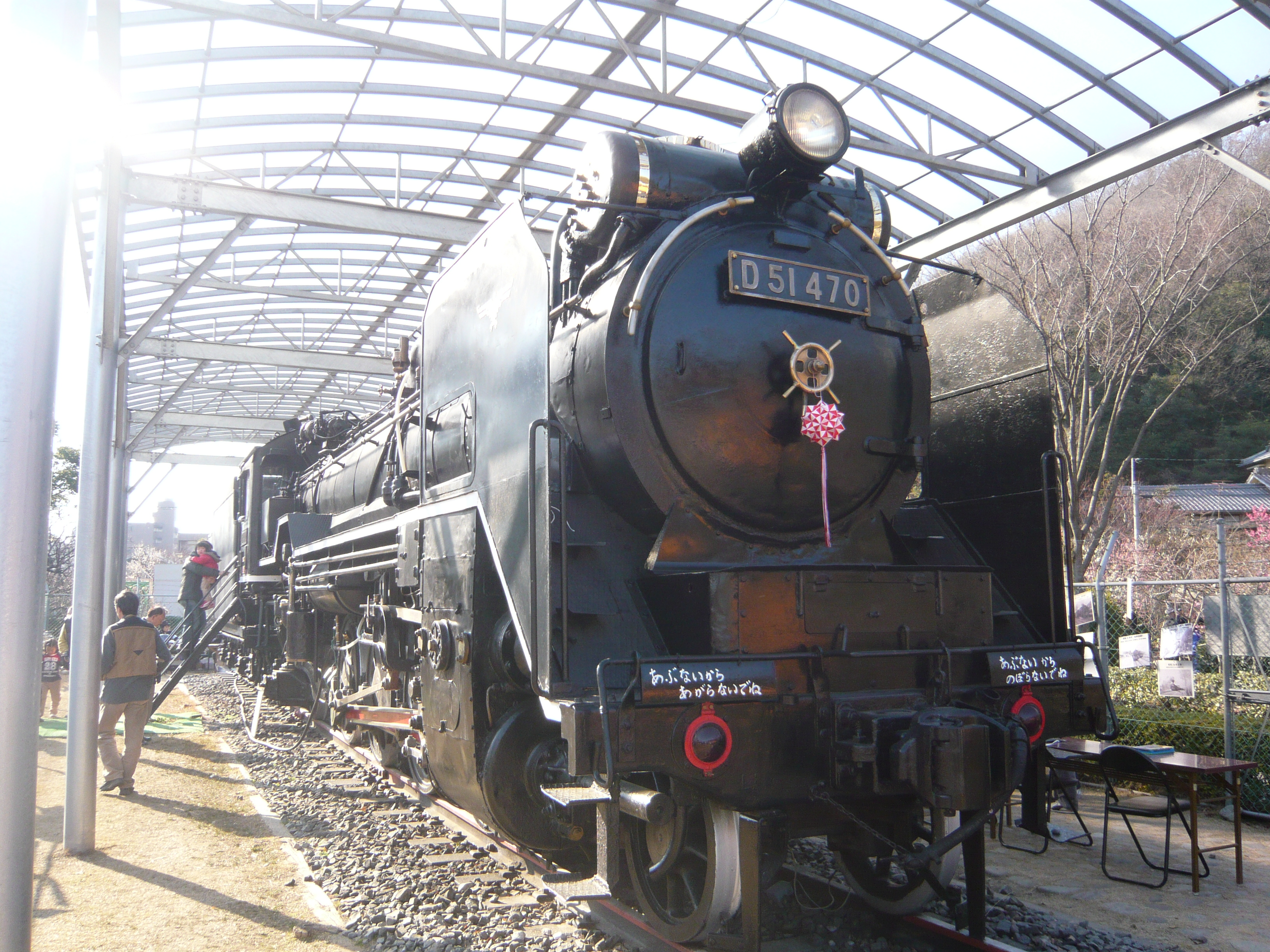
D51 470 in Gifu

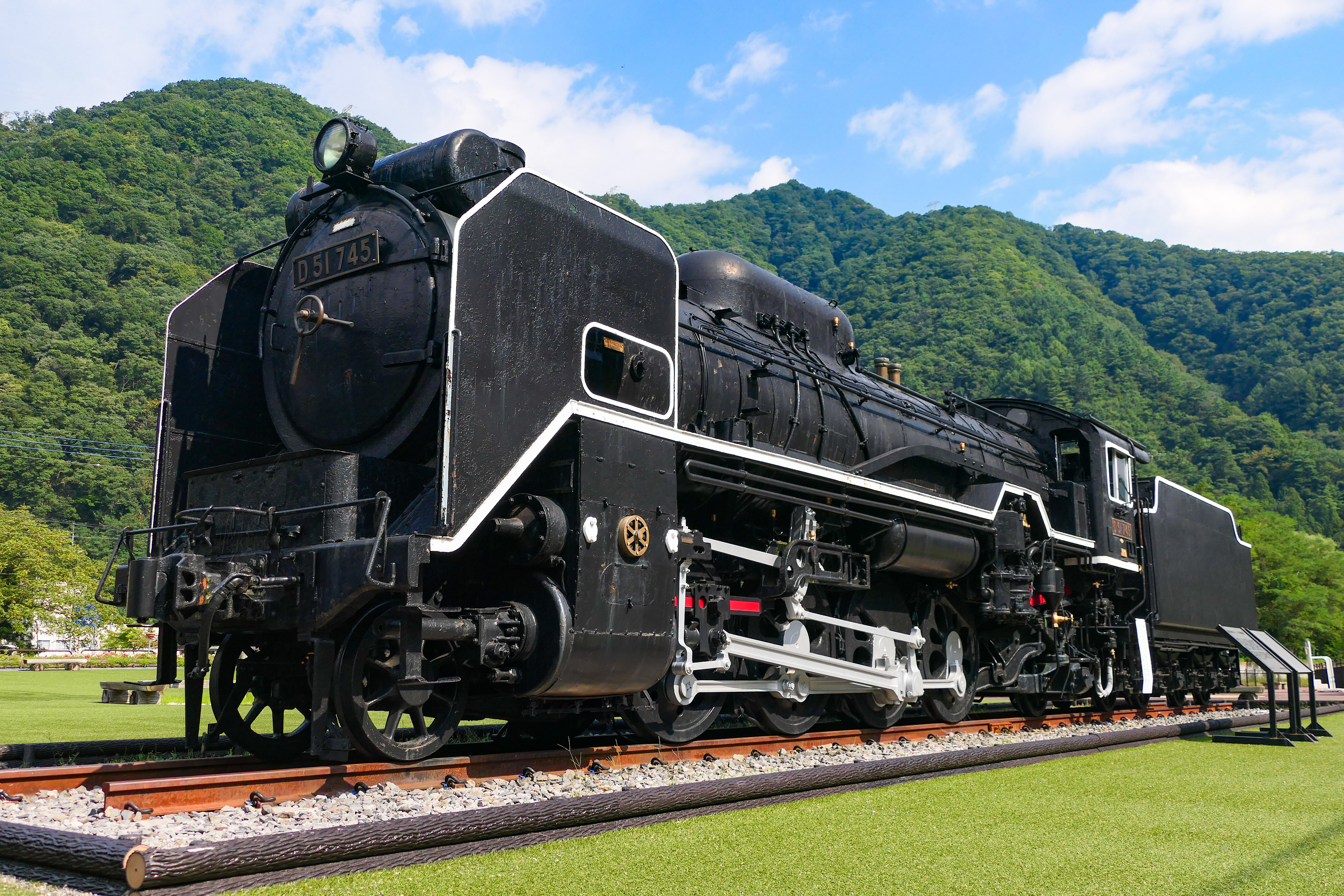
D51 745 in front of Minakami Station in September 2024

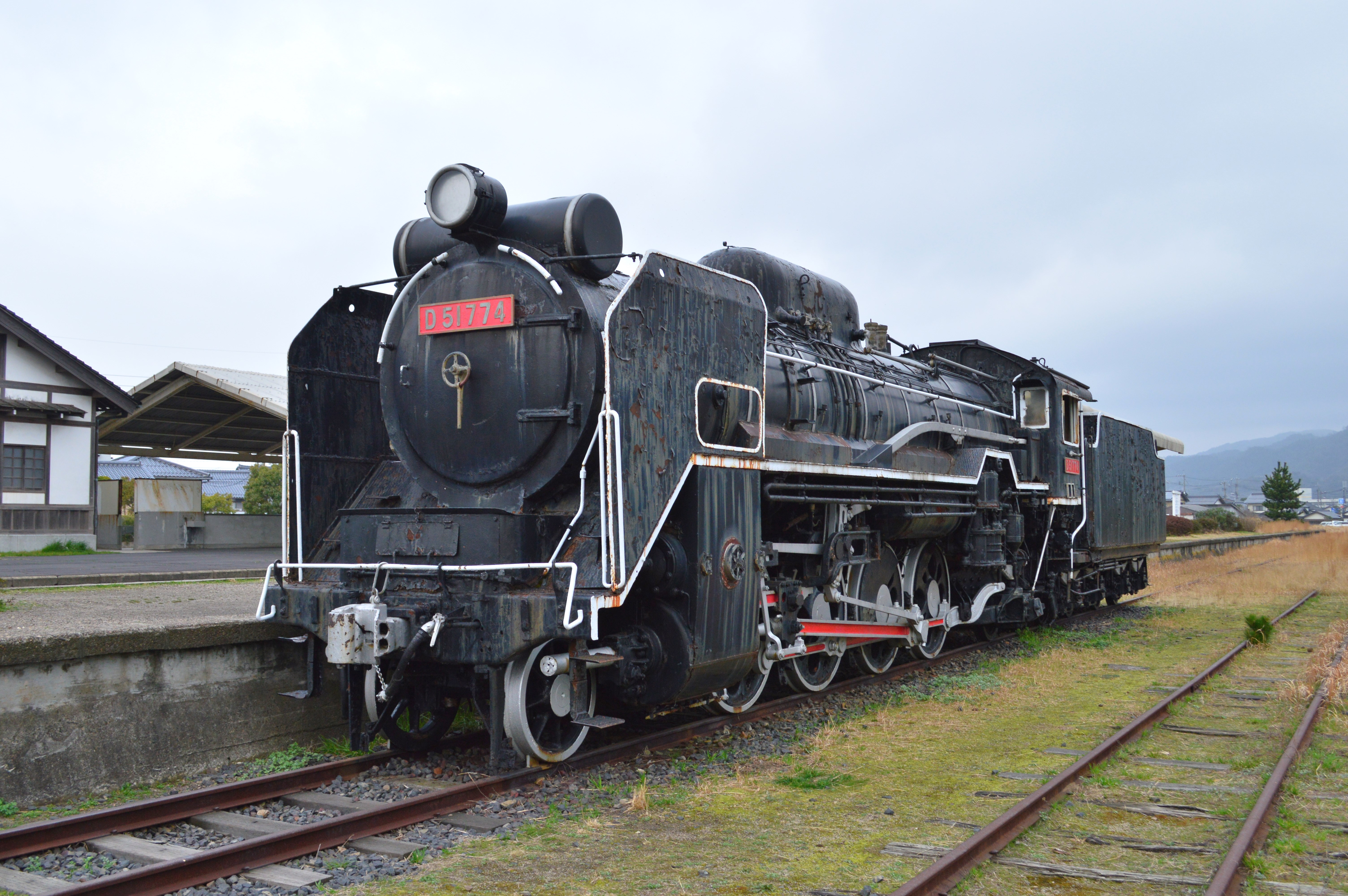
D51 774 next to the former Taisha Station in Izumo in March 2016

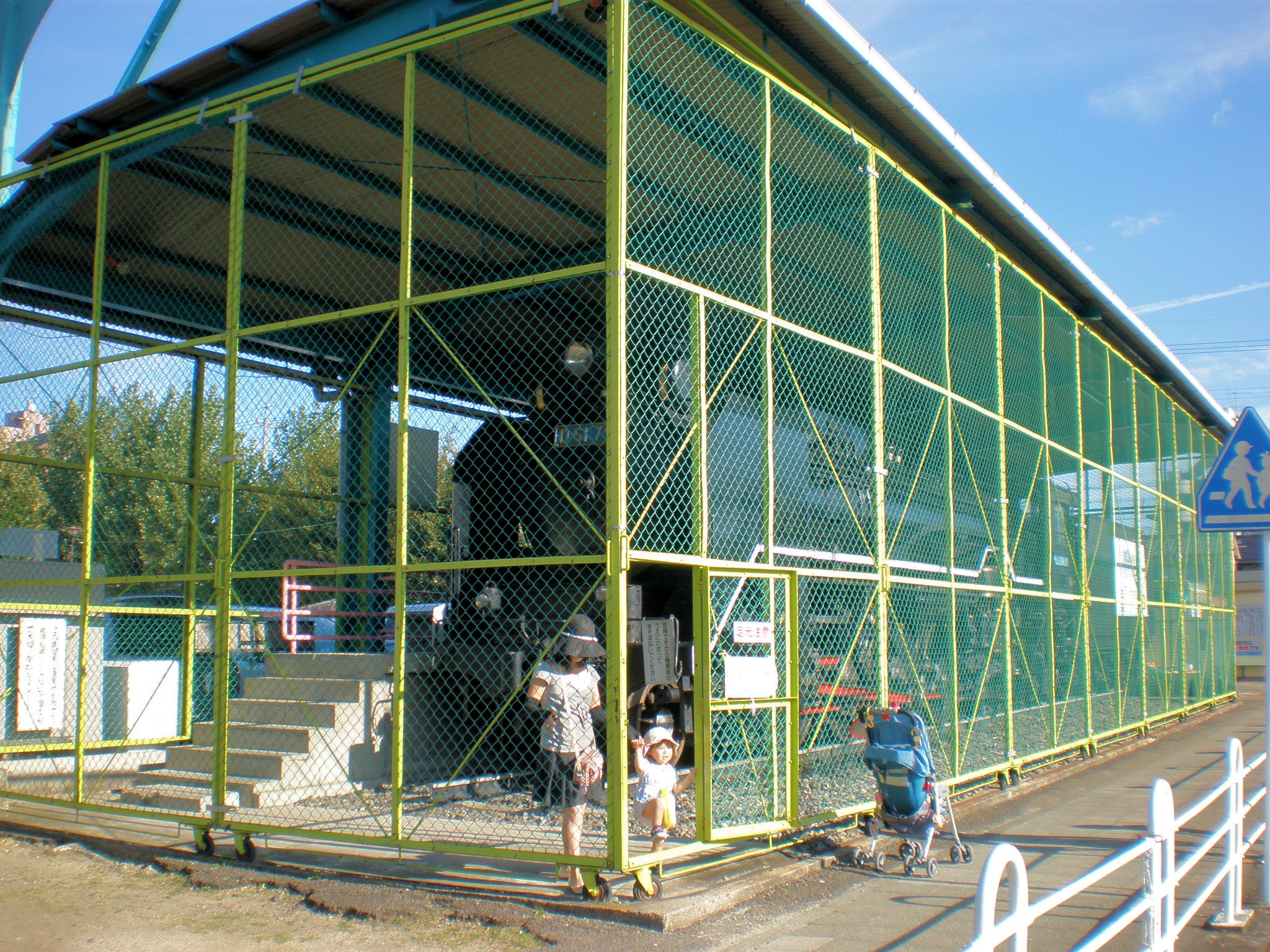
D51 792 in Kasugai, Aichi

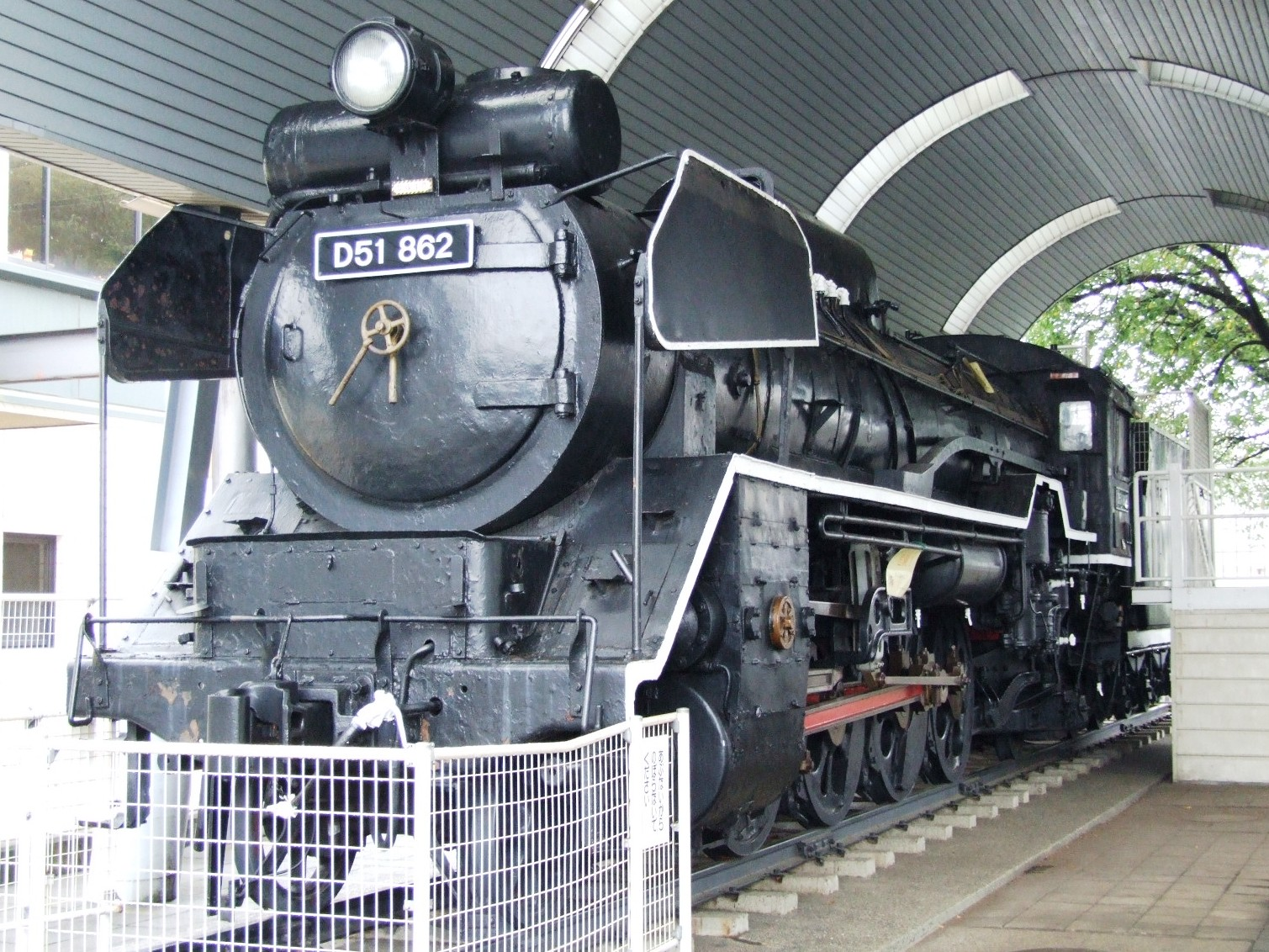
D51 862 in Machida, Tokyo

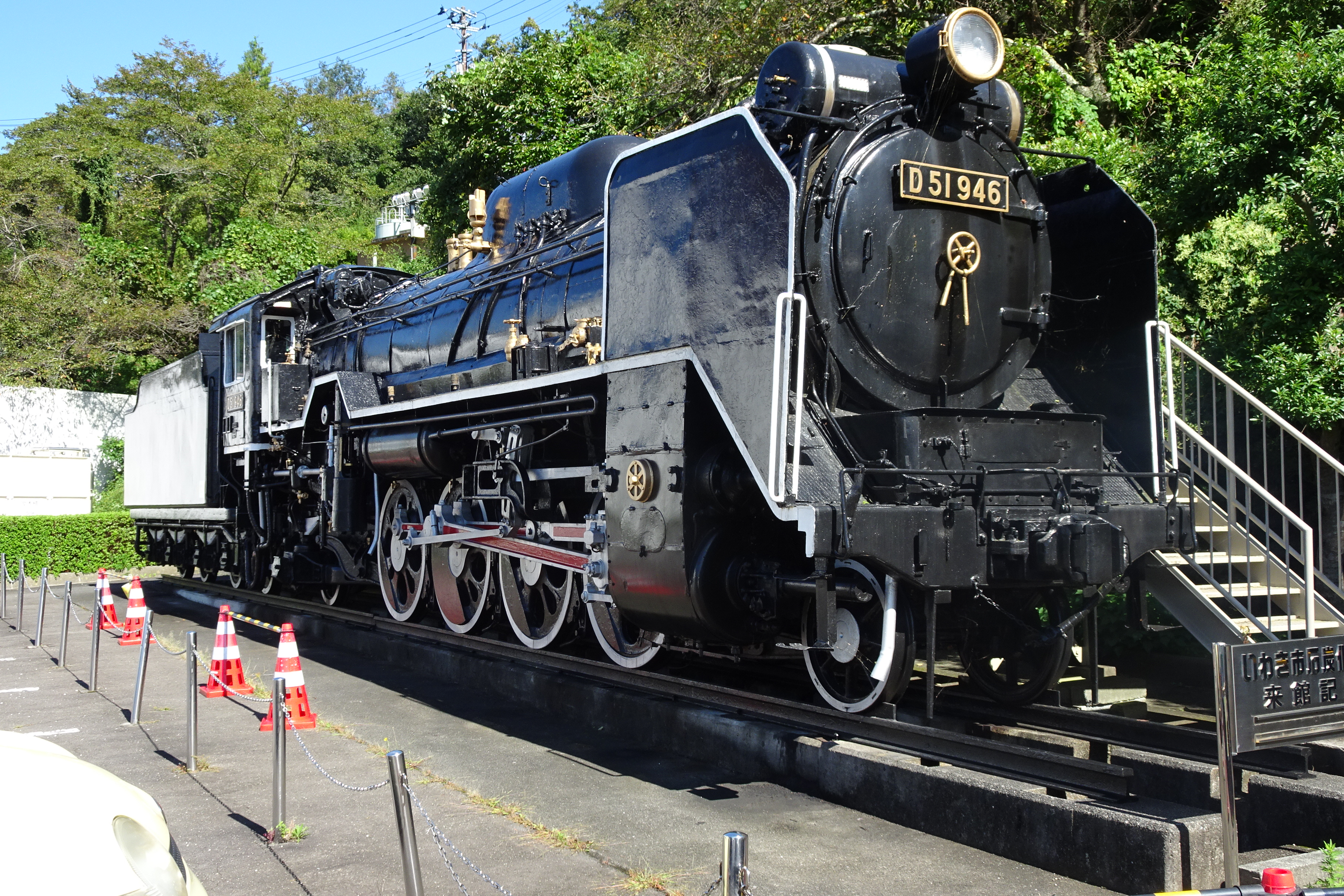
D51 946 at the Coal and Fossils Museum in Iwaki, Fukushima

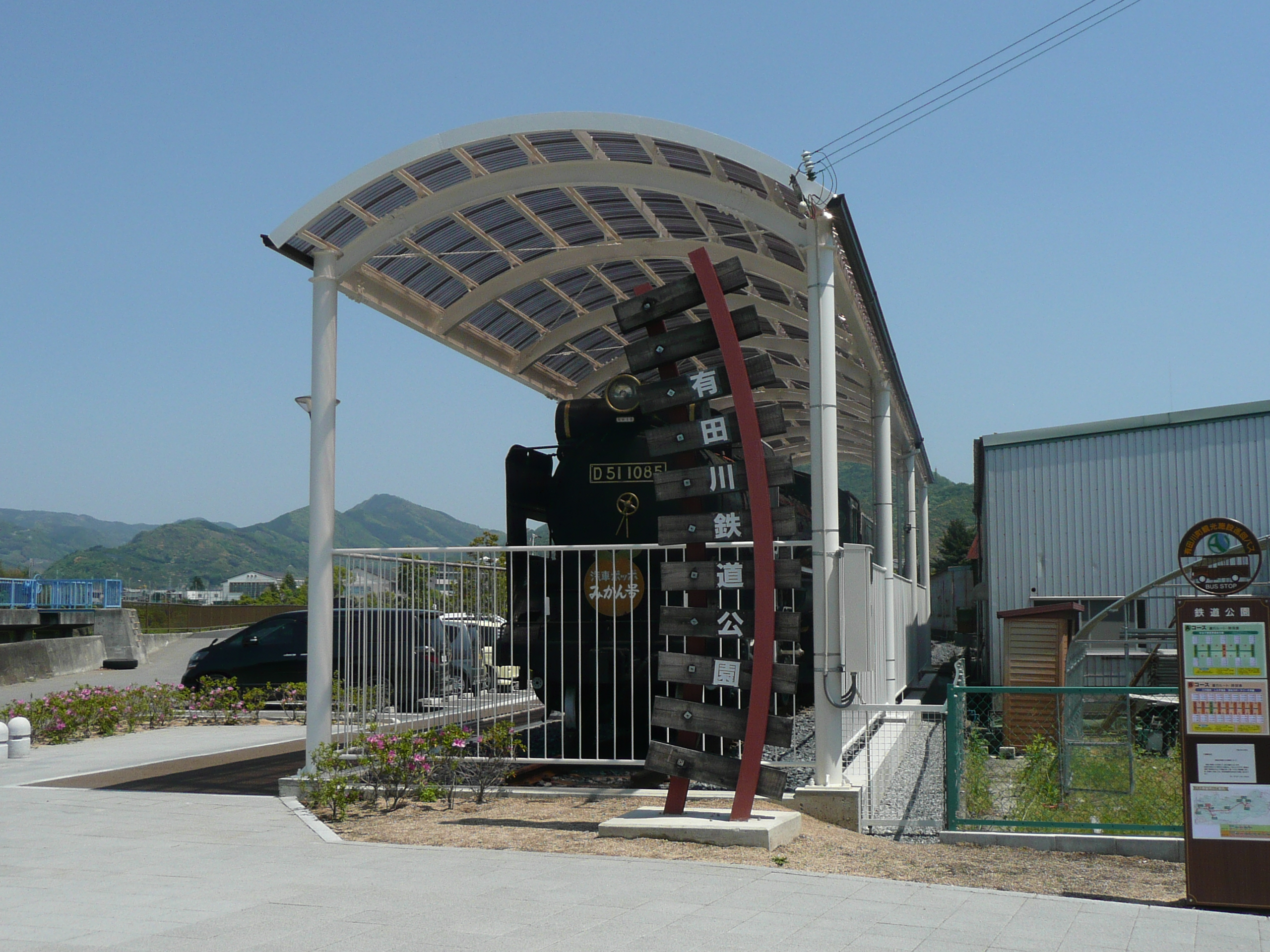
D51 1085 in Aridagawa, Wakayama

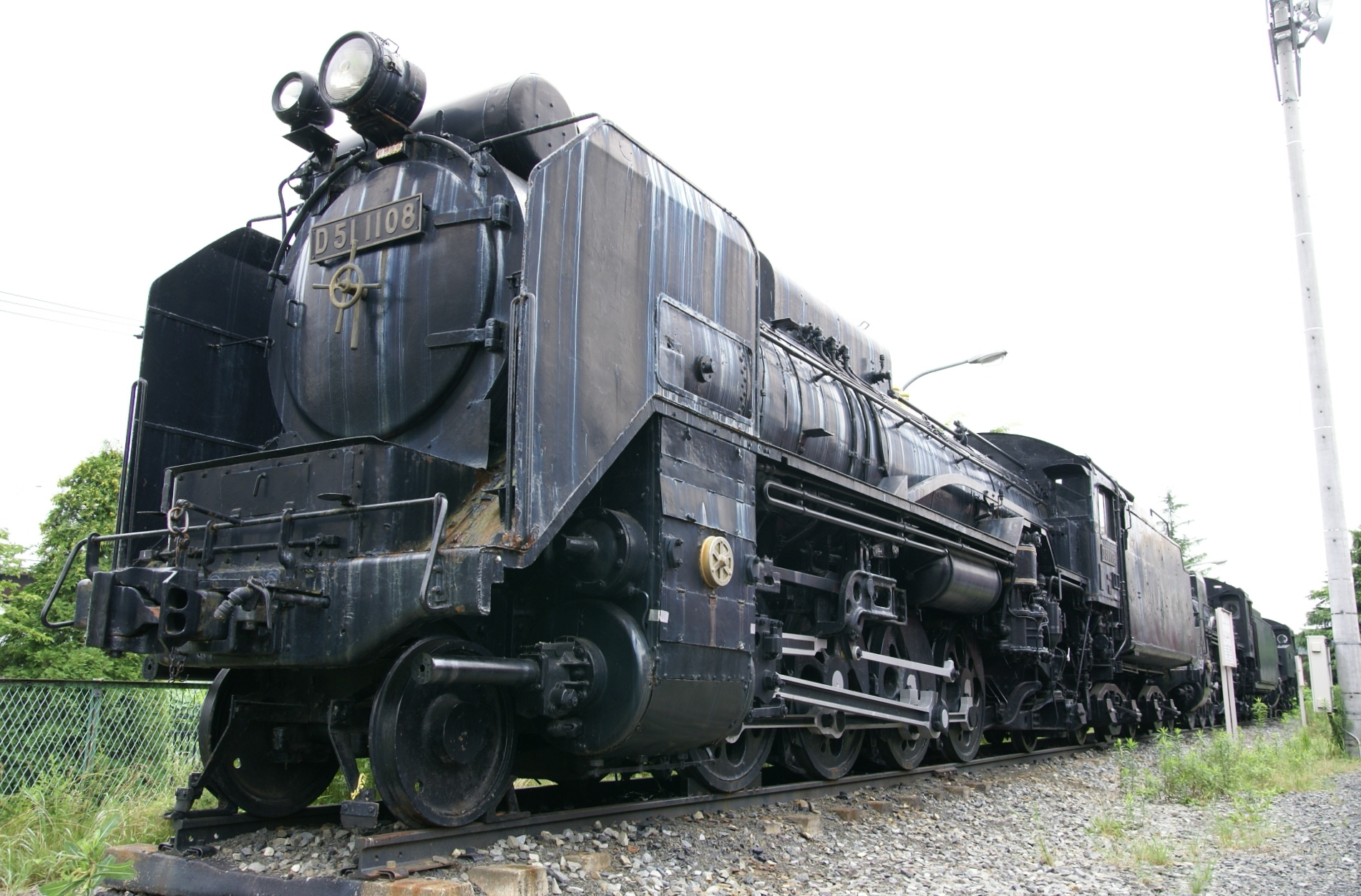
D51 1108 at Sendai Shinkansen Depot in July 2008

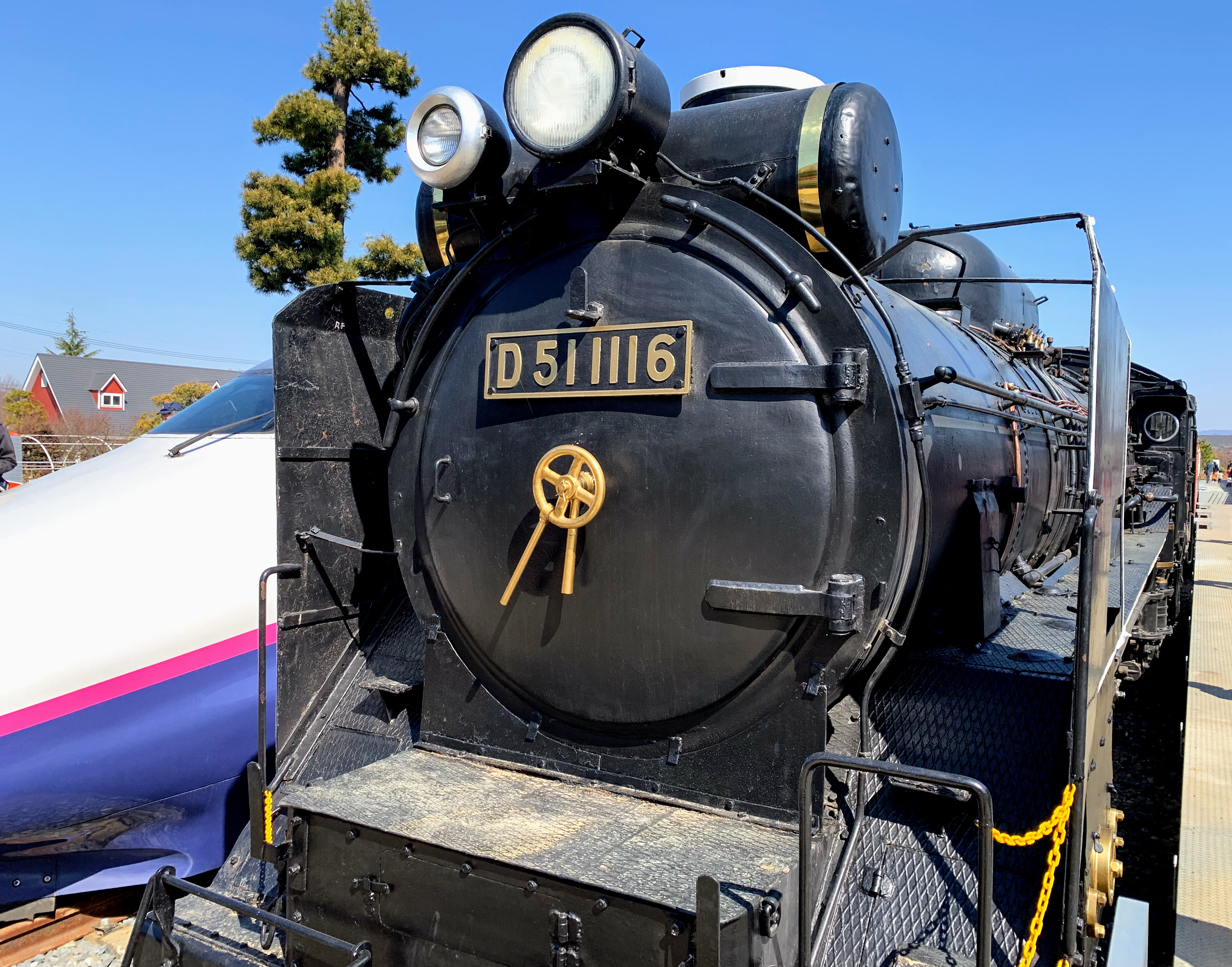
D51 1116 at The Hirosawa City in Chikusei, Ibaraki

== See also ==
- List of operational steam locomotives in Japan
- JNR Class D50
- JNR Class D52
