= JNR Class 9600 =

Japanese type 2-8-0 steam locomotive class

JNR Class 9600 Taiwan Railways Class DT580 China Railways Class KD5/KD55 Vietnam Railways Class KD5 North China Transport Soriko class (ソリコ) Central China Railway Class 9600
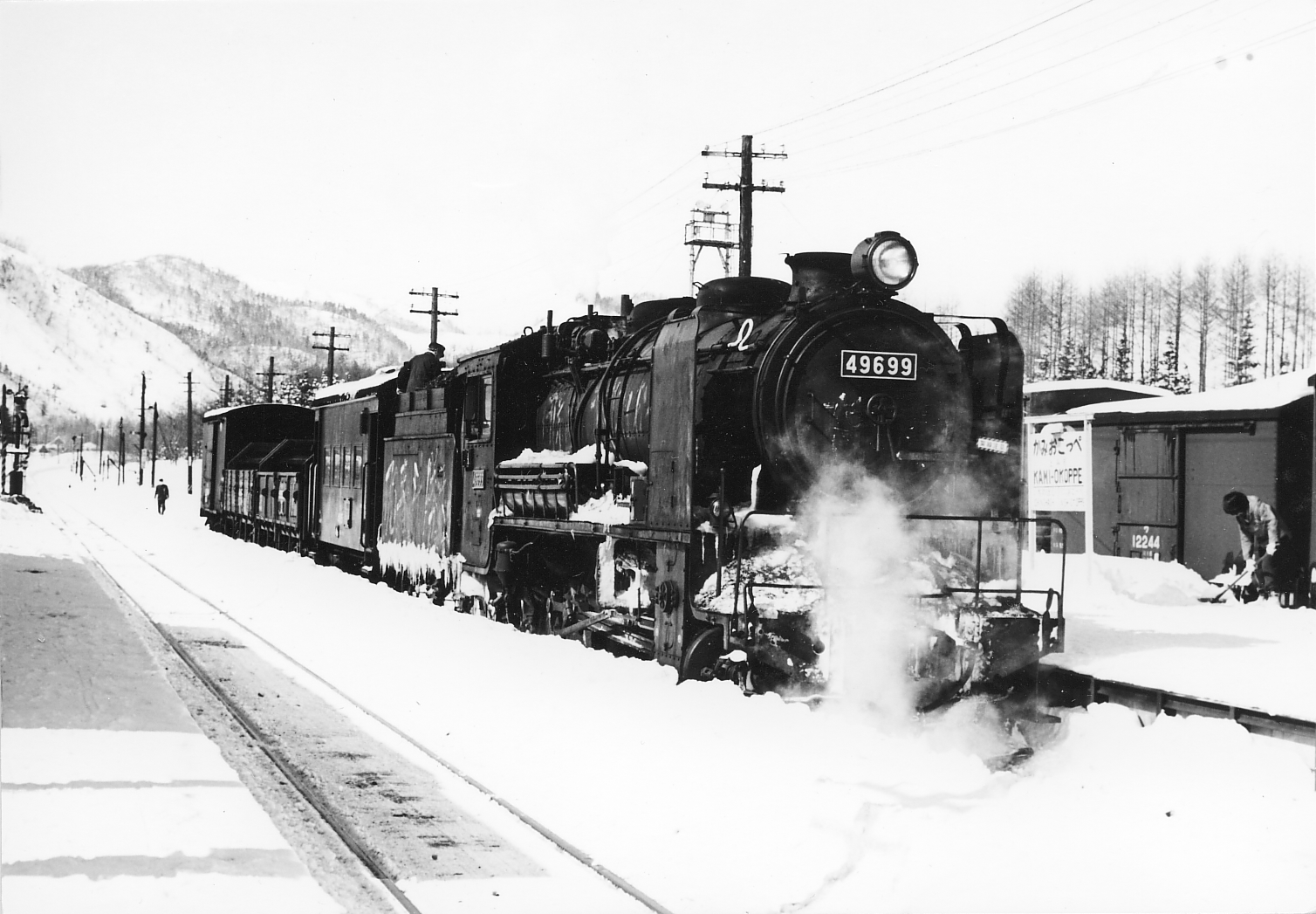
- 49699 in service in March 1973
Type and origin
- Power type: Steam
- Builder: Kawasaki Heavy Industries Rolling Stock Company, Kisha Seizō, JNR - Kokura
- Build date: 1913-1925
- Total produced: 770
Specifications
- Configuration
  - Whyte: 2-8-0
- Gauge: 1,000 mm (3 ft 3 3/8 in) (Chinese Railways KD55, Vietnam Railways KD5); 1,067 mm (3 ft 6 in) (JNR Class 9600, Taiwan Railways Administration DT580 Class); 1,435 mm (4 ft 8 1/2 in) (Chinese Railways KD5)
- Leading dia.: 840 mm (2 ft 9 in)
- Driver dia.: 1,250 mm (4 ft 1 in)
- Wheelbase: 7.01 m (23 ft 0 in)
- Length: 16.563 m (54 ft 4.1 in)
- Loco weight: 60.35 t (66.52 short tons; 59.40 long tons)
- Total weight: 94.85 t (104.55 short tons; 93.35 long tons)
- Fuel type: Coal
- Fuel capacity: 6 t (6.6 short tons; 5.9 long tons)
- Water cap.: 13 m^{3} (3,434 US gal)
- Firebox
  - Grate area: 2.32 m^{2} (25 sq ft)
- Boiler pressure: 13 kg/cm^{2} (180 lbf/in^{2})
- Heating surface: 154.5 m^{2} (1,663 sq ft)
- Superheater
  - Heating area: 35.2 m^{2} (379 sq ft)
- Cylinders: Two, outside
- Cylinder size: 50.8 cm × 61 cm (20 in × 24 in)
- Valve gear: Inverted Walschaerts
Performance figures
- Maximum speed: 65 km/h (40 mph)
- Tractive effort: 14,200 kgf (139 kN; 31,000 lbf)
Career
- Numbers: 9600-9699, 19600-19699, 29600-29699, 39600-39699, 49600-49699, 59600-59699, 69600-69699, 79600-79669
- Locale: All of Japan, except Ryukyu Islands
- Retired: 1976
- Preserved: 43
- Disposition: 43 preserved, remainder scrapped

The Class 9600 (9600形) are a type of 2-8-0 "Consolidation" steam locomotives built by Japanese Government Railways (JGR, after-day Japanese National Railways (JNR)) from 1913 to 1925. They were the first locomotive class to be mass-produced by Japanese manufacturers. The Class 9600 were popularly known as Kyuroku (nine-six), and were extensively used for freight service throughout Japan.
They were numbered 9600-9699, 19600-19699, 29600-29699, 39600-39699, 49600-49699, 59600-59699, 69600-69699 and 79600-79669. All 770 remained in service before they were gradually withdrawn until the 2nd of March 1976, when all steam-hauled service on JNR's network has been phased out.

== Service outside Japan ==
=== Taiwan Railways Administration DT580 ===
From 1923 to 1939, Kawasaki, Kisha Seizō, Nippon Sharyō, and Hitachi built 39 9600s for the Government General of Taiwan. The Taiwan Government Railway classified them 800 class before 1937, and they were classified D98 after 1937. After World War II, they were taken over by Taiwan Railways Administration, and they were classified DT580. One engine, DT619, is being rebuilt by combining parts of scrapped locomotives after the war.

=== Class KD5/KD55 ===
To alleviate a severe motive power shortage on the Central China Railway, JNR locomotives were converted from Japanese narrow gauge to standard gauge and shipped to China. 251 Class 9600 locomotives were sent for use on both the Central China Railway and the North China Transportation Company (NCTC class ソリコ (Soriko)); after the Pacific War, these became China Railway class KD5.

Others were rebuilt to metre gauge for operation on Yunnan's Kunming–Hekou Railway and its branches; these eventually became China Railway class KD55. A number of these locomotives were subsequently transferred to Vietnam Railways for cross-border operations and domestic service, until the class was officially retired in 1990.

== Preserved examples ==
As of April 2024, 43 Class 9600 locomotives are preserved at various locations in Japan. There had originally been 46 preserved, but over time 3 were scrapped due to neglect and high maintenance costs.

Number 39685, built in 1920, was preserved outdoors in Chuo-ku, Saitama since 1972, but was removed and scrapped in September 2016 due to the prohibitive cost of restoration.

Number 29657, built in 1919, had been preserved and used for the Morimon Onsen SL Land hotel in the Niigata Prefecture of Uonuma City in 1979. In 1998, the SL Hotel business was discontinued and the engine and consist were left as an outdoor public display. In 2015, it was abandoned after the Morimon Onsen Seiunkan closed in March of that year. One of the two passenger carriages was removed sometime before or during 2014. In 2022, 29657 and the last coach were scrapped on-site years later.

On April 22nd, 2024 number 19633, built in 1917, which was previously on display outdoors near the Wakamatsu Station in the Fukuoka Prefecture, Kitakyushu City since 1989, was scrapped after being exposed to the elements and neglected for many years with little cosmetic maintenance. It was believed to have been bought and thought to have been moved to its new location in 2020 near the Yamaguchi Yuya Fukutaro food corporation in Soeda Town, was scrapped

=== Taiwan ===
- DT609: Preserved at the Takao Railway Museum.
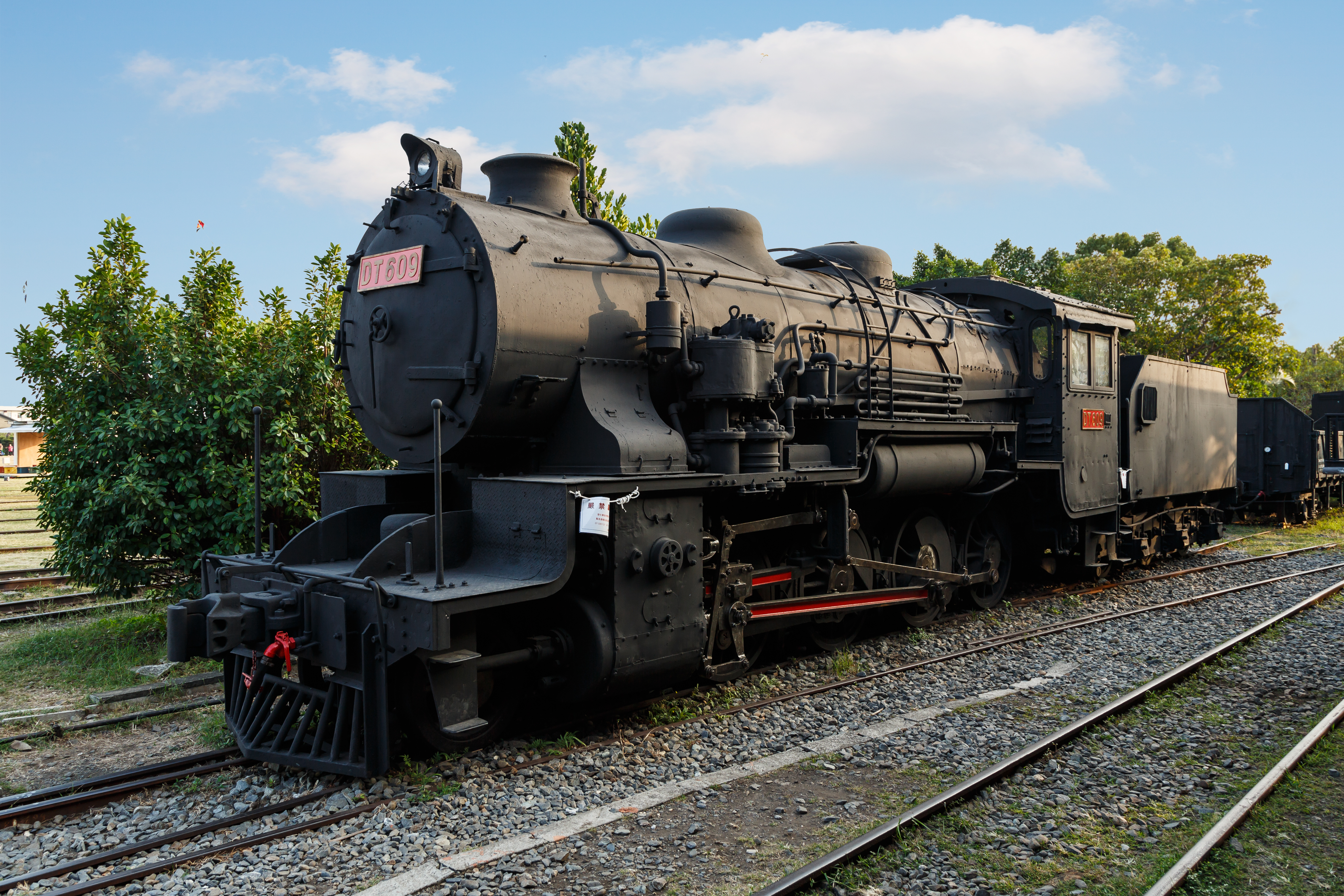
DT609, one of 39 locomotives of the DT580 Class (based on the 9600 Class steam locomotives from Japan) preserved in Kaohsiung, Taiwan

=== China ===
- KD5 373: Preserved at the China Railway Museum.
- KD55 579: Preserved at the China Railway Museum.
- KD55 583: Preserved at the Yunnan Railway Museum.
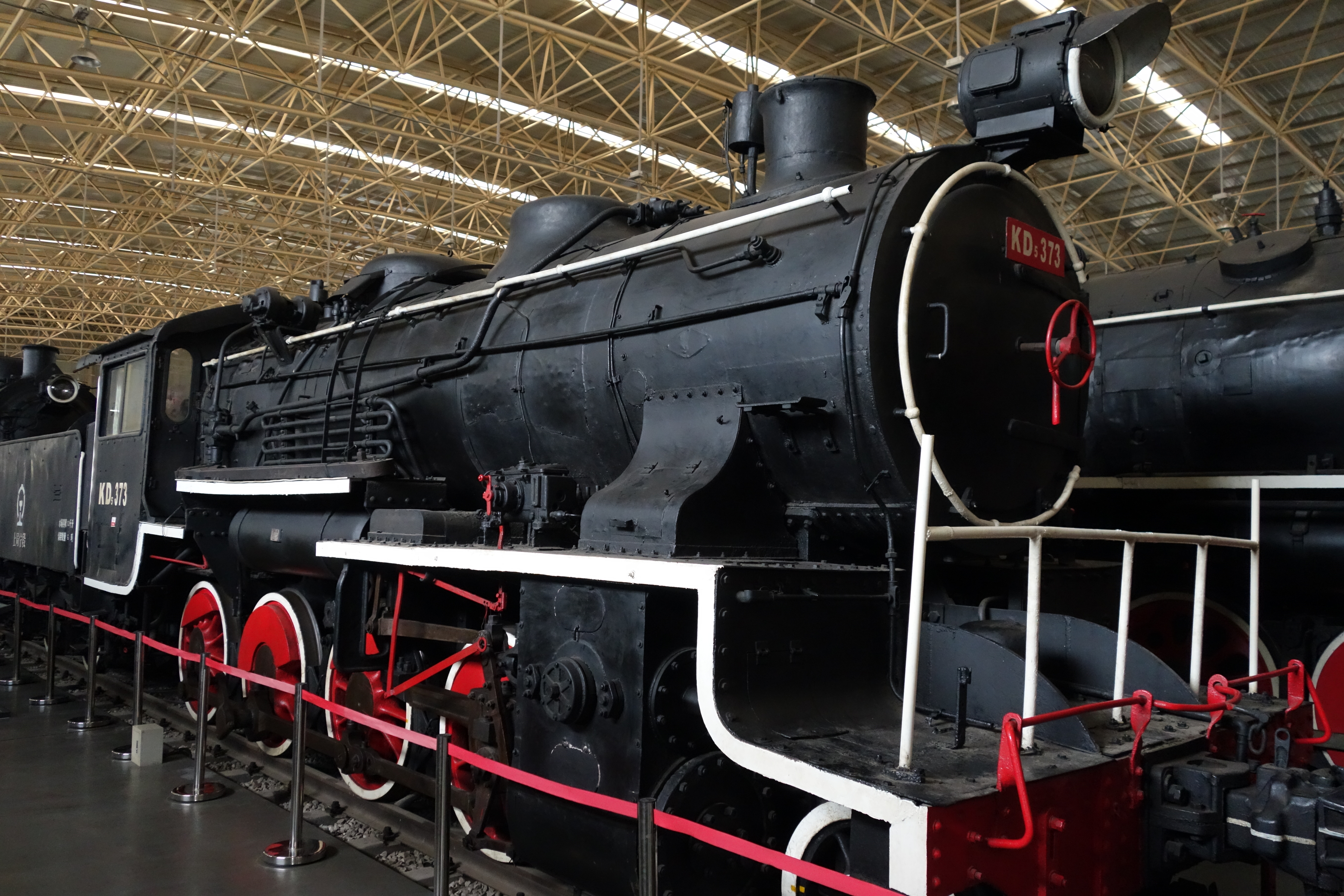
KD5-373 preserved at the China Railway Museum

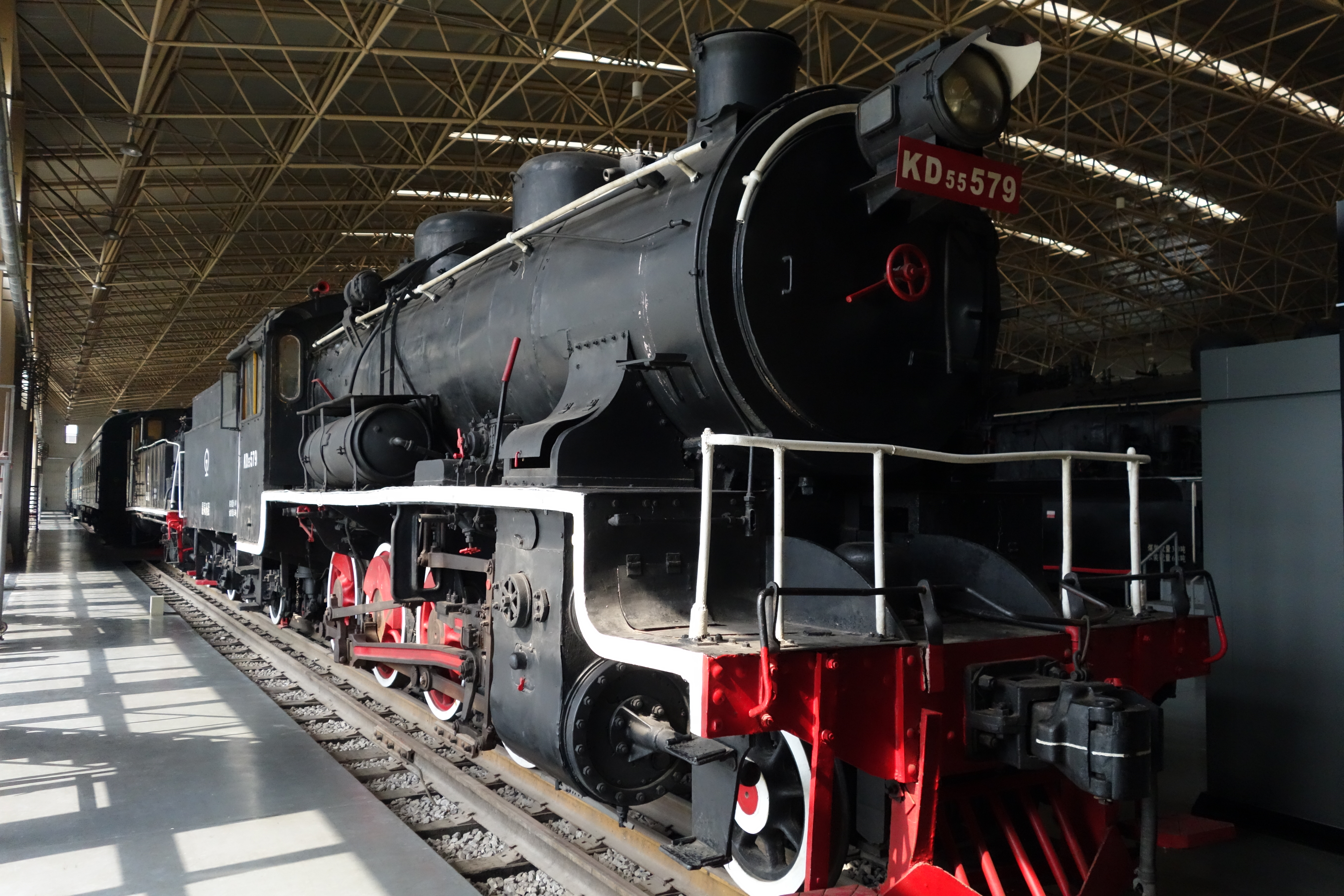
KD55-579 preserved at the China Railway Museum

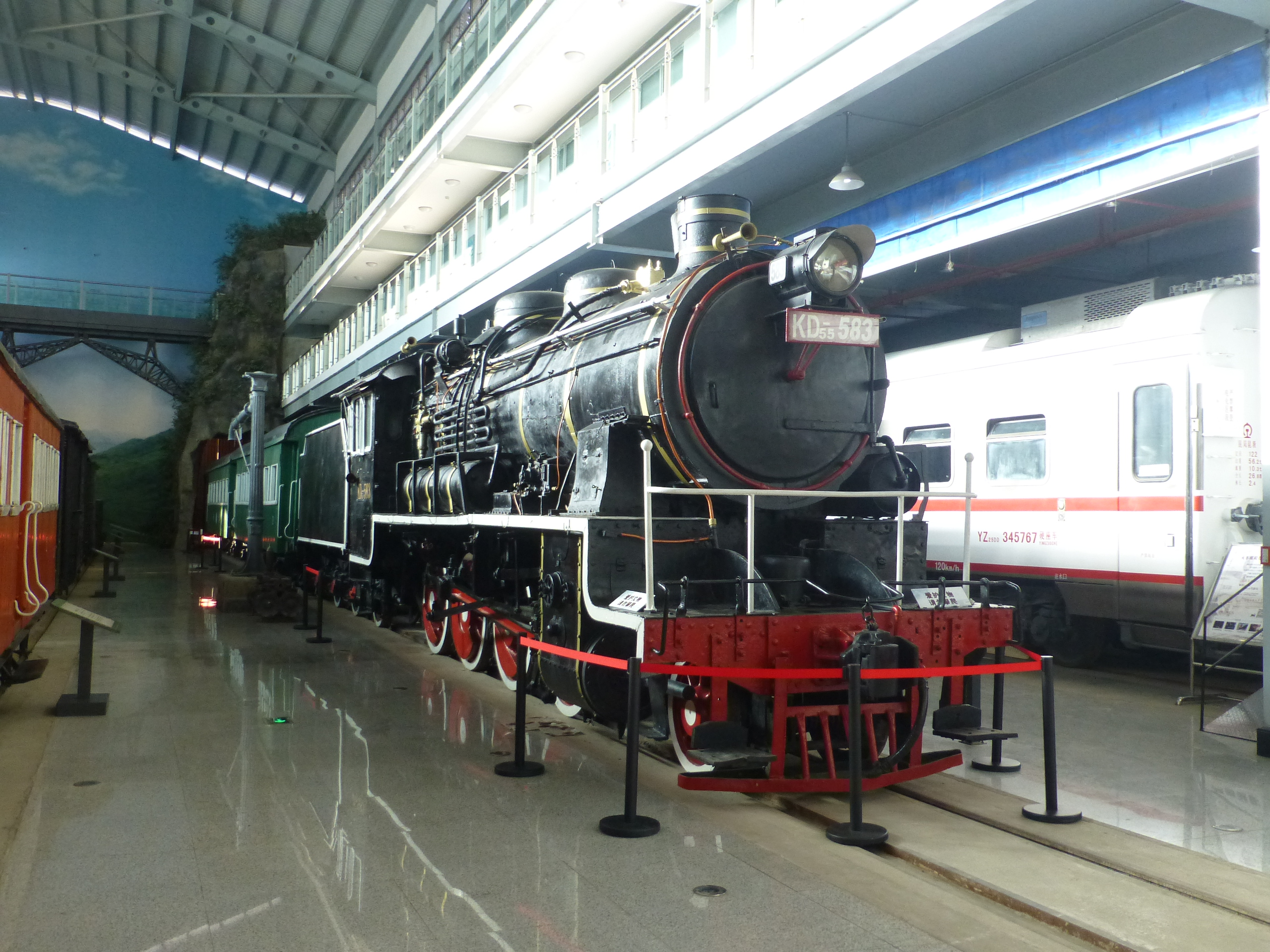
KD55-583 preserved at the Yunnan Railway Museum

=== Vietnam ===
- KD5 445: at Hà Nội Depot
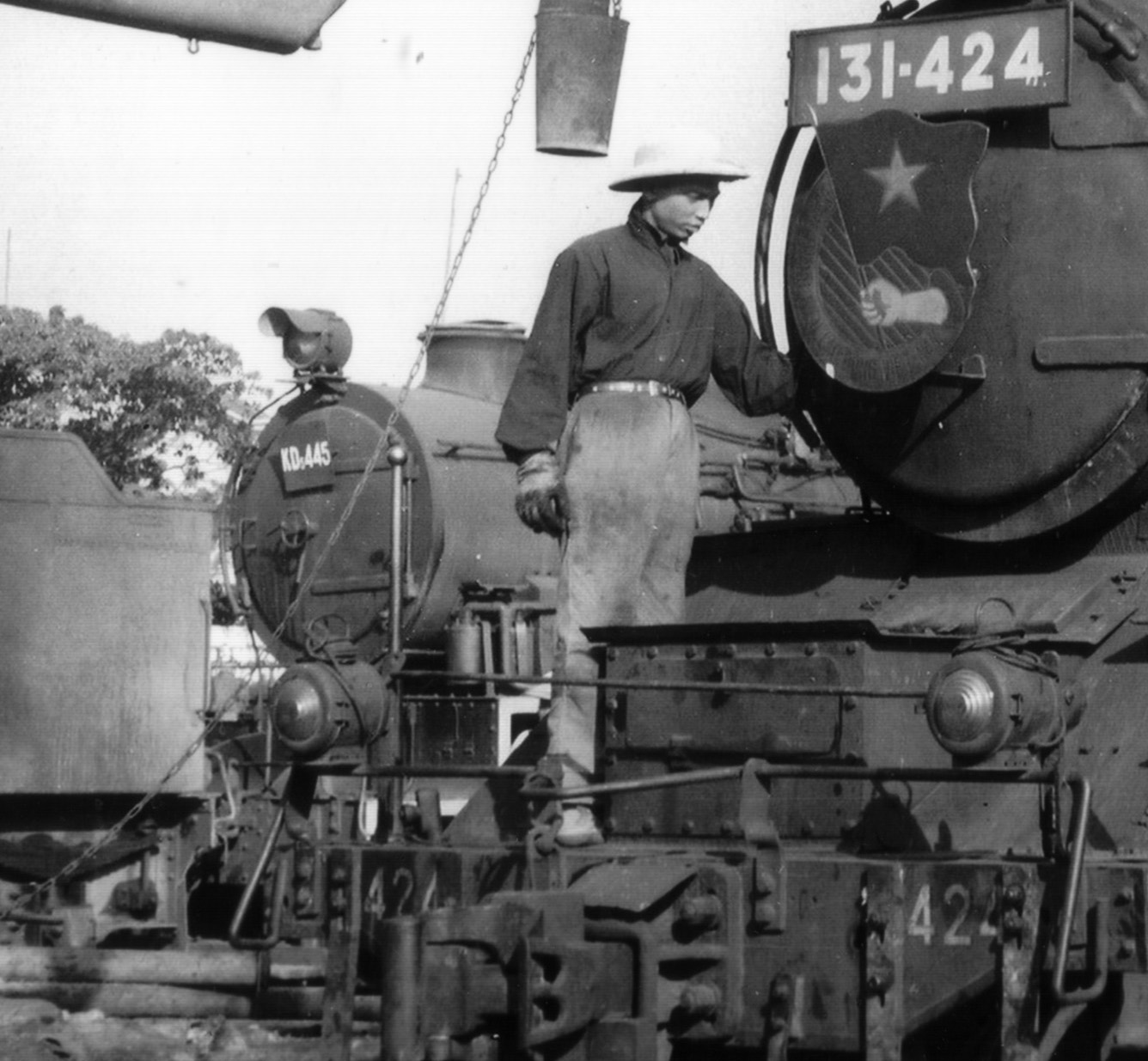
KD5-445 At The Hanoi Depot November 1962

=== Japan ===
The rest are all in Japan.

Number 29612 was moved from Shime, Fukuoka Prefecture in 2015 to be preserved at Bungo-Mori Roundhouse in Kusu, Oita Prefecture.

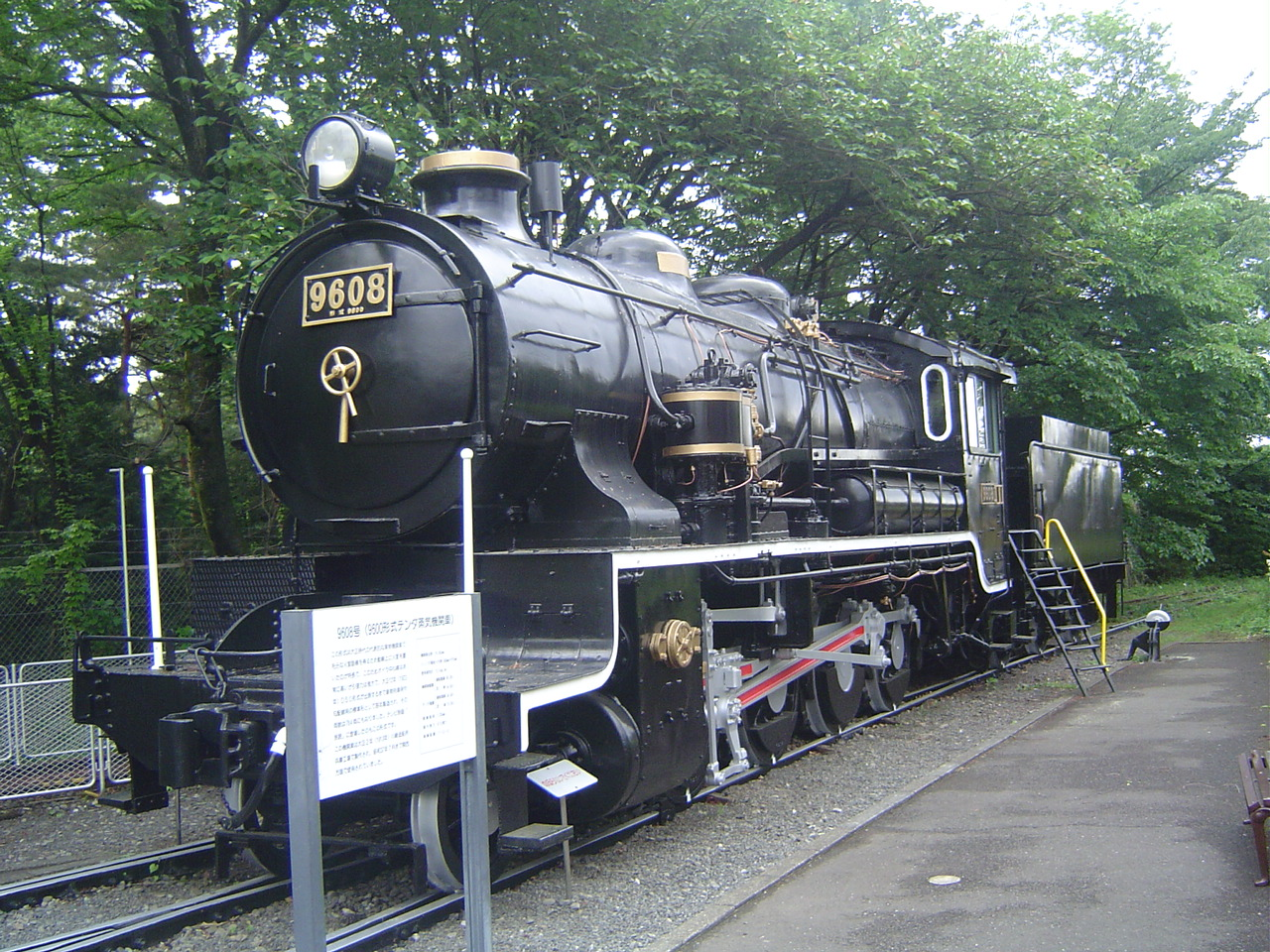
9608 preserved at Ome Railway Park

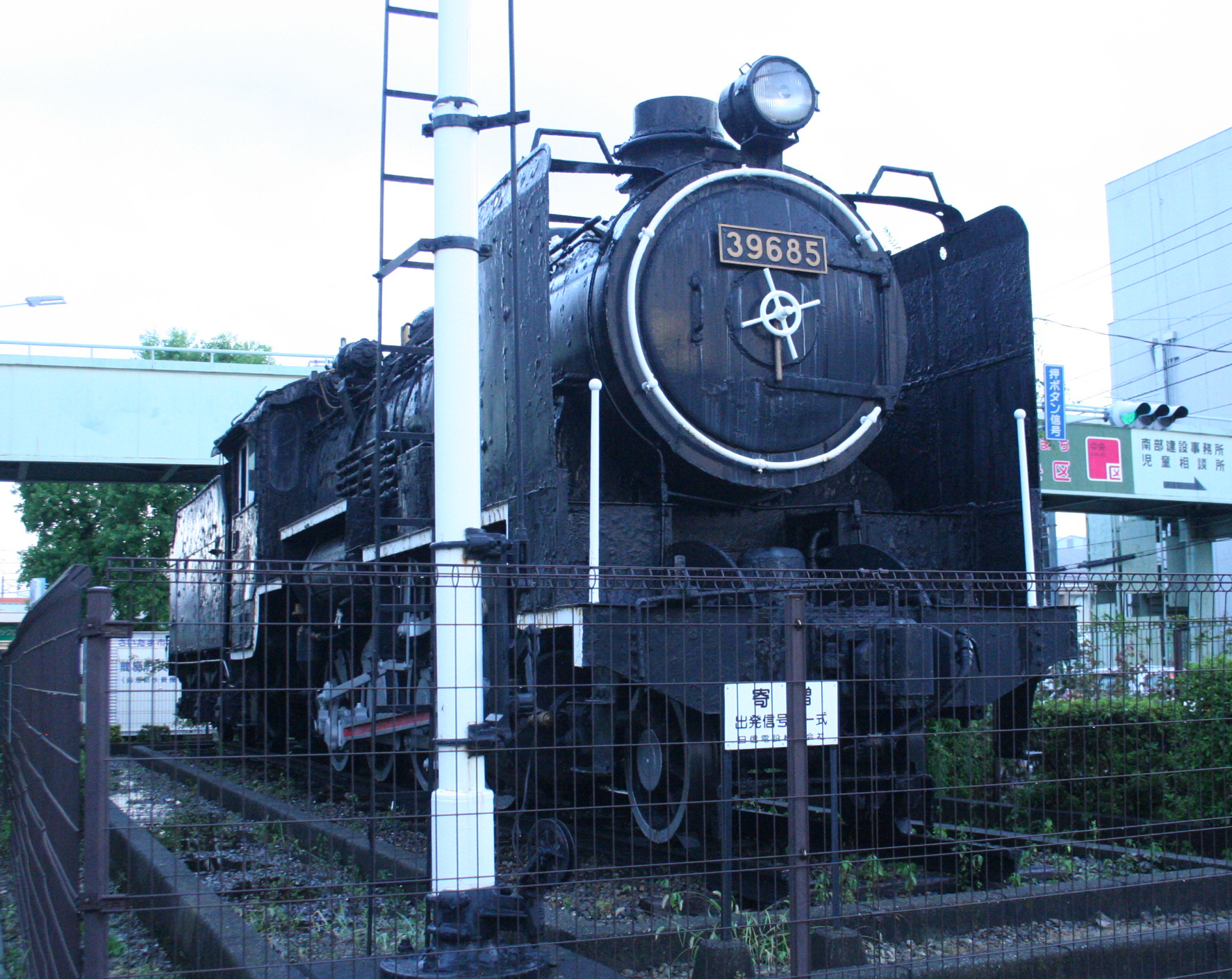
39685 preserved in Saitama

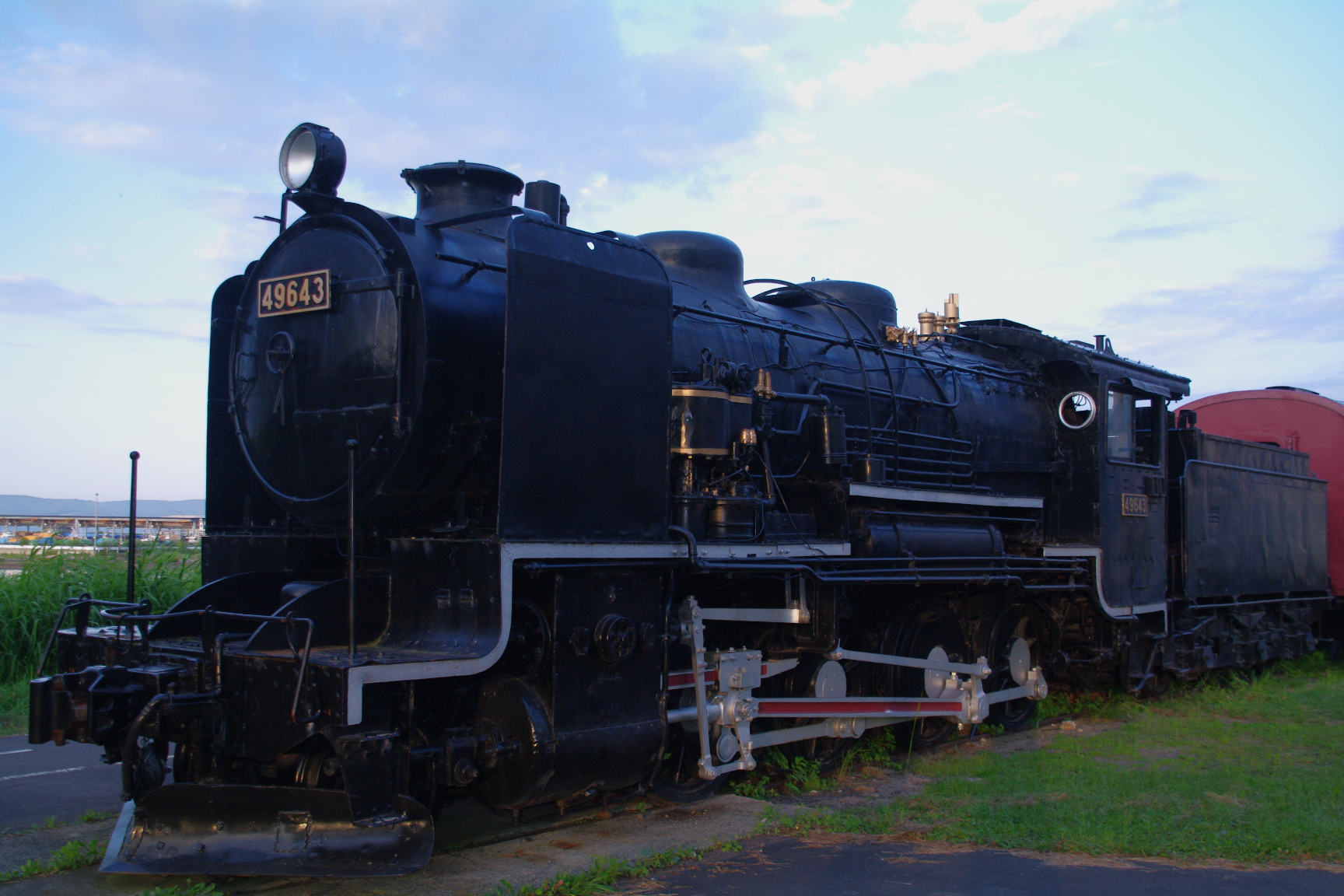
49643 preserved in Abashiri, Hokkaido

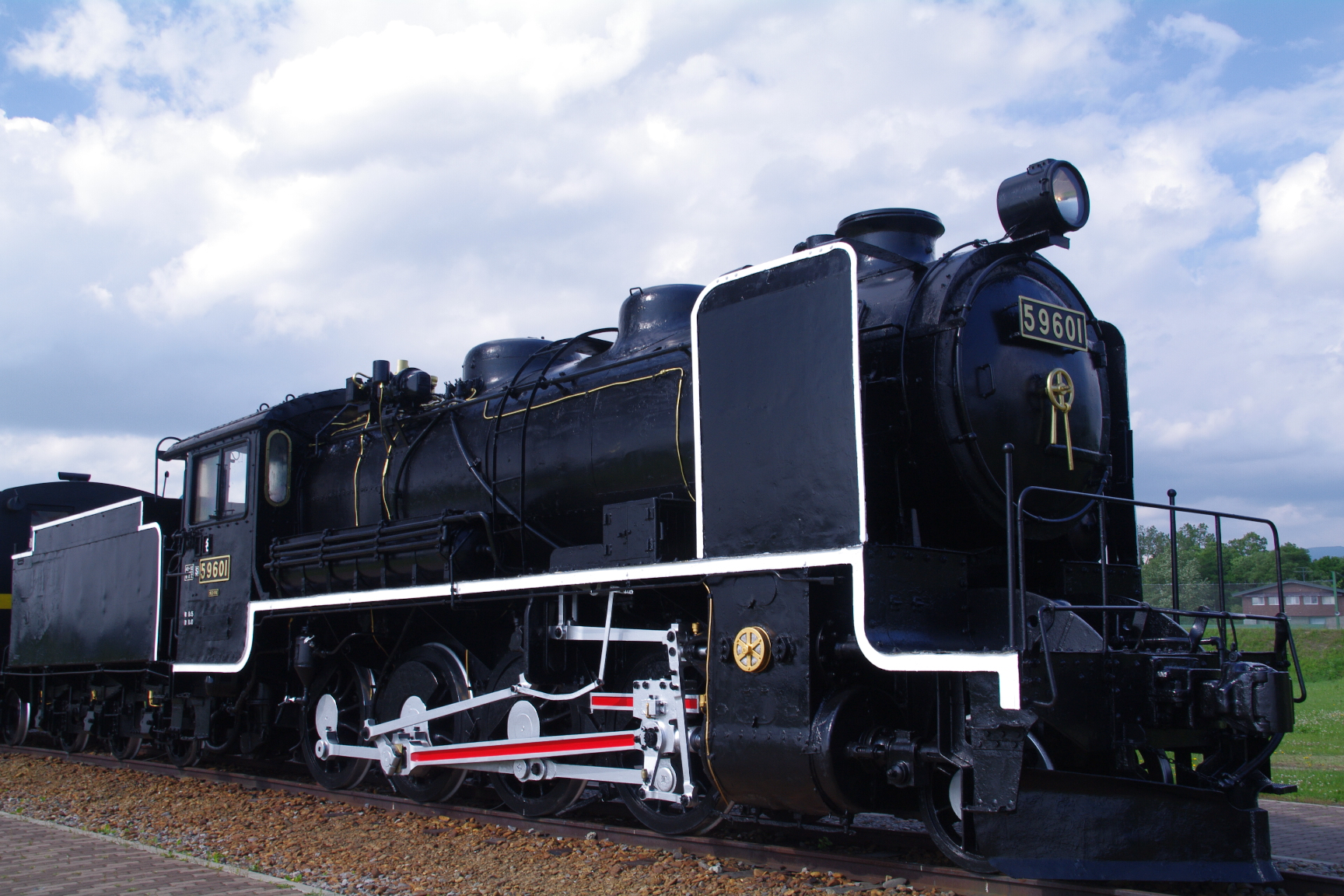
59601 preserved in Nayoro, Hokkaido

== See also ==
- Japan Railways locomotive numbering and classification
- JNR Class D50
- JNR Class D51
- JNR Class D52
- JNR Class D60
- JNR Class D61
- JNR Class D62
