= Tsunomure Castle =

Castle in Kusu, Ōita, Japan

- 角牟礼城
- Kusu, Ōita Japan
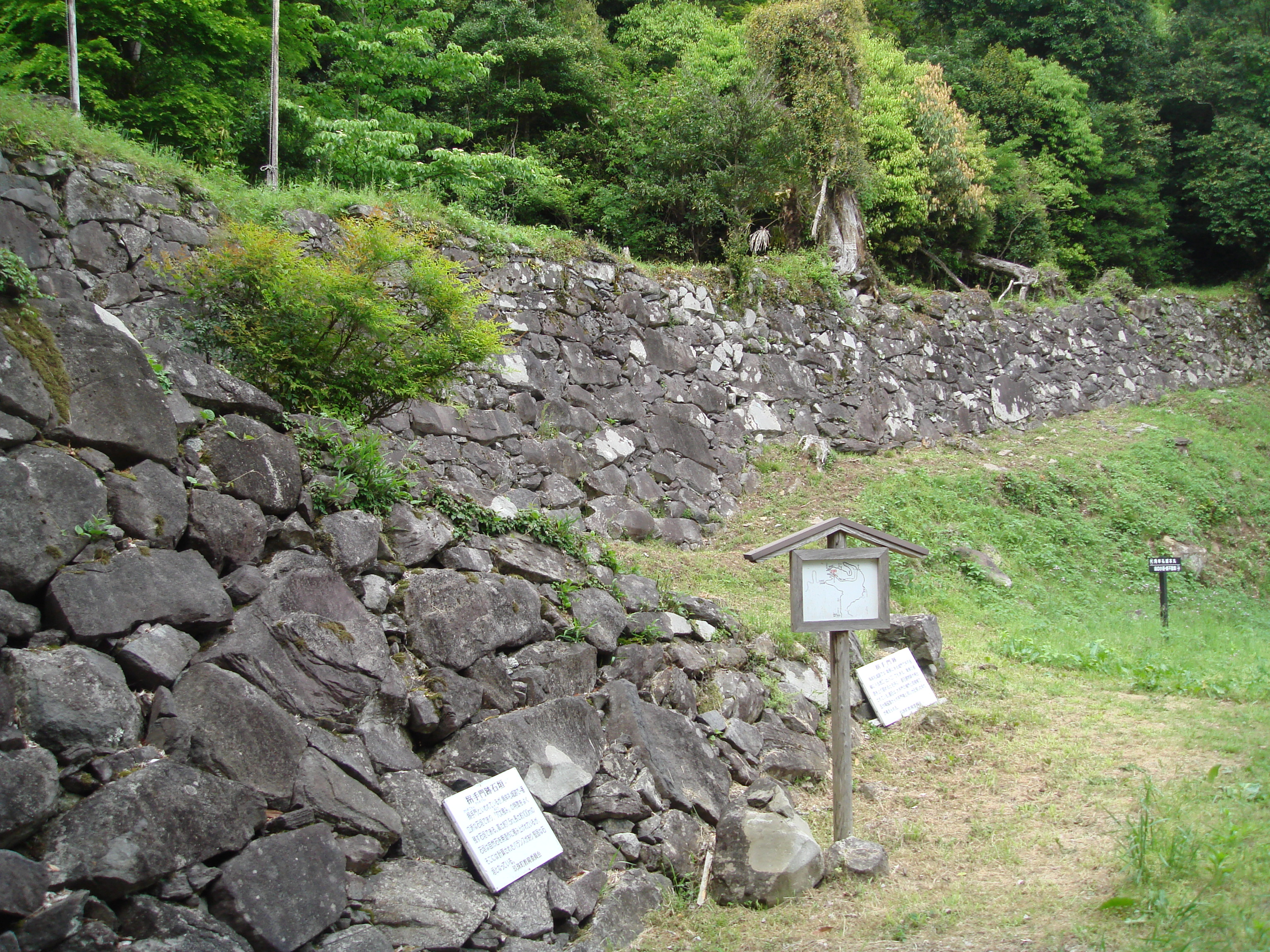
- Walls of Tsunomure Castle

Site information
- Type: yamajiro-style Japanese castle
- Controlled by: Mori clan
- Open to the public: yes
- Condition: Archaeological and designated national historical site; castle ruins

Location
- Coordinates: 33°18′33.7″N 131°9′16.2″E

Site history
- Built: c.1278-1288
- In use: Sengoku period
- National Historic Site of Japan

Tsunomure Castle (角牟礼城, Tsunomure-jō) was a yamajiro-style Japanese castle located in the town of Kusu, Ōita Prefecture, Japan. Its ruins have been protected as a National Historic Site since 2005. It is on the list "Continued 100 Fine Castles of Japan".

== Overview ==
The Kusu Basin had been ruled by local warlords since the Heian period, and the 200-meter horn-shaped Mount Tsunomure dominated a strategic point for transportation between Bungo Province and Buzen Province, Mori Tomomichi is said to have built a fortification on this mountain during the Kōan era (1278-1288); however, the first time the castle can be confirmed in historical documentation is in 1475. Later, during the Sengoku period. it was reinforced due to the conflict between the Ōuchi clan in Buzen and the Ōtomo clan in Bungo. During the invasion of Bungo by Shimazu Yoshihiro in 1586, the castle was besieged by the Shimazu army but did not fall, and became famous as an impregnable castle.

However, when Ōtomo Yoshimune was dispossessed by Toyotomi Hideyoshi and exiled, his retainers suffered the same fate and Tsunomure Castle was also confiscated. Hideyoshi assigned the case to his old retainer Mori Takamasa. He constructed Hikuma Castle in Hita as his main stronghold and kept Tsunomure Castle as a secondary fortification, and gradually modernized its fortifications. The castle consisted roughly of four layers of enclosures. The central area was an irregular polygon-shaped area 50 meter long, with its north slope is protected by a stone wall. This wall has now collapsed, but it was originally 20 meters long and ten meters high. The total size of the castle was about 200 meter long and 100 meter wide.

Despite his dislike for Ishida Mitsunari, Mori Takamasa initially remained loyal to the Western Army and led his forces at the Siege of Tanabe in 1600. He defected to the Eastern Army shortly after the Battle of Sekigahara at the persuasion of Tōdō Takatora, and through his intercession was relocated by Tokugawa Ieyasu to the 20,000 koku holding of Saiki Domain in Bungo Province in 1601. This meant that he had to surrender both the Kusu and Hita areas. The Kusu area was given to the Kurushima clan, who were of a branch of the Murakami pirates who dominated the Seto Inland Sea during the Sengoku period. As their assigned kokudaka was only 14,000 koku, they were not permitted the prestige of having a castle, but were forced to abandon it and construct a jin'ya fortified residence at the base of the mountain as the stronghold of Mori Domain. As entry to the castle site was banned until the Meiji restoration, the remnants of stone walls, dry moats and some foundations for yagura turrets are relatively well preserved.

The castle ruins are a 45-minute walk from JR Kyushu Kyūdai Main Line Bungo-Mori Station.

== See also ==
- List of Historic Sites of Japan (Ōita)
