= Tanabata-ike Kofun =

Burial mound in Shime, Japan

Tanabataike Kofun
- 七夕池古墳 (Japanese)
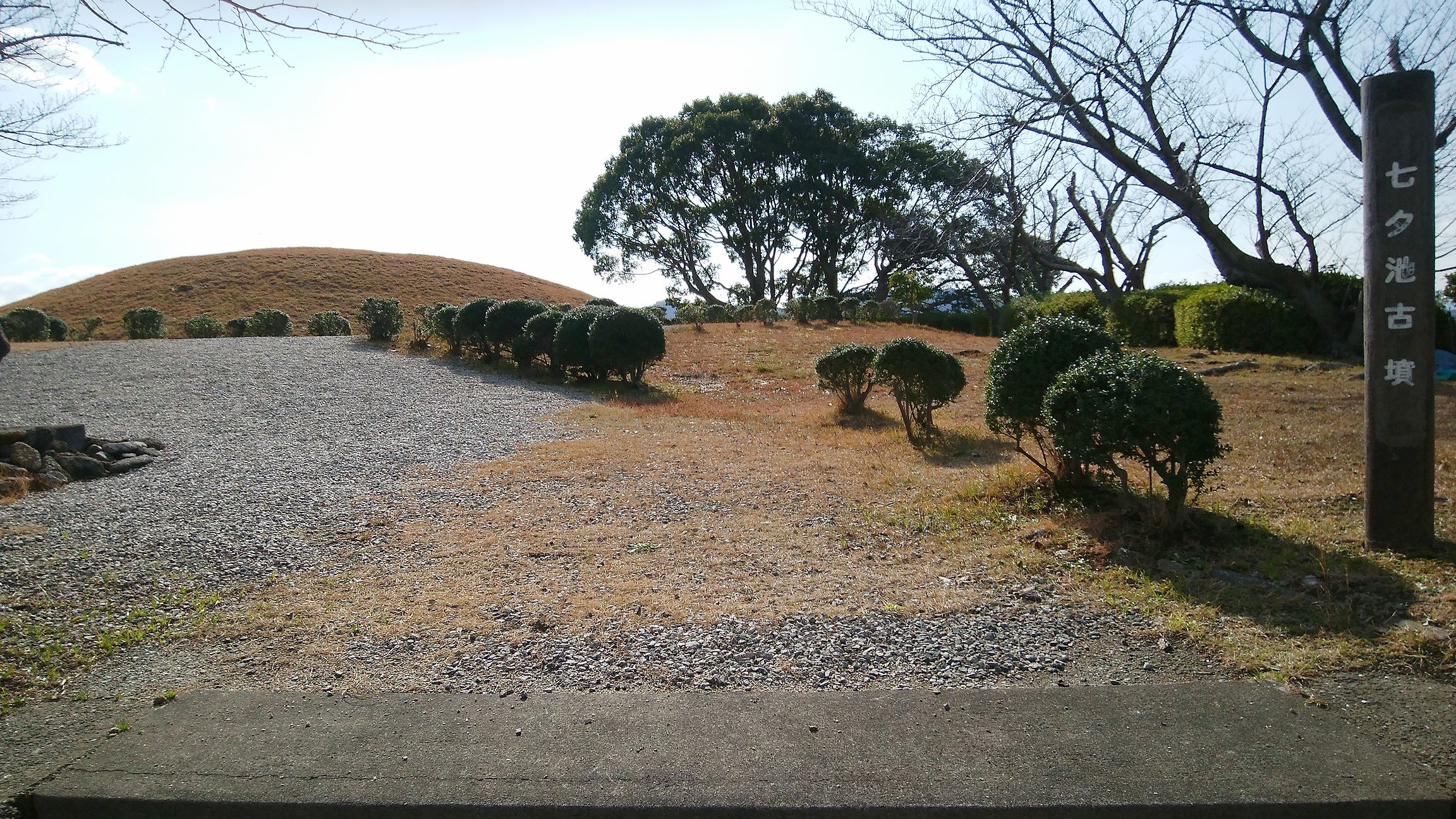
- Tanabataike Kofun

- Tanabataike Kofun Tanabata-ike Kofun (Japan)
- Interactive map of Tanabataike Kofun
- 33°34′47″N 130°29′58″E
- Type: Kofun
- Periods: Kofun period
- Location: Shime, Fukuoka, Japan
- Region: Kyushu

History
- Built: c.4th century

Site notes
- Public access: Yes (park)

The Tanabataike Kofun (七夕池古墳) is a Kofun period burial mound, located in the Tabomi neighborhood of the town of Shime, Kasuya District, Fukuoka Prefecture, Japan. The tumulus was designated a National Historic Site of Japan in 1975, with the area under protection expanded in 2001.

== Overview ==
The Tanabataike Kofun is located at the tip of a small hill that extends on the right bank of the upper reaches of the Umi River, which flows into Hakata Bay, and is located approximately 300 meters across a narrow valley to the north of Kōshōji Kofun. It borders a reservoir called Tanabata Pond, from which it is named. It was discovered during the construction of a residential area in 1972. The tumulus is an enpun (円墳)-style circular tumulus approximately 29 meters in diameter and 3.7 meters in height, and was constructed in three stages. The fukiishi is largely intact. The burial facility is a vertical pit-style stone burial chamber made of river stones, and is only about 1.8 meters long. There are traces of a wooden coffin being placed inside the burial chamber, and the short side panels of the wooden coffin were inserted into the ground, and a woman in her 40s or 50s was buried inside. Grave goods such as a small full-length bronze mirror, kotohashira-shaped stone products, an iron sword, and more than 3500 beads. Iron utensils, magatama beads, and Haji ware pottery were unearthed outside the coffin. From these artifacts, the tumulus is thought to have been built between the end of the 4th century and the beginning of the 5th century.

The site was opened as a park in 1972. Later, when the privately owned land on the east side of the burial mound was excavated in 1999, a 3.65-meter-wide-moat was confirmed, and this area was additionally designated in 2001. Artifacts excavated are displayed at the Shime Town Historical Materials Room.

== See also ==
- List of Historic Sites of Japan (Fukuoka)
