= Bungo-Mori Roundhouse =

Former railway roundhouse in Kusu, Oita Prefecture

Coordinates: 33.2810°N 131.1585°E

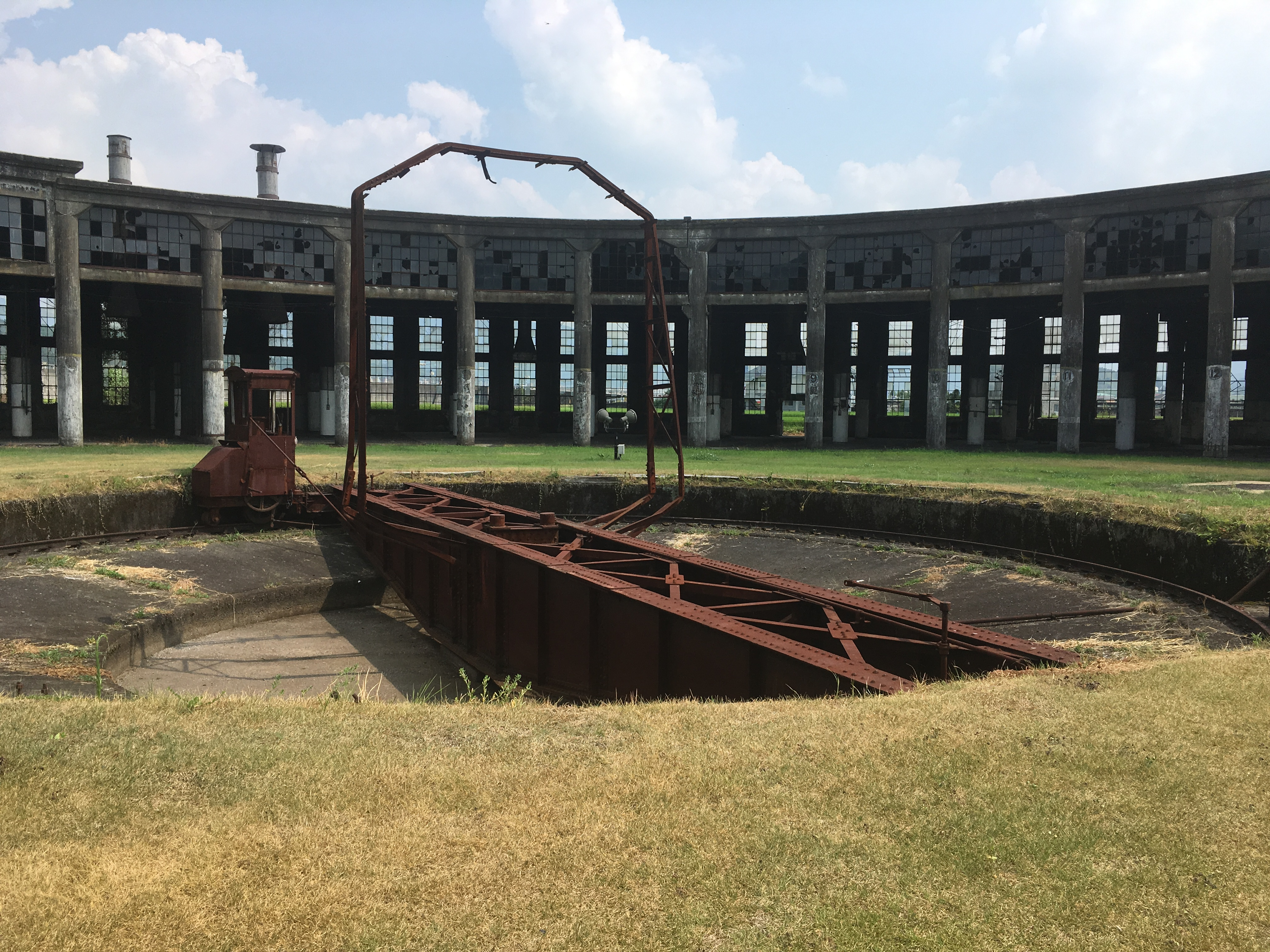
- Interactive map of Bungo-Mori Roundhouse

Location
- Location: 242-7 Iwamuro, Kusu, Kusu District, Ōita Prefecture, Japan 879-4405

Characteristics
- Operator: Japanese National Railways

History
- Opened: 1934
- Closed: 1971

Bungo-Mori Roundhouse (Japanese: 豊後森機関庫, Hepburn: Bungo-Mori-Kikanko) was a railway roundhouse located to the east of Bungo-mori Station on the Kyūdai Main Line in Kusu, Ōita Prefecture, Japan.

The roundhouse and its turntable, which operated from 1934 to 1971, were designated as a National Tangible Cultural Asset in 2012 as the last roundhouse in Kyushu.

== History ==
Bungo-Mori Roundhouse was completed in 1934 and was able to hold 25 steam locomotives at its peak around the year 1948.

During the Second World War, Bungo-Mori Roundhouse was used for military transport. It was strafed by carrier-based United States Military aircraft on August 4, 1945, killing three staff members. Bullet holes can still be seen on the walls of the roundhouse.

In 1970, the Kyūdai Main Line stopped using steam locomotives and Bungo-Mori Roundhouse was closed the following year. The roundhouse, now with rusted steel frames and broken windows, is a historical landmark and a popular tourist destination.

== Sightseeing ==
In 2015, the JNR Class 9600 steam locomotive No. 29612, which was built in 1919, was moved from Shime, Fukuoka Prefecture to Bungo-Mori Roundhouse for preservation. It is now displayed in front of the roundhouse.

A museum for the Bungo-Mori Roundhouse was created by industrial designer Eiji Mitooka in a renovated staff room to the west of the former roundhouse.

In 2023, a door was erected in front of the roundhouse in a reference to the 2022 animated film Suzume.

== Gallery ==
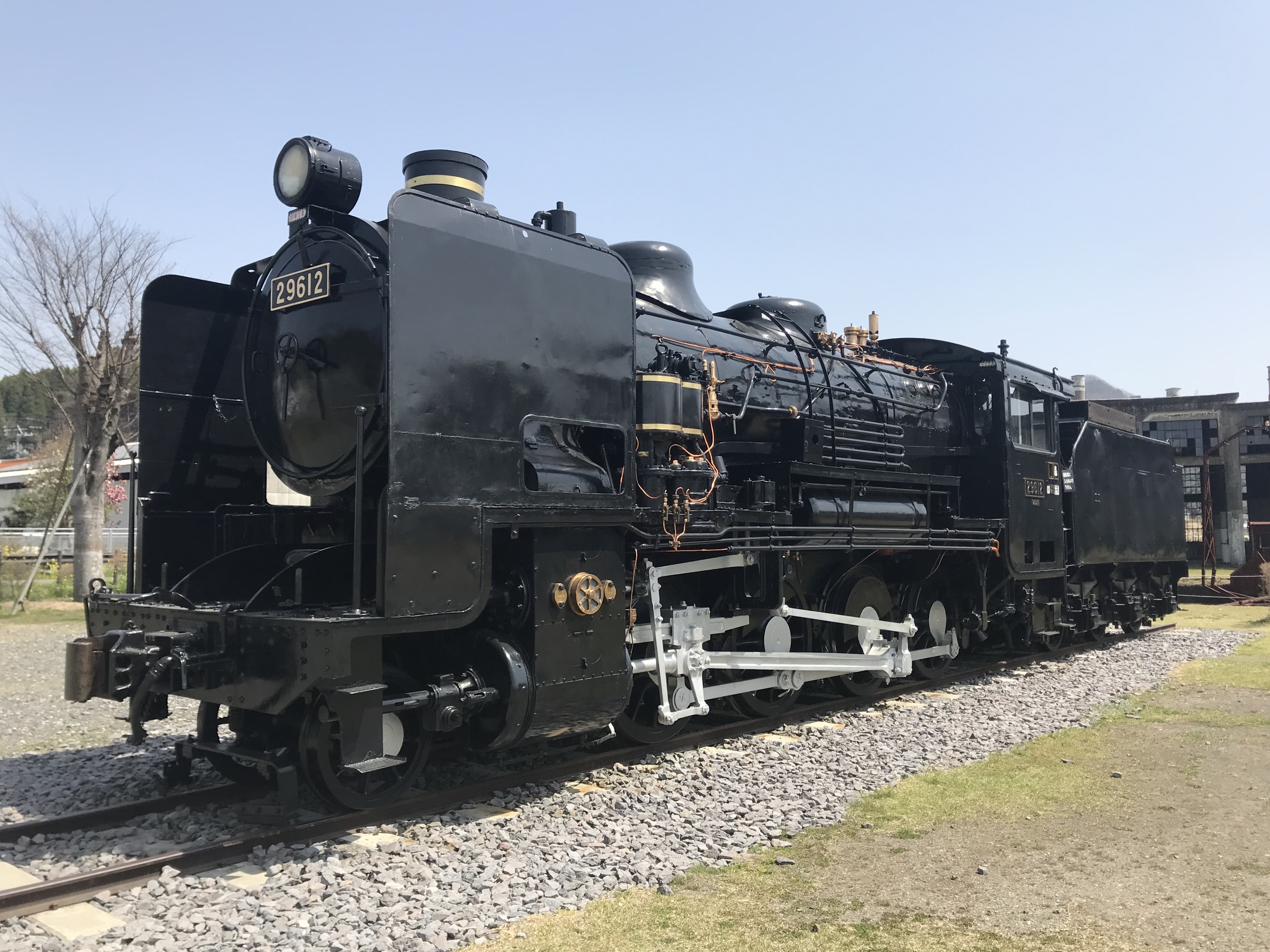
JNR Class 9600–29612 in front of Bungo-Mori Roundhouse

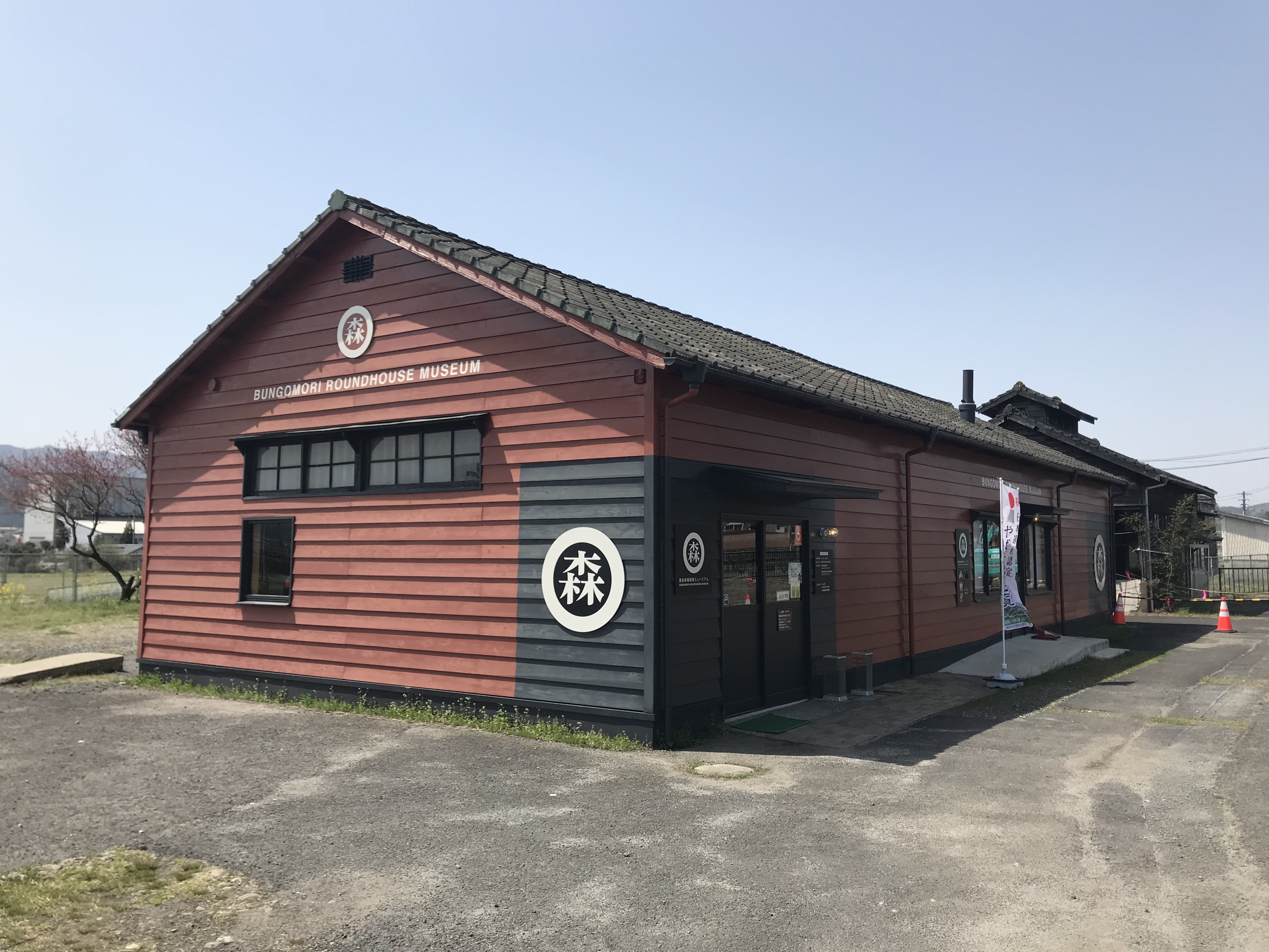
Bungo-Mori Roundhouse Museum

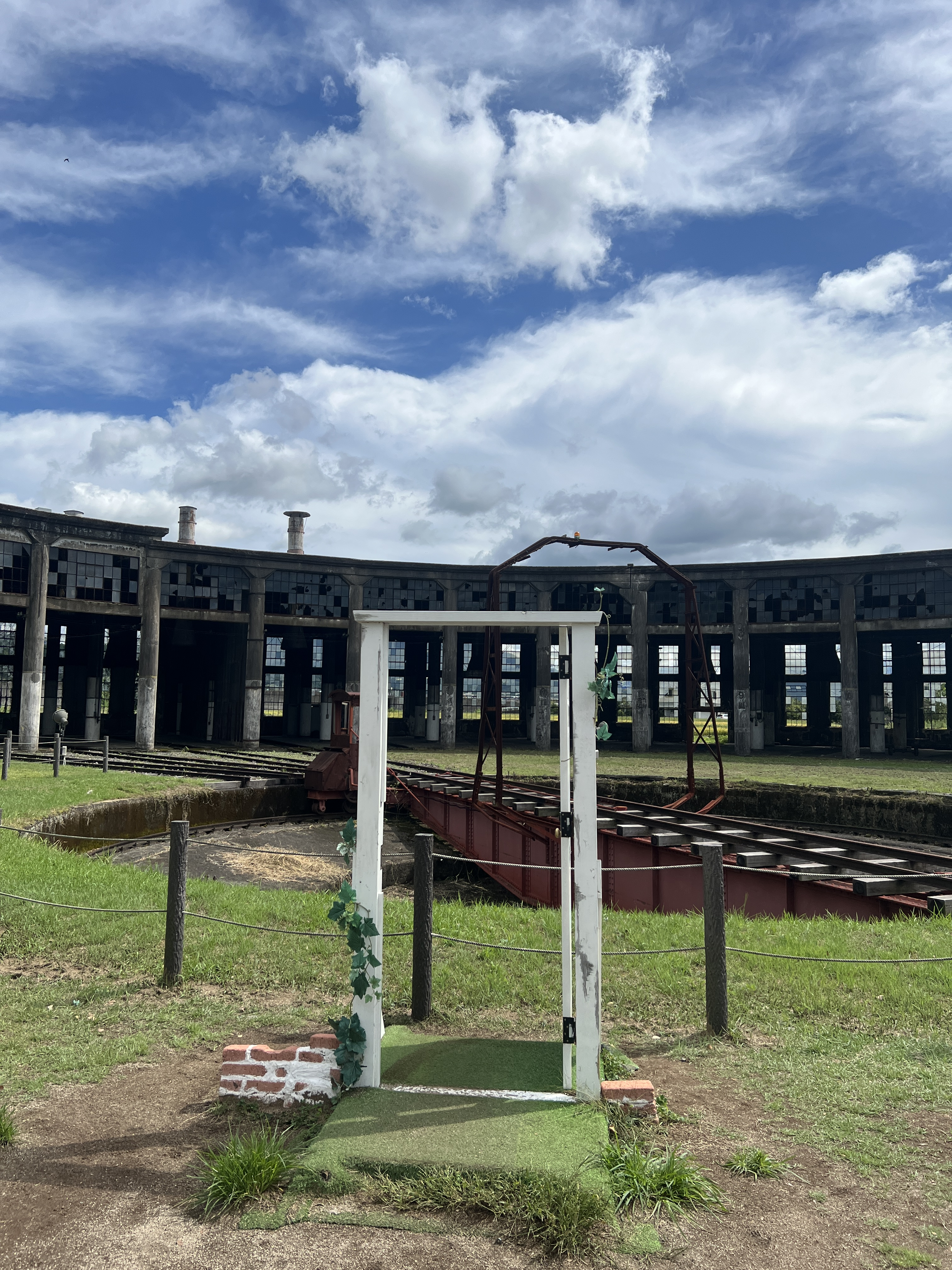
Door at Bungo-Mori Roundhouse referencing the film Suzume
