= JNR Class D52 =

Class of 285 Japanese 2-8-2 locomotives

Class D52
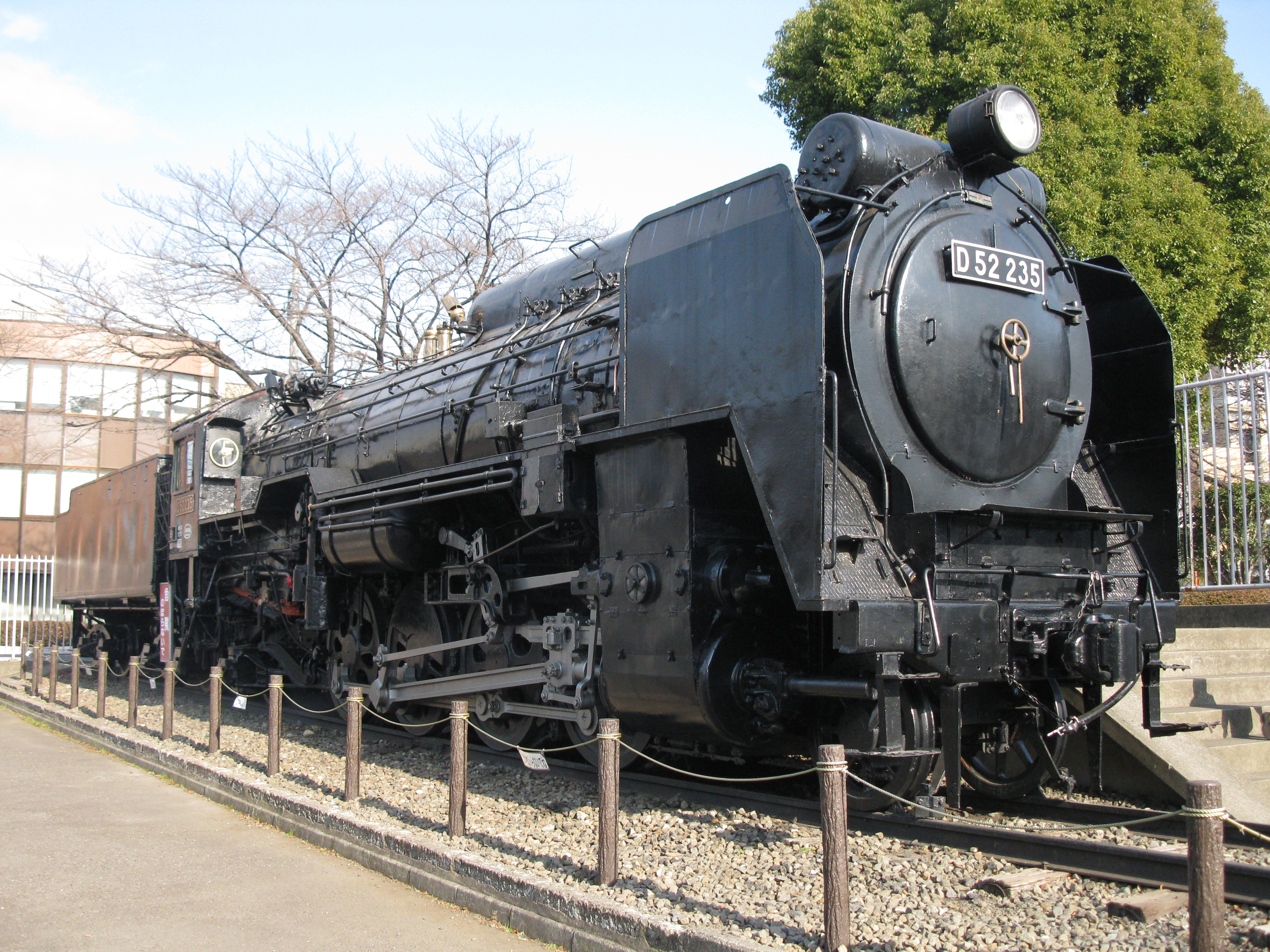
- Preserved D52 235 in Sagamihara, January 2011
Type and origin
- Power type: Steam
- Builder: JNR Kisha Seizo, Nippon Sharyo Kawasaki Heavy Industries Rolling Stock Company, Hitachi, Mitsubishi Heavy Industries
- Build date: 1943-1946
- Total produced: 285
Specifications
- Configuration
  - Whyte: 2-8-2 (1-D-1) Mikado
- Gauge: 1,067 mm (3 ft 6 in)
- Length: 21,105 mm (69 ft 2.9 in)
- Height: 3,982 mm (13 ft 0.8 in)
- Loco weight: 85.13 t (93.84 short tons; 83.79 long tons)
- Fuel type: Coal
- Valve gear: Walschaerts
Performance figures
- Maximum speed: 85 km/h (53 mph)
- Tractive effort: 190.2 kN (42,800 lb_{f})
Career
- Operators: JNR
- Numbers: D52 1-D52 152, D52 198-D52 238, D52 333-D52 384, D52 393-D52 423, D52 443-D52 468
- Retired: 24 December 1972
- Disposition: Six preserved; remainder scrapped

The Class D52 is a type of 2-8-2 steam locomotive built by the Japanese Government Railways (Now Japanese National Railways) and various manufacturers: Kisha Seizo, Nippon Sharyo, Kawasaki Heavy Industries Rolling Stock Company, Hitachi, and Mitsubishi Heavy Industries from 1943 to 1946. The name consists of a "D" for the four sets of driving wheels and the class number 52 for tender locomotives that the numbers 50 through 99 were assigned to under the 1928 locomotive classification rule.

== Preserved examples ==
Most of the D52s have been scrapped. However, six locomotives have been preserved.

D52 1 was scrapped in early March 2026 due to severe corrosion.

- D52 1, at JR Freight Hiroshima Depot [scrapped, due to corrosion]
- D52 70 is semi-operational and runs on a short line, on compressed air, at a park in Yamakita, Kanagawa.
- D52 72, in Gotemba, Shizuoka Notable for being seen in Episode 2 of the anime series OVERTAKE!
- D52 136, in Numazu, Shizuoka
- D52 235, in Kanuma Park, Sagamihara, Kanagawa
- D52 403, in Hiratsuka, Kanagawa
- D52 468, at the Kyoto Railway Museum, Kyoto
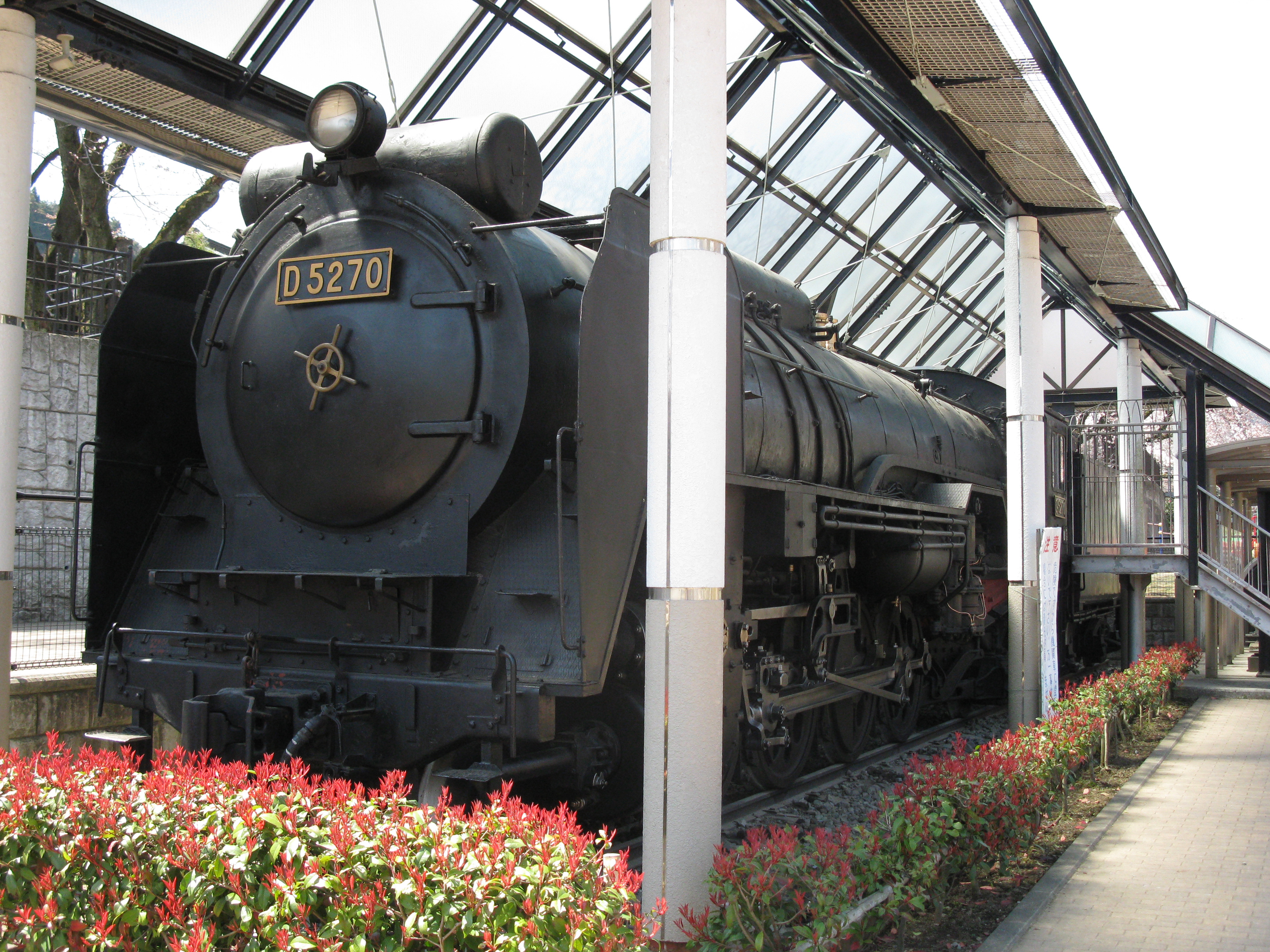
D52 70, April 2011

D52 72, August 2022

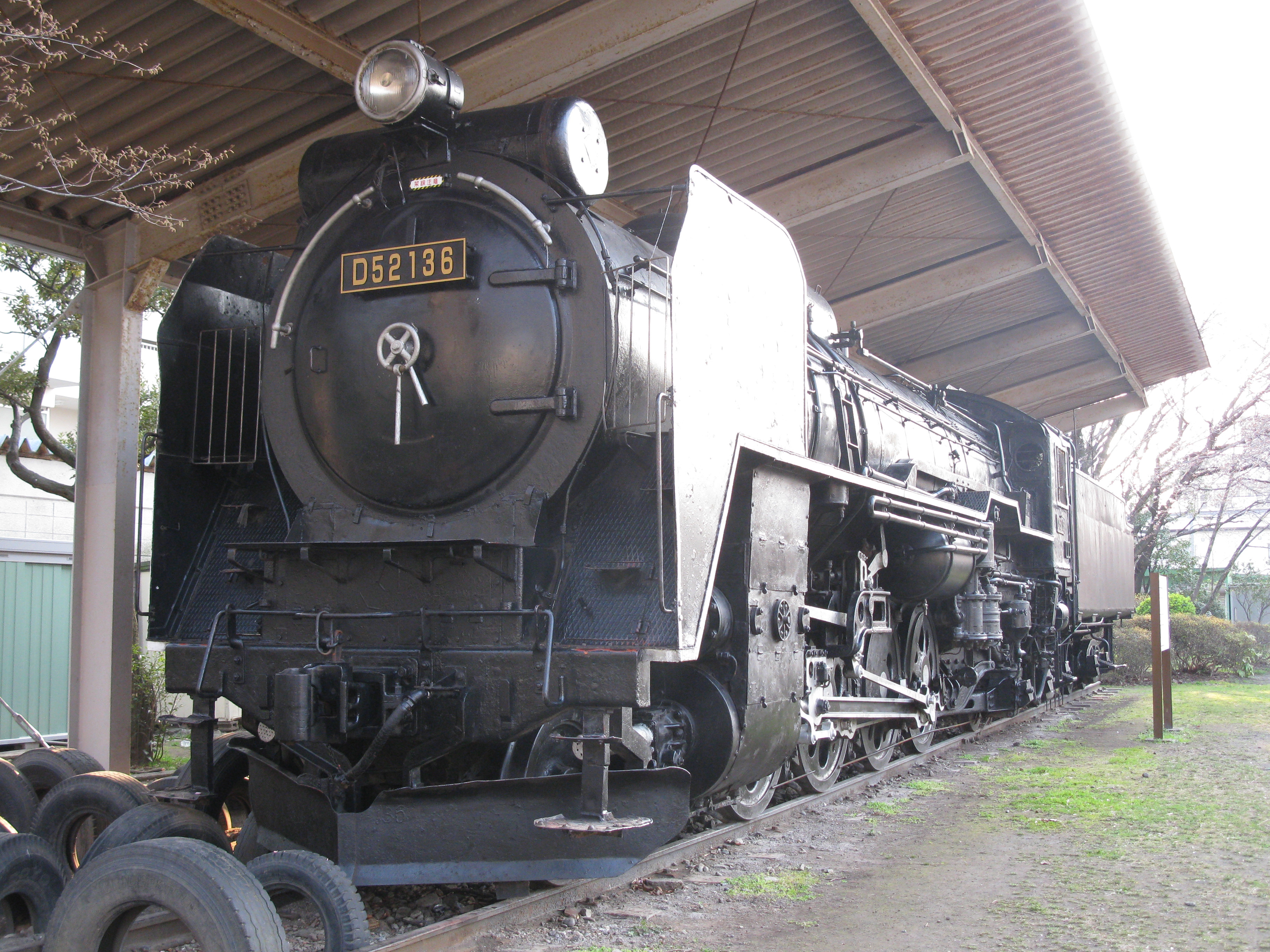
D52 136, March 2011

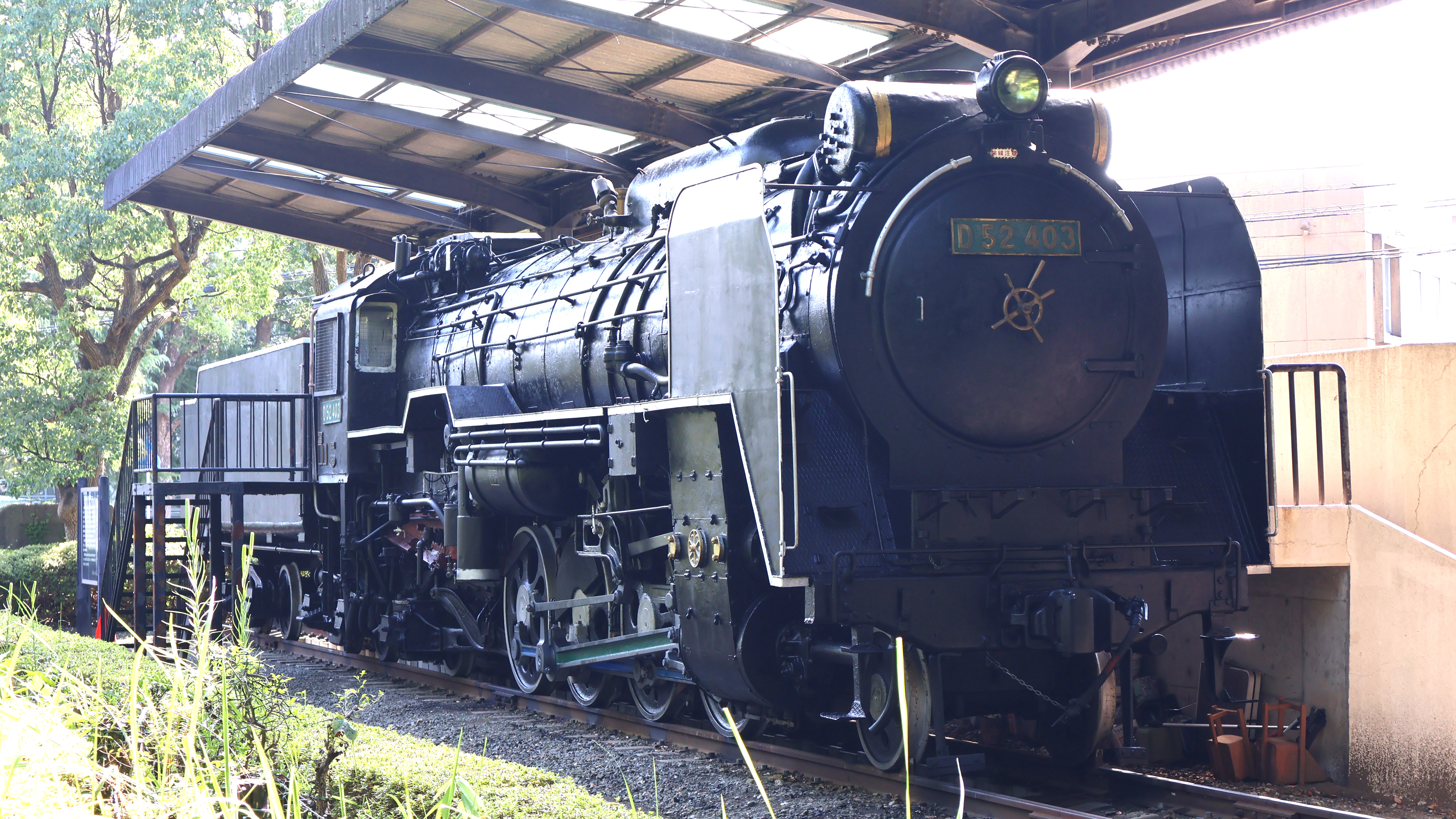
D52 403, September 2024

== See also ==
- Japan Railways locomotive numbering and classification
- JNR Class 9600
- JNR Class D50
- JNR Class D51
