= Kōshōji Kofun =

Japanese burial mound

- 光正寺古墳 (Japanese)
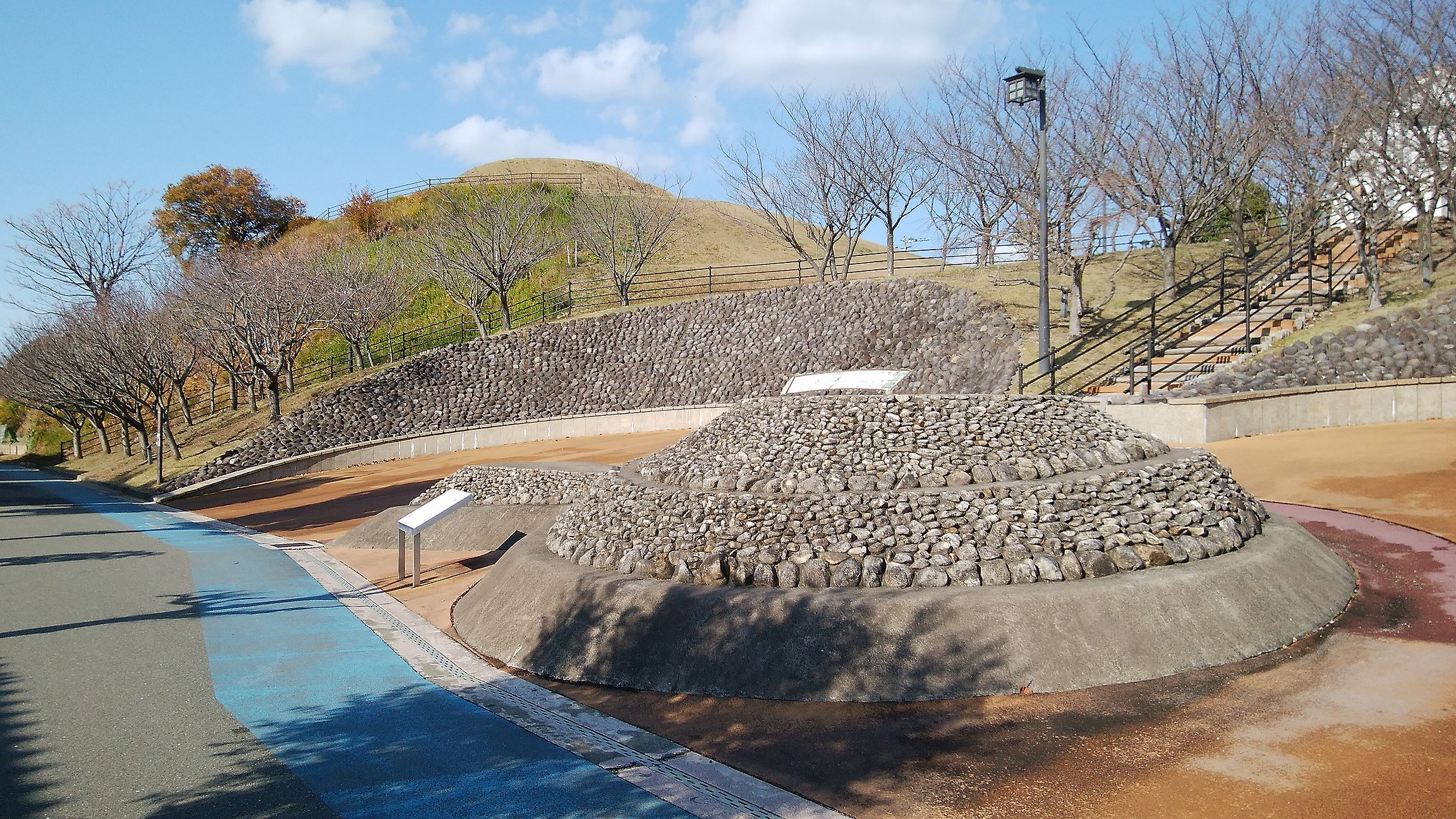
- Kōshōji Kofun

- Kōshōji Kofun Kōshōji Kofun (Japan)
- Interactive map of Kōshōji Kofun
- 33°34′41″N 130°29′59″E
- Type: Kofun
- Periods: Kofun period
- Location: Umi, Fukuoka, Japan
- Region: Kyushu

History
- Built: c.3rd century

Site notes
- Public access: Yes (park and museum)

The Kōshōji Kofun (光正寺古墳) is a Kofun period burial mound, located in the Kōshōji neighborhood of the town of Umi, Fukuoka Prefecture Japan. The tumulus was designated a National Historic Site of Japan in 1975.

== Overview ==
The Kōshōji Kofun is a zenpō-kōen-fun (前方後円墳), which is shaped like a keyhole, having one square end and one circular end, when viewed from above. It is built on a hill on the right bank of the Umi River, which flows into Hakata Bay and is orientated to the west-northwest. It has a total length is approximately 54 meters, with a posterior circular portion 34 meters in diameter and five meters high. The anterior rectangular portion is approximately 20 meters wide and three meters high. The upper portion of the tumulus is covered with fukiishi. It is estimated from its shape and from excavated pottery shards to have been constructed in the first half of the Kofun period, or around the middle of the third century AD.

The posterior circular portion was found to contain a burial chamber containing three box-style sarcophagi, one wooden coffin, and one earthenware coffin. Grave goods included magatama beads, cylindrical beads, Haji ware pottery pots, and iron swords. The largest box-shaped sarcophagus was made from stones brought from a great distance, including basalt thought to be from Noko Island and talc from Mt. Wakasugi. The smaller sarcophagi are made from local stone. These three sarcophagi were also lined with vermillion pigment.

The Kōshōji Kofun is the largest keyhole-shaped tumulus in Kasuya District, and is thought to be the tomb of king of Fumikoku (不弥国), one of the countries that existed in the Japanese archipelago in the 3rd century according to The History of the Three Kingdoms, Wei's Dongyi biography, commonly known as Wajin Biography, and History of the Northern Dynasties.

Artifacts from the site are stored in the Umi Town Museum of History and Folklore. Currently, the surrounding area to the tumulus is being maintained as a historical park, and a one-fifth scale model of the tumulus as it originally looked is located in the Guidance Plaza. The tumulus is about a 15-minute walk from Sue-Chuo Station on the JR Kyushu Kashii Line.

== See also ==
- List of Historic Sites of Japan (Fukuoka)
