= Kusu, Ōita =

Kusu 玖珠町
- Town
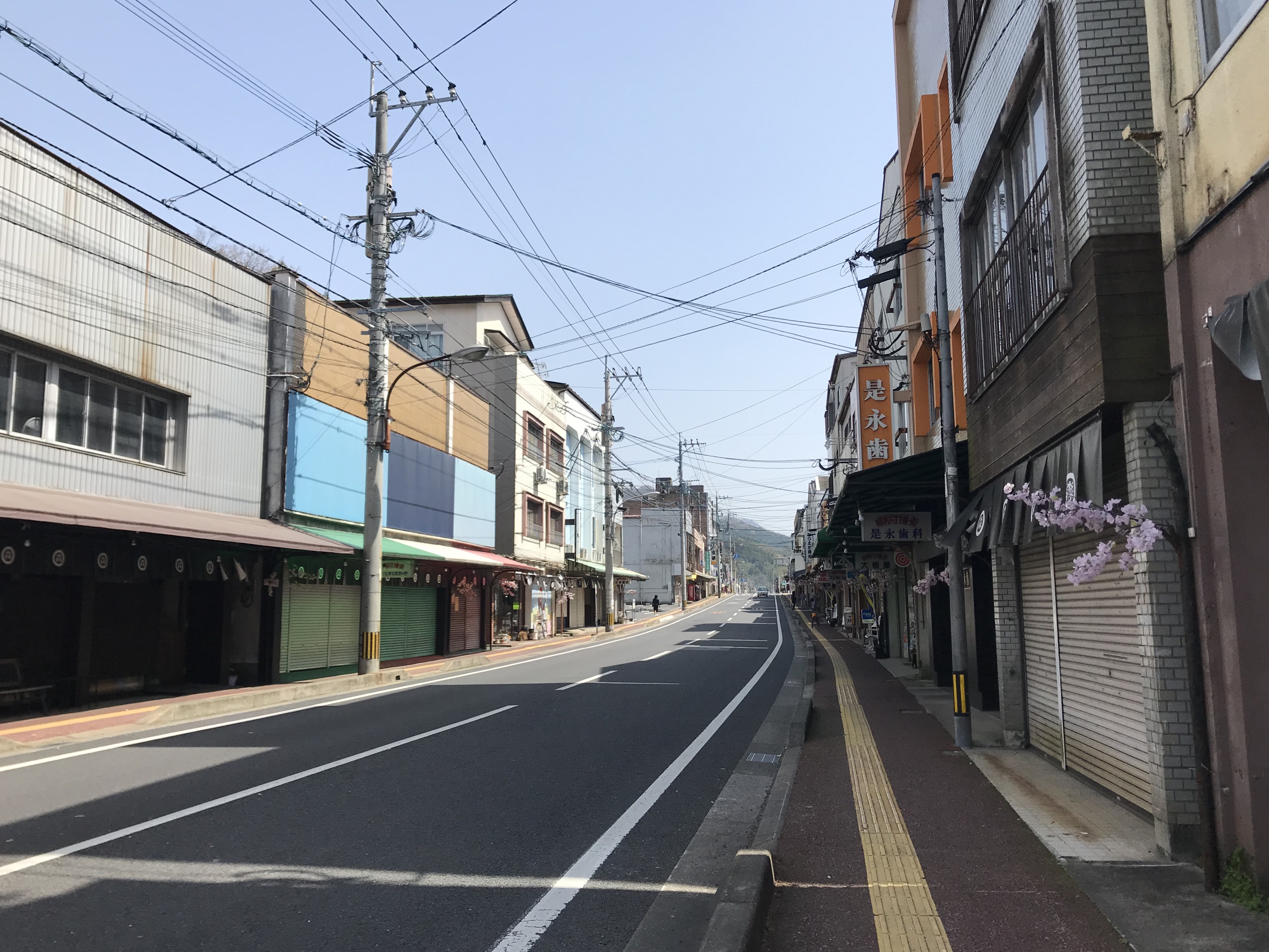
- Kusu Town

- Flag Chapter
- Interactive map of Kusu
- Location in Japan
- Coordinates: 33°16′59″N 131°9′5.4″E
- Country: Japan
- Region: Kyushu
- Prefecture: Ōita
- District: Kusu

Government
  - Mayor: Masakazu Shukuri

Area
  - Total: 286.51 km^{2} (110.62 sq mi)

Population (November 30, 2023)
  - Total: 14,085
  - Density: 49.161/km^{2} (127.33/sq mi)
- Time zone: UTC+09:00 (JST)
- Climate: Cfa
- Website: Official website
- Symbols
- Flower: Rhododendron japonicum
- Tree: Camphor; Japanese zelkova

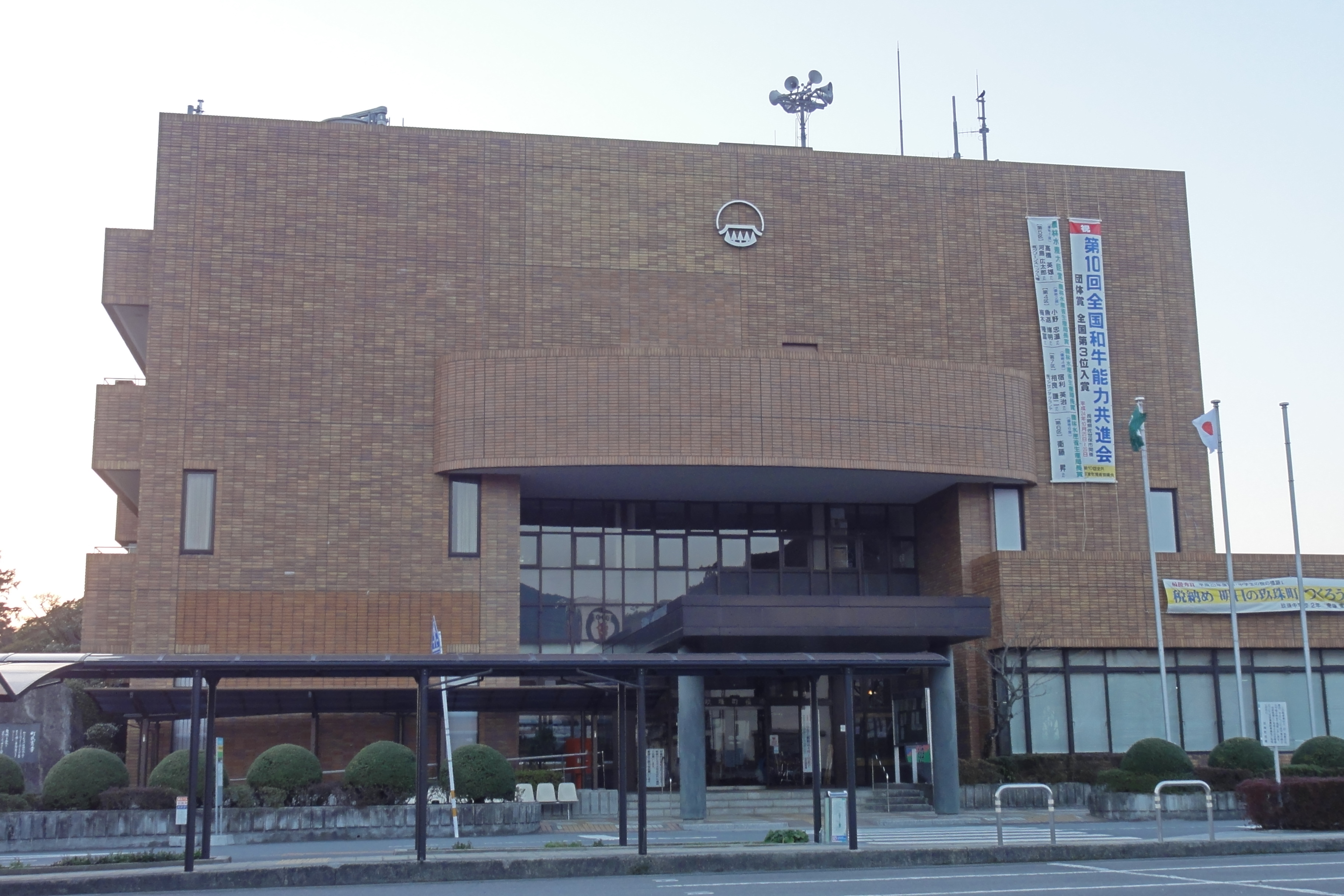
Kusu Town Hall

Kusu (玖珠町, Kusu-machi) is a town located in Kusu District, Ōita Prefecture, Japan. As of 30 November 2023, the town had an estimated population of 14,085 in 6590 households, and a population density of 49 persons per km^{2}. The total area of the city is 286.51 km^{2} (110.62 sq mi).

== Geography ==
Kusu is located in midwestern Ōita Prefecture, approximately 60 kilometers west of the prefectural capital at Ōita City, and slightly borders Kumamoto Prefecture in the south. The town area is in the Kyushu Mountains, and much of the town area is within the borders of the Yaba-Hita-Hikosan Quasi-National Park. In the northern part of the town is the Hiseidai Training Range, the largest training range for the Japan Ground Self-Defense Force in western Japan.

=== Neighbouring municipalities ===
Kumamoto Prefecture

- Oguni

Ōita Prefecture

- Hita
- Kokonoe
- Nakatsu
- Usa

=== Climate ===
Kusu has a humid subtropical climate (Köppen climate classification Cfa) with hot summers and cool winters. Precipitation is significant throughout the year but is somewhat lower in winter. The average annual temperature in Kusu is 14.1 °C (57.4 °F). The average annual rainfall is 1,878.0 mm (73.94 in) with July as the wettest month. The temperatures are highest on average in August, at around 25.7 °C (78.3 °F), and lowest in January, at around 2.5 °C (36.5 °F). The highest temperature ever recorded in Kusu was 38.8 °C (101.8 °F) on 18 July 1994; the coldest temperature ever recorded was −14.7 °C (5.5 °F) on 3 February 2012.

Climate data for Kusu (1991−2020 normals, extremes 1977−present)
Month	Jan	Feb	Mar	Apr	May	Jun	Jul	Aug	Sep	Oct	Nov	Dec	Year
Record high °C (°F)	19.4 (66.9)	23.6 (74.5)	25.9 (78.6)	30.9 (87.6)	33.2 (91.8)	35.9 (96.6)	38.8 (101.8)	38.3 (100.9)	37.1 (98.8)	32.5 (90.5)	26.7 (80.1)	22.6 (72.7)	38.8 (101.8)
Mean daily maximum °C (°F)	7.9 (46.2)	9.7 (49.5)	13.8 (56.8)	19.7 (67.5)	24.7 (76.5)	27.0 (80.6)	30.7 (87.3)	31.9 (89.4)	27.7 (81.9)	22.1 (71.8)	16.2 (61.2)	10.2 (50.4)	20.1 (68.3)
Daily mean °C (°F)	2.5 (36.5)	3.9 (39.0)	7.5 (45.5)	12.8 (55.0)	17.8 (64.0)	21.5 (70.7)	25.3 (77.5)	25.7 (78.3)	21.8 (71.2)	15.8 (60.4)	9.9 (49.8)	4.4 (39.9)	14.1 (57.3)
Mean daily minimum °C (°F)	−2.0 (28.4)	−1.3 (29.7)	1.7 (35.1)	6.3 (43.3)	11.5 (52.7)	17.1 (62.8)	21.2 (70.2)	21.4 (70.5)	17.4 (63.3)	10.6 (51.1)	4.5 (40.1)	−0.5 (31.1)	9.0 (48.2)
Record low °C (°F)	−11.5 (11.3)	−14.7 (5.5)	−8.1 (17.4)	−3.8 (25.2)	0.4 (32.7)	6.4 (43.5)	11.7 (53.1)	13.7 (56.7)	5.3 (41.5)	−1.1 (30.0)	−4.7 (23.5)	−9.0 (15.8)	−14.7 (5.5)
Average precipitation mm (inches)	63.1 (2.48)	79.0 (3.11)	117.4 (4.62)	120.4 (4.74)	147.1 (5.79)	361.2 (14.22)	364.1 (14.33)	195.3 (7.69)	188.9 (7.44)	97.8 (3.85)	80.6 (3.17)	63.2 (2.49)	1,878 (73.94)
Average precipitation days (≥ 1.0 mm)	9.0	9.8	11.9	10.1	9.9	14.1	13.8	11.4	11.2	7.9	8.7	8.9	126.7
Mean monthly sunshine hours	113.4	129.1	156.7	181.8	192.4	124.7	155.2	180.6	135.7	159.5	136.7	121.5	1,787.4
Source: Japan Meteorological Agency

=== Demographics ===
Per Japanese census data, the population of Kusu in 2020 is 14,386 people. Kusu has been conducting censuses since 1920.

Historical population
Year	Pop.	±%
1920	19,064	—
1925	19,890	+4.3%
1930	20,515	+3.1%
1935	22,093	+7.7%
1940	21,685	−1.8%
1945	27,110	+25.0%
1950	27,782	+2.5%
1955	28,622	+3.0%
1960	28,300	−1.1%
1965	25,565	−9.7%
1970	23,828	−6.8%
1975	22,369	−6.1%
1980	22,775	+1.8%
1985	22,079	−3.1%
1990	20,907	−5.3%
1995	19,659	−6.0%
2000	18,988	−3.4%
2005	18,276	−3.7%
2010	17,057	−6.7%
2015	15,823	−7.2%
2020	14,386	−9.1%
Kusu population statistics

== History ==
The area of Kusu was part of ancient Bungo Province. During the Edo period the area was mostly part of the holdings of Mori Domain. Following the Meiji restoration, the village of Mannen (万年村) within Kusu District, Ōita was established on May 1, 1889 with the creation of the modern municipalities system. Mannen was raised to town status on April 1, 1927 and was renamed Kusu. On March 1,1955 Kusu annexed the neighboring town of Mori and the villages of Kitayamada, and Yahata.

== Government ==
Kusu has a mayor-council form of government with a directly elected mayor and a unicameral town council of 14 members. Kusu, together with Kokonoe, contributes one member to the Ōita Prefectural Assembly. In terms of national politics, the town is part of the Ōita 2nd district of the lower house of the Diet of Japan.

== Economy ==
The economy of Kusu is centered on agriculture and forestry.

== Education ==
Kuso has nine public elementary schools and one public junior high school operated by the town government, and one public high school operated by the Ōita Prefectural Board of Education.

== Transportation ==
=== Railways ===
JR Kyushu - Kyūdai Main Line

- Sugikawachi - Kita-Yamada - Bungo-Mori

=== Highways ===
- Ōita Expressway
- National Route 210
- National Route 387

== Local attractions ==
- Bungo-Mori Roundhouse
- Tsunomure Castle ruins

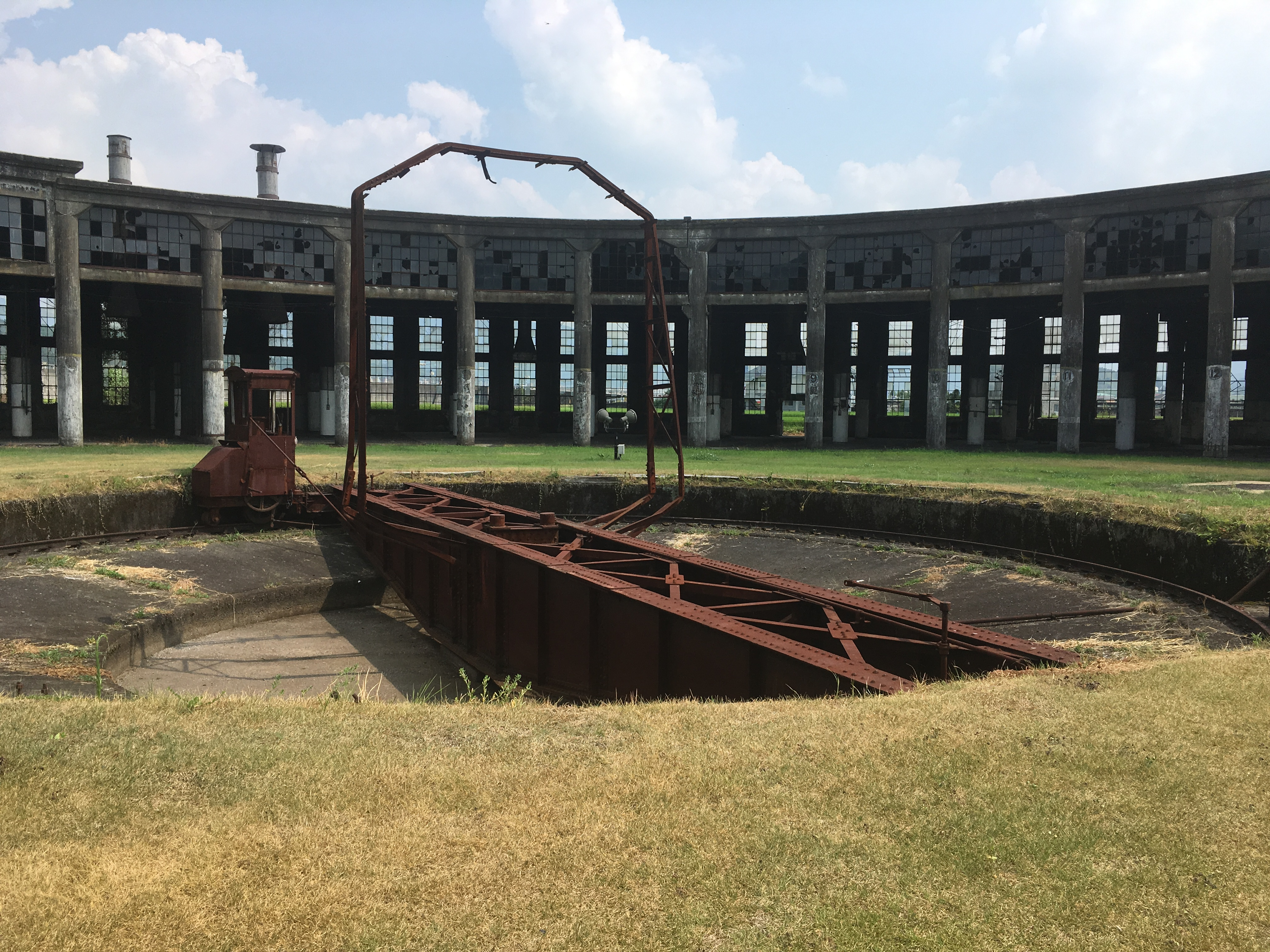
Bungo-Mori Roundhouse in Kusu

== Notable people from Kusu ==
- Seishiro Etō, politician
- Ryunosuke Kimura, theatre director
- Kurushima Takehiko, former children's literature author
