= Mori Domain (Bungo) =

Administrative division in Japan during the Edo period (1601–1871)

Mori Domain 森藩
- Domain of Japan
- 1600–1871
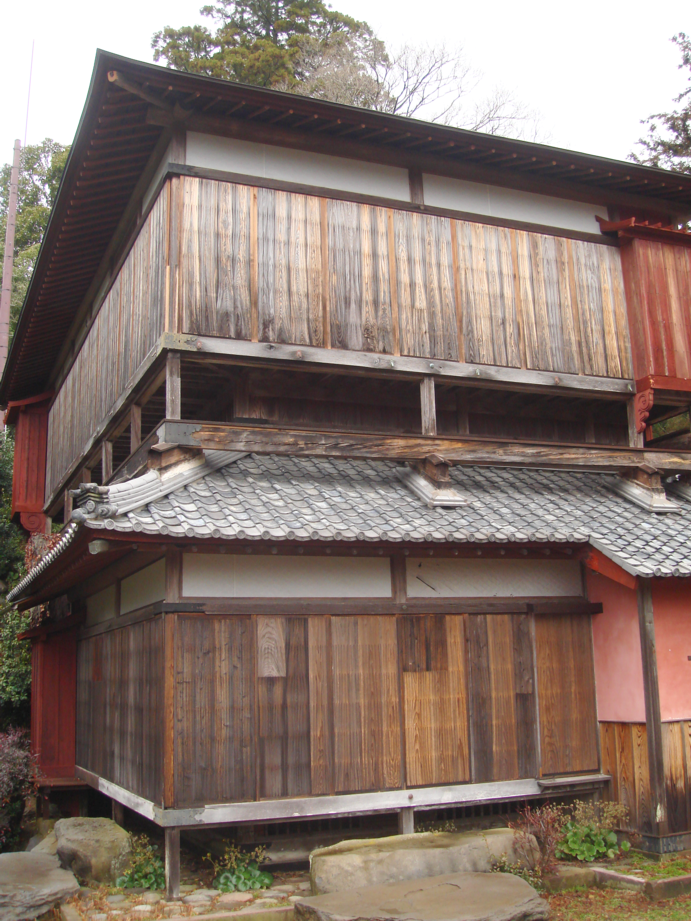
- Seihōrō teahouse at Mori jin'ya

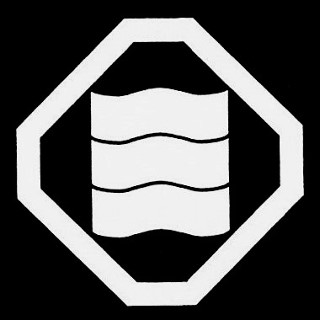
- Mon of the Kurushima clan
- Capital: Mori jin'ya
- Area
  - Coordinates: 33°18′11″N 131°9′24″E
- Historical era: Edo period
  - Established: 1600
  - Abolition of the han system: 1871
- Contained within
  - Province: Bungo Province
- Today part of: Oita Prefecture

Location of Mori jin'ya
Mori Domain (Bungo) (Japan)

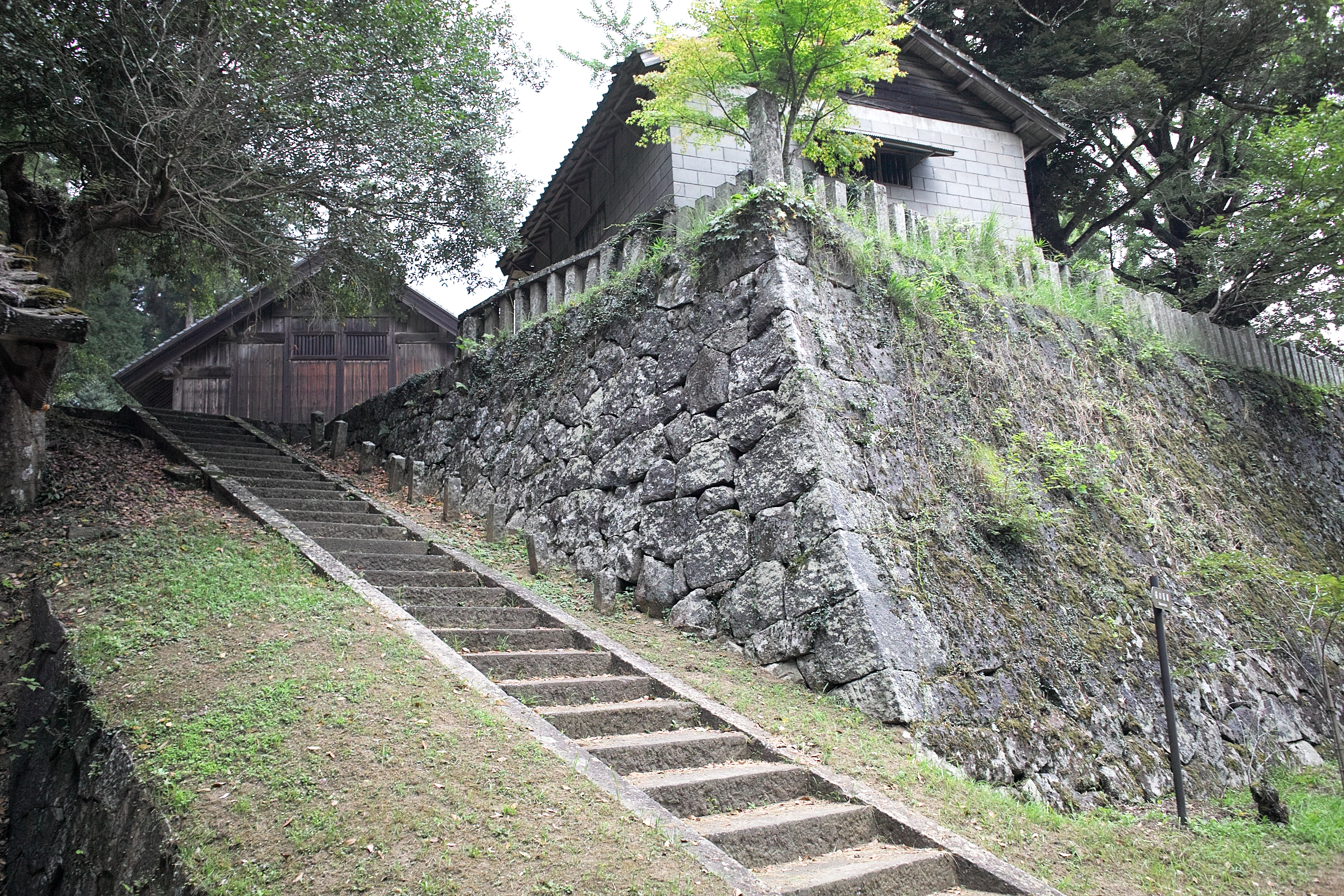
Stone walls of Mori jin'ya

Mori Domain (森藩, Mori-han) was a feudal domain under the Tokugawa shogunate of Edo period Japan, in what is now central Ōita Prefecture. It was centered around Mori Jin'ya in what is now the town of Kusu, Ōita and was ruled by the tozama daimyō Kurushima clan for all of its history.

== History ==
Mori Domain was founded by Kurushima Nagachika (later called Yasuchika), who was a descendant of a branch of the Murakami pirates who dominated the Seto Inland Sea during the Sengoku period. Under Toyotomi Hideyoshi, he held a domain 14,000 koku at Kurushima in Iyo Province. During the Battle of Sekigahara in 1600, he sided with the Western Army loyal to the Toyotomi clan; however, as his wife's uncle was Fukushima Masanori, he was able to obtain a pardon from Tokugawa Ieyasu through the assistance of Honda Masanobu and was relocated to a new fief in Bungo Province in 1601, with the same kokudaka.

The second daimyō, Kurushima Michiharu changed the kanji of his surname from [来島] to [留島] in 1616. In 1663, the third daimyō, Kurushima Michiyo, sailed from the domain's enclave of Tonari on Beppu Bay on sankin-kōtai, when he was caught in a storm in the Seto Inland Sea off the coast of Yashiro Island, Suō Province. The boat carrying his younger brother Kurushima Michikata capsized, and all on board drowned. After this, Kurushima Michiyo distributed 1,000 koku to his surviving younger brother Kurushima Michisada and 500 koku to Kurushima Michito to establish cadet branches of his house. Throughout the Edo period, the Kurushuma clan continued to rule Mori Domain for twelve generations, without any transfer or reduction of territory. The production of alum from natural sulfur deposits at onsen in Beppu was a major source of income for the domain. The traditional alum manufacturing technique was designated as a National Important Intangible Folk Cultural Property in 2006. The domain was an early supporter of the imperial side in the Boshin War, and were assigned to guard the abandoned daikansho at Hita. Following the Meiji restoration in 1871, it became Mori Prefecture due to the abolition of the han system, and was later incorporated into Ōita Prefecture. The Kinoshita clan was elevated to the kazoku peerage with the title of viscount in 1884.

The fairy-tale writer Kurushima Takehiko is a descendant of the Kurushima daimyō family.

== Holdings at the end of the Edo period ==
As with most domains in the han system, Mori Domain consisted of several discontinuous territories calculated to provide the assigned kokudaka, based on periodic cadastral surveys and projected agricultural yields, g.

- Bungo Province
  - 3 villages in Hayami District
  - 7 villages in Kusu District
  - 37 villages in Hita District

== List of daimyō ==
#	Name	Tenure	Courtesy title	Court Rank	kokudaka
Kurushima clan, 1601–1871 (Tozama)
1	Kurushima Yasuchika (来島通親(康親))	1601–1612	Emon-no-suke (右衛門佐)	Junior 5th Rank, Lower Grade (従五位下)	14,000 koku
2	Kurushima Michiharu (久留島通春)	1612–1655	Tanba-no-kami (丹波守)	Junior 5th Rank, Lower Grade (従五位下)	14,000 koku
3	Kurushima Michikiyo (久留島通清)	1656–1700	Shinano-no-kami (信濃守)	Junior 5th Rank, Lower Grade (従五位下)	12,500 koku
4	Kurushima Michimasa (久留島通政)	1700–1719	Iyo-no-kami (伊予守)	Junior 5th Rank, Lower Grade (従五位下)	12,500 koku
5	Kurushima Terumichi (久留島光通)	1719–1764	Shinano-no-kami (信濃守)	Junior 5th Rank, Lower Grade (従五位下)	12,500 koku
6	Kurushima Michisuke (久留島通祐)	1764–1791	Shinano-no-kami (信濃守)	Junior 5th Rank, Lower Grade (従五位下)	12,500 koku
7	Kurushima Michitomo (久留島通同)	1791–1798	Izumo-no-kami (出雲守)	Junior 5th Rank, Lower Grade (従五位下)	12,500 koku
8	Kurushima Michihiro (久留島通嘉)	1798–1846	Iyo-no-kami (伊予守)	Junior 5th Rank, Lower Grade (従五位下)	12,500 koku
9	Kurushima Michikata (久留島通容)	1846–1850	Awa-no-kami (安房守)	Junior 5th Rank, Lower Grade (従五位下)	12,500 koku
10	Kurushima Michiaki (久留島通明)	1850–1852	Izumo-no-kami (出雲守)	Junior 5th Rank, Lower Grade (従五位下)	12,500 koku
11	Kurushima Michitane (久留島通胤)	1852–1859	Shinano-no-kami (信濃守)	Junior 5th Rank, Lower Grade (従五位下)	12,500 koku
12	Kurushima Michiyasu (久留島通靖)	1859–1871	Iyo-no-kami (伊予守)	Junior 5th Rank, Lower Grade (従五位下)	12,500 koku

== See also ==
- List of Han
- Abolition of the han system
