= Shime, Fukuoka =

Shime 志免町
- Town
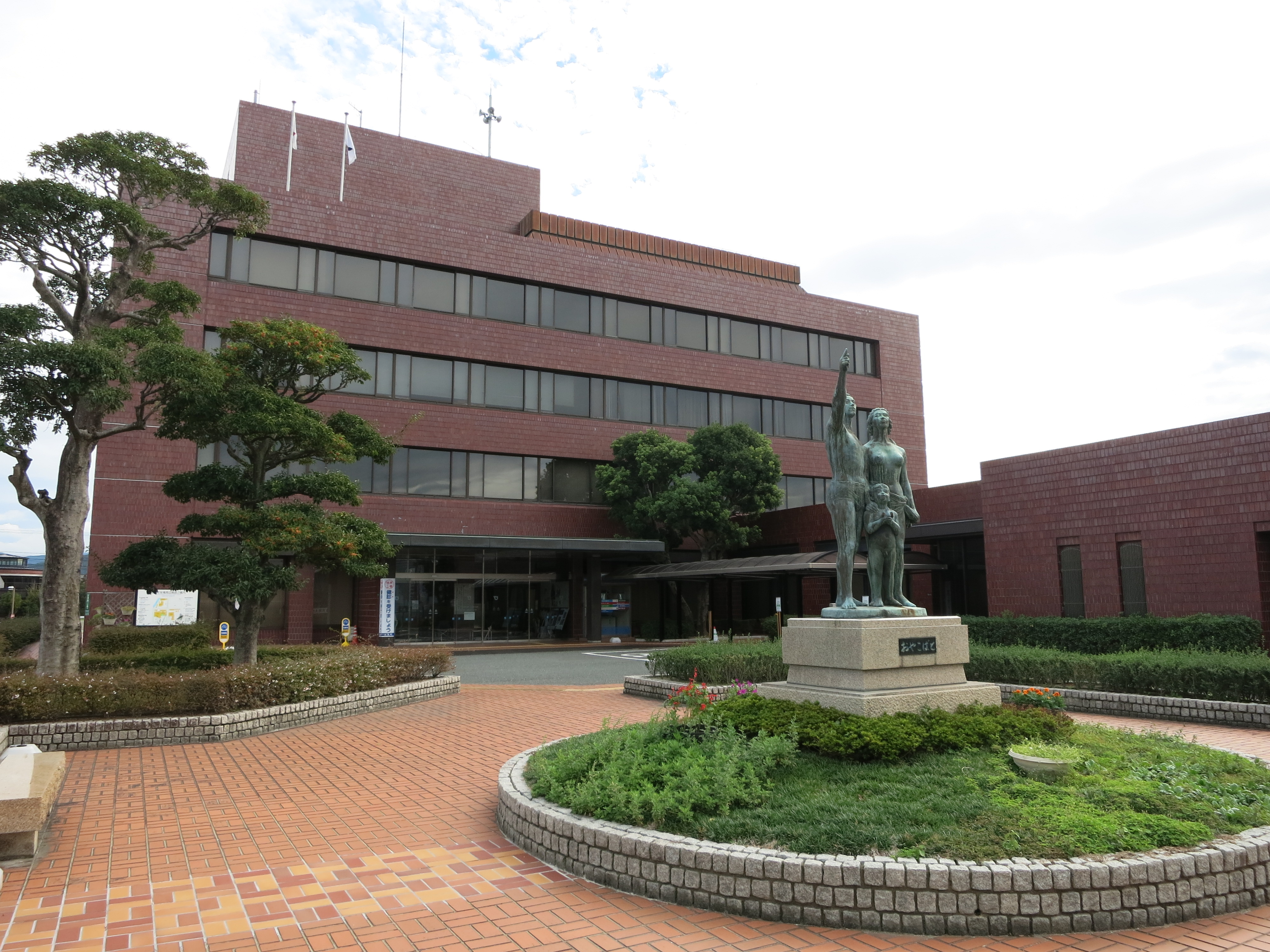
- Shime Town Hall

- Flag Emblem
- Location of Shime in Fukuoka Prefecture

- Location in Japan
- Coordinates: 33°35′29″N 130°28′47″E
- Country: Japan
- Region: Kyushu
- Prefecture: Fukuoka
- District: Kasuya

Area
  - Total: 8.69 km^{2} (3.36 sq mi)

Population (April 1, 2024)
  - Total: 46,388
  - Density: 5,340/km^{2} (13,800/sq mi)
- Time zone: UTC+09:00 (JST)
- City hall address: 1-1-1 Shimen Chuo, Shime-machi, Kasuya-gun, Fukuoka-ken 811-2292
- Website: Official website
- Symbols
- Flower: Sakura

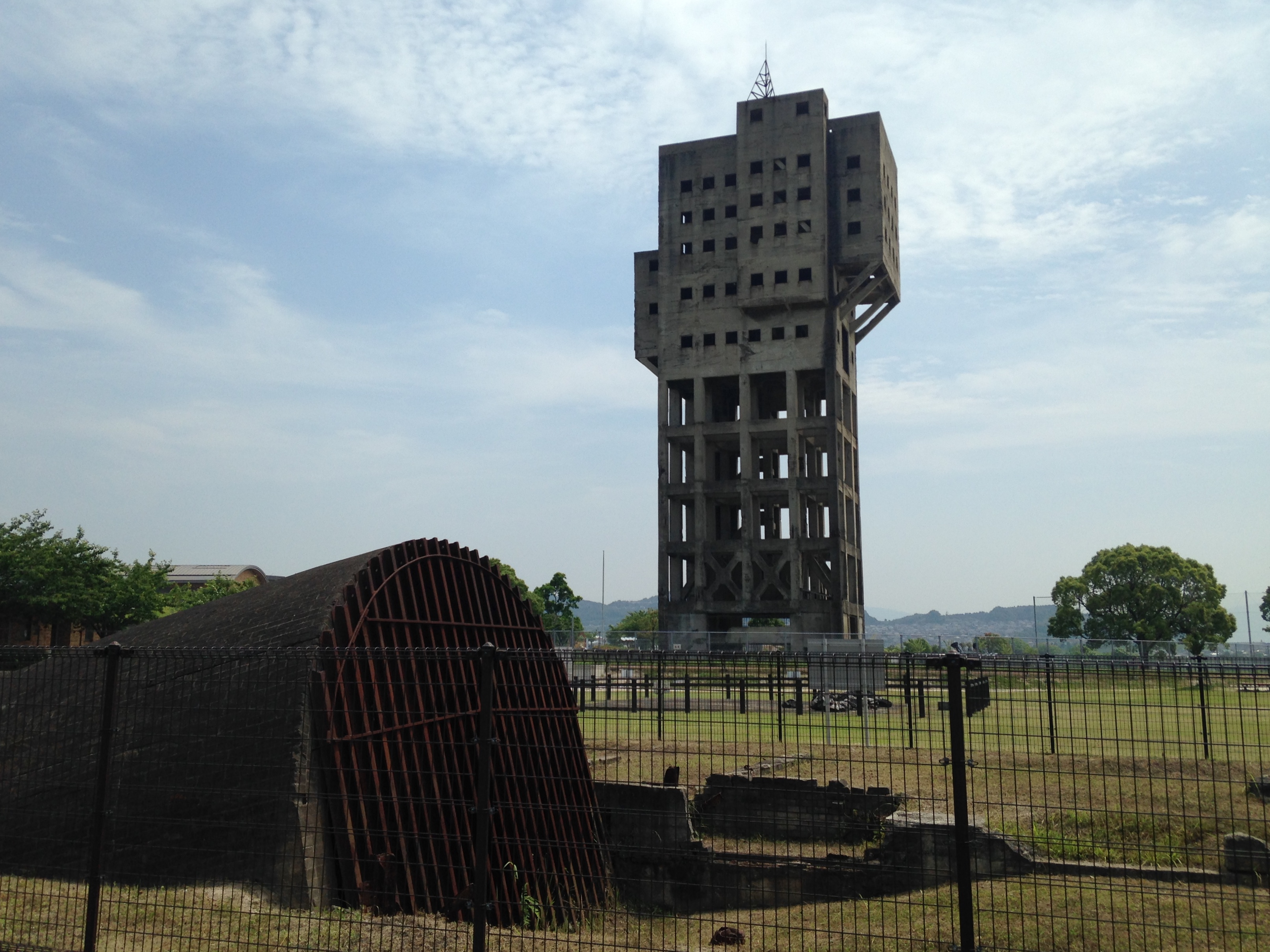
270pxWinding tower and slant entrance of 8th mine of former Shime Coal Mine

Shime (志免町, Shime-machi) is a town located in Kasuya District, Fukuoka Prefecture, Japan. As of 1 April 2024, the town had an estimated population of 46,388 in 21035 households, and a population density of 5300 persons per km². The total area of the town is 8.69 km^{2} (3.36 sq mi)

== Geography ==
Shime is located in northwestern Fukuoka Prefecture. Although there are hilly areas in the southern and western parts of the town, it is generally flat. Almost the entire area has been urbanized.

=== Neighboring municipalities ===
Fukuoka Prefecture

- Fukuoka
- Kasuya
- Sue
- Umi

=== Climate ===
Shime has a humid subtropical climate (Köppen Cfa) characterized by warm summers and cool winters with light to no snowfall. The average annual temperature in Shime is 15.2 °C. The average annual rainfall is 1766 mm with September as the wettest month. The temperatures are highest on average in August, at around 26.5 °C, and lowest in January, at around 4.4 °C.

=== Demographics ===
Per Japanese census data, the population of Shime is as shown below.

Historical population
Year	Pop.	±%
1940	16,172	—
1950	19,158	+18.5%
1960	17,701	−7.6%
1970	21,042	+18.9%
1980	32,241	+53.2%
1990	34,626	+7.4%
2000	37,794	+9.1%
2010	43,571	+15.3%
2020	46,407	+6.5%

== History ==
The area of Shime was part of ancient Chikuzen Province. During the Edo Period, the area was under the control of Fukuoka Domain. After the Meiji restoration, the village of Shime was established with the creation of the modern municipalities system on April 1, 1889. It was elevated to town status on April 17, 1939

== Government ==
Shime has a mayor-council form of government with a directly elected mayor and a unicameral town council of 14 members. Shime, together with the other municipalities in Kasuya District contributes three members to the Fukuoka Prefectural Assembly. In terms of national politics, the town is part of the Fukuoka 4th district of the lower house of the Diet of Japan.

== Economy ==
Shime is located in the center of the Kasuya Coalfield, and the town once had several coal mines and prospered as a coal industry, but the last mine closed in the 1960s. Currently, due to its proximity to Fukuoka City and moderately low land prices, many houses have been built as a commuter town, and the population is increasing.

== Education ==
Shime has four public elementary schools and two public junior high schools operated by the town government. The town does not have a high school.

== Transportation ==
=== Railways ===
Shime has no passenger rail service, but is connected by direct bus to Hakata Station in Fukuoka.

=== Highways ===
Shime is not located on any National Highway or Expressway.

== Local attractions ==
- Tanabataike Kofun, National Historic Site

== Notable people from Kasuya ==
- Yasuko Tomita, Actress
