= Class 12 =

Class 12 or 12 class may refer to:

== Railroading ==
- British Rail Class 12, a British diesel locomotive class
- DRG Class 12, a German steam locomotive class comprising the following eight-coupled, express locomotives operated by the Deutsche Reichsbahn:
  - Class 12.0: BBÖ 214
  - Class 12.1: BBÖ 114
- EAR 12 class, steam locomotive
- Indian locomotive class WAG-12, electric locomotive
- JNR Class C12, steam locomotive
- LSWR A12 class, steam locomotive
- LSWR L12 class, steam locomotive
- MGWR Class 12, steam locomotive
- New South Wales Z12 class locomotive, steam locomotive
- NSB Class 12, steam locomotive
- PKP Class Ol12
- Queensland A12 class locomotive, steam locomotive
- Prussian G 12
- SNCB Type 12, a Belgian steam locomotive
- SNCB Class 12, a Belgian electric locomotive
- Southern Pacific class AC-12, steam locomotive
- VR Class Dm12, railcar
- VR Class Dr12, diesel locomotive
- VR Class Dv12, diesel locomotive

== Other ==
- ARD-12-class floating dry dock
- O 12-class submarine
- Twelfth grade, referred to as "class 12" in India

== See also ==
- Type 12 (disambiguation)
