= Type 12 =

Type 12 may refer to:

- Type 12 frigate, a ship class of three ship classes of the Royal Navy
- Belgian State Railways Type 12, a class of 2-4-2 steam locomotives built 1888–1897
- Datsun Type 12, a car produced by the Nissan corporation
- Porsche Type 12, a German automobile project produced in 1931
- NMBS/SNCB Type 12, a class of 4-4-2 steam locomotives built in 1938–1939
- Type 12 surface-to-ship missile, Japanese surface-to-ship missile
- Type 12 torpedo, Japanese anti-submarine torpedo

== See also ==
- Class 12 (disambiguation)
