= MGWR Class 1 =

Irish rail locomotive type

MGWR Classes 1, 2, 3, 4, 5 and 13
- Class 13 R&W Hawthorn No. 49 at Castlebar
Type and origin
- Power type: Steam
- Builder: Grendon; Fairbairn; Longridge; Hawthorn
- Build date: 1846-1852, 1862 (Note: Refers to all MGWR 2-2-2 locomotives)
Specifications
- Configuration
  - Whyte: 2-2-2
- Gauge: 5 ft 3 in (1,600 mm)
- Driver dia.: 5 ft 7 in (1,700 mm)
- Frame type: inside
- Fuel type: Coke
- Tender cap.: 1,200 imp gal (5,500 L; 1,400 US gal)
- Cylinders: 2
- Cylinder size: 14 in × 18 in (356 mm × 457 mm)
Career
- Operators: Midland Great Western Railway (MGWR)
- Locale: Ireland
- Details for Class 1 (Grendon)

Midland Great Western Railway (MGWR) Classes 1, 2, 3, 4, 5 and 13 were 2-2-2 locomotives acquired over the period 1847-1862 serving the railway in its formative years.

== MGWR Class 1 ==
The MGWR Class 1 were supplied by Thomas Grendon and Company from April 1847 with Dunsandle performing the trials and opening run. These engines were a replacement for a cancelled order from J & R Mallet of Seville Ironworks Dublin and arrived before the earlier order for MGWR Class 2 from Fairbairn. Juno was later converted into a 2-2-2T tank locomotive.

MGWR No.	Name	Introduced	Withdrawn
7	Dunsandle	1847	1871
8	Vesta	1847	1870
9	Venus	1847	1869
10	Luna	1847	1869
11	Juno	1847	1867
30	Pallas	1847	1875
33	Falco	1847	1875

== MGWR Class 2 ==
Fairbairn supplied 6 engines in response to a quote in 1846, the engines being delivered from June 1847. They seem to have accumulated less average mileages than MGWR Class 1 and were all withdrawn within 10 years, apart from Orion which was converted to a tank engine in 1852.

MGWR No.	Name	Introduced	Withdrawn
1	Orion	1847	1860
2	Mars	1847	1856
3	Saturn	1847	1856
4	Mercury	1847	1856
5	Jupiter	1847	1856
6	Sirius	1847	1856

== MGWR Class 3 ==
The six MGWR Class 3 locomotives were also supplied by Fairbairn in 1848. Built to a different design, they had a longer service life than the Fairbairn Class 2.

MGWR No.	Name	Introduced	Withdrawn
12	Heron	1848	1873
13	Condor	1848	1873
14	Petrel	1848	1875
15	Pelican	1848	1873
16	Cygnet	1848	1873
17	Ouzel→Snipe	1848	1875

== MGWR Class 4 ==
The MGWR Class 4 from Fairbairn were 2-2-2 Well Tank locomotives ordered for the MGWR's Galway extension in 1851. One of the original order of four was believed to have been sent to Brazil. They had a long service life of nearly 50 years, with some remaining in use as stationary boilers up to 1906.

MGWR No.	Name	Introduced	Withdrawn
27	Fairy→Bee	1851	1897
28	Titania→Elf	1851	1897
29	Ariel→Fairy	1851	1897

== MGWR Class 5 ==
With the exception of Class 13, all subsequent locomotive builds for the MGWR were of engines with the driving wheels connected by coupling rods for better adhesion. The MGWR Class 5 engines were themselves rebuilt as 2-4-0s beforce withdrawal and renumbered in the range 88-93.

MGWR No.	Name	Introduced	Withdrawn
18	Eclipse	1851	1880
19	Childers	1851	1872
20	Arabian	1851	1873
21	Voltiguer	1851	1873
22	Harpaway	1852	1873
23	Birdcatcher	1852	1873

== MGWR Class 13 ==
The final set of six 2-2-2 passenger locomotives for the MGWR designated Class 13 built by R and W Hawthorn of Leith, Scotland. They had double-sandwich frames, outside springs and 15 in × 22 in (381 mm × 559 mm) cylinders. Their driving wheels were the largest of any MGWR 2-2-2 locomotive, being 6 feet 6 inches (1.98 m) in diameter. They were renumbered 43-48 between 1871 and 1873, switching the number range with MGWR Class 12 so all passenger engines could be numbered 1 to 48. Their final years saw them displaced from main line to branch services.

MGWR No.	Name	Maker No.	Introduced	Withdrawn	Renumber (Note: Assumes name remained with same engine with early 1870s renumbering)
49	Queen	1170	1862	1880/5	45
50	Viceroy	1171	1862	1884/7	47
51	Leinster	1172	1862	1886	43
52	Munster	1173	1862	1884/7	46
53	Ulster	1174	1862	1886/7	44
54	Connaught	1175	1862	1887	48

== Sources ==
- Shepherd, Ernie (1994). The Midland Great Western Railway of Ireland – An illustrated History. Midland Publishing Limited. ISBN 1-85780-008-7.
- Ahrons, E. L. (1954). L. L. Asher (ed.). Locomotive and train working in the latter part of the nineteenth century. Vol. six. W Heffer & Sons Ltd.
