= Marshall valve gear =

Marshall valve gear may refer to:

- Marshall valve gear, a modified Hackworth valve gear, patented in 1879 by Marshall, Sons & Co.
- J. T. Marshall valve gear, any of several valve gears invented by James Thompson Marshall

== See also ==
- Valve gear
