= Zündapp Bella =

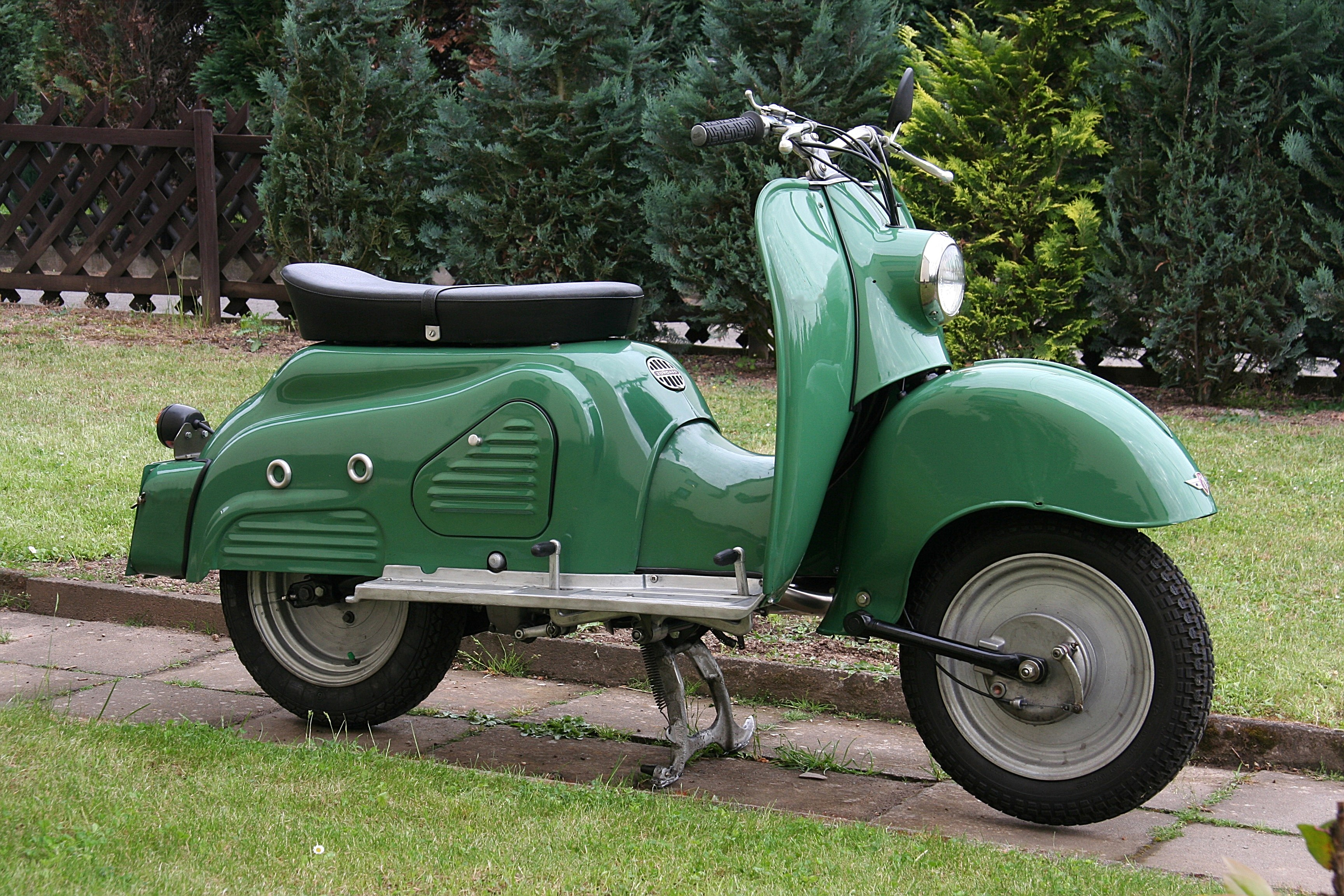
- 1958 Zündapp Bella R 154
- Manufacturer: Zündapp
- Production: 1953–1964
- Class: Scooter
- Engine: 146 or 198 cc 8.9 or 12.1 cu in two-stroke, air-cooled, single;
- Bore / stroke: 150: 57 mm × 58 mm 2.2 in × 2.3 in 200: 64 mm × 62 mm 2.5 in × 2.4 in
- Compression ratio: 150: 6.7:1; 200: 6.3:1
- Top speed: 150: 50 mph (80 km/h); 200: 75 mph (121 km/h)
- Power: 150: 7.3 hp (5.4 kW) @ 4700 rpm 200: 10 hp (7.5 kW) @ 5200 rpm
- Transmission: 4 speed manual, primary chain drive, final chain drive
- Frame type: tubular steel
- Suspension: front: leading link, single spring on left rear: swingarm with coil springs and dampers
- Tyres: 3.50" X 12"
- Wheelbase: 51.5 in (1,308 mm)
- Dimensions: L: 78 in (1,981 mm); W: 24 in (610 mm)
- Weight: 150: 302 lb (137 kg); 200: 322 lb (146 kg) (dry)

The Zündapp Bella is a motor scooter manufactured by German motorcycle manufacturer Zündapp from 1953 to 1964. Approximately 130,000 Bella scooters were sold, with engine sizes ranging from 150 to 200 cc (9.2 to 12.2 cu in).

The design of the Bella was heavily influenced by that of the Parilla Levriere, also known as the Parilla Greyhound. Along with being similar in general appearance, both designs have prominent air tunnels along the centreline of the scooter to allow fresh air to cool the engine without a fan.

As introduced in 1953, the Bella had a 146 cc two-stroke single cylinder engine, 12 inch wheels, 6 V electrics, a kick starter, and an undamped telescopic fork. The fuel tank was mounted under the seat.

A version of the Bella called the Suburbanette was made for the United States market from 1953 to 1954. The Suburbanette was stripped of the body panels enclosing the engine. 370 Suburbanettes were sold. An export version of the last 150cc Bella, the R154K (K for kickstarter), with higher "Western" (buckhorn) bars and no dynastarter, came to the United States in the later 1950s.

A 197 cc (12.0 cu in) engine producing 10 hp (7.5 kW) became available in May 1954. The front suspension was later changed from a telescopic fork to an Earles-type leading link fork with a single suspension unit on left side of the fork. Later Bella scooters also had 12V electricals powered by two 6V batteries. Electric starters also became available on the Bella with the electrical-generator also functioning as the starter-motor.

The Bella was imported into the United Kingdom by Ambassador Motorcycles, and into the United States by International Motorcycle Company.

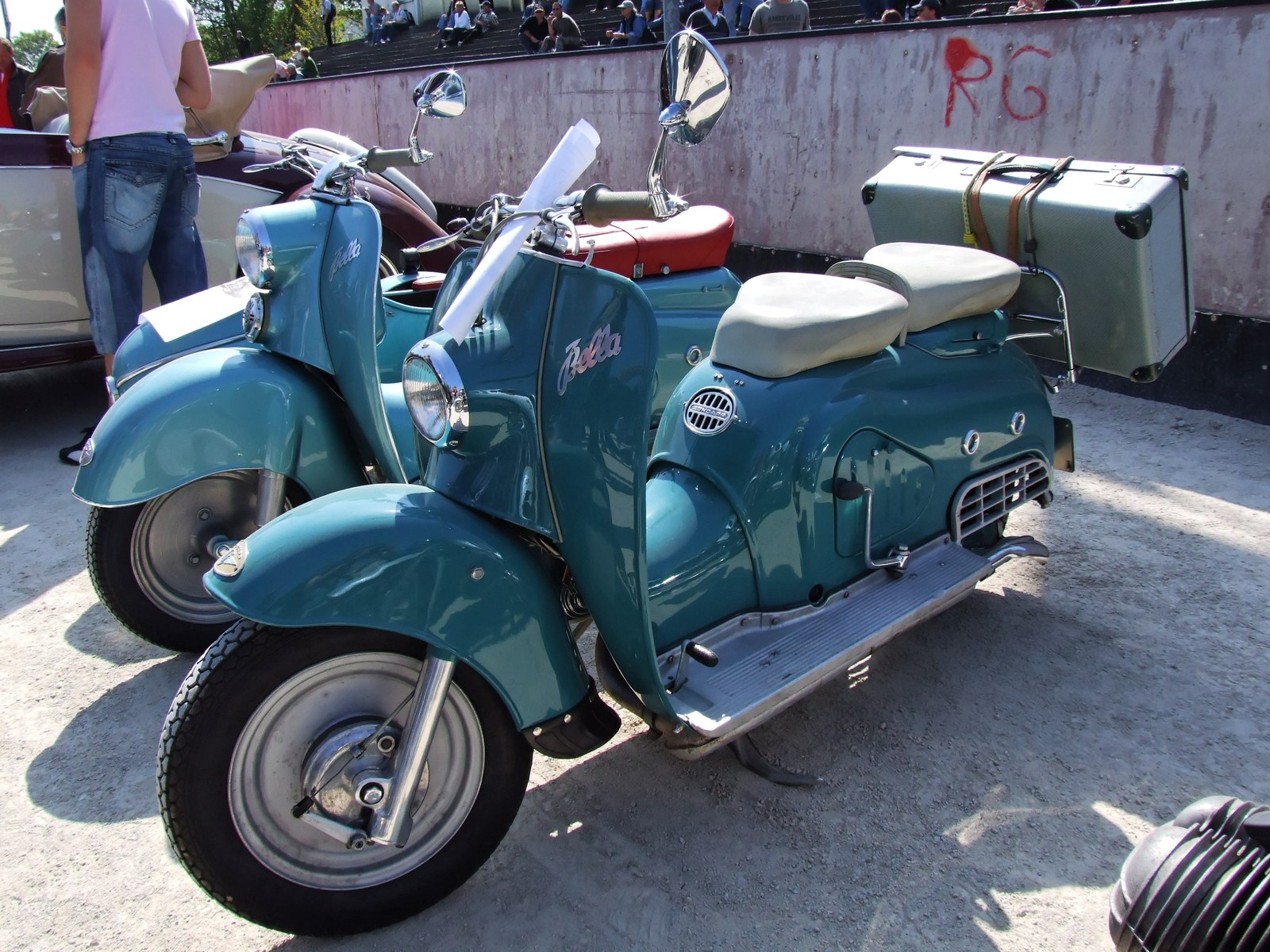
Early Bella with kick starter and telescopic fork

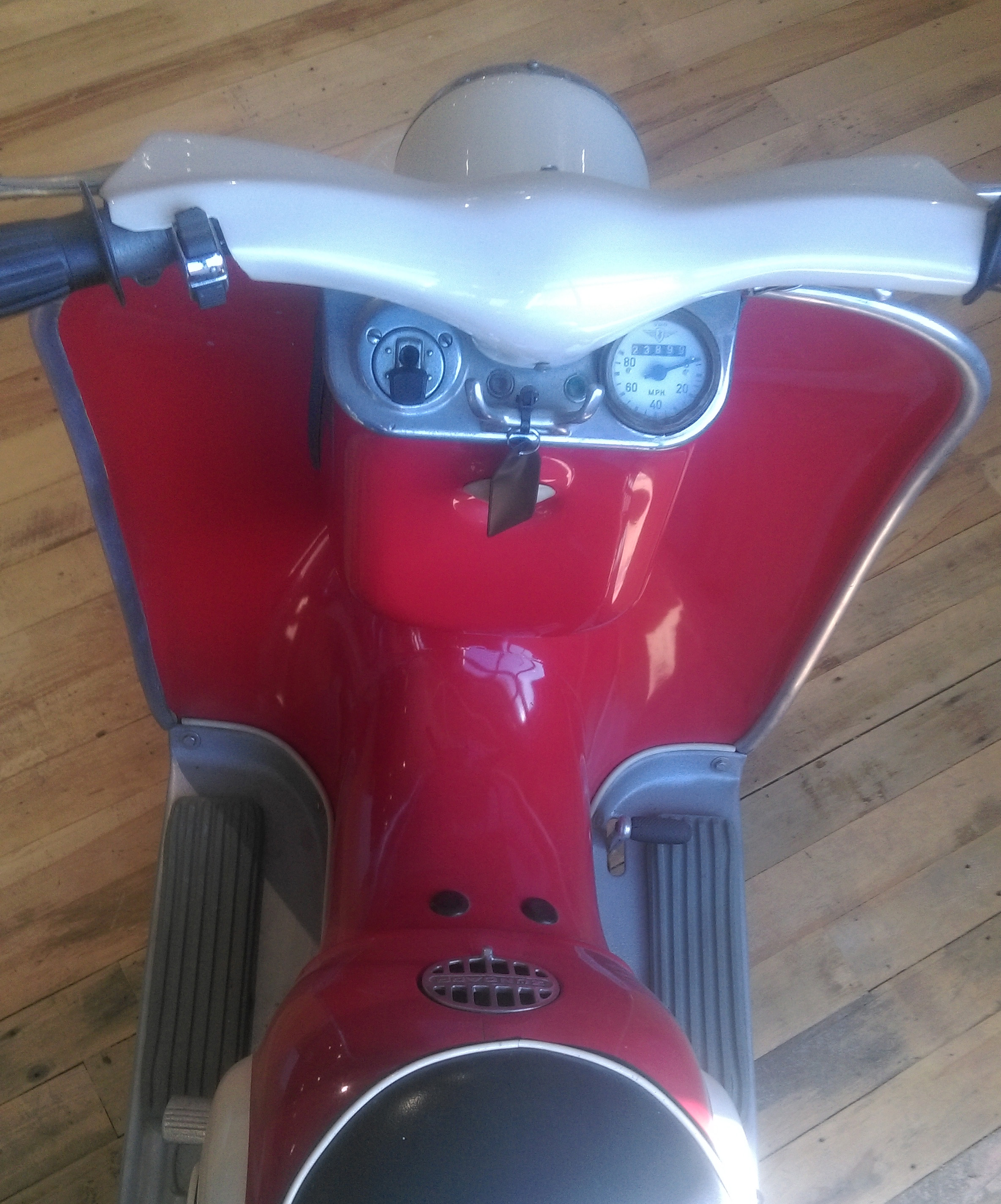
Dashboard

== See also ==
- List of motorcycles of the 1950s
