= Zündapp =

German motorcycle manufacturer

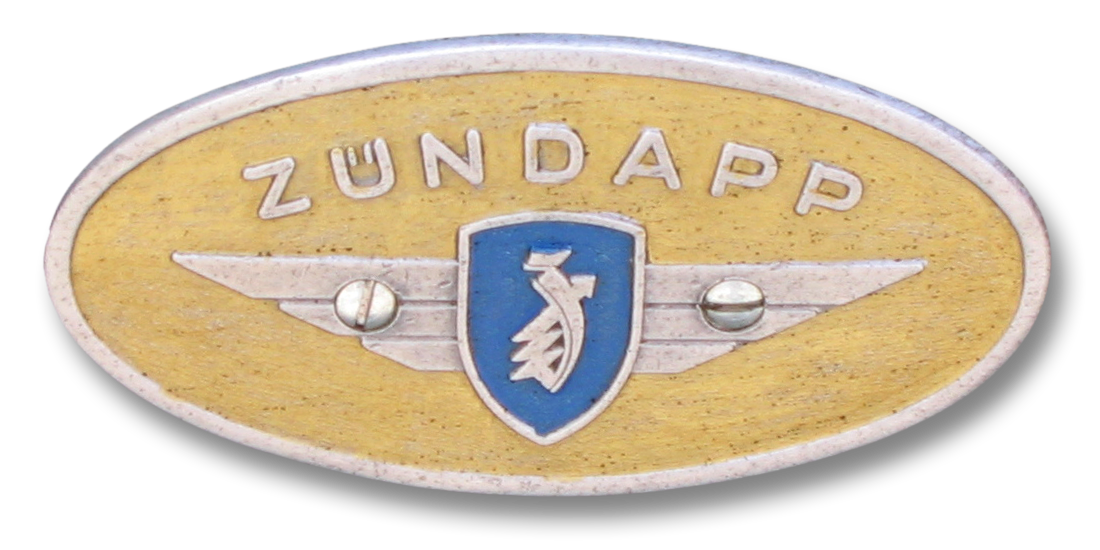
- Industry: Machine tools, motor vehicles
- Founded: 1917; 109 years ago
- Defunct: 1984; 42 years ago
- Headquarters: Germany
- Products: Detonators, motorcycles, microcars, sewing machines, mopeds

Zündapp (a.k.a. Zuendapp) was a major German motorcycle manufacturer founded in 1917 in Nuremberg by Fritz Neumeyer, together with the Friedrich Krupp AG and the machine tool manufacturer Thiel under the name "Zünder- und Apparatebau G.m.b.H." as a producer of detonators (Zünder- und Apparatebau is German for Igniter and Apparatus Building/Assembly). In 1919, as the demand for weapons parts declined after World War I, Neumeyer became the sole proprietor of the company, and two years later he diversified into the construction of motorcycles.

Following World War II, Zündapp expanded into the microcar, moped and scooter markets. The company collapsed in 1984.

== Early history: 1919–45 ==
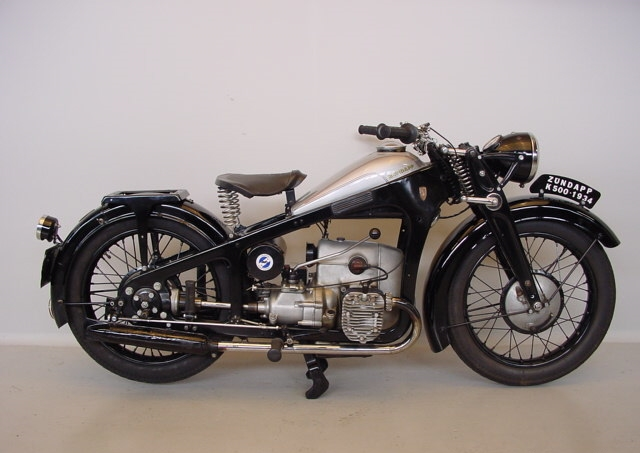
1934 Zündapp flat twin K500 shaft-drive motorcycle

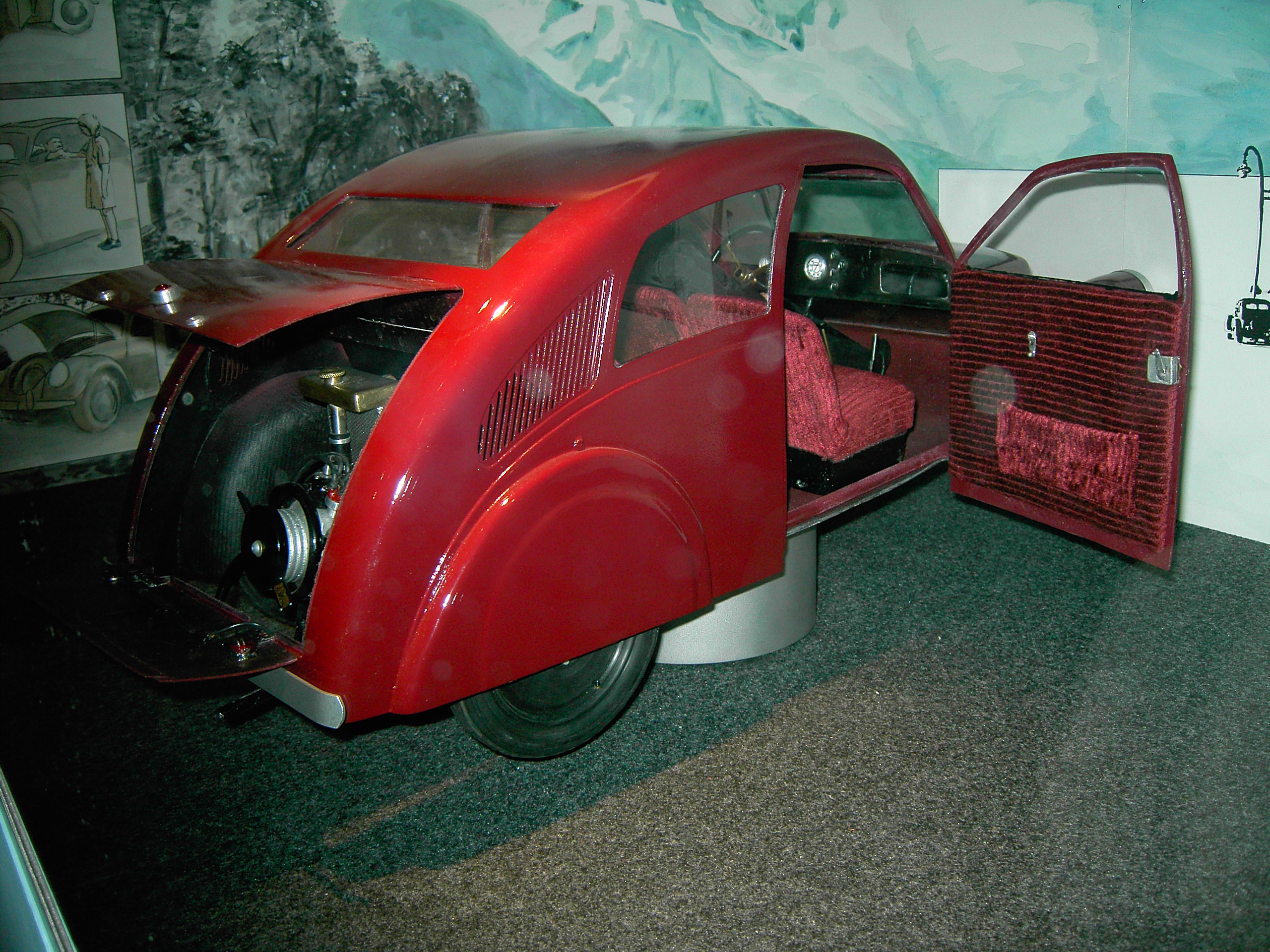
A reconstruction of a Porsche model type 12, Museum for Industrial Culture, Nuremberg

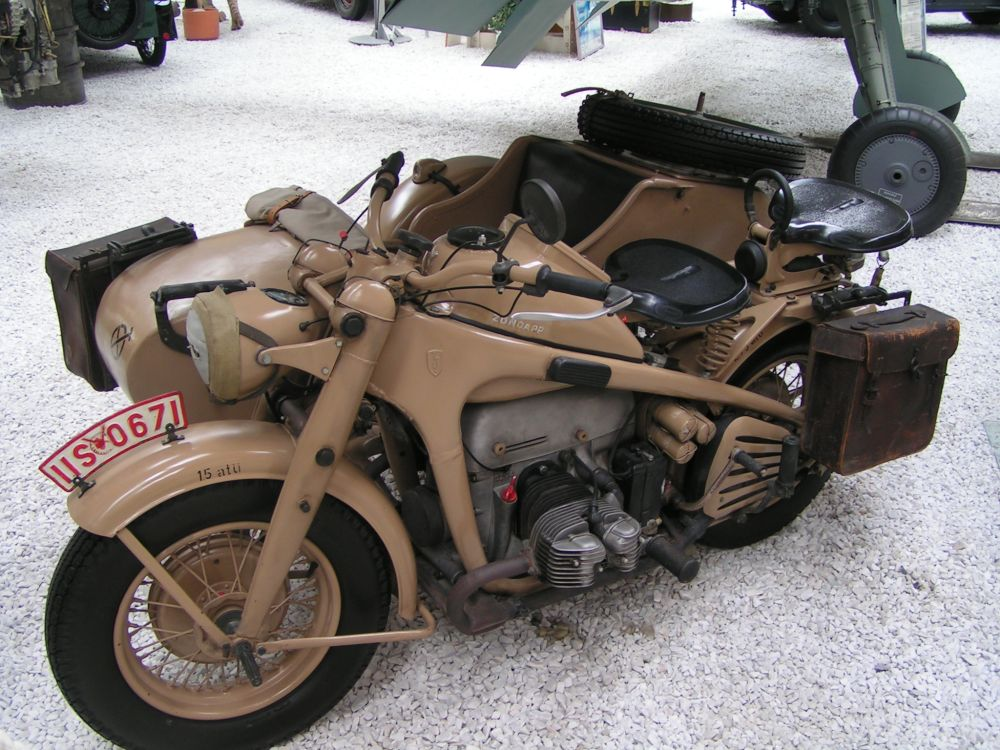
A Zündapp KS750 Wehrmacht sidecar from the 1940s

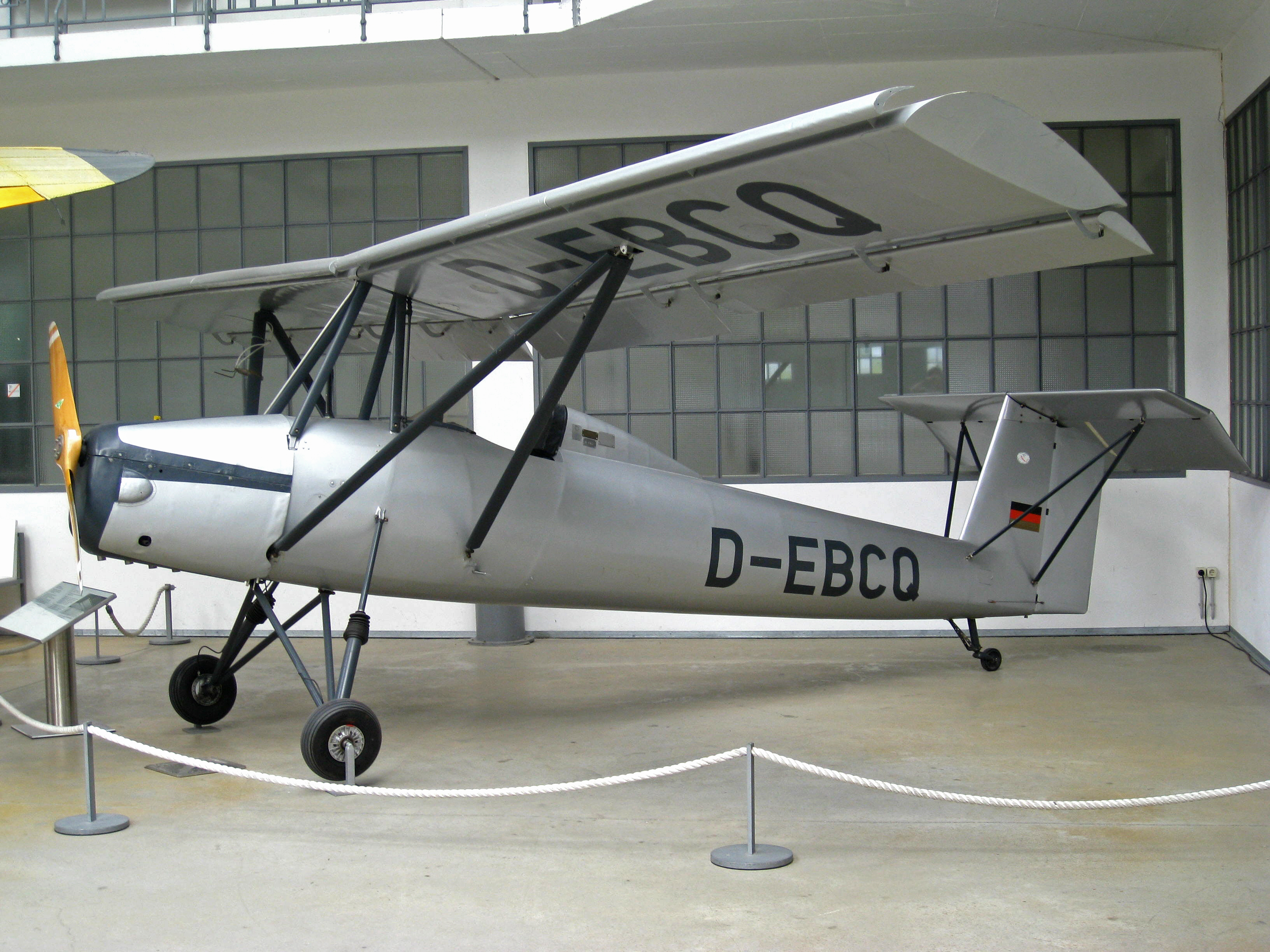
Z9-92 powered LF-1 trainer

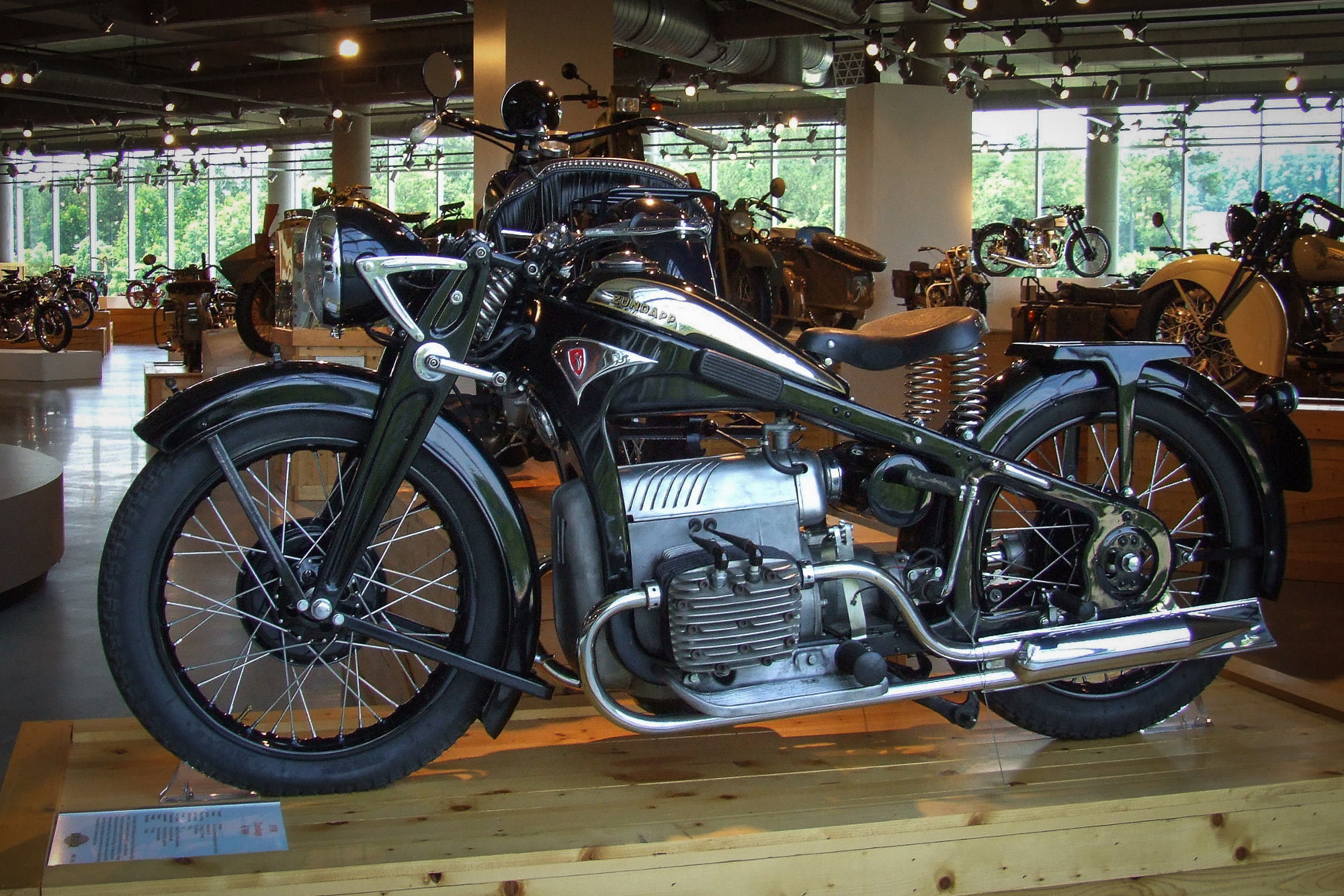
A 1938 Zündapp K800 on display at the Barber Vintage Motorsport Museum in Birmingham, Alabama

The first Zündapp motorcycle was the model Z22 in 1921. This was the Motorrad für Jedermann ("motorcycle for everyone"), a simple, reliable design that was produced in large series. Zündapp's history of heavy motorcycles began in 1933 with the K-series. The "K" refers to the type of drivetrain that these models used, Kardanantrieb, meaning enclosed driveshaft with two universal joints. Zündapp introduced the enclosed crankcase (then a novelty). The series encompassed models from 200 to 800 cc displacement and was a major success, increasing Zündapp's market share in Germany from 5% in 1931 to 18% in 1937.

The Zündapp KS600, first released in 1938, had a 28 hp (21 kW) horizontally opposed twin cylinder engine with overhead valves displacing 597 cc (36.4 cu in). The KS600 was often coupled with a Steib sidecar, the BW38 (Beiwagen 1938). The BW38, fitted with the B1 (Boot no. 1) sidecar body was produced between 1938 and 1941 and supplied exclusively to the Wehrmacht. While the KS600 was discontinued and eventually replaced by the purpose-built KS750, its motor was to be the only remnant to live beyond the destruction of war. When Zündapp returned to motorcycle production in the late 1940s, it chose to reuse the KS600's motor to power the KS601 with few modifications.

The Zündapp K800 had unit construction, flat-four engines with shaft drive (a layout adopted by Honda for the Gold Wing in 1974), and were the only 4-cylinder machines used by the German armed forces in World War II.

From 1931 Ferdinand Porsche and Zündapp developed the type 12 prototype Auto für Jedermann ("car for everyone"), which was the first time the name Volkswagen was used. Porsche preferred the 4-cylinder flat engine, but Zündapp used a water-cooled 5-cylinder radial engine. In 1932 three prototypes were running. All three cars were lost during the war, the last in a 1945 Stuttgart bombing raid.

From 1936 to 1938 Zündapp produced the KKS500 model. This was the first Zündapp with a foot gear change, and 170 examples were built. From 1940 onward Zündapp produced more than 18,000 units of the Zündapp KS 750. This is a sidecar outfit with a driven side wheel and a locking differential, supplied to the German Wehrmacht.

Zündapp also made aircraft engines including the 9-092, which was used in light aircraft, including the Braunschweig LF-1 Zaunkönig (1942) ab initio trainer aircraft.

== Postwar: 1945–1984 ==
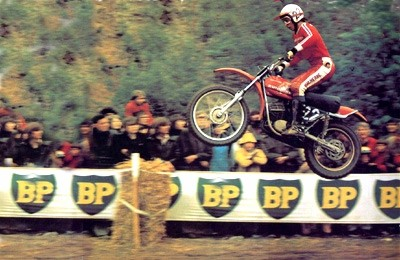
André Malherbe in 1974 aboard a 125 cc Zündapp

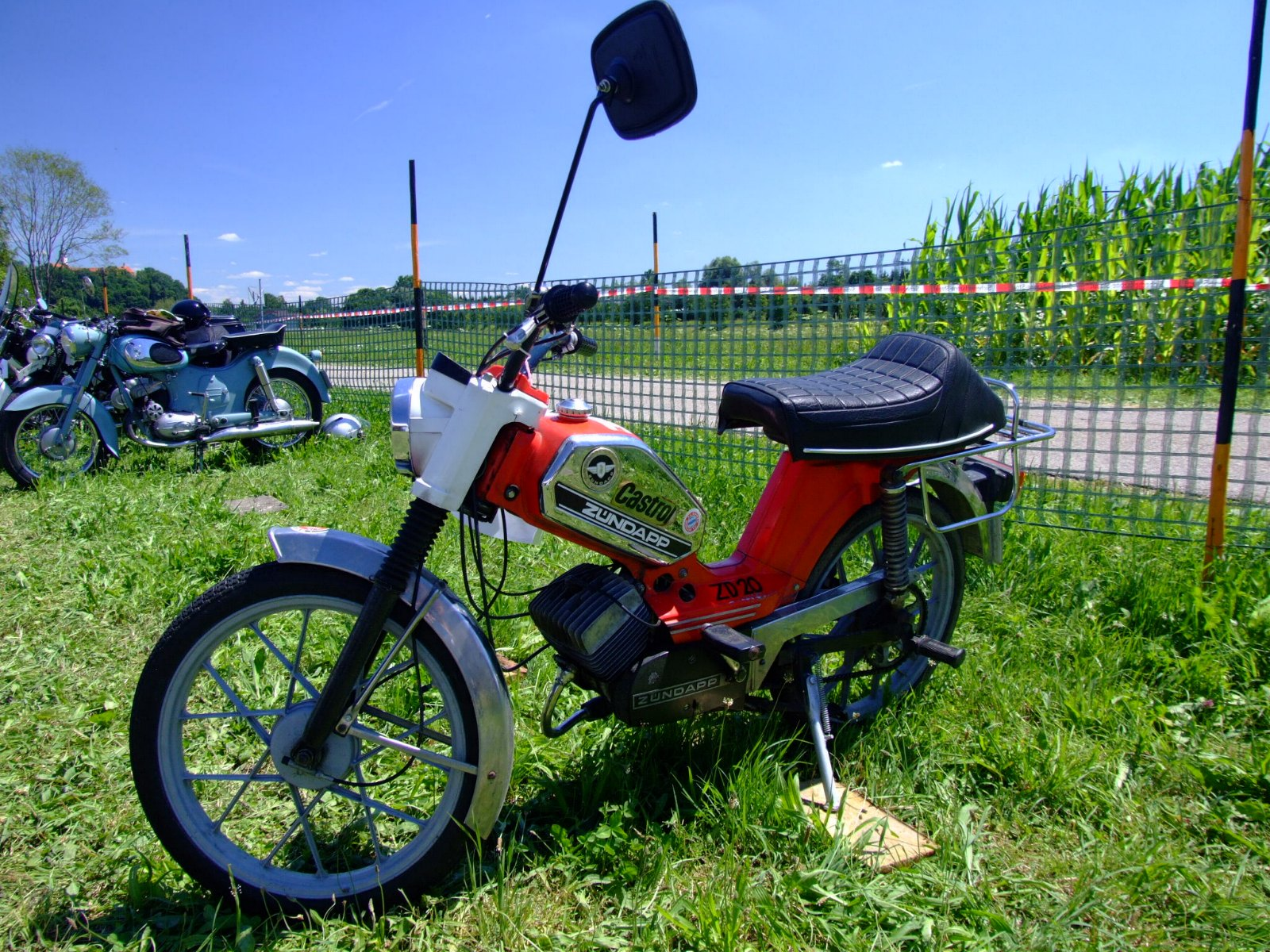
Zündapp ZD20 1977

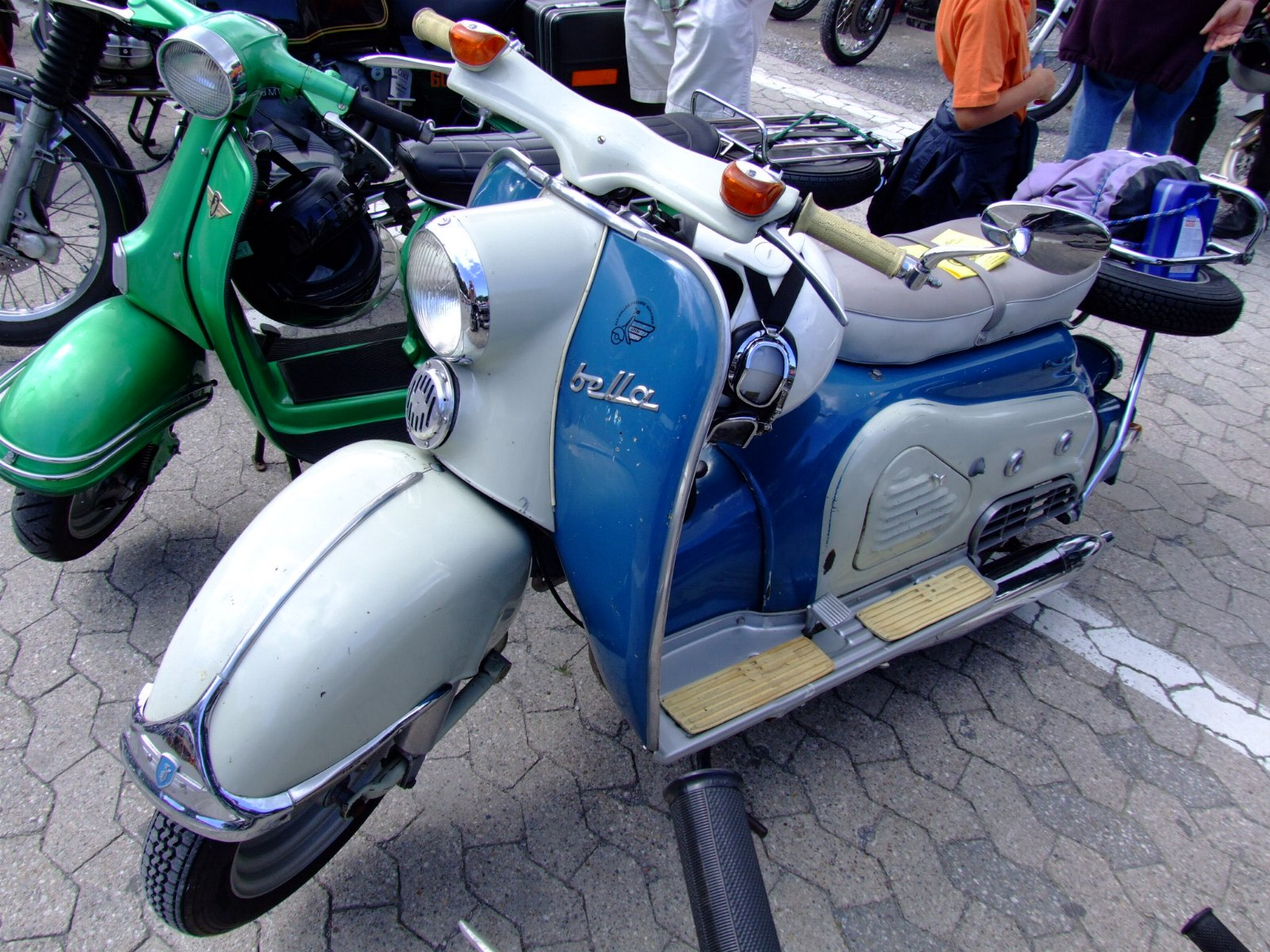
Zündapp Bella scooter

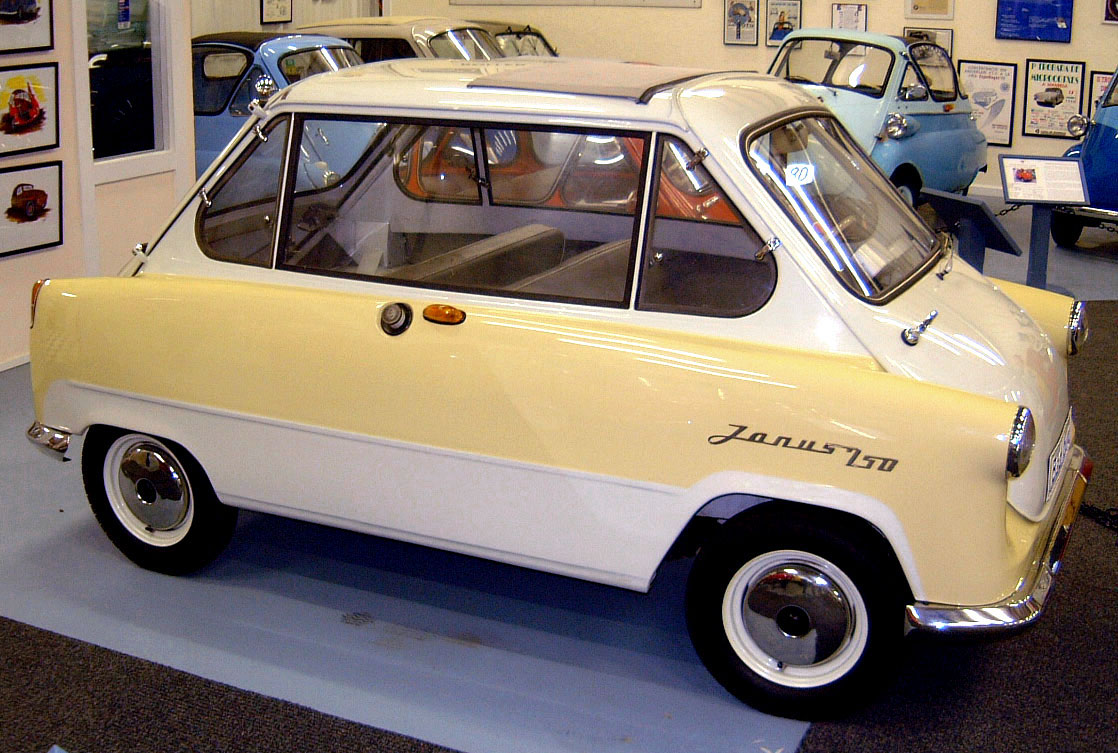
Zündapp Janus microcar

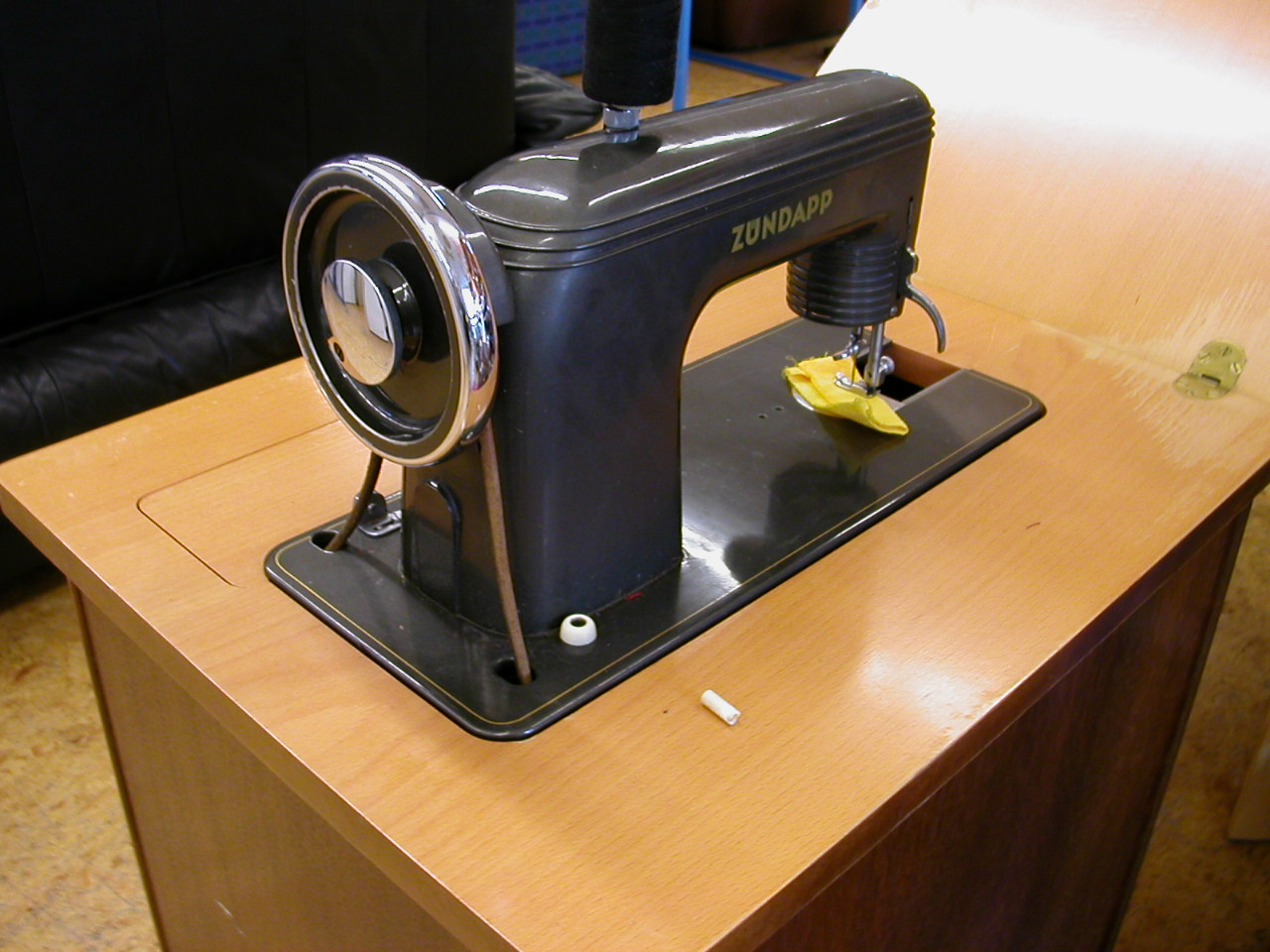
A Zündapp sewing machine

After World War II the company transitioned to smaller machines, notably the "Bella" motor scooter, which was a relatively heavy machine for its type. In 1951 Zündapp released the last of its heavy motorcycle models, but one of its most famous: the KS601 (the "green elephant") with a 598 cc two-cylinder engine. From 1957 to 1958 the company also produced the Zündapp Janus microcar.

In 1958 the company moved from Nuremberg to Munich. Subsequently, the company developed several new smaller models, discontinued the development of four-stroke engines and only produced two-stroke models. Zündapp experienced enormous success in off-road motorsports winning thousands of Gold-Silver and bronze medals, many Championships. The American rider Dave Ekins won an overall victory at the 1967 Greenhorn Enduro aboard a 100cc Zündapp, defeating competitors on much larger motorcycles. Belgian rider André Malherbe rode a Zündapp to win the 125cc European motocross championships in 1973 and again in 1974. Initially, Zündapp scooters and mopeds sold well, but later sales declined and in 1984 the company went bankrupt and closed. New legislation had destroyed the market for Zündapps high-speed 50 cc "Kleinkrafträder": to reduce noise and to reduce the accidents especially young riders had on those bikes, the new "80 cc" class was introduced. That made it much easier especially for the Japanese manufacturers to break into the previously protected market as they could easily downsize the 125 cc engines. Kreidler shared Zündapp's fate and went insolvent in 1982.

== Post bankruptcy ==
After the bankruptcy, the entire production line and intellectual properties were bought by Xunda Motor Co., Tianjin, China. They produced small Zündapp motorcycles from 1987 until the early 1990s. Zündapp later produced Honda-based four-stroke motorcycles and electric mopeds in the 2010s.

Zündapp also had a technical collaboration with Royal Enfield (India) to build mopeds and motorcycles. A dedicated factory was built at Ranipet near Madras (now Chennai) in the early 1980s to manufacture small, lightweight two-stroke motorcycles to be offered along with their flagship Royal Enfield Bullet. Enfield launched two 50 cc motorcycles first, the step-thru Silver Plus and the three-speed Explorer motorcycle. Later, Enfield Fury 175 (based on Zündapp KS175) was introduced as a performance motorcycle. It had five-speed gearbox, a hydraulic Brembo disc brake and a sleeveless hard chromed cylinder barrel, all were a first on a motorcycle in that country. That being said, sales of these models were very low in the country.

In 2017, the Zündapp name returned to German hands after being purchased by Dieter Neumeyer, the grandson of company founder Fritz Neumeyer. The newly owned company subsequently produced e-bicycles and later revealed a new motorcycle concept, the ZXA 500 Adventure, at the 2022 Intermot Show in Cologne.
