= Royal Enfield Silver Plus =

Indian two-seater, step-through motorcycle

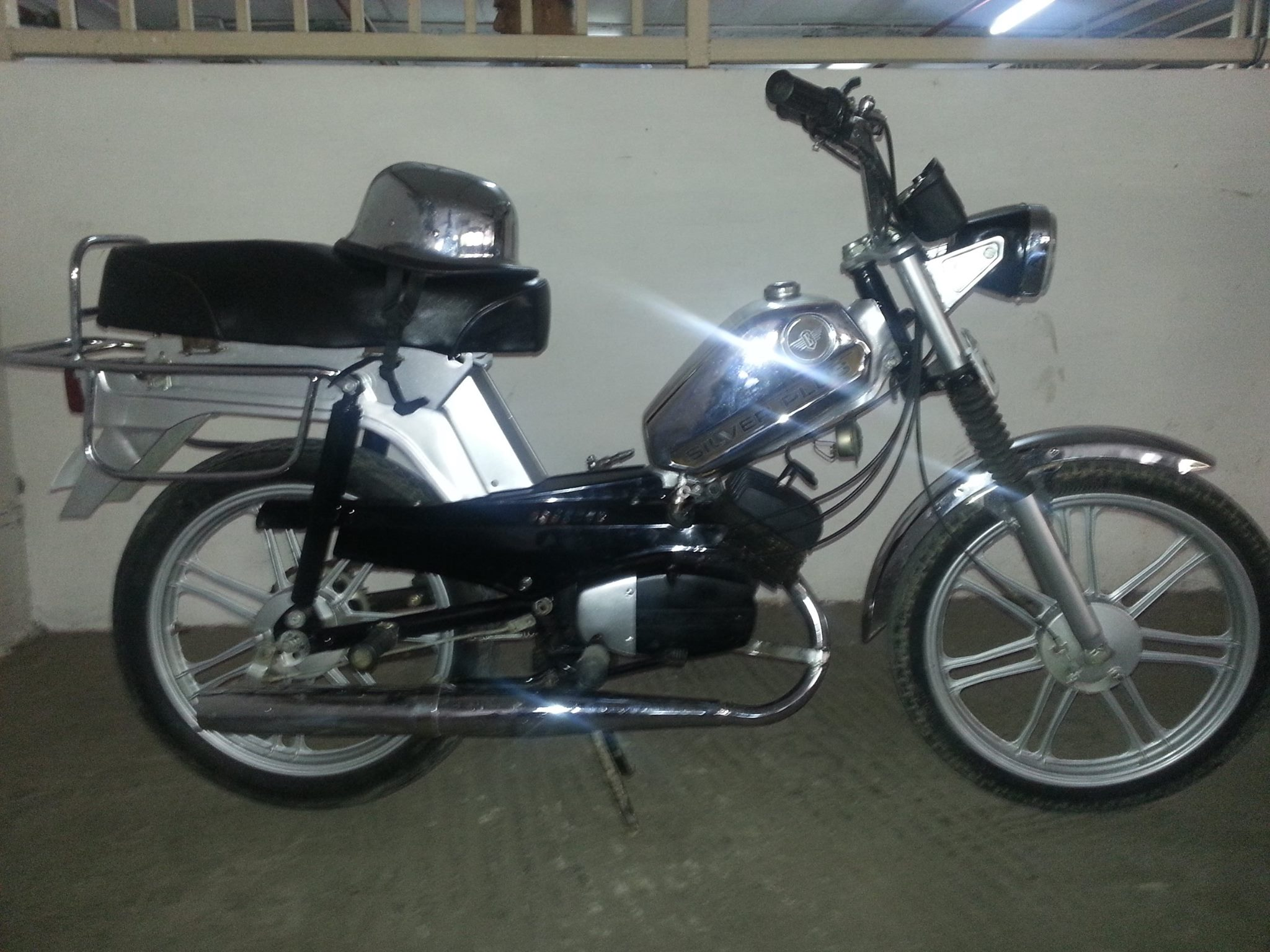
Silver Plus

Silver plus is a two-seater, step-through motorcycle that was introduced by Royal Enfield Motors in India in the 1980s. It was one of the first geared step-through motorcycles in India. It was launched along with Explorer, another mini bike, a two-seater that featured the same engine. While Silver Plus featured a hand-operated cable link gear shift, Explorer used a foot-operated gear shift.

== Engine, transmission and performance ==
The Silver Plus was powered by a two-stroke, 49 cc air-cooled, carburetor engine, manufactured with technical assistance from Zundapp. The transmission supported two gears and the gears are operated by hand, much like the Italian scooters. Royal Enfield subsequently upgraded the bike to a three-speed gearbox.
