= Zündapp KS 750 =

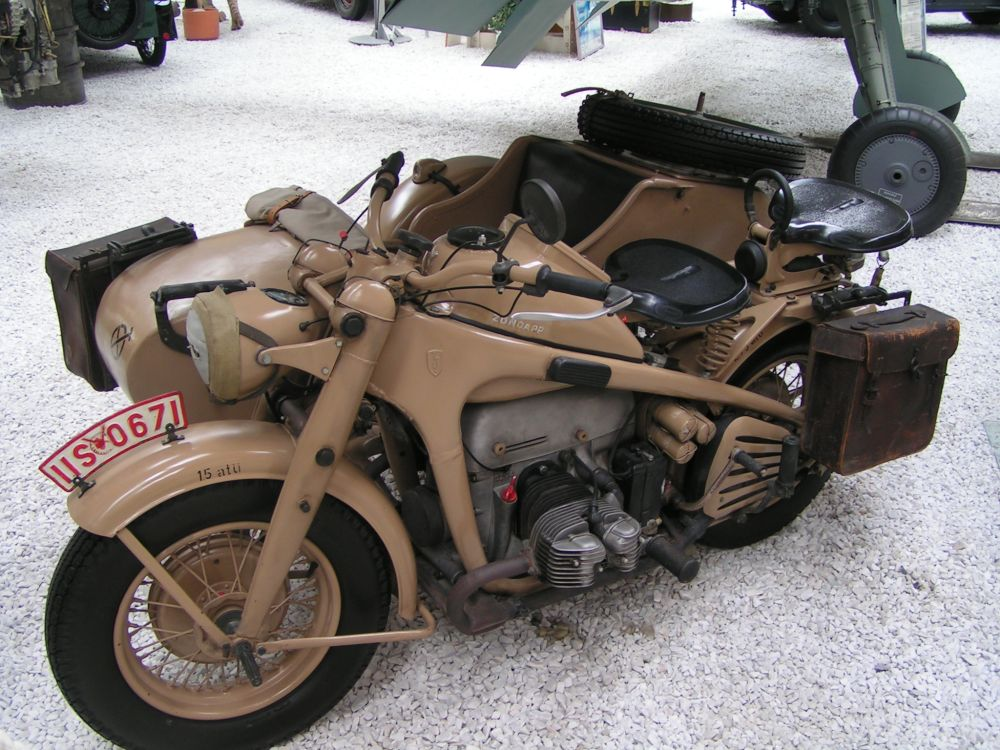
- Zündapp KS 750 in Technik Museum Speyer
- Type: Motorcycle/Motorcycle combination
- Place of origin: Nazi Germany

Service history
- In service: 1941–1945
- Used by: Germany
- Wars: World War II

Production history
- Designed: 1939
- Manufacturer: Zündapp
- Produced: 1941–1944
- No. built: 18,695

Specifications
- Engine: 751cc four-stroke flat-twin petrol engine
- Drive: two-wheel - to both rear wheel and sidecar wheel
- Transmission: 5 forward, 1 reverse gearbox

The Zündapp KS 750 is a World War II-era motorcycle and sidecar combination developed for the German Wehrmacht (armed forces) before and during the Second World War, by the German company Zündapp G.m.b.H. After entering service in 1941, over 18,000 were built through 1944, and deployed on all major German battlefronts, for use in a variety of roles. The KS 750 was an integral design, featuring not one but two driven wheels – both the rear wheel and the sidecar wheel were shaft driven, powered by a 751 cc (45.8 cu in) (bore 75mm, stroke 85mm), overhead valve, flat twin engine.

== Development ==
In 1937, the German Oberkommando des Heeres ('OKH' or Army High Command) requested the development of a motorcycle with the following criteria:

- A payload of 500 kg (1,100 lb), corresponding to three fully equipped soldiers.
- A fully loaded sustainable speed of 80 km/h (50 mph) on the Autobahn and a 95 km/h (59 mph) maximum speed. The minimum speed had to be 4 km/h (2.5 mph), to accompany marching troops.
- 4.5 x 16 in (410 mm) cross country tires should be used.
- A minimum ground clearance of 150 mm (5.9 in) and enough clearance under the mudguards in order to use snow chains.
- A substantial off-road capability, including fording shallow waters and climbing steep inclines.

Up until then all motorcycles used by the German military derived from civilian models, but the needs of a fast moving Blitzkrieg doctrine military meant that no money should be spared for the creation of a motorcycle and sidecar combination that had to be extremely versatile, capable and dependable. In 1944, production of the Zündapp KS 750 was however discontinued because of its high cost.

Initially Zündapp considered modifying their KS 600 model in order to meet the OKH demands, but it was soon clear that the KS 600 was not suitable for further development: the frame, engine, transmission, front fork and many other parts would have to be either reinforced or receive substantial modifications to meet the new criteria. Eventually Zündapp came to the conclusion that what they needed was a new, purpose-built motorcycle and sidecar. By 1939 they had developed two prototypes, which the OKH used for test drives. In both bikes the cubic capacity was increased to 700 cc and the cylinders were lifted on each side by 5° to increase ground clearance. Subsequently, the cubic capacity was further increased to 751 cc.

Furthermore, a locking differential was fitted, to split torque effectively in very tough terrain. Some units were built with eight-speed dual-ratio transmission, including reverse gear customary on sidecars. Equipment included a spare wheel, holders for ammunition cases and gasolene canister, plus a tow bar for a trailer.

The OKH's call for the new motorcycle was also met by BMW, which produced their experimental BMW R75. After long test drives both with the BMW and Zündapp prototypes the OKH determined that the Zündapp KS 750 was superior to the BMW R75. Initially BMW was asked to build the Zündapp KS 750, but BMW refused. However, the OKH asked BMW to adopt the superior characteristics of the Zündapp KS 750, such as the rear wheel drive solution, the hydraulic brake system and wheels. Moreover, BMW and Zündapp also agreed, as demanded by the OKH, to standardize as many components as possible, in order to both streamline production, as well as logistics and (field) maintenance / repairs, through interchangeable spare parts, usable on both models.

Development continued until 1940. Eventually seven bikes were used for longer test drives and to refine the last details. In April 1940 the OKH confirmed full acceptance of the Zündapp KS 750, and despite the satisfaction with the early production models, Zündapp kept including improvements throughout production.

The series production started in the spring of 1941, and in eight years Zündapp produced 18,695 KS 750 in their Nuernberg factory. Military production of the Zündapp KS 750 stopped in early 1945. Production resumed in 1946 for the Finnish Army and the civilian market.

== Service ==
The KS 750 was used on the Eastern Front (1941–1945) against the USSR, in the North African campaign (1940–1943) and the Italian Campaign (World War II) against British Commonwealth and US.

== Production ==
Production year	Units produced	Serial numbers
1939	2	pre-series, no serial number
1940	7	600 000 – 600 006
1941	288	600 007 – 600 295
1942	7,228	600 296 – 607 523
1943	7,131	607 524 – 614 654
1944	3,515	614 655 – 618 169
1945	115	618 170 – 618 284
1946	205	620 001 – N/A
1947	76	N/A
1948	68	N/A – 620 349
