= James Thompson Marshall =

British engineer (1854–1931)

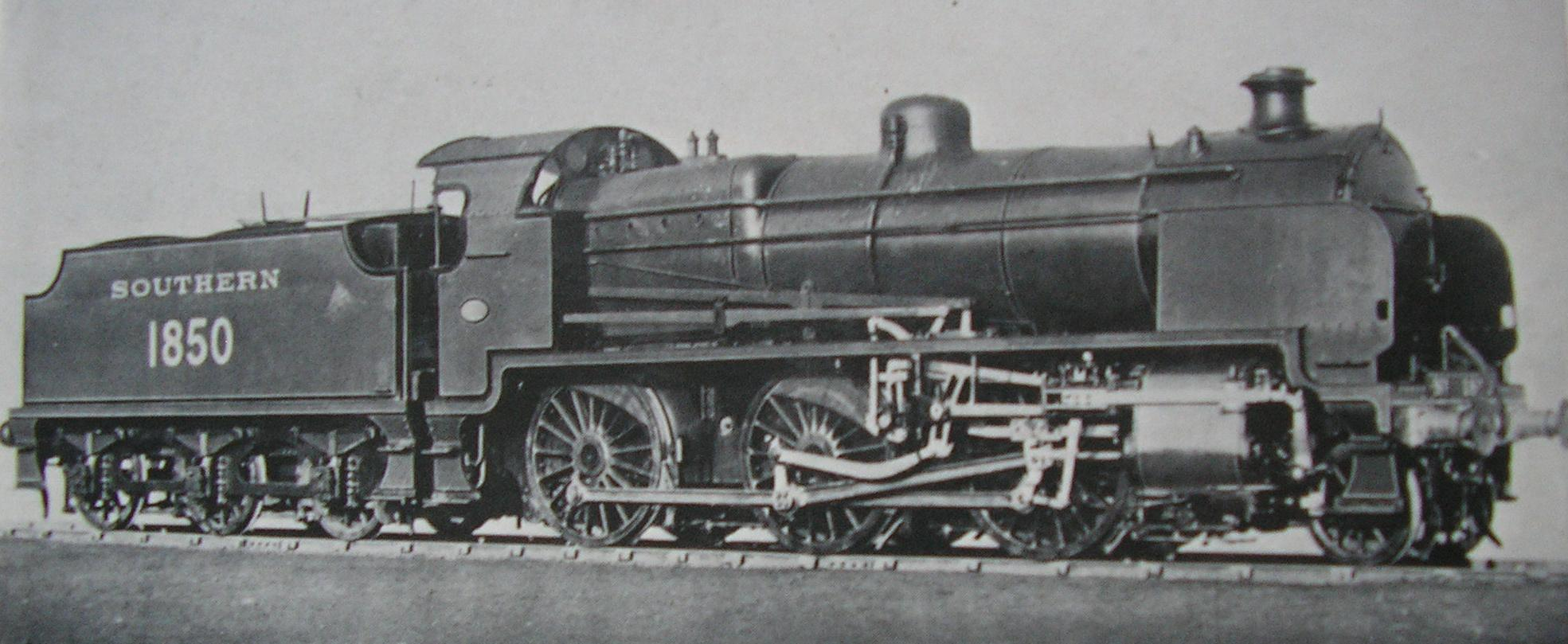
SECR N class No. 1850 with experimental J. T. Marshall valve gear

James Thompson Marshall (1854, Glanford Brigg, Lincolnshire - 1931, Knaresborough, Yorkshire) was an English railway and mechanical engineer known for inventing the 'Marshall valve gear' for steam locomotive use. James Marshall began his engineering career at the Leeds-based Steam Plough Company, and later moved to the city's Boyne Engine Works.

== Marshall valve gear ==
J. T. Marshall invented and patented several different valve gears but these should not be confused with the "Marshall valve gear" patented by Marshall, Sons & Co. in 1879. At least one of J. T. Marshall's valve gears was a rotary type and the only known application was to the Austrian BBÖ Class 114 locomotive.

The better-known J. T. Marshall gear was a modified Walschaerts valve gear which was first applied to a Great Northern Railway mineral locomotive, no. 743, in 1901 and received a glowing report. Next, it was tried on GNR Class C2 No. 1520 in March 1903. There was no external change visible on the locomotive as a result of this modification. When the valve gear was in use, the motion was derived from two eccentrics, one of which gave lap and lead movement by swinging the link backwards and forwards on its suspension bracket. The other eccentric was set at 90 degrees to the crank and rocked the link by means of a bell crank on the hanging link pin. The position of the radius rod die pin in the link determined the direction of movement and the cutoff. Showing little advantage over the normal Stephenson link valve gear, it was removed from the C2 'Atlantic' in April 1907 to ease maintenance.

A modified version of the gear (for outside drive) was tried on SECR N class no. 1850 in 1933-4 but, again, it was not a great success.

== Patents ==
- 14242/1894 Improvements in steam engine valves and gear for working them, with Reginald Wigram. Applied 24 July 1894, published 25 August 1894
- 05430/1897 Improvements in speed-regulating governors, specially suitable for electric-light and other high-speed engines. Applied 1 March 1897, published 1 August 1898
- 06013/1897 Improvements in metallic pistons and piston rings suitable for steam and other fluid pressure engines. Applied 6 March 1897, published 29 January 1898
- 07294/1898 Improvements in or relating to fluid-pressure engine valves and valve-gear. Applied 25 March 1898, Published 11 March 1899
- 13662/1900 Improvements in valve gears for steam engines, with Reginald Wigram. Applied 30 July 1900, published 11 May 1901
- 03761/1901 Improvements in valve gear for fluid pressure engines. Applied 21 February 1901, published 6 July 1901
- 03144/1906 Improvements in valve gear for fluid pressure engines. Applied 8 February 1906, published 7 February 1907
- 20911/1908 Improvements in slide and piston valves for fluid pressure, steam and other engines, with Enoch Richardson. Applied 3 October 1908, published 3 January 1910
- CA124691/1910 Slide valve for fluid pressure engines
- US962374/1910 Valve-gear for fluid-pressure engines
- GB256676/1926 Improvements in or relating to motive fluid engines
- CA272618/1927 Motive fluid engine

== Death ==
Marshall died in 1931.
