= BBÖ 114 =

Austrian steam locomotive

BBÖ 114 DRB 12.1 ÖBB 112
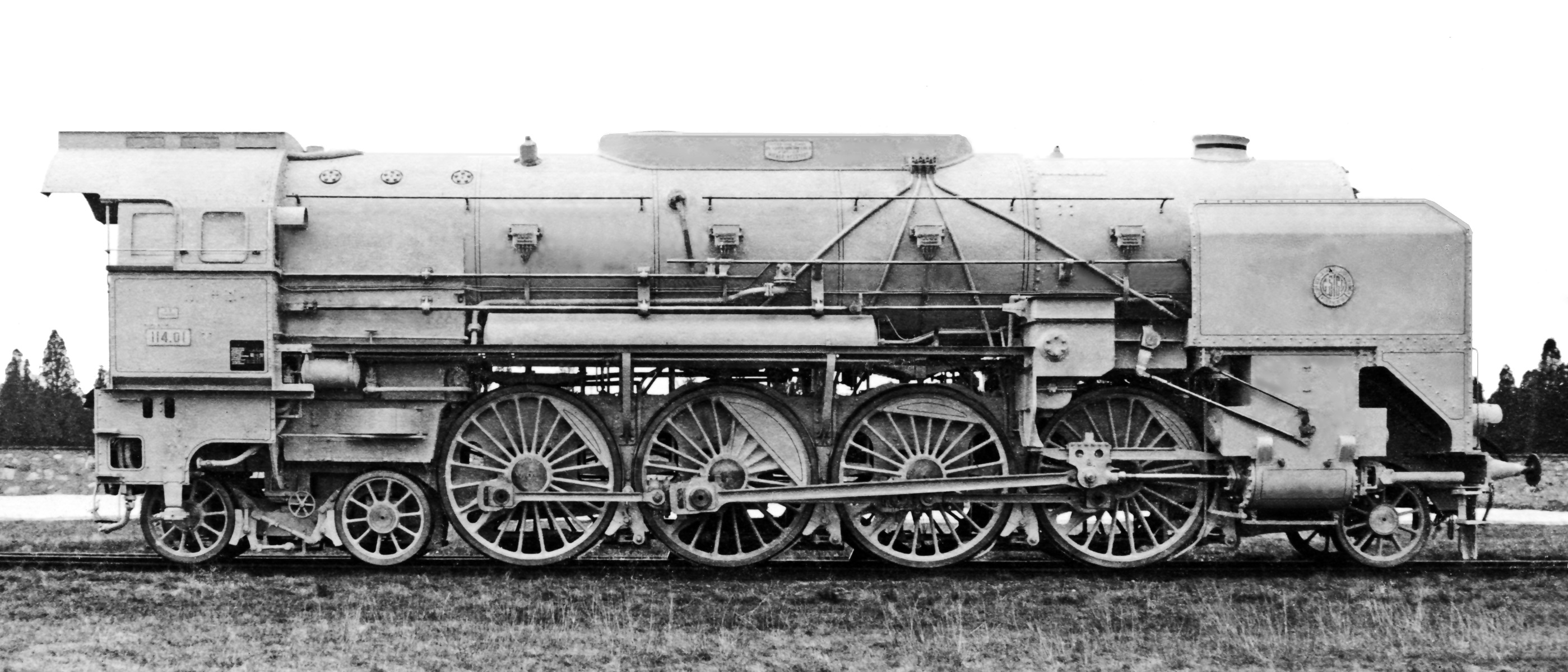
- Works' photograph of 114.01
Type and origin
- Builder: Wiener Neustädter Lokomotivfabrik
- Serial number: 5817
- Build date: 1929
- Total produced: 1
Specifications
- Configuration
  - Whyte: 2-8-4
- Gauge: 1,435 mm (4 ft 8 1/2 in)
- Leading dia.: 1,034 mm (3 ft 4 3/4 in)
- Driver dia.: 1,940 mm (6 ft 4 3/8 in)
- Trailing dia.: 1,034 mm (3 ft 4 3/4 in)
- Wheelbase
  - Overall: 12,635 mm (41 ft 5 1/2 in)
  - incl. tender: 19,403 mm (63 ft 8 in)
- Length
  - Over beams: 22,613 mm (74 ft 2 1/4 in)
- Height: 4,650 mm (15 ft 3 1/8 in)
- Adhesive weight: 70.2 t (69.1 long tons; 77.4 short tons)
- Service weight: 117.2 t (115.3 long tons; 129.2 short tons)
- Tender type: 84
- Fuel capacity: 8.0 t (17,600 lb) coal
- Water cap.: 29.50 m^{3} (6,490 imp gal; 7,790 US gal)
- Boiler
- No. of heating tubes: 151
- No. of smoke tubes: 38
- Boiler pressure: 15 kgf/cm^{2} (1.47 MPa; 213 lbf/in^{2})
- Heating surface
  - Firebox: 4.72 m^{2} (50.8 sq ft)
  - Radiative: 18.70 m^{2} (201.3 sq ft)
  - Evaporative: 262.00 m^{2} (2,820.1 sq ft)
- Superheater
  - Heating area: 91.00 m^{2} (979.5 sq ft)
- Cylinders: 3
- Cylinder size: 530 mm (20 7/8 in)
- Piston stroke: 720 mm (28 3/8 in)
Performance figures
- Maximum speed: 100 km/h (62 mph)
Career
- Numbers: BBÖ 114.01; DRB 12 101; ÖBB 112.01
- Retired: 1953

The BBÖ 114 was a class of one Austrian three-cylinder 2-8-4 express train steam locomotive.

At the same time as plans were developed for the two-cylinder 214 series, design emerged in the Wiener Neustädter Lokomotivfabrik for a three-cylinder engine. In order to be able to compare the two designs it was decided to build a prototype of each one. Number 114.01 was built in the Wiener Neustädter Lokomotivfabrik and delivered in 1929.

In general the advantage of three-cylinder locomotives lies in their more powerful torque and a better balance of the rotating masses, which leads to lower wear and tear. The disadvantage is a higher fuel consumption due to the three steam engines. This was true in the case of 114.01 which in comparison with locomotive 214.01 had a 9% higher consumption of coal. Difficult access to the inside gear and the associated poor maintainability of locomotive 114.01, combined with the fact that 214.01 did better in the trial runs, led to the 214s going into series production. Number 114.01 remained in service with the BBÖ as a one-off. A visible difference from the 214s is the visible parts of the unusual Marshall valve gear with its rotating camshaft.

In 1938 the Deutsche Reichsbahn redesignated this locomotive as number 12 101.

Number 114.01 was employed on the locomotive schedules (Umlaufplan) of the 214s and, amongst other things, was allowed to head the first Arlberg Orient Express after the Second World War. In 1948 it was converted to oil-firing due to the shortage of coal. On 6 August 1949 the middle cylinder broke. Due to the irreparable damage the locomotive was sidelined and dismantled in 1953.

== See also ==
- Deutsche Reichsbahn
- List of DRG locomotives and railbuses
