= BBÖ 214 =

BBÖ 214 CFR 142 DRB 12.0 ÖBB 12
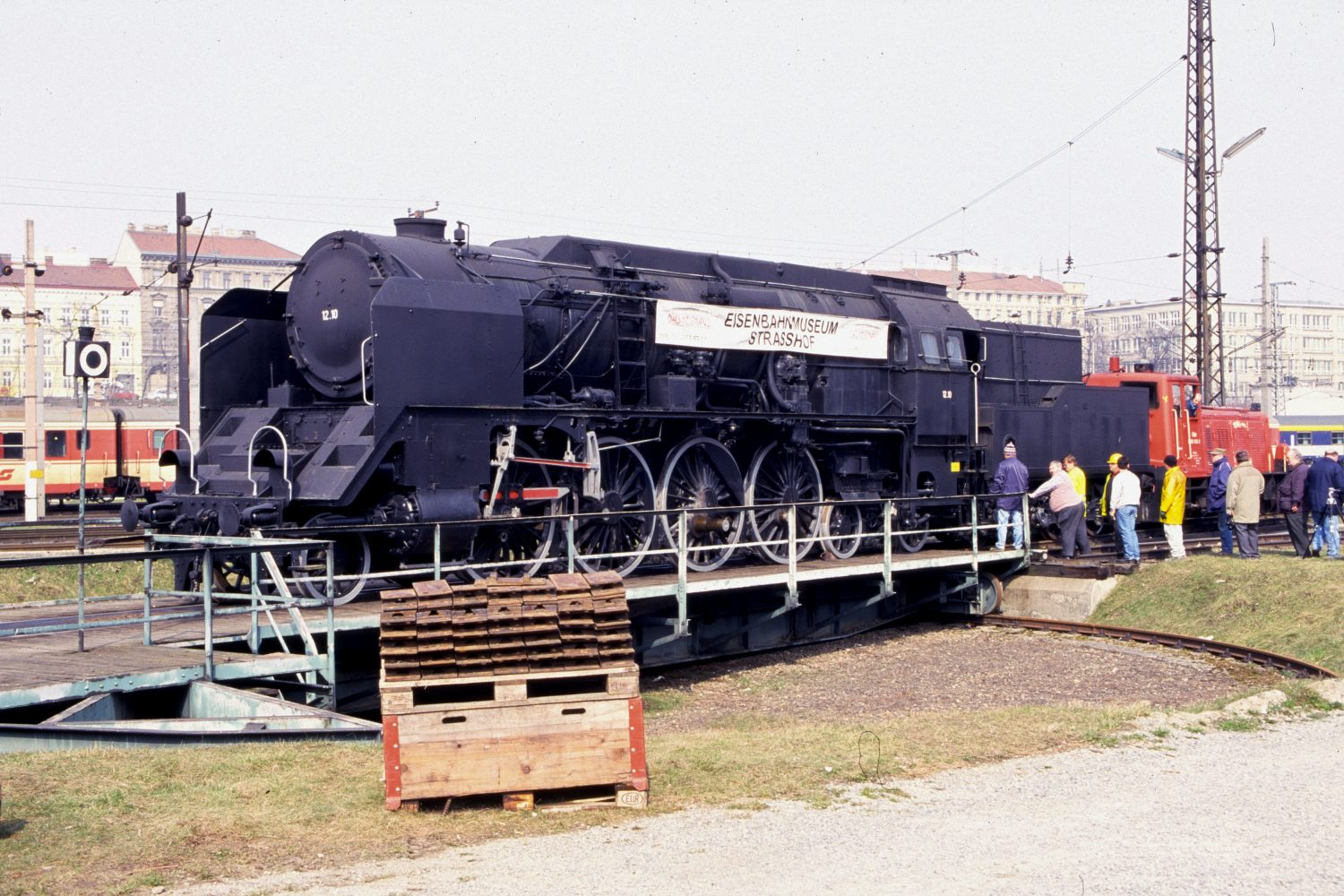
- BBÖ 214-ÖBB 12
Type and origin
- Builder: Lokomotivfabrik Floridsdorf
- Build date: 1928–1936
- Total produced: 13
Specifications
- Configuration
  - Whyte: 2-8-4
- Gauge: 1,435 mm (4 ft 8 1/2 in)
- Driver dia.: 1,940 mm (6 ft 4 3/8 in)
- Carrying wheel diameter: 1,034 mm (3 ft 4 3/4 in)
- Length
  - Over beams: 22,580 mm (74 ft 1 in)
- Width: 3,150 mm (10 ft 4 in)
- Height: 4,650 mm (15 ft 3 1/8 in)
- Axle load: 18.0 t (17.7 long tons; 19.8 short tons)
- Adhesive weight: 72 t (71 long tons; 79 short tons)
- Empty weight: 107 or 114 t (105 or 112 long tons; 118 or 126 short tons)
- Service weight: 118 or 123.5 t (116.1 or 121.5 long tons; 130.1 or 136.1 short tons)
- Tender weight: 60 t (59 long tons; 66 short tons)
- Total weight: 178 or 183.5 t (175.2 or 180.6 long tons; 196.2 or 202.3 short tons)
- Fuel capacity: 8.0 t (7.9 long tons; 8.8 short tons) of coal
- Water cap.: 29.5 m^{3} (6,500 imp gal; 7,800 US gal)
- Boiler pressure: 15 kgf/cm^{2} (1.47 MPa; 213 lbf/in^{2})
- Heating surface
  - Firebox: 4.72 m^{2} (50.8 sq ft)
  - Evaporative: 258 m^{2} (2,780 sq ft)
- Superheater
  - Heating area: 91.00 m^{2} (979.5 sq ft)
- Cylinders: 2
- Cylinder size: 650 mm (25 9/16 in)
- Piston stroke: 720 mm (28 3/8 in)
- Transmission: 2-cylinder simple superheated
- Train control: Heusinger (Walschaerts with Lentz valves
- Train brakes: Air brake
- Couplers: Buffers and chain coupling
Performance figures
- Maximum speed: 110 or 120 km/h (68 or 75 mph)
- Indicated power: 2,940 PS (2,160 kW; 2,900 hp)
- Tractive effort
  - Starting: 200 kN (45,000 lbf)
Career
- Numbers: BBÖ: 214.01 – 214.13; DRB: 12 001 – 12 013; ÖBB: 12.01 – 12.13
- Retired: 1961–1962

The BBÖ 214 were a class of 13 Austrian 2-8-4 express train steam locomotives of the Federal Railways of Austria (Bundesbahnen Österreich, BBÖ). They were the largest steam locomotives ever built in Austria and the most powerful express locomotives with the longest connecting rods that existed in Europe at that time. To date, the 214 has the longest connecting rods in the world. During test runs, a locomotive reached a speed of 155 km/h.

== History ==
In 1927, the board of the BBÖ decided to temporarily stop electrification. In the course of this very controversial decision, it was also decided to purchase new steam locomotives for the Westbahn, which should be so powerful that they could achieve the same travel times with heavy express trains between Vienna and Salzburg as would have been possible with electric operation. Of the two prototypes, 114.01 (three-cylinder engine, delivered in 1929) and 214.01 (two-cylinder engine, delivered in 1928), the 214 series was finally selected for further construction. In 1931, Lokomotivfabrik Floridsdorf built six locomotives, and in 1936 built another six with technical modifications. The Romanian State Railways (Căile Ferate Române, CFR), or more precisely Reșița Works or Nicolae Malaxa in Romania, acquired a license from Floridsdorf and built 79 units with minor changes, which were given the series designation 142 by the CFR.

The new locomotives were used in the express train service between Vienna and Salzburg or Passau. After being taken over by the Deutsche Reichsbahn in the wake of the annexation of Austria to the German Reich, they were referred to as the class 12 and now used as far as Regensburg. After 1945, the ÖBB kept the series 12 designation for the locomotives.

After the electrification of the Westbahn, this powerful type was no longer suitable for use. Some machines were transferred to the Südbahn in 1953 and used between Vienna and Villach. The different conditions, in particular the tight curve radii and steeper gradients on the Semmering, quickly became noticeable in heavy wear, so that the last journey at the head of an express train took place as early as 1956. In the expectation of finding a buyer for these locomotives, some of which were only 20 years old, they were initially stored in warm storage in the Vienna area. The progressive electrification of the main lines in neighboring countries made the purchase of steam express locomotives unnecessary and so the locomotives were scrapped in 1961 and 1962.

== Preserved locomotives ==
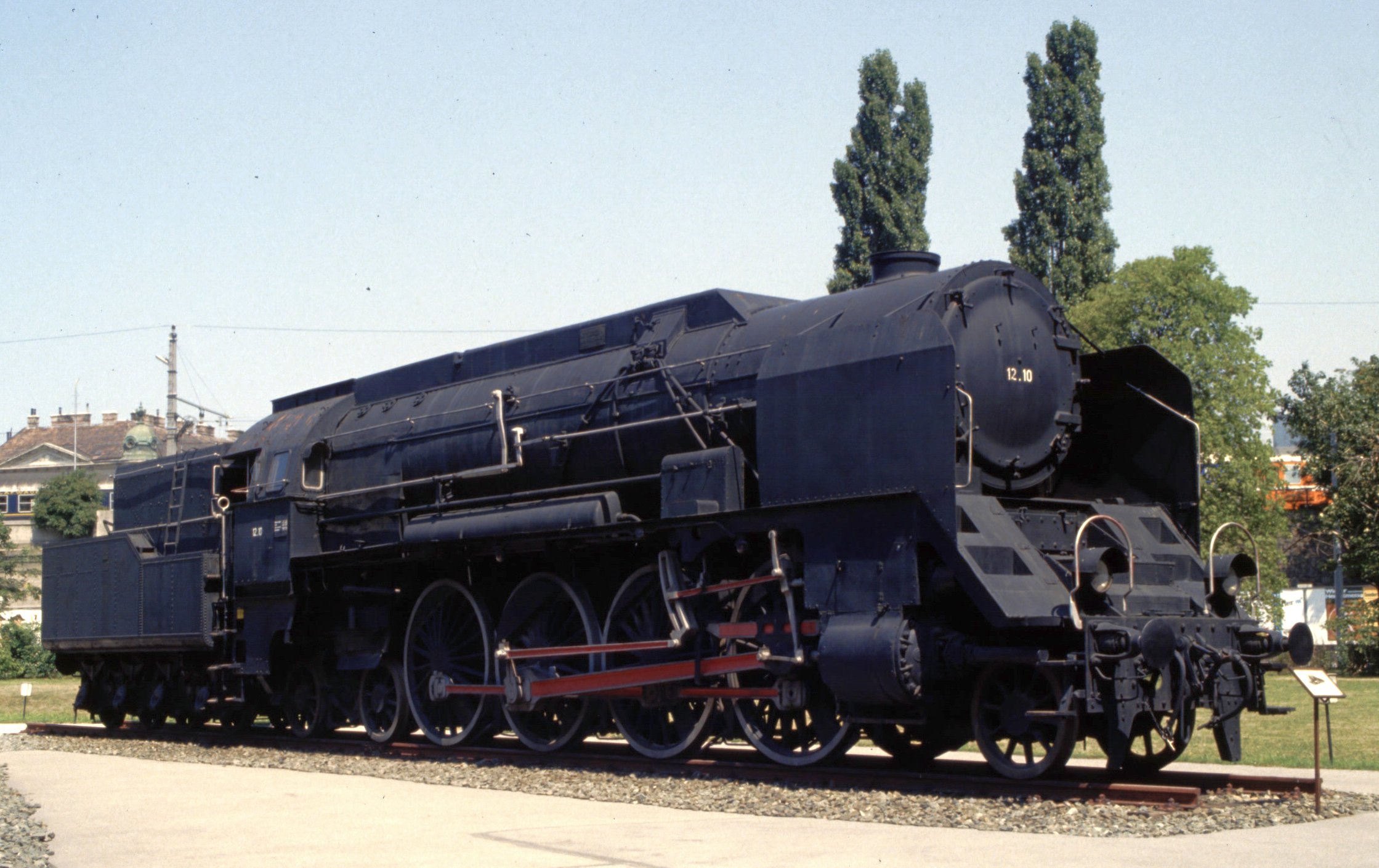
12.10 in the Technical Museum, Vienna in 1980

The 12.10 was the only one that remained for posterity. It was left to the Austrian Railway Museum and initially stored in a sheltered boiler house. In the 1970s it was erected as a memorial together with other historically significant steam locomotives (including the 310.23) in a locomotive park at the Vienna Technical Museum. After the locomotive park was closed as part of a restructuring of the Technical Museum, it was transferred to the Strasshof Railway Museum in Lower Austria in 1999, where it was exhibited as a non-operational exhibit. On October 19, 2018, the locomotive was moved by heavy transporter to Korneuburg. The external restoration began there, and in 2019 it was originally supposed to be exhibited in Wiener Neustadt as part of the state exhibition. However, since the 12.10 is not a Wiener Neustädter Lokomotivfabrik locomotive, it was ultimately dispensed with. It was transferred to the Technical Museum in Vienna in October 2019 and has been open to the public again in the West Hall since September 2020.

In 1985 the Austrian Society for Railway History (Österreichischen Gesellschaft für Eisenbahngeschichte, ÖGEG) succeeded in acquiring the locomotive 142.063 from the CFR, which was a license replica of the 214 series machines from 1939. It was adapted to the Austrian equipment and after restoration and general inspection in 1993 it was put back into operation with the (fictitious) number 12.14. It is now based in Ampflwang, but has not yet been returned to service after the boiler ticket expired and can currently be viewed partially dismantled (as of 2019).

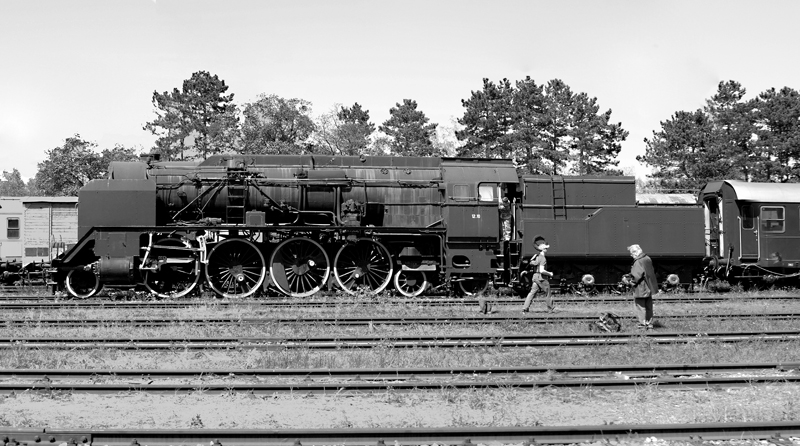
2.10 in the Strasshof Railway Museum

Number	Build year	Status	Owner / location	Notes
ÖBB 12.10	1936	non-operational	Vienna Technical Museum	
CFR 142.063	1939	non-operational	ÖGEG / Ampflwang	Displayed as "12.14"

At least three other copies of the Romanian 142 series have been preserved in Romania.
