= Porsche Type 12 =

- Porsche Type 12 replica on static display at Museum Industriekultur Nürnberg

Overview
- Manufacturer: Ferdinand Porsche
- Production: 1931–1932
- Assembly: Stuttgart
- Designer: Ferdinand Porsche

Body and chassis
- Class: compact car
- Body style: saloon; drophead coupé
- Layout: rear-engine, rear-wheel drive
- Platform: Porsche Type 12
- Related: VW Beetle

Powertrain
- Engine: Zündapp five-cylinder radial
- Transmission: three-speed manual
- Propulsion: tyres

Dimensions
- Wheelbase: 2,500 mm (98.4 in)
- Length: 3,330 mm (131.1 in)
- Width: 1,420 mm (55.9 in)
- Height: 1,500 mm (59.1 in)
- Kerb weight: 900 kg (1,984 lb)

Chronology
- Successor: Porsche Type 32

The Porsche Type 12 was a German project to develop an "Everyman's automobile" (Auto für Jedermann) for Zündapp. Fritz Neumeyer, then owner of Zündapp, ordered Ferdinand Porsche to design and build the prototype in 1931. Eventually, two saloons, and one drophead coupé were built. All of those cars were lost during World War II, the last one in a bombing raid in Stuttgart in 1945. The Type 12 is considered an important early step in the development of the original Volkswagen. A replica of the Type 12 is on static display at the Museum Industriekultur in Nürnberg.

== Comparison with contemporary concepts ==
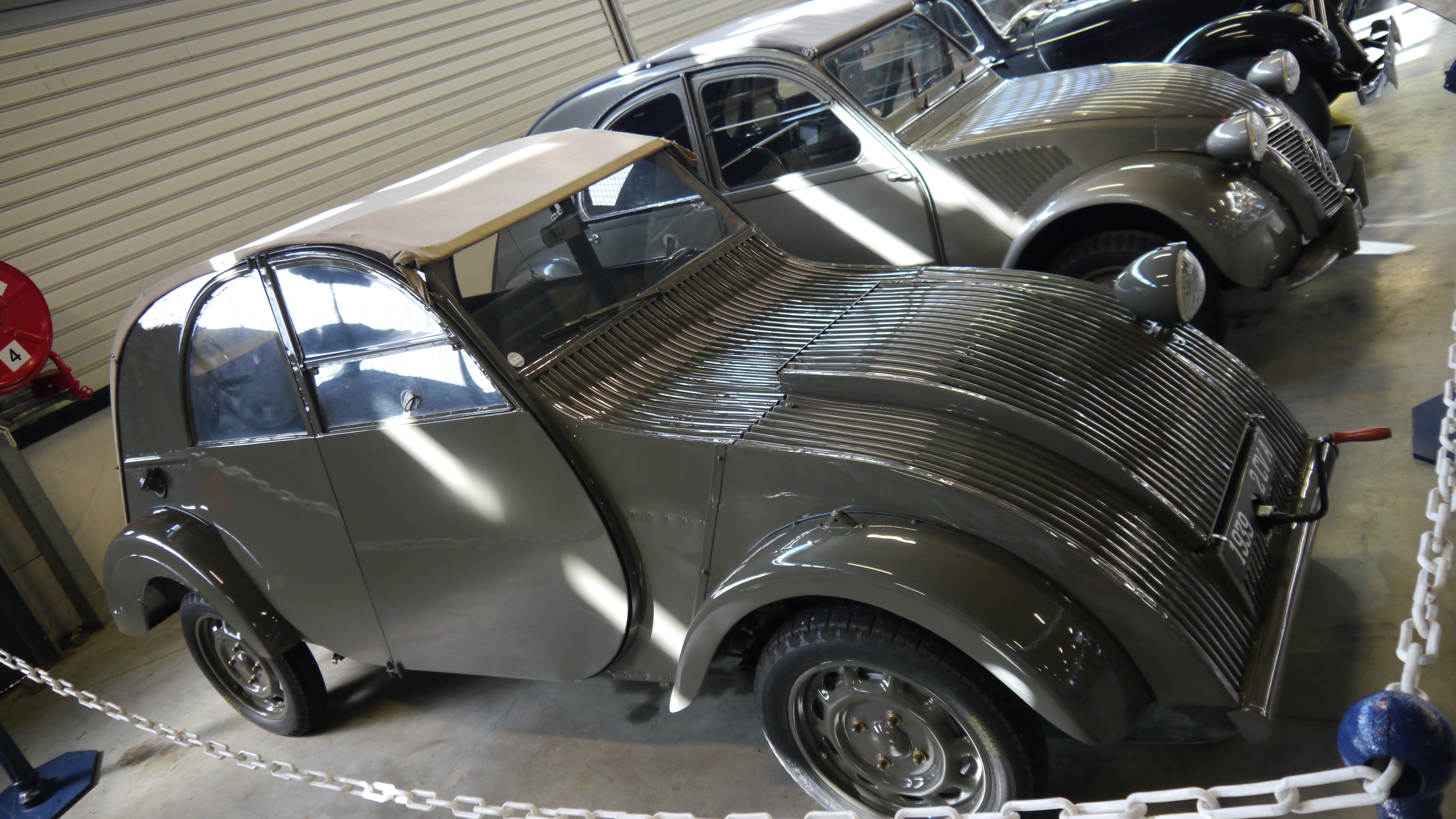
In 1936 Citroen also started work on a cheap, streamlined car with all independent suspension, a platform chassis and no prop-shaft – the 2CV.

The Type 12 was an early example of the aerodynamic and rounded designs that came somewhat in vogue in the 1930s, developed concurrently with Mercedes-Benz's 120H, and ahead of Tatra's second V570 prototype, and DKW's F2-based, one-off rear-engined streamline prototype — both in 1933. In production cars, the style was typified by the 1934 Chrysler and DeSoto Airflow, Toyota's AA copy of these (1936), and the eventual "People's car", the 1938 KdF-Wagen aka the Volkswagen Type 1 or Beetle.
Contemporaneous prototypes with a more extreme focus on aerodynamics were the 1933 Dymaxion car and Karl Schlör's Schlörwagen, developed from 1936 to 1939.

== Description ==
The vehicle has a single, U-profile, central beam frame as opposed to the VW Beetle's central tube platform chassis. The car's body (made by Reutter) has – for its time period – a reasonably aerodynamic shape with covered rear wheel arches. Both the front and the rear axles are leaf sprung and feature a single, transverse leaf spring each. Porsche used a worm-gear steering box and four hydraulic drum brakes on the Type 12. The car already has the VW Beetle-typical drivetrain design with a combined rear gearbox differential unit with the engine directly flanged to its rear end, which means that, the rear axle is a swing axle, located in between the gearbox, and the engine. This was technically feasible because the engine was rather short in length. Unlike the VW Beetle, the Porsche Type 12 has a wet single disc clutch.

The engine is a five-cylinder radial Zündapp-made Otto (spark ignition) engine, rather than the flat four Porsche preferred. The five-cylinder Zündapp engine is water-cooled, and has a regular water pump. The camshaft is of the cam drum variety (i. e. a very short camshaft) and actuates two overhead valves per cylinder. With its 70 by 62 mm bore and stroke, the engine displaces 1,193 cm^{3} (72.8 in^{3}). It has a compression of ε=5.3, a single Zenith 26 mm carburettor, and produces 26 PS (19 kW) at 3200/min. The car's top speed is 80 km/h (50 mph).

== Gallery ==
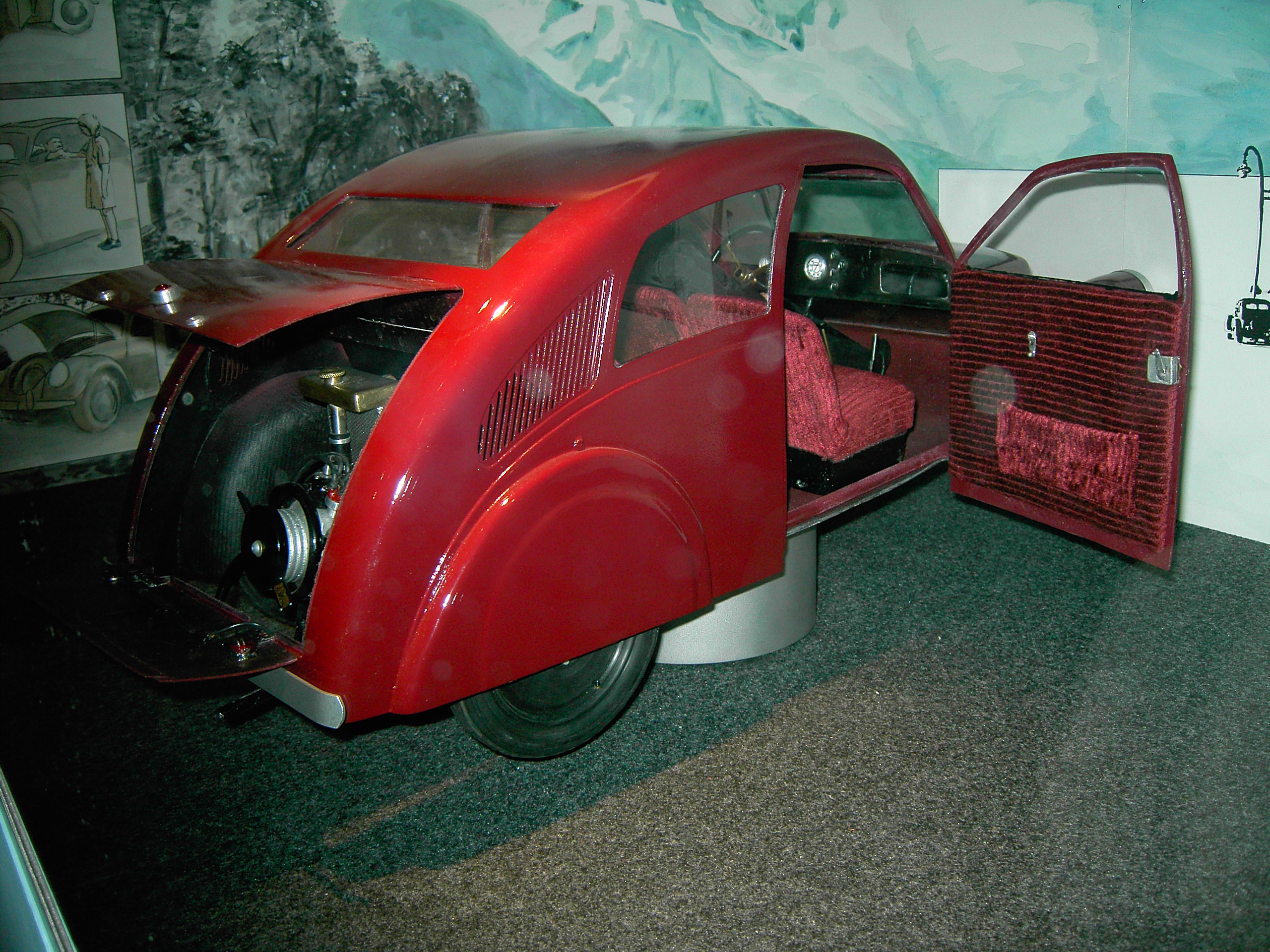
Right side of the Type 12 Replica

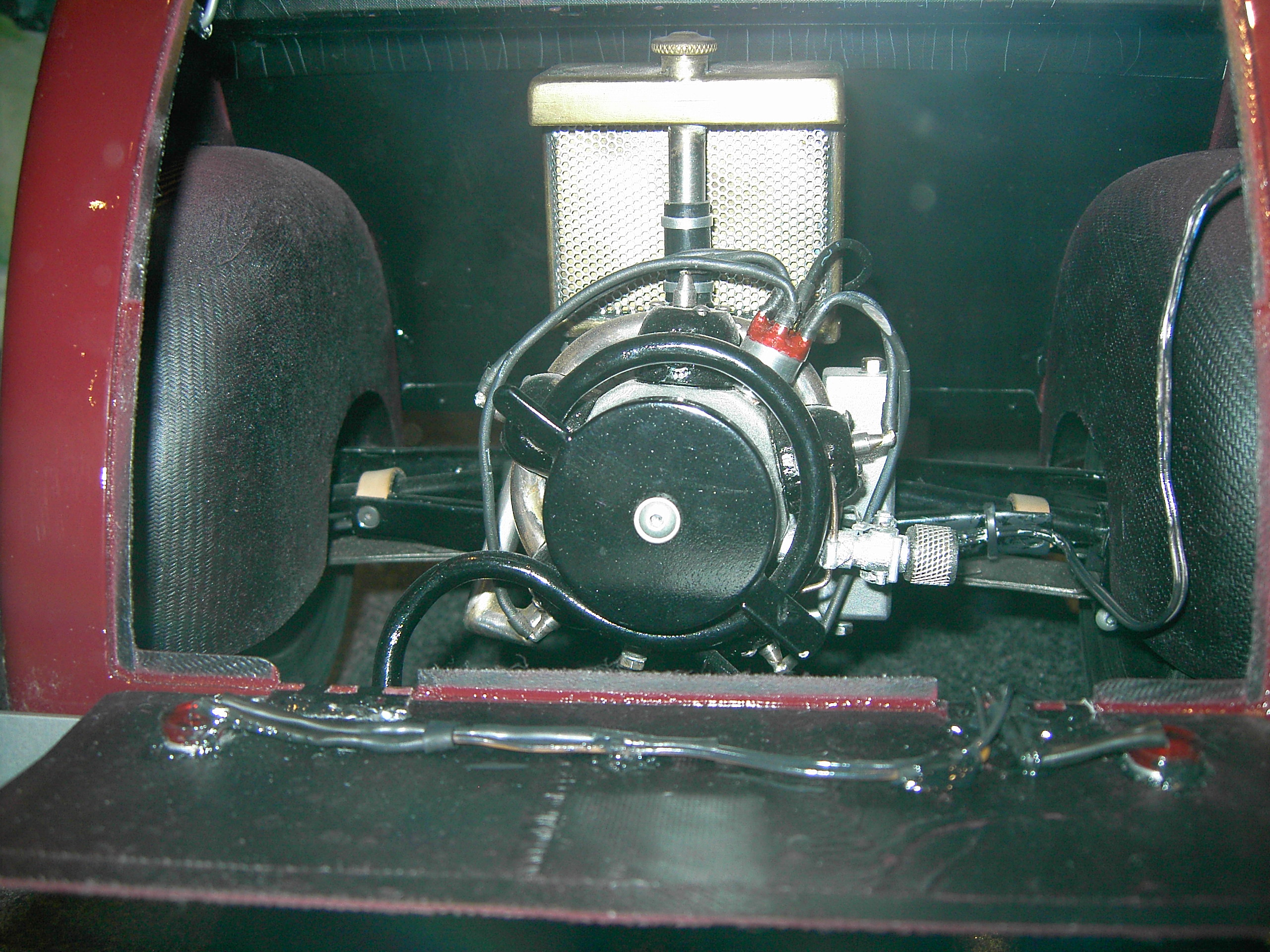
Five cylinder radial engine in the Type 12 replica

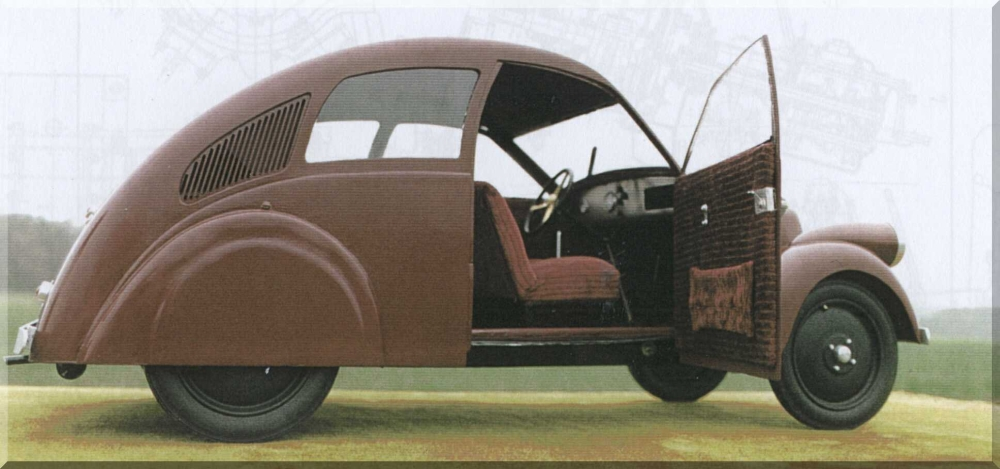
Scale model of the Porsche Type 12
