= EAR 12 class =

East African Railways 12 class
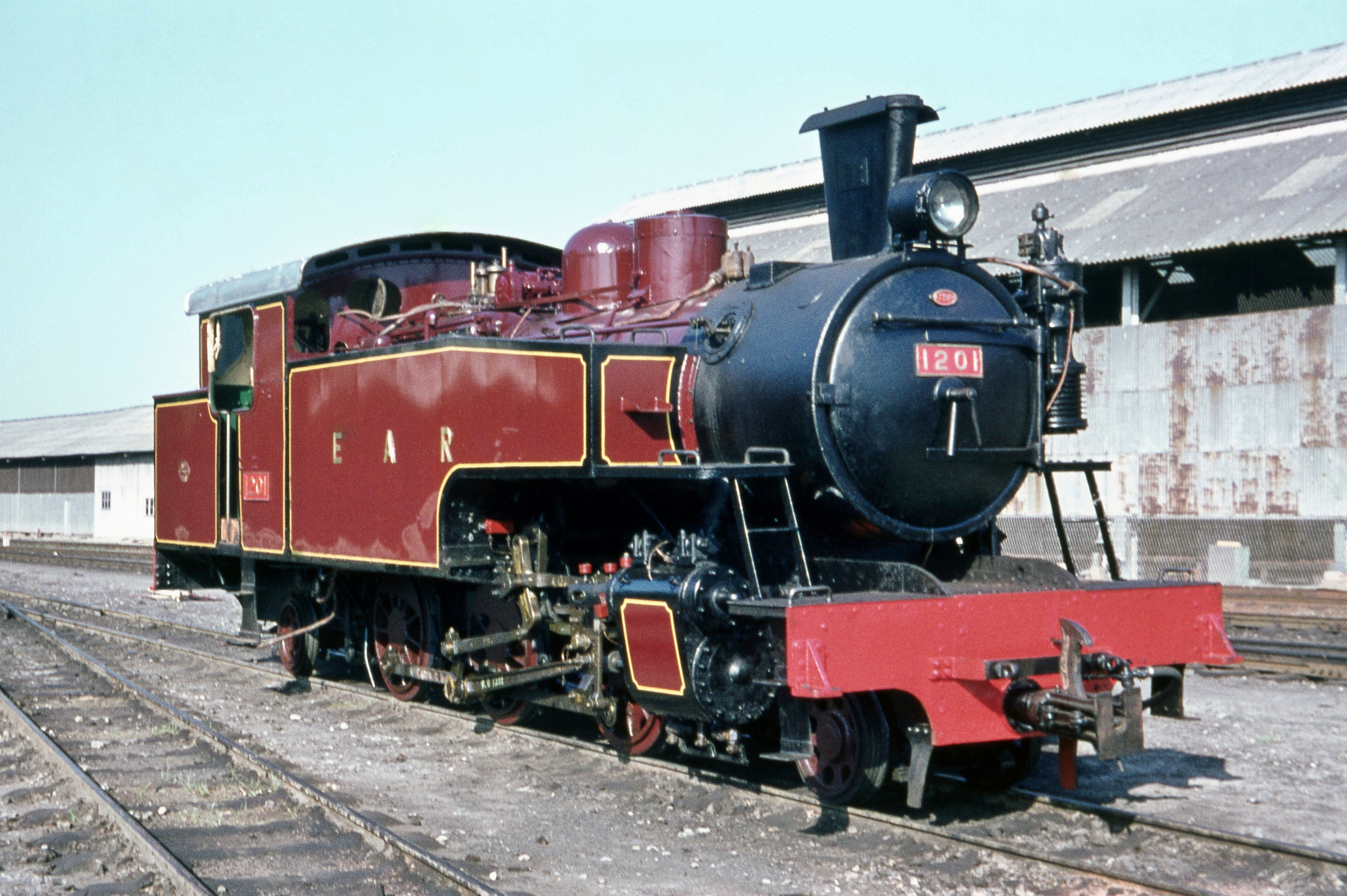
- No. 1201 at Dar es Salaam railway station in 1968
Type and origin
- Power type: Steam
- Builder: W. G. Bagnall
- Serial number: 2901–2902
- Build date: 1950
- Total produced: 2
Specifications
- Configuration
  - Whyte: 2-6-2T
- Gauge: 1,000 mm (3 ft 3 3/8 in)

The EAR 12 class was a class of 1,000 mm (3 ft 3 3/8 in) gauge 2-6-2T steam locomotives built by W. G. Bagnall in Stafford, England, in 1950. The class had been ordered by the Tanganyika Railway (TR) as its SS class, and was a modified and updated version of the TR's existing ST class.

By the time the two members of the class were built and entered service, the TR had been succeeded by the East African Railways (EAR), which designated them as its 12 class, and put them to work in the Tanganyika Territory (now part of Tanzania).

== See also ==
- History of rail transport in Tanzania
