= MGWR Class 12 =

Class of 6 Irish 0-4-2 locomotives

MGWR Classes 12, 14, 15, 16, 19
Type and origin
- Power type: Steam
- Builder: Fairbairn; Neilson; Dübs
- Build date: 1860-1872
Specifications
- Configuration
  - Whyte: 0-4-2
- Gauge: 5 ft 3 in (1,600 mm)
Career
- Operators: Midland Great Western Railway (MGWR)
- Locale: Ireland

Midland Great Western Railway (MGWR) Classes 12, 14, 15, 16 and 19 were 36 0-4-2 locomotives acquired in 5 batches over the period 1861-1872. The first 0-4-2s were introduced by the Locomotive Superintendent Joseph Cabry, and his successor Robert Ramage in 1863 also seemed to favour the type. After Martin Atock succeeded in 1872 there were no more orders of the type due to generally poor timekeeping.

== MGWR Class 12 ==
The MGWR Class 12 were a batch of 6 locomotives supplied by Fairbairn in 1860, the final locomotives from Fairbairn to the MGWR. They lasted just under 20 years, but by their last days were removed from goods to pilot and permanent way duties. Initially numbered 43-48 they were later renumbered 49-54.

MGWR No.	Name	Introduced	Withdrawn
43	Regent	1860	1879
44	Duke	1860	1879
45	Marquis	1860	1879
46	Baron	1860	1879
47	Viscount	1860	1879
48	Earl	1860	1879

== MGWR Class 14 ==
For MGWR Class 14 the MGWR used a fresh supplier Neilsons of Glasgow. The class was introduced in 1863 and all were withdrawn by 1885.

MGWR No.	Name	Introduced	Withdrawn
55	Inny	1863	1885
56	Liffy	1863	1885
57	Lough Corrib	1863	1885
58	Lough Gill	1863	1885
59	Shannon	1863	1885
60	Lough Owel	1863	1885

== MGWR Class 15 ==
Neilsons supplied a further 6 0-4-2 locomotives in 1864 forming MGWR Class 15.

MGWR No.	Name	Introduced	Withdrawn
61	Lynx	1864	1887
62	Tiger	1864	1888
63	Lion	1864	1888
64	Leopard	1864	1888
65	Wolf	1864	1888
66	Elephant	1864	1889

== MGWR Class 16 ==
For a batch of six 0-4-2 locomotives for 1867, the MGWR switched to Dübs and Company, also based in Glasgow. These became MGWR Class 16.

MGWR No.	Name	Introduced	Withdrawn
67	Dublin	1867	1888
68	Mullingar	1867	1887
69	Athlone	1867	1889
70	Ballinasloe	1867	1888
71	Galway	1867	1887
72	Sligo	1867	1888

== MGWR Class 19 ==
For the final batch of new build locomotives, the MGWR switched supplier back to Neilsons. Following design changes instigated by Martin Atock, most of this batch had a four-ring boiler 3.5 inches (8.9 cm) longer with modified frames. With their withdrawal in 1892, the use of 0-4-2 by the MGWR came to an end.

MGWR No.	Name	Introduced	Withdrawn
73	Comet	1871	1892
74	Luna	1871	1892
75	Hector	1871	1892
76	Lightning	1871	1892
77	Star	1871	1891
78	Planet	1871	1891
79	Mayo	1872	1892
80	Dunsandle	1872	1891
81	Clancarty	1872	1892
82	Clonbrock	1872	1892
83	Lucan	1872	1891
84	Dunkellan	1872	1891
