= List of Taiwanese Pacific locomotives =

The first 4-6-2 Pacific type locomotives appeared in Taiwan in 1912 when ALCo-Rogers delivered three simple expansion superheated 470 x 610 1600 62.2 tons Pacific type locomotives derived from Japanese Government Railways saturated type 8900 delivered earlier by ALCo-Brooks to Japan to suit the Taiwanese conditions. They received numbers 200 - 202. One more locomotive number 203 was delivered in 1913. These locomotives started the Pacific era, which lasted more than sixty years in Taiwan. Later the ALCo Pacifics became class E 200. These American-built Pacifics remained the only ones in the island up to 1935. They hauled the most important passenger express pair of trains between Taihoku and Takao.

In 1935 five more Pacific type locomotives, this time standard Japanese Government Railways class 55 Pacifics, were added to the locomotive stock numbered 551 - 555. In 1938 four more were delivered numbered 556 - 559. When the Pacific War started on December 7, 1941, there were only 13 Pacific type locomotives working in Taiwan. The increasing wartime traffic demanded more passenger type locomotives in Taiwan. Two new Pacifics, this time Japanese Government Railways class 57, arrived in 1942 and four more in 1943. In addition, during the war the Japanese could only deliver to Taiwan some of their C11 type 1C1t-h2 tank locomotives and their general purpose class D51 1D1-h2 Mikado type locomotives.

All Pacifics survived the war. Hitachi delivered eight more class 57s (presumably as war reparations) to Taiwan Railway Administration. These were the last Pacific type locomotives to arrive in Taiwan or, then called, National China under the Chiang Kai-shek administration. All of them were of 2C1-h2 wheel arrangement and built to 1,067 mm (3 ft 6 in) gauge.

class	number	builder	serial number	build date	notes (preservation status as of November 2006)
E	200	ALCo-Rogers	51494	1912	in service to 1950s
E	201	ALCo-Rogers	51495	1912	in service to 1950s
E	202	ALCo-Rogers	51496	1912	in service to 1950s
E	203	ALCo-Rogers	53977	1912	in service to 1950s
CT	251	Mitsubishi	169	1935	1972 in service Taipei; preserved at Tainan City Sports Park
CT	252	Mitsubishi	170	1935	
CT	253	Mitsubishi	171	1935	1972 in service Taipei
CT	254	Mitsubishi	172	1935	
CT	255	Kawasaki	1575	1935	1972 in service Taipei
CT	256	Mitsubishi	215	1938	1972 in service Taipei
CT	257	Mitsubishi	216	1938	
CT	258	Mitsubishi	219	1938	1972 in service Taipei
CT	259	Mitsubishi	220	1938	1972 in service Taipei; preserved at Takao Railway Museum
CT	271	Hitachi	1512	1942	1972 in service Chia Yi; preserved at Shyh-jia
CT	272	Hitachi	1513	1942	
CT	273	Kawasaki	2862	1943	1972 in service Chia Yi; preserved at Changhua Roundhouse
CT	274	Kawasaki	2863	1943	1972 in service Chia Yi
CT	275	Kawasaki	2864	1943	
CT	276	Kawasaki	2865	1943	1972 in service Chia Yi
CT	277	Hitachi	2102	1953	1972 in service Chia Yi
CT	278	Hitachi	2103	1953	Preserved at Ershui
CT	279	Hitachi	2104	1953	
CT	280	Hitachi	2105	1953	
CT	281	Hitachi	2106	1953	
CT	282	Hitachi	2107	1953	
CT	283	Hitachi	2108	1953	1972 in service Chia Yi
CT	284	Hitachi	2109	1953	1972 in service Chia Yi; preserved at Yilan sports park

Class E was reclassified to ET, and class C to CT under Taiwan Railway Administration.
