= JGR Class 1070 =

Class of Japanese 4-4-2T locomotives

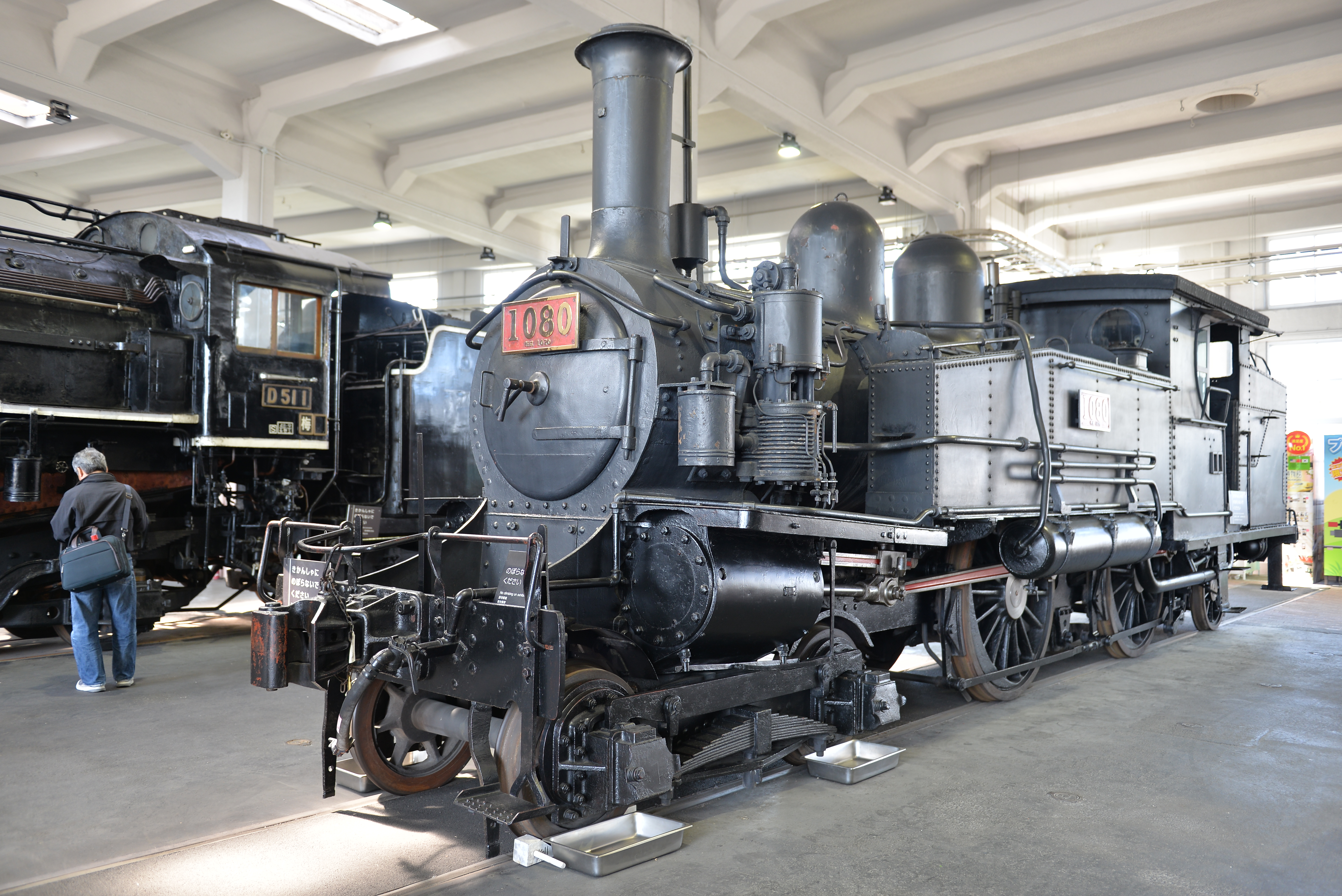
- Locomotive 1080, preserved at the Kyoto Railway Museum
Type and origin
- Power type: Steam
- Builder: Original manufacturers: Dübs and Company; Neilson & Company
- Build date: 1900–1904, 1909
- Rebuilder: Japanese Ministry of Railways
- Rebuild date: 1925-1928
- Number rebuilt: 49
Specifications
- Configuration
  - Whyte: 4-4-2T
- Gauge: 1,067 mm (3 ft 6 in)
- Cylinders: Two, outside
Career
- Disposition: One preserved, remainder scrapped

The JGR Class 1070 were a type of Japanese steam locomotives, rebuilt from the earlier Class 6200 and Class 6270 locomotives, first imported from the United Kingdom between 1900 and 1904 and in 1909. Rebuilt during the 1920s, the Class 1070s were used for urban and rural train service and later in industrial service, running from the 1920s into the 1970s.

== History ==
Japan had a long history of using imported locomotives, dating back to the 19th Century. Large American and European manufacturers delivered many types of locomotives to the country.

The Class 6200 and 6270 were tender locomotives, built by Dübs and Company and Neilson & Company in the United Kingdom; both firms had previously delivered similar types to Japan earlier in the 19th century. Class 6200 and 6270 locomotives were rebuilt into the Class 1070 tank engines by the Japanese Ministry of Railways (JMR) starting in 1925. The newly rebuilt tank engines were used for urban or local train service and could sometimes be used as yard shunters. They were later transferred for use on local private or industrial railways, pulling freight or again as shunters. The 6200s in particular were first used for passenger service on the Tokaido trunk line.

Starting in 1925, the rebuilding process for the Class 1070 4-4-2 tank engines was undertaken at the Hamamatsu, Omiya and Takatori JMR locomotive works. To convert the locomotives, the tender was uncoupled, both sides of the locomotive's main frame were elongated and a new radial trailing wheel was added. A coal bunker was installed behind the locomotive's cab, and new water tanks were fixed to both sides of the boiler. Many important parts from the original locomotive were reused, including the boilers, cylinders, valve gears and driving wheels. The wheel base of the two driving wheels was not altered.

== Preservation: Locomotive 1080 ==
As a typical example of the 1070s, locomotive number 1080 was selected for preservation in September 2009 and was restored by technicians at the Umekoji Works in Kyoto. The locomotive was selected for preservation by JR West, being of historical and technological significance, a potential candidate for designation as a Mechanical Engineering Heritage of the JSME.

=== History ===
Number 1080 was built by Dübs and Company in 1901 and was rebuilt by the Hamamatsu Works in 1926. It worked local lines (assigned to the Mino-ohta locomotive depot in 1933), until the railway line was shuttered in 1939. 1080 was then used on the Akatani mine railway of the Nittetsu Mining Co. in Niigata Prefecture, starting in 1940 until the mine closed the railway in 1957, where it hauled ore trains and was used to ferry mine workers to and from the site. When the mine railway closed, the locomotive then moved (in 1957) to the Hanezuru mine (also owned by Nittetsu Mining) in Tochigi Prefecture, where it ran until 1979 (the mine itself closed in 1991). It was used as the primary reserve locomotive for the Hanezuru mine's diesel locomotives, hauling mostly limestone trains, until the mine railway closed in 1979. When it arrived at the Museum in 2009, it was mostly complete, still having all valves, gauges and the number plate. A fence was erected around the locomotive for painting and restoration work. It received a coat of rust-resistant paint on the trucks, boiler and safety valve. A new coating was applied to the boiler and preservation work was done in the cabin. Some new gauges were installed, while others simply needed polishing.

Locomotive 1080 is one of the oldest in the collection of the Umekoji Steam Locomotive Museum (Kyoto Railway Museum). It is historically significant as an example of the standard tender locomotive in the Meiji era and as the origin of domestically designed standard tender locomotives in the Taisho era.
