= JNR Class C55 =

Class of 62 Japanese 4-6-2 steam locomotives

JNR Class C55 Taiwan Railways Class CT250
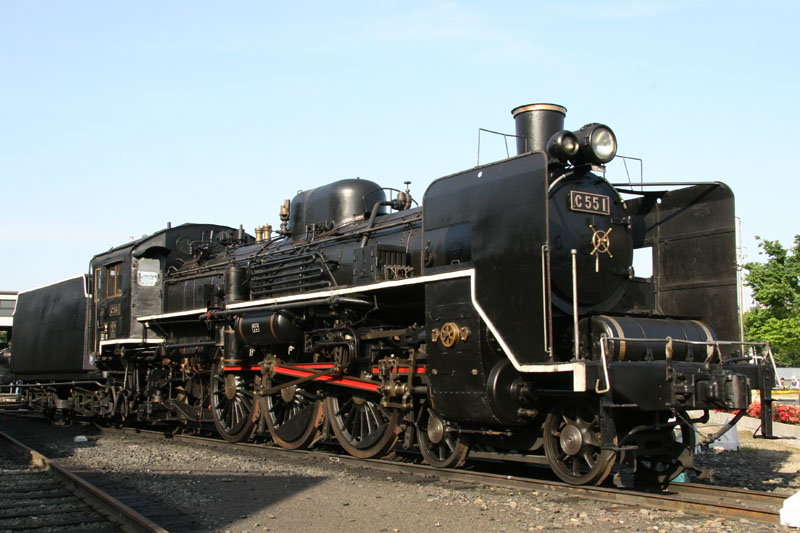
- Preserved C55 1 in May 2006
Type and origin
- Power type: Steam
- Designer: Hideo Shima
- Builder: Kawasaki Heavy Industries Rolling Stock Company, Kisha Seizo, Hitachi
- Build date: 1935-1937
- Total produced: 62 (JNR C55) 9 (TRA CT250)
Specifications
- Configuration
  - Whyte: 4-6-2 Pacific
- Gauge: 1,067 mm (3 ft 6 in)
- Driver dia.: 1,750 mm (5 ft 9 in)
- Length: 20,380 mm (66 ft 10 in)
- Height: 3,945 mm (12 ft 11.3 in)
- Loco weight: 66.04 t (65.00 long tons; 72.80 short tons)
- Total weight: 113.22 t (111.43 long tons; 124.80 short tons)
- Fuel type: Coal
- Boiler pressure: 14 kg/cm^{2} (1.37 MPa; 199 psi)
- Cylinders: 2
- Cylinder size: 510 mm × 660 mm (20 in × 26 in)
- Valve gear: Walschaerts
Performance figures
- Maximum speed: 100 km/h (62 mph)
Career
- Operators: JNR; Taiwan Railways
- Number in class: JNR: 62; TRA: 9
- Numbers: C55 1-C55 62 (JNR) CT251-CT259 (TRA)
- Nicknames: Shigogo
- Retired: 1975 (Japan) 1982 (Taiwan)
- Preserved: 4 (Japan) 2 (Taiwan)
- Scrapped: 1975 (Japan) 1982 (Taiwan)
- Disposition: Four preserved in Japan, two preserved in Taiwan, remainder scrapped

The Class C55 (C55形) is a type of 4-6-2 steam locomotive built in Japan from 1935 to 1937. A total of 62 Class C55 locomotives were built and designed by Hideo Shima.

Nine were supplied to the Taiwan Government Railway, where they became class CT250 after the nationalist takeover of Taiwan in 1945 and remained in service until October 1982. 21 locomotives numbered C55 20 - C55 40 were built as streamliners during the 1930s and 40s.

== Design ==
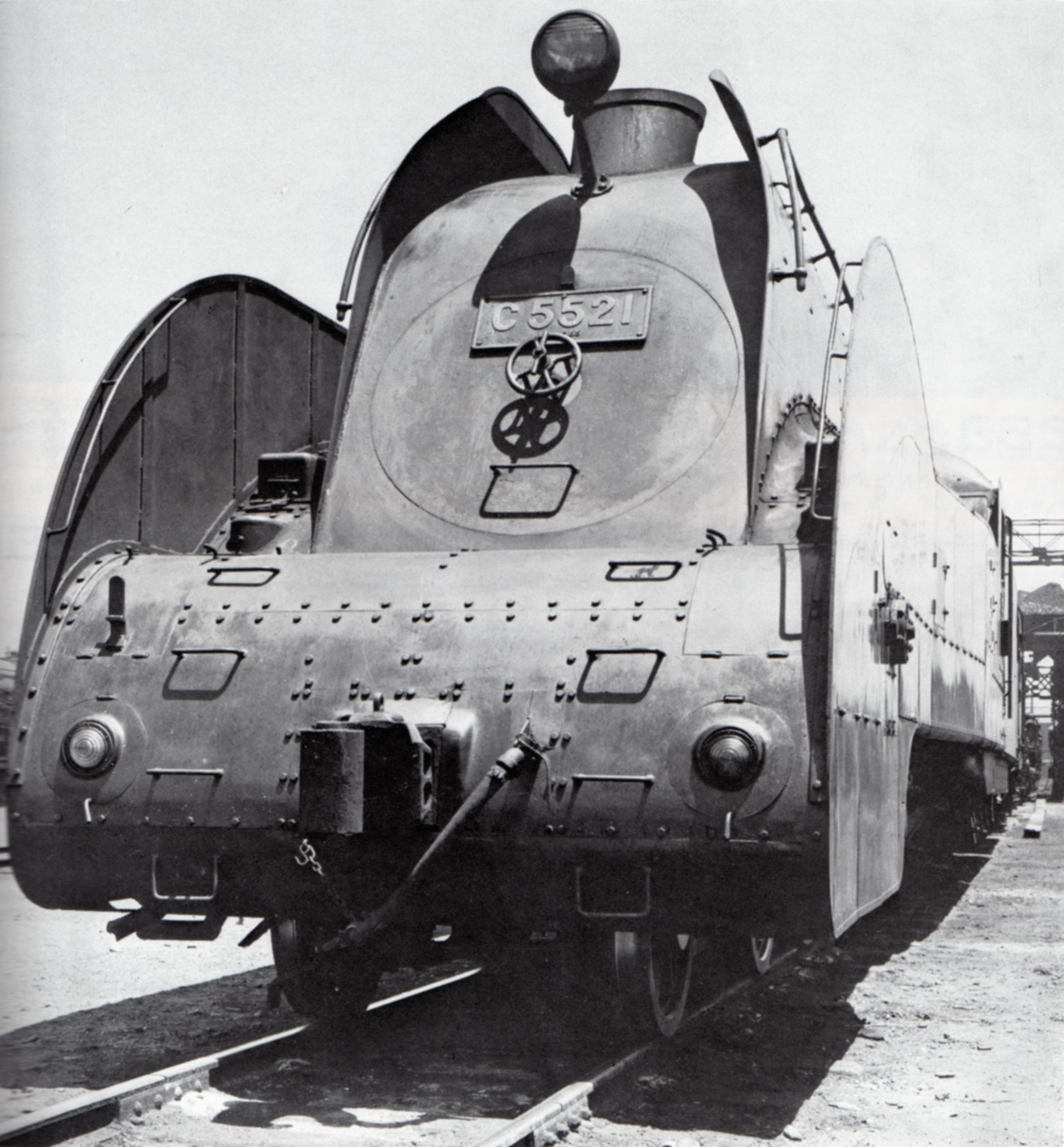
C55 21, one of the streamlined C55s

The Class C55 was designed in the 1930s as a successor to the Class C51 operated on routes connecting mid-sized cities (mainline successor to them was the Class C53). Production of the Class C54, originally intended for this role, was discontinued in 1931 after just 17 locomotives due to various design flaws. The C55's design incorporated many lessons learned from the C54's shortcomings, particularly in the structure of the main frame. Twenty C55 locomotives were built with a streamlined design, and they were the last Japanese locomotives to be equipped with driving wheels with spokes. The 63rd C55 was given a new class, the Class C57, due to changes in the design.

== Preserved examples ==
=== Japan ===
- C55 1: preserved at the Kyoto Railway Museum
- C55 50: preserved at the Otaru Museum in Otaru, Hokkaido
- C55 52: preserved in front of Yoshimatsu Station in Kagoshima Prefecture
- C55 53: preserved at Wakakusa Park in Oita, Oita
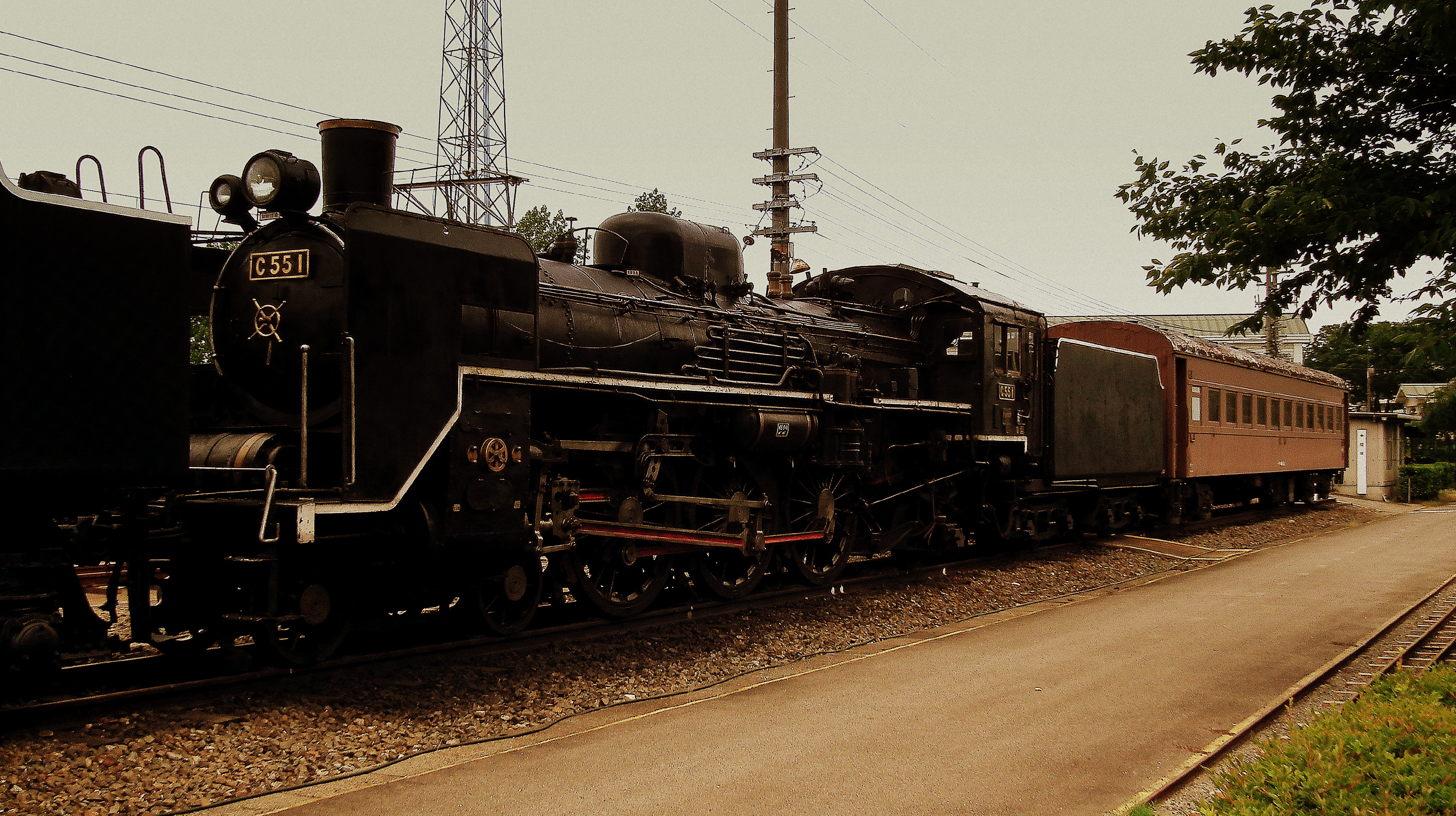
C55 1 preserved at the Umekoji Museum (later Kyoto Railway Museum) in June 2012

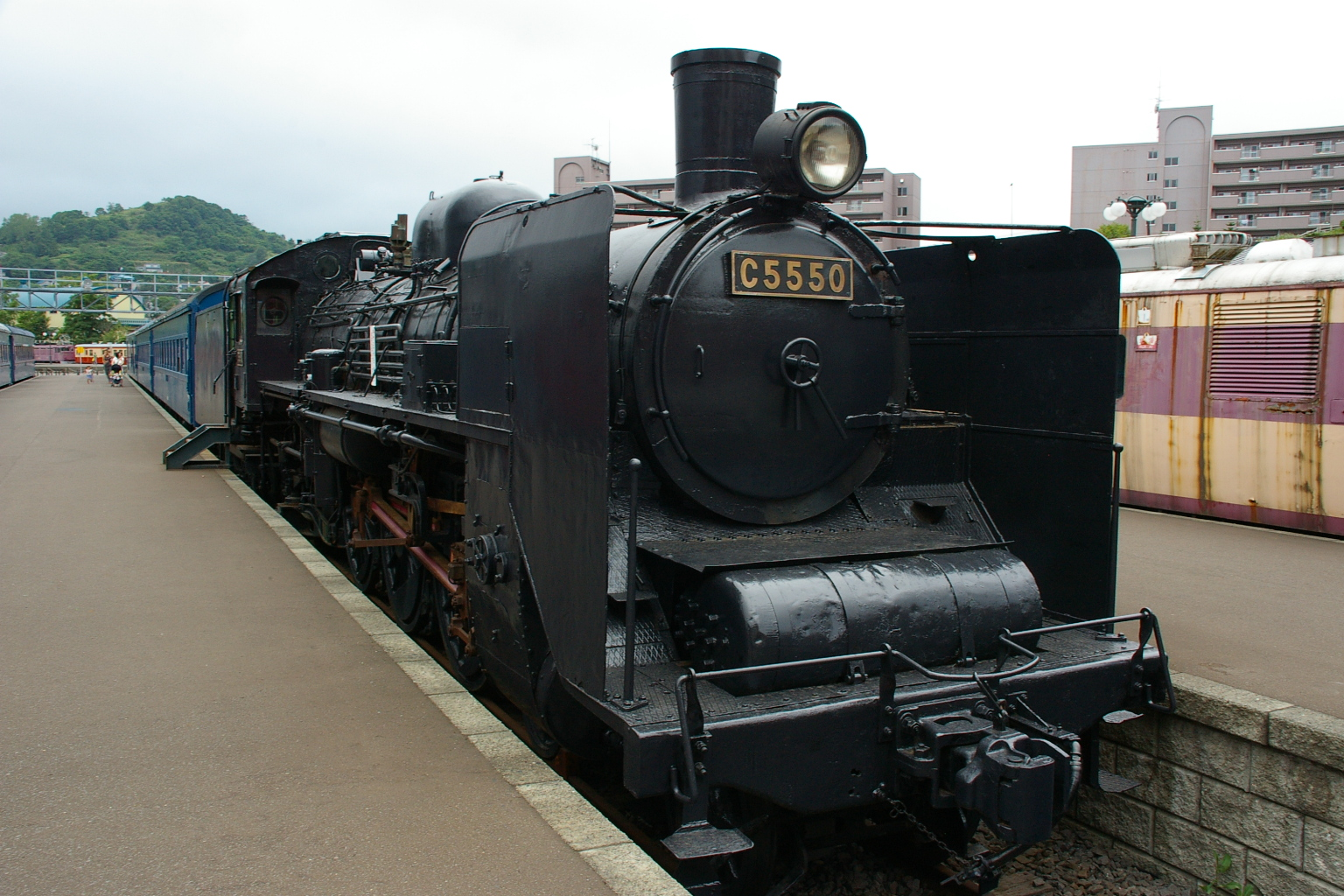
C55 50 preserved at the Otaru Museum in July 2007

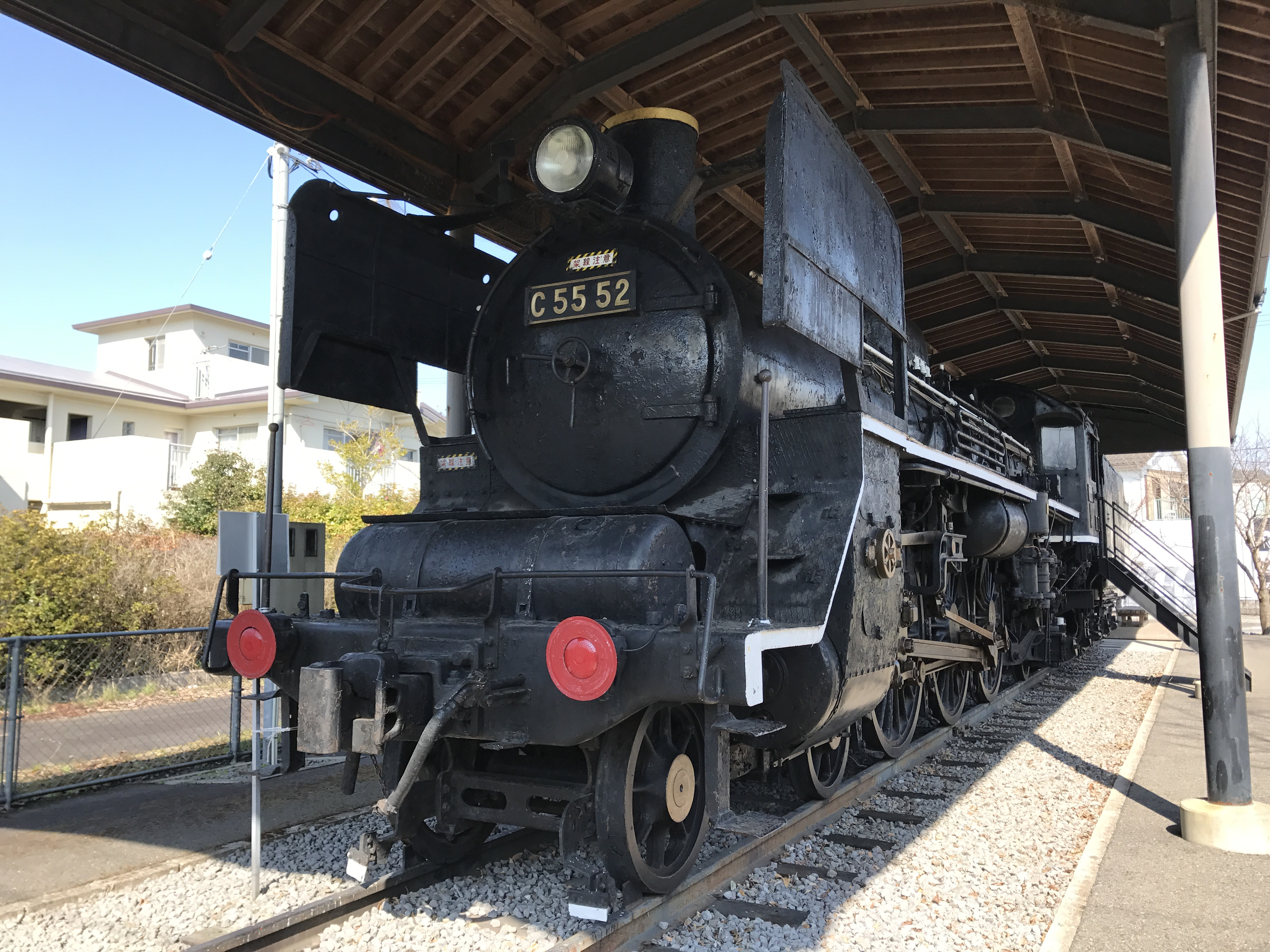
Preserved C55 52 in March 2017

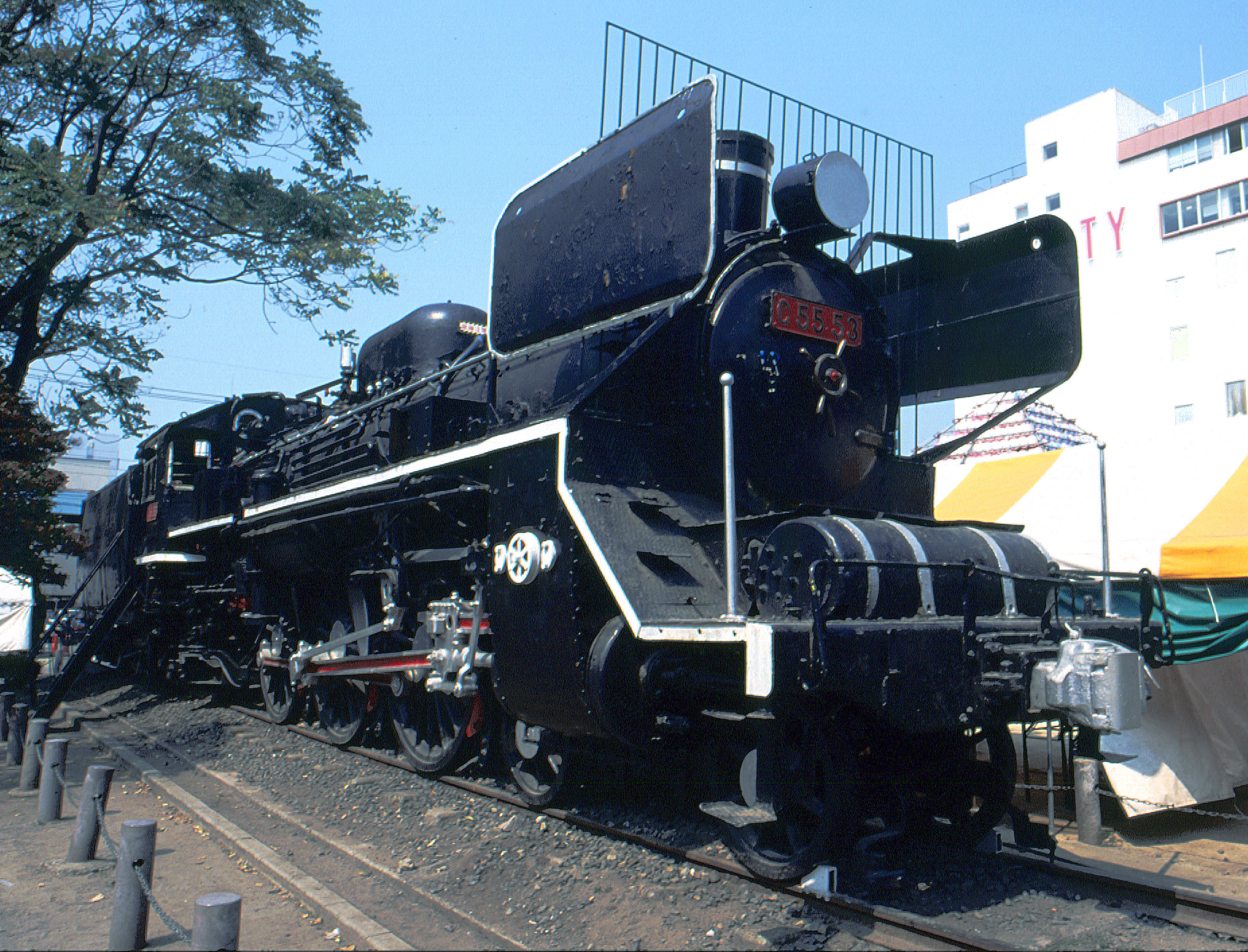
Preserved C55 53 in August 1994

== Taiwan ==
- CT251: preserved at Tainan City Sports Park
- CT259: preserved at the Takao Railway Museum
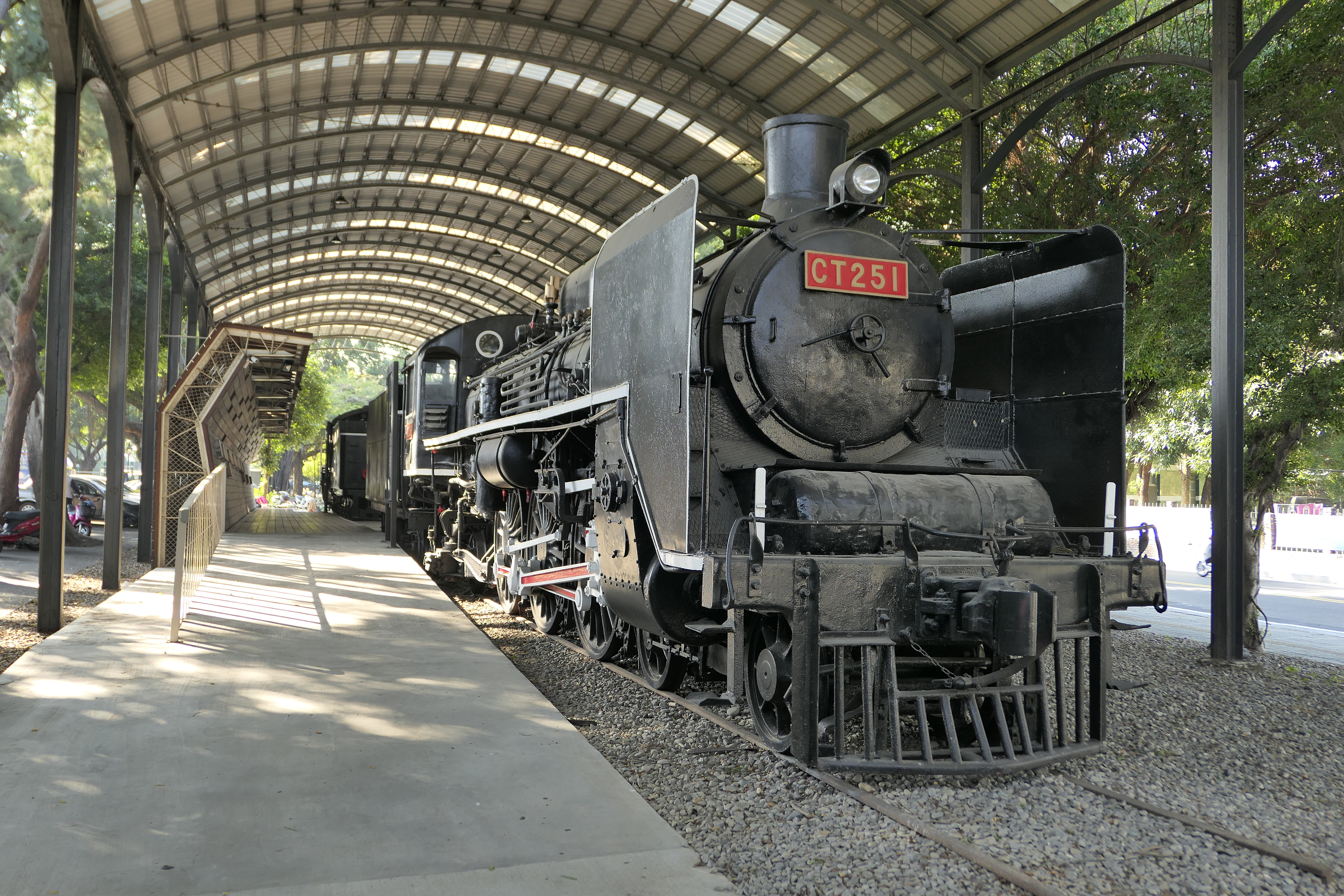
CT251 preserved at Tainan City Sports Park

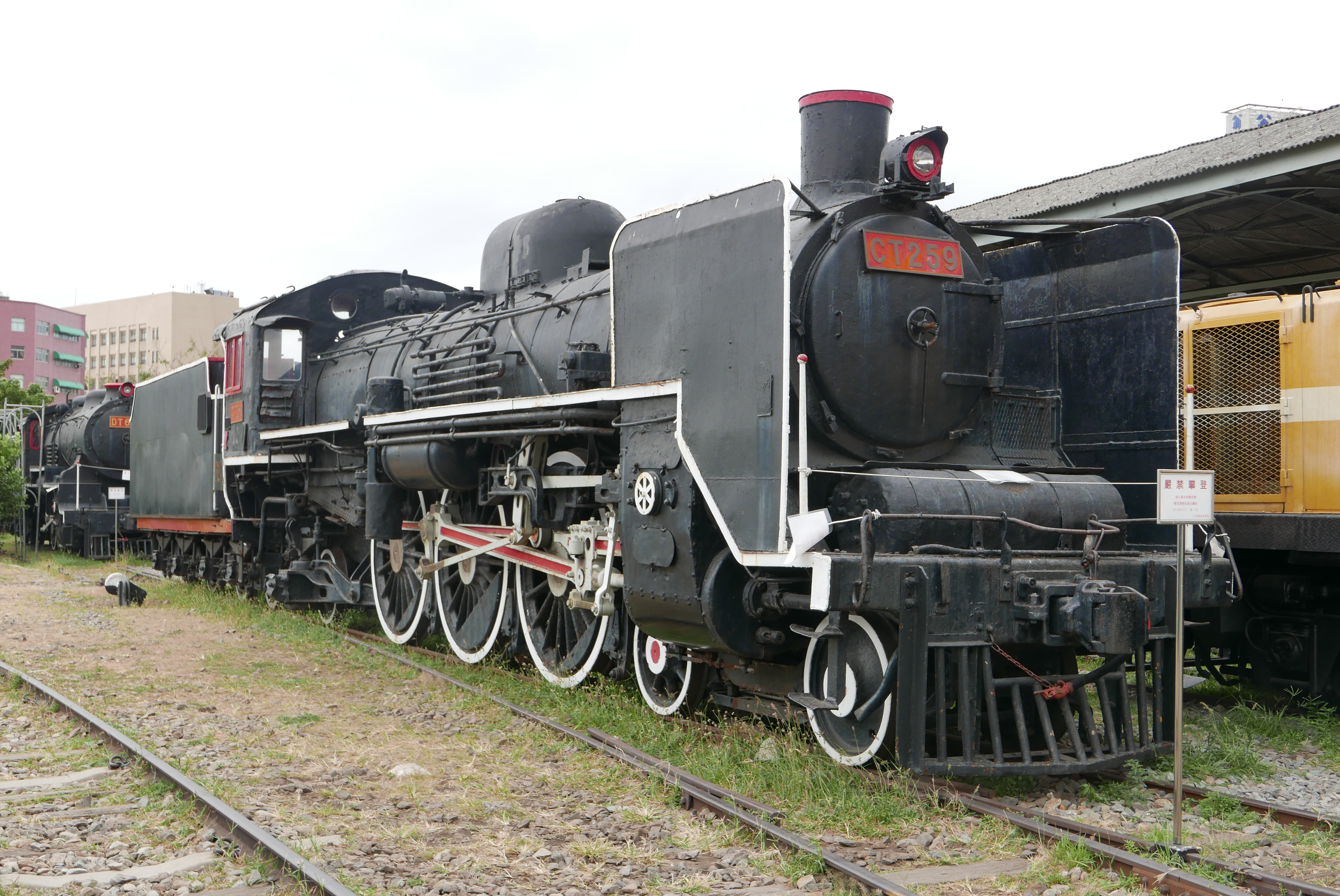
CT259 preserved at Takao Railway Museum

== See also ==
- Japan Railways locomotive numbering and classification
- JNR Class C54
- JNR Class C57
- JNR Class C56
