= Umekōji-Kyōtonishi Station =

Railway station in Kyoto, Japan

Umekōji-Kyōtonishi Station 梅小路京都西駅
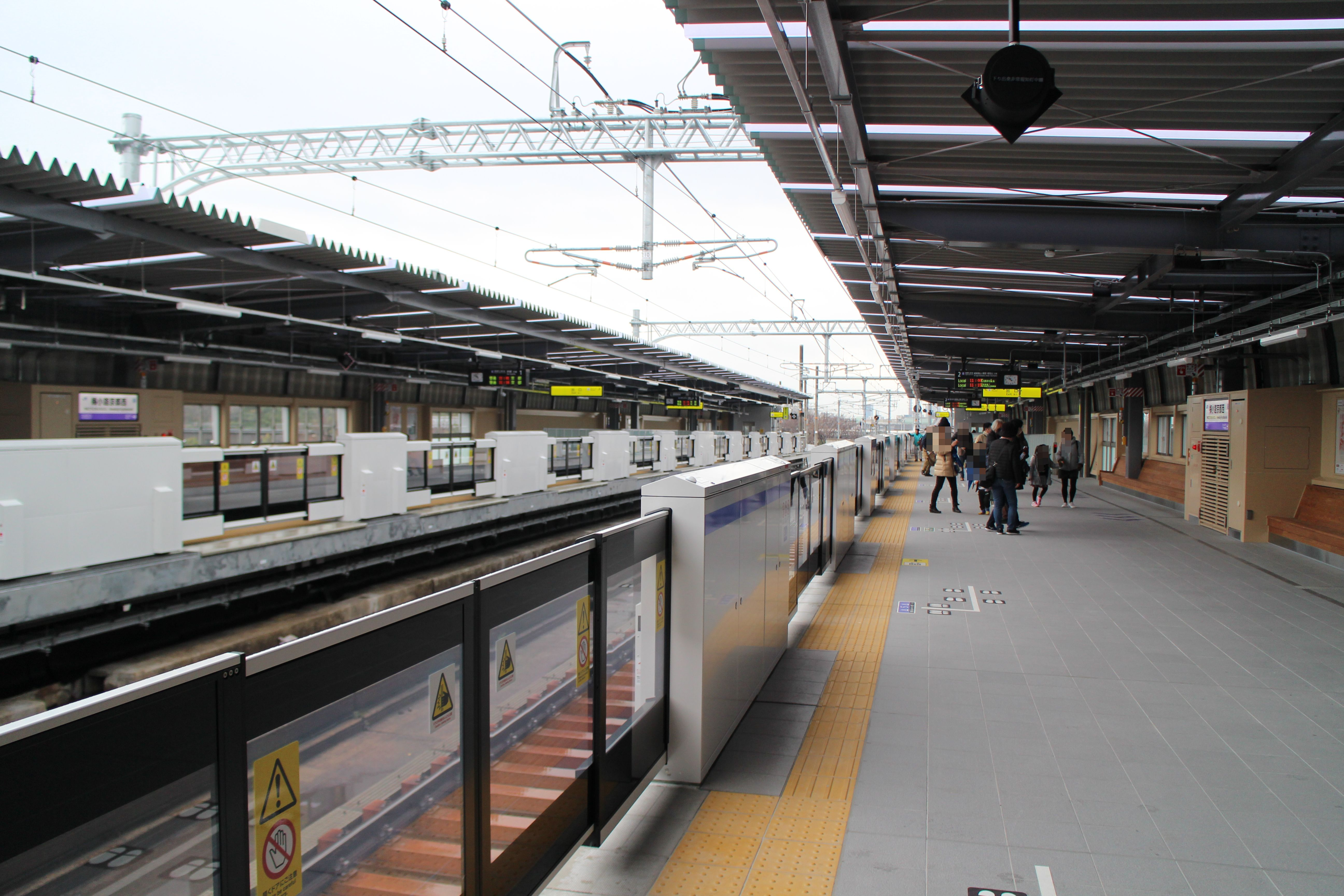
- Platform

General information
- Location: Kankijichō, Shimogyō-ku, Kyoto; Japan
- Coordinates: 34.988778°N 135.743167°E
- Operator: JR West
- Line: E Sagano Line
- Platforms: 2 side platforms
- Tracks: 2

Construction
- Structure type: Elevated

Other information
- Station code: JR-E02

History
- Opening: 16 March 2019

Passengers
- FY 2023: 7,570 daily

Services
Preceding station	JR West	Following station
Tambaguchi towards Sonobe	Sagano Line Local	Kyoto Terminus
Location
- Location within Kyoto Prefecture Location within Japan

Umekōji-Kyōtonishi Station (梅小路京都西駅, Umekōji-Kyōtonishi-eki) is a railway station located in Kankijichō, Shimogyō-ku, Kyoto. The station was opened on 16 March 2019, and operated by West Japan Railway Company (JR West), with station number JR-E02. The station is served by the Sagano Line (Sanin Main Line).

== History ==
The Umekoji Steam Locomotive Museum and Kyoto Aquarium, which opened on 14 March 2014, are both located in Umekoji Park. When the Umekoji Steam Locomotive Museum expanded into the new Kyoto Railway Museum, opening on 29 April 2016, the number of visitors increased significantly. However, they are 1.7 kilometers away from the nearest railway station, Kyoto Station. In May 2014, the Kyoto Chamber of Commerce and Industry submitted a proposal to build a new station between Kyoto and Tambaguchi, in order to increase convenience for traveler and boost the local economy. In August of the same year, the proposal was taken into consideration by the Kyoto Government.

On 2 February 2015, a Statement of Mutual Consensus was signed by JR West and the Kyoto Government, which states that the total cost of the station construction is 4.9 billion yen, with JR West paying 1.9 billion yen, and the Kyoto Government paying 1.5 billion yen, and the remaining 1.5 billion yen be paid by national subsidies.

=== Timeline ===
- 2 February 2015 - Mutual Consensus signed between City Government and JR West.
- 12 August 2016 - JR West announced the designs for the new station.
- 19 September 2016 - Ground-breaking Ceremony.
- 30 September ~ 1 October 2017 - Track elevation works.
- 26 March ~ 27 April 2018 - Public polling for station name.
- 20 July 2018 - Station name finalised by JR West to be Umekōji-Kyōtonishi Station. The tentative construction name was "JR Shichijō Station".
- 16 March 2019 - Opening of business.

== Namesake ==
On 20 July 2018, JR West was announced in a press conference that the name for this station is Umekōji-Kyōtonishi Station.

This name is a combination of several terms. Umekōji (梅小路) refers to Umekōji Park (梅小路公園), which is a signature landmark of the surrounding neighbourhood. Kyōtonishi (京都西) means Kyoto West, as the station is located 1.7 km (1.1 mi) west of Kyoto Station.

== Station layout ==
The station is elevated, and consist of 2 tracks and 2 platforms with platform doors installed.

1	■ Sagano Line	for Kyoto
2	■ Sagano Line	for Kameoka, Sonobe and Fukuchiyama

== Surrounding area ==
- Umekoji Park
- Kyoto Railway Museum
- Kyoto Aquarium

== See also ==
- List of railway stations in Japan
- Sagano Line
