= JNR Class C54 =

Class of 17 Japanese 4-6-2 steam locomotives

Class C54
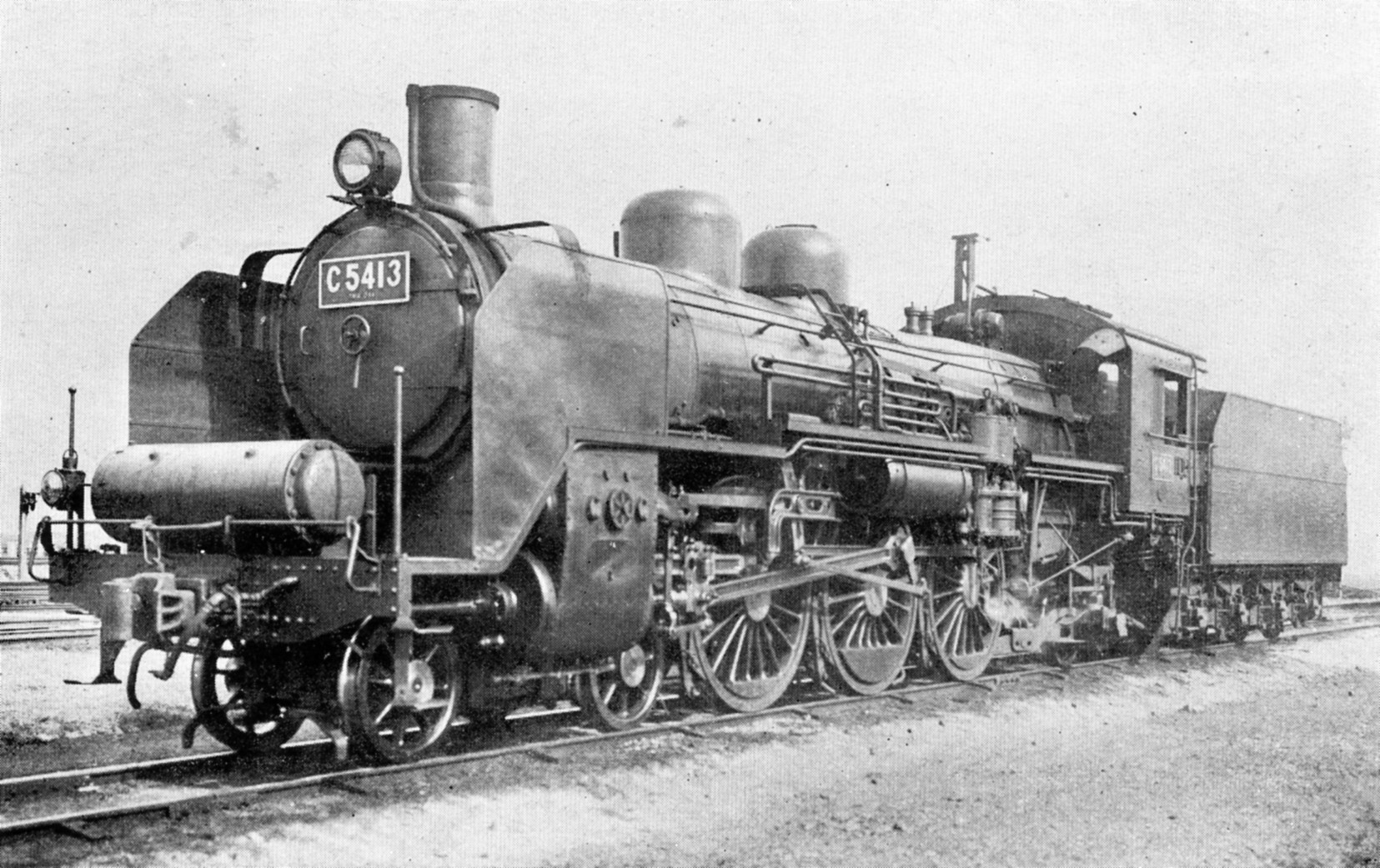
- C54 13 in January 1935
Type and origin
- Power type: Steam
- Builder: Kisha Seizō and Kawasaki Heavy Industries Rolling Stock Company
- Build date: 1931
- Total produced: 17
Specifications
- Configuration
  - Whyte: 4-6-2
- Gauge: 1,067 mm (3 ft 6 in)
- Driver dia.: 1,750 mm (5 ft 9 in)
- Length: 20,375 mm (66 ft 10.2 in)
- Height: 3,945 mm (12 ft 11.3 in)
- Loco weight: 67.50 t (66.43 long tons; 74.41 short tons)
- Total weight: 115.50 t (113.68 long tons; 127.32 short tons)
- Fuel type: Coal
Performance figures
- Maximum speed: 101 km/h (63 mph)
Career
- Operators: JNR
- Number in class: 17
- Numbers: C54 1-C54 17
- First run: 1931
- Last run: 1963
- Retired: 1963
- Withdrawn: 1963
- Scrapped: 1963
- Disposition: All scrapped

The Class C54 (C54形) is a type of 4-6-2 steam locomotive built in Japan in 1931 and designed by Hideo Shima and built by Kisha Seizō and Kawasaki Heavy Industries Rolling Stock Company. A total of 17 were built in 1931 and numbered C54 1-C54 17. All were retired by 1963 after 32 years of service and scrapped later that year.

== See also ==
- Japan Railways locomotive numbering and classification
- JNR Class C53
- JNR Class C55
