= JNR Class B20 =

Japanese steam locomotive class

Class B20
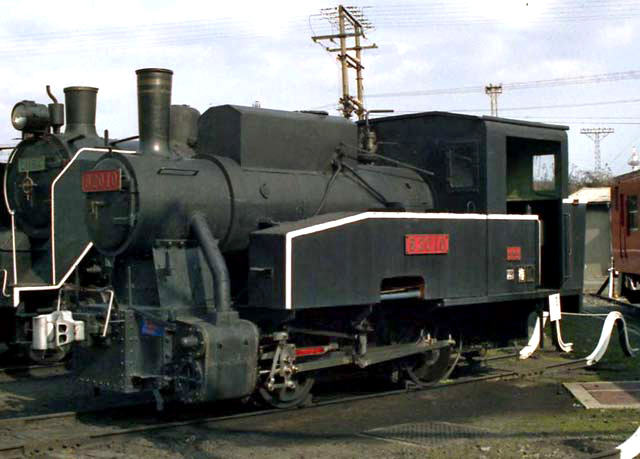
- B20 10
Type and origin
- Power type: Steam
- Builder: Tateyama Heavy Industries
- Build date: 1944-1947
- Total produced: 15
Specifications
- Configuration
  - Whyte: 0-4-0T
- Gauge: 1,067 mm (3 ft 6 in)
- Driver dia.: 860 mm (2 ft 10 in)
- Length: 7,000 mm (23 ft 0 in)
- Loco weight: 20.3 t (20.0 long tons; 22.4 short tons)
Performance figures
- Maximum speed: 45 km/h (28 mph)
- Tractive effort: 3,190 kgf (31.3 kN; 7,000 lbf)
Career
- Retired: 1972
- Disposition: Two preserved, remainder scrapped

The Class B20 is a type of 0-4-0T steam locomotive built for the Japanese Government Railways during the period 1944–47. They were built by Tateyama Heavy Industries who manufactured a total of fifteen Class B20 locomotives.

== Preserved examples ==
- B20 1 - Iwamizawa, Hokkaidō
- B20 10 - At Umekoji Steam Locomotive Museum in Kyoto.

== See also ==
- Japan Railways locomotive numbering and classification
