= Kyoto Railway Museum =

Railway museum in Kyoto, Japan

- 京都鉄道博物館
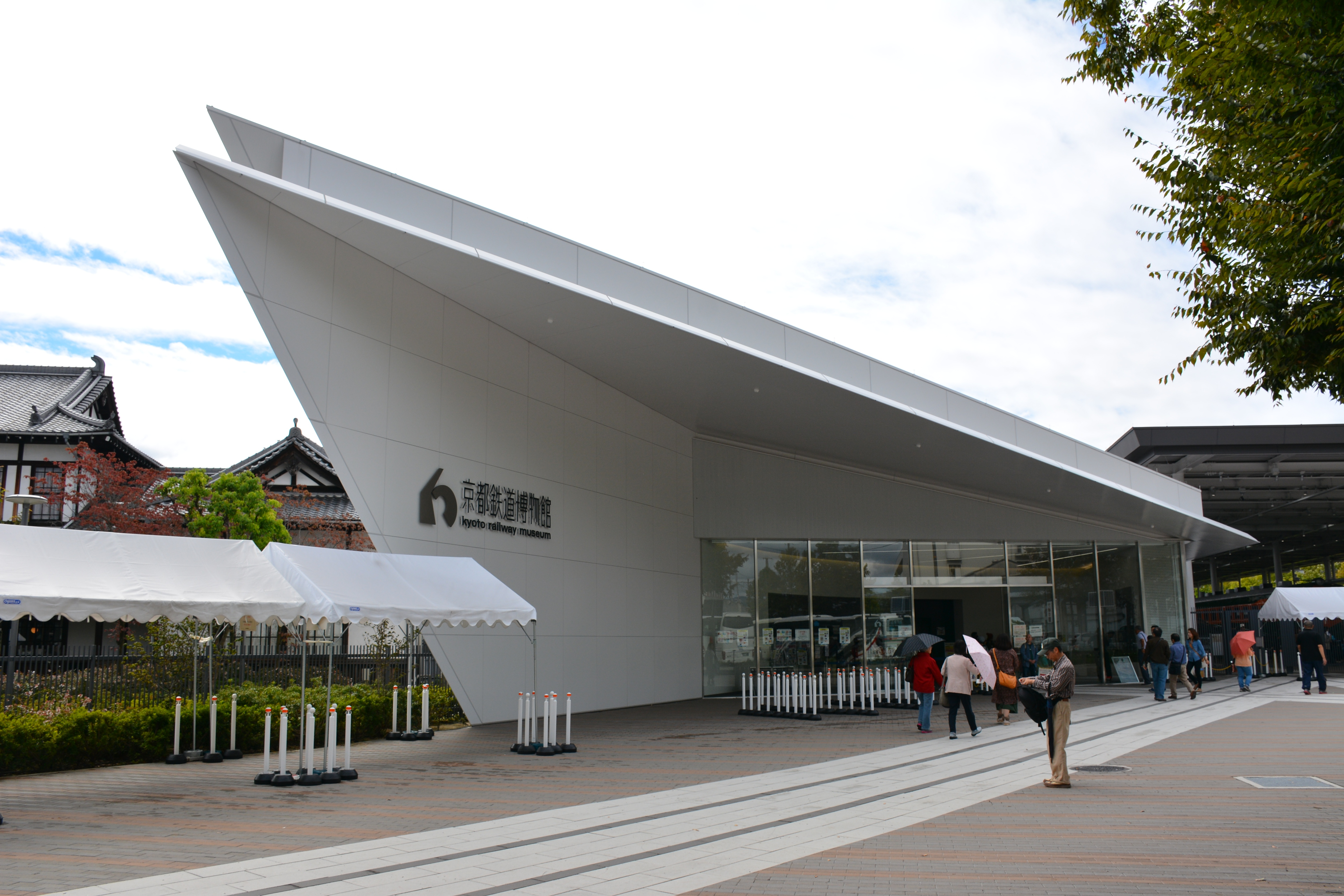
- The museum entrance in October 2016

- Location of the museum Kyoto Railway Museum (Japan)
- Former name: Umekoji Steam Locomotive Museum
- Established: October 10, 1972 (as Umekoji Steam Locomotive Museum); April 29, 2016 (as Kyoto Railway Museum)
- Location: Shimogyō-ku, Kyoto, Japan
- Coordinates: 34°59′14″N 135°44′33″E
- Type: Railway museum
- Owner: JR West
- Public transit access: Umekōji-Kyōtonishi Station, JR West Sagano Line
- Parking: Umekoji Park
- Website: www.kyotorailwaymuseum.jp/en/

The Kyoto Railway Museum (京都鉄道博物館, Kyōto Tetsudō Hakubutsukan) (formerly the Umekoji Steam Locomotive Museum (梅小路蒸気機関車館, Umekōji Jōkikikansha-kan) until 2016) is a railway museum in Shimogyō-ku, Kyoto, Japan. The original Umekoji Steam Locomotive Museum opened in 1972, but was expanded and modernized in 2016, becoming the Kyoto Railway Museum.

The museum is owned by the West Japan Railway Company (JR West) and operated by the Transportation Culture Promotion Foundation.

== Exhibition zones ==
The museum is divided into the following exhibition areas, including the twenty-track roundhouse built in 1914.

- Promenade
- Main hall
- Twilight Plaza
- Roundhouse
- Former Nijō Station
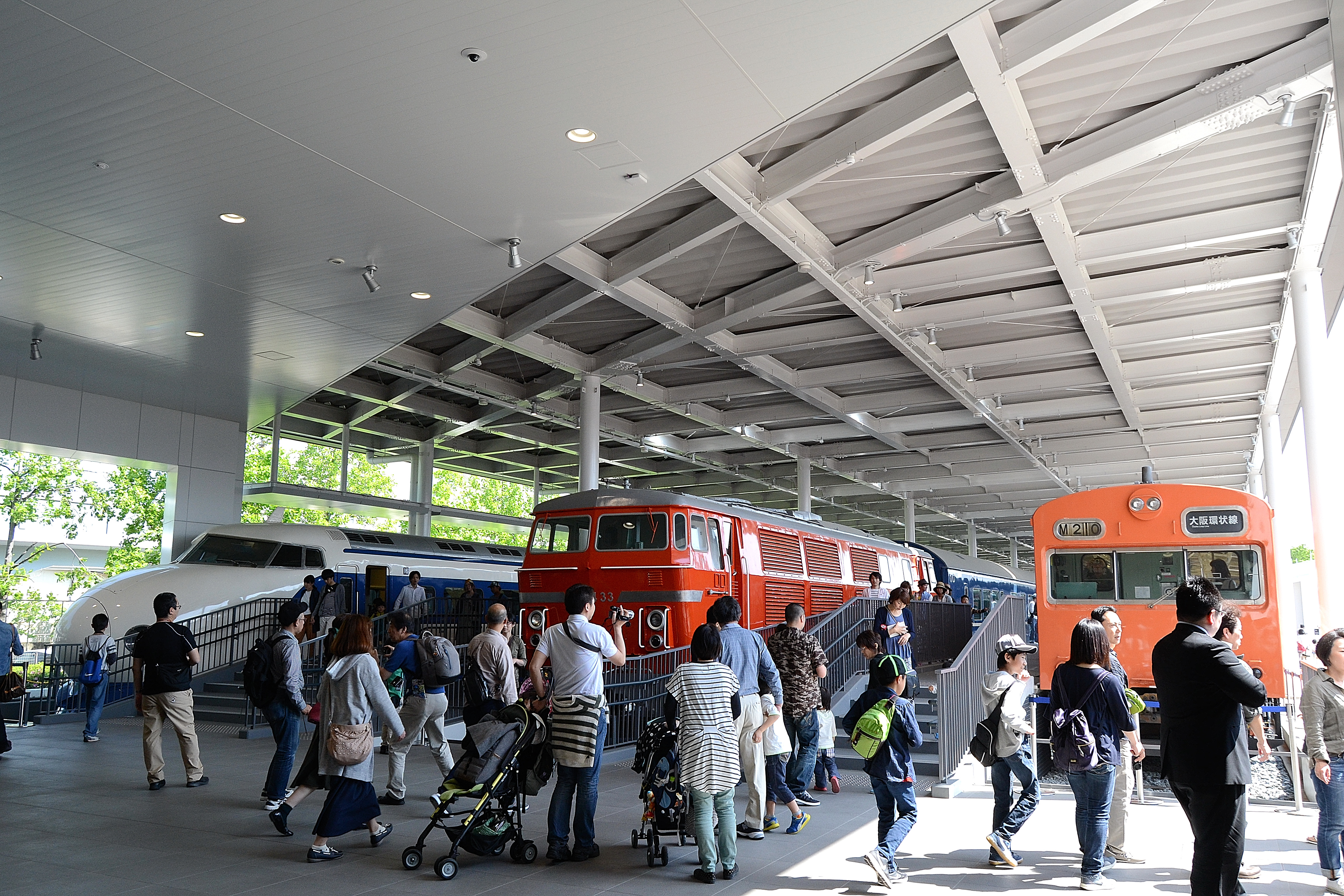
The Promenade area in May 2016

=== Main hall ===
This is a three-storey building completed in April 2016; it is the main exhibit area.

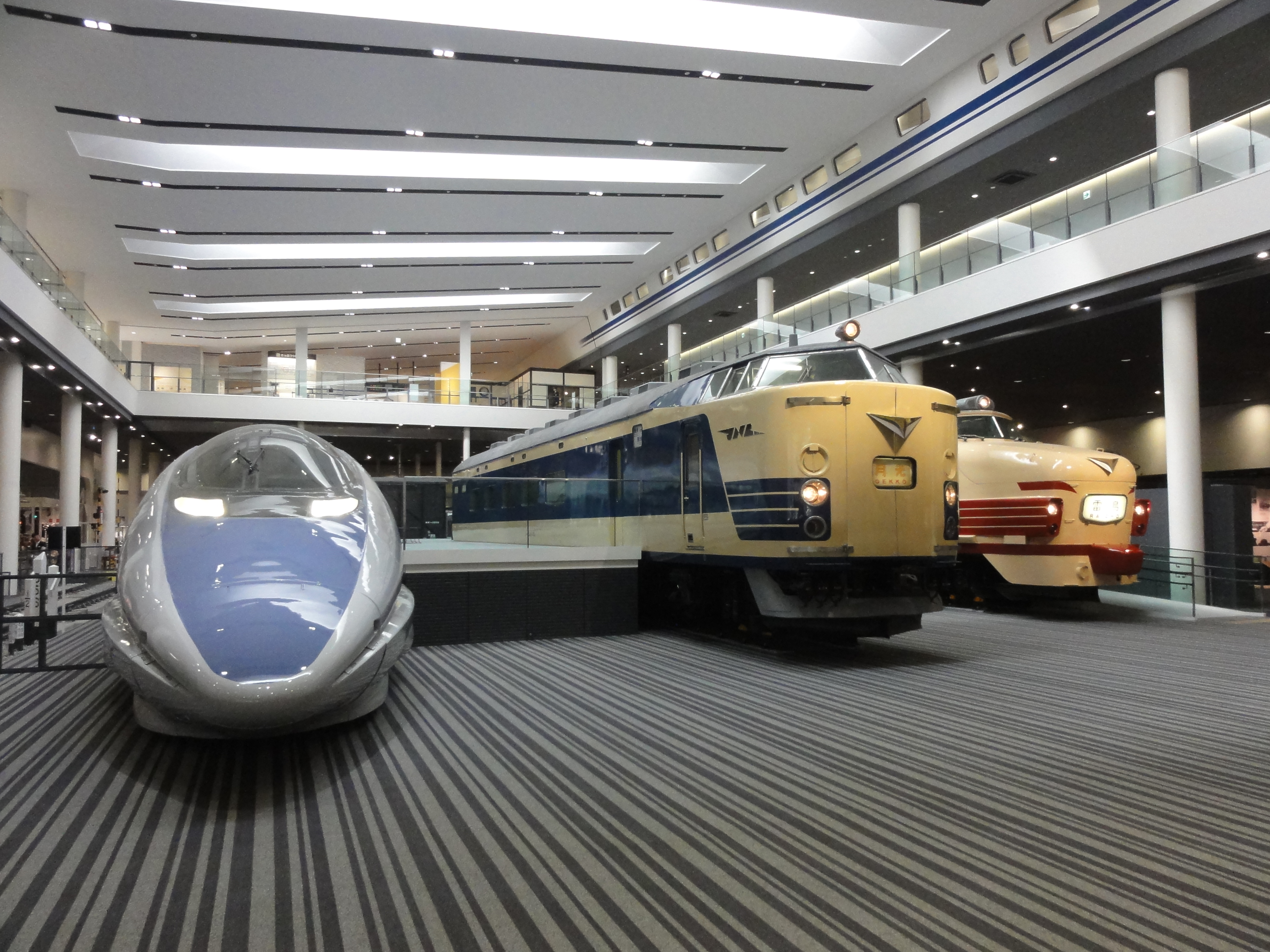
Exhibits in the Main hall in May 2016

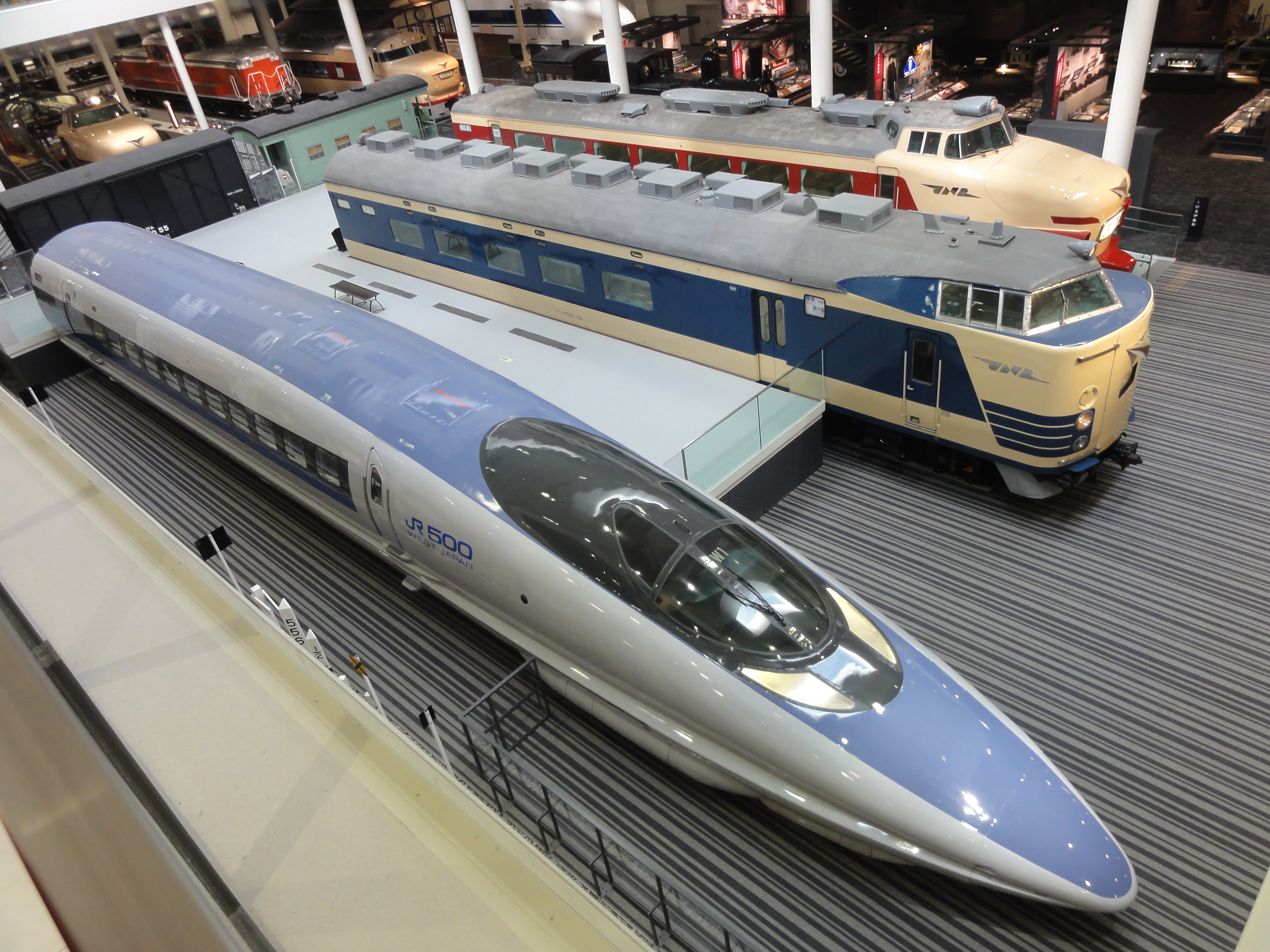
The Main hall viewed from the second floor in May 2016

=== Roundhouse ===
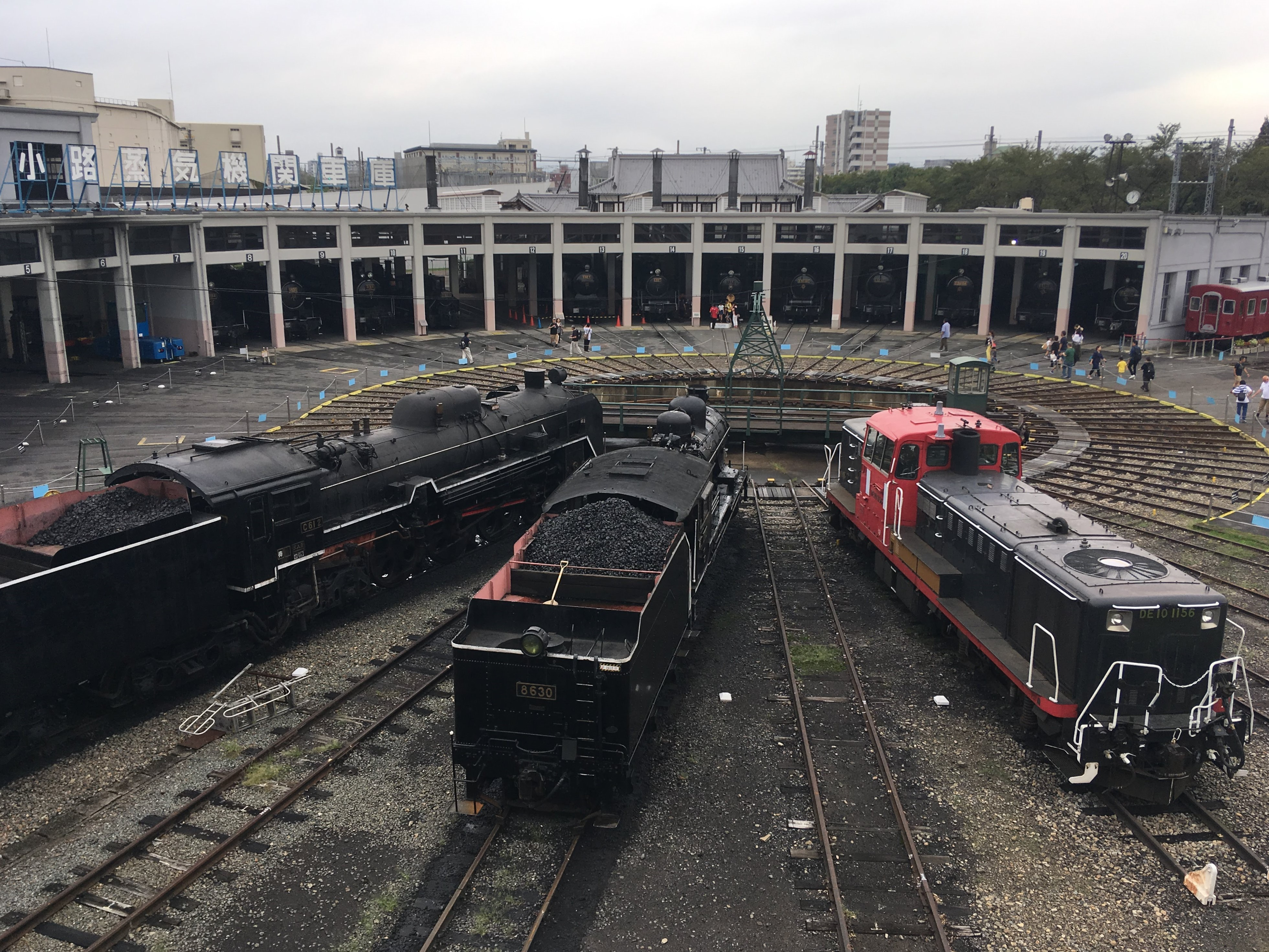
Roundhouse of the Kyoto Railway Museum

The 1914 roundhouse was built surrounding a turntable. It is an Important Cultural Property designated by the Government of Japan as the oldest reinforced-concrete car shed extant in the country.

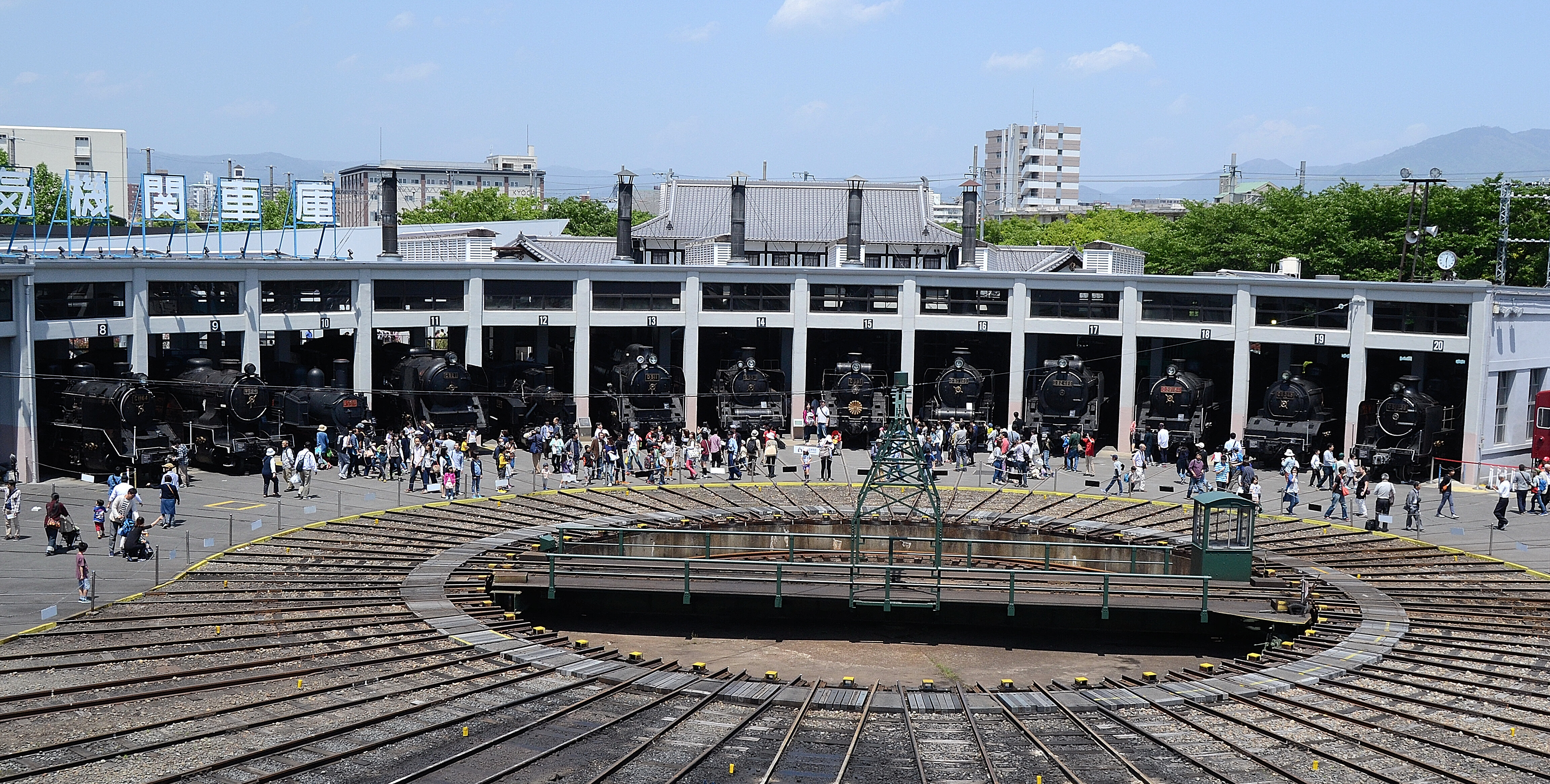
The roundhouse in May 2016

=== Former Nijo Station ===
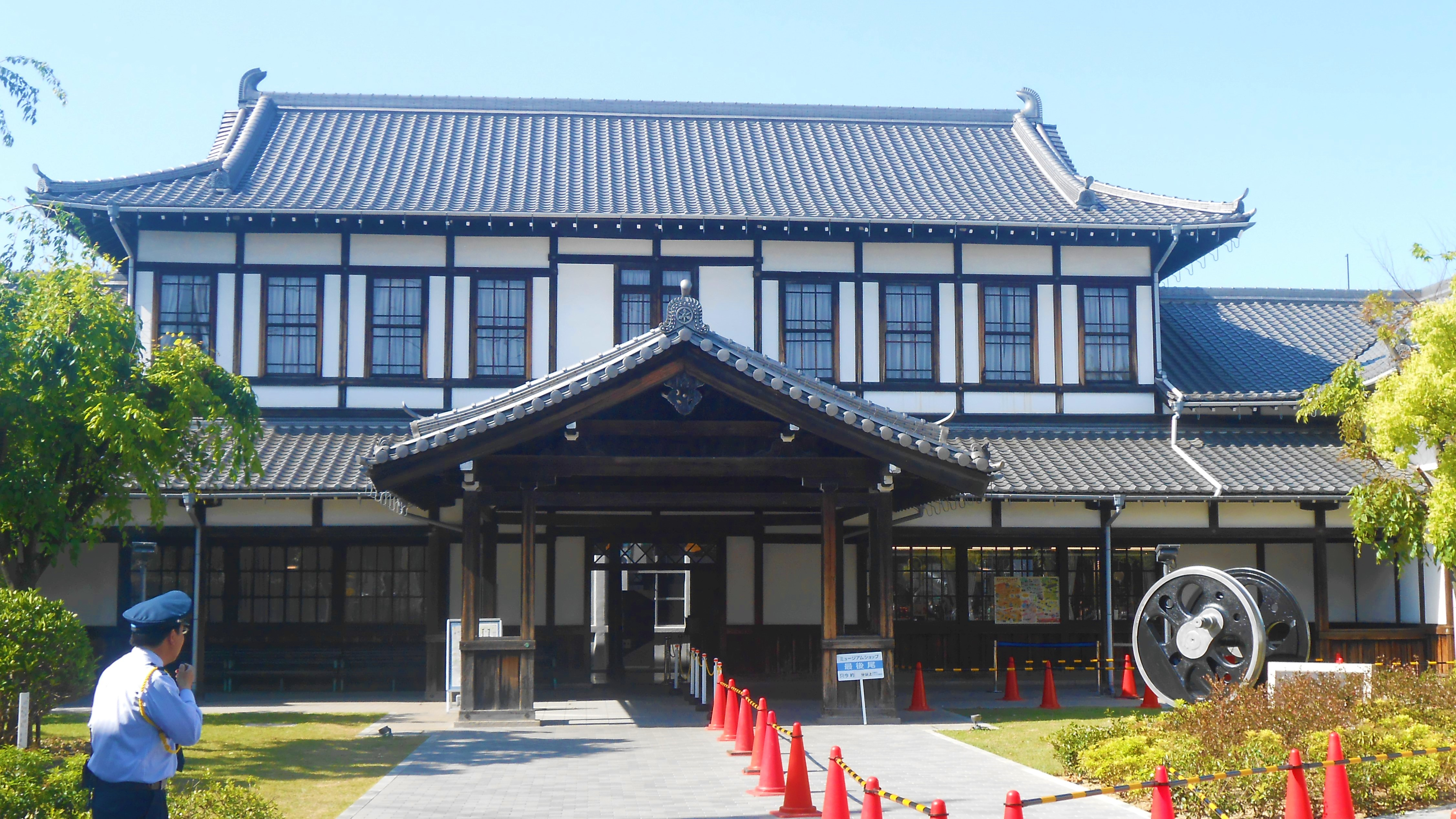
Nijo Station building

This two-storey structure was formerly part of Nijō Station in Kyoto until March 1996, and subsequently demolished and rebuilt at the Umekoji Steam Locomotive Museum, where it formed the entrance building. From April 2016 onwards, it acts as the museum exit and hosts the museum shop.

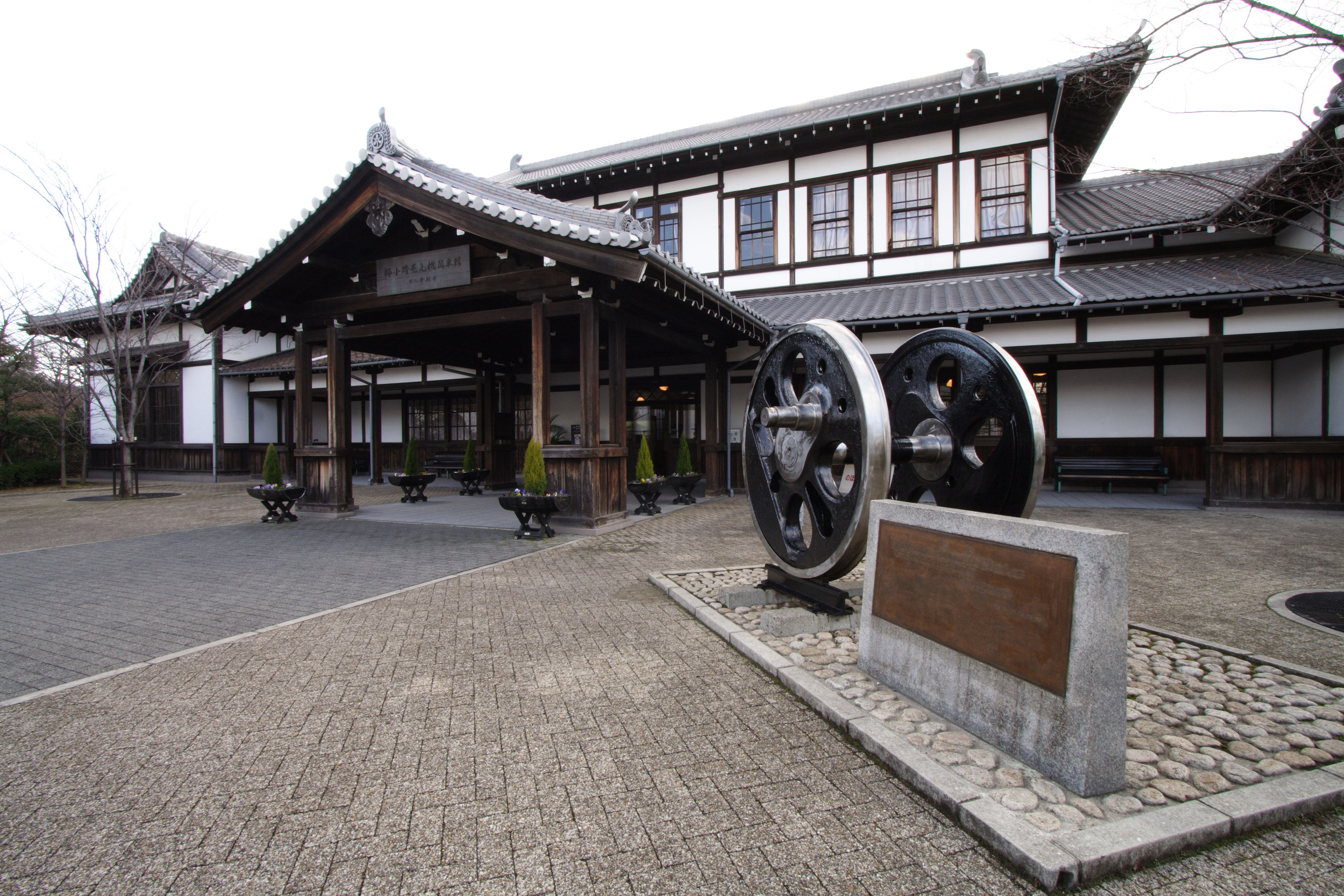
The former Nijo Station building in February 2006

== Exhibits ==
As of April 2026, a total of 54 rolling stock items are on display at the museum.

=== Steam locomotives ===
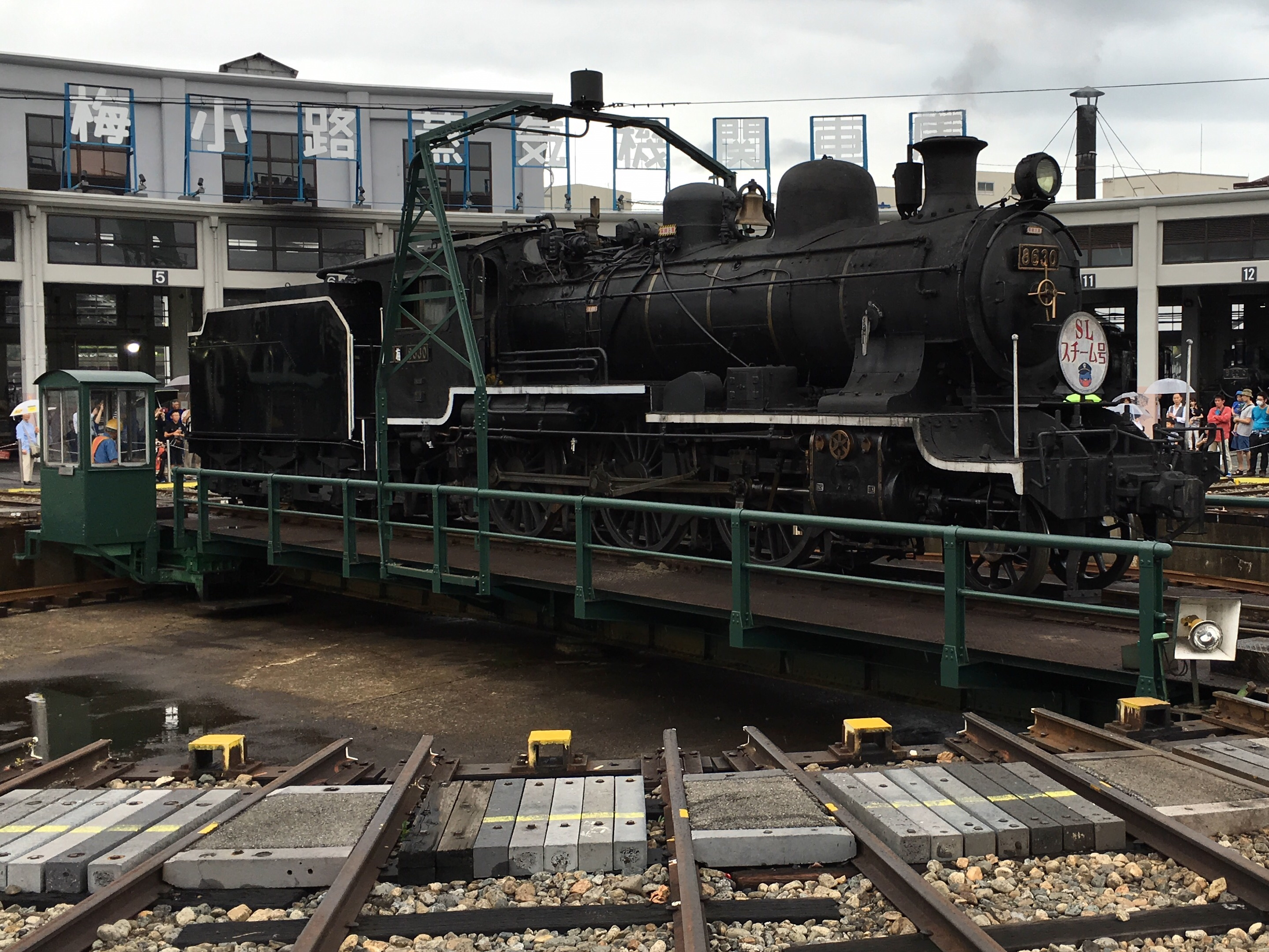
8620 steam locomotive 8630 on the Umekoji Locomotive turntable

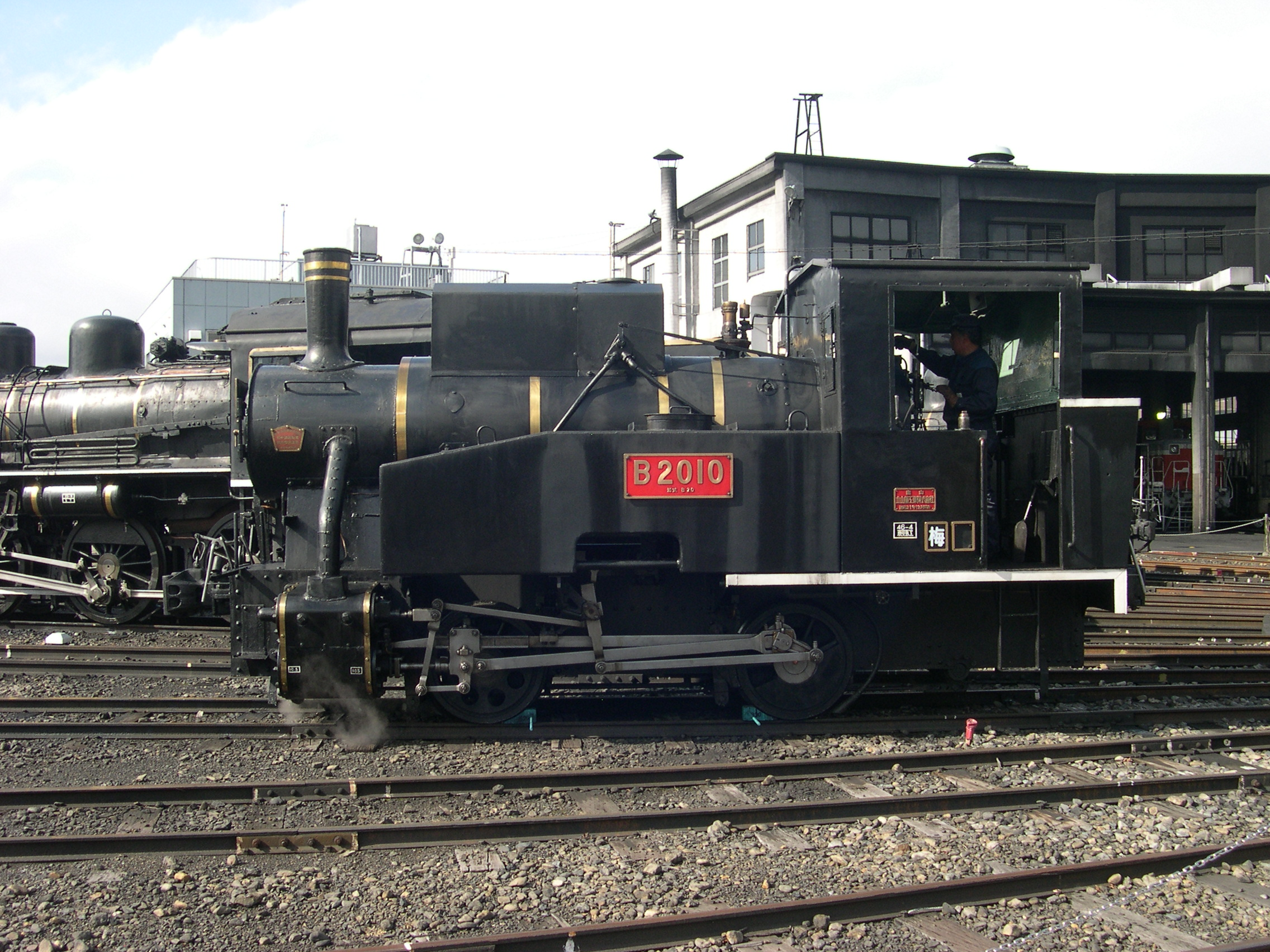
B20 10 in February 2006

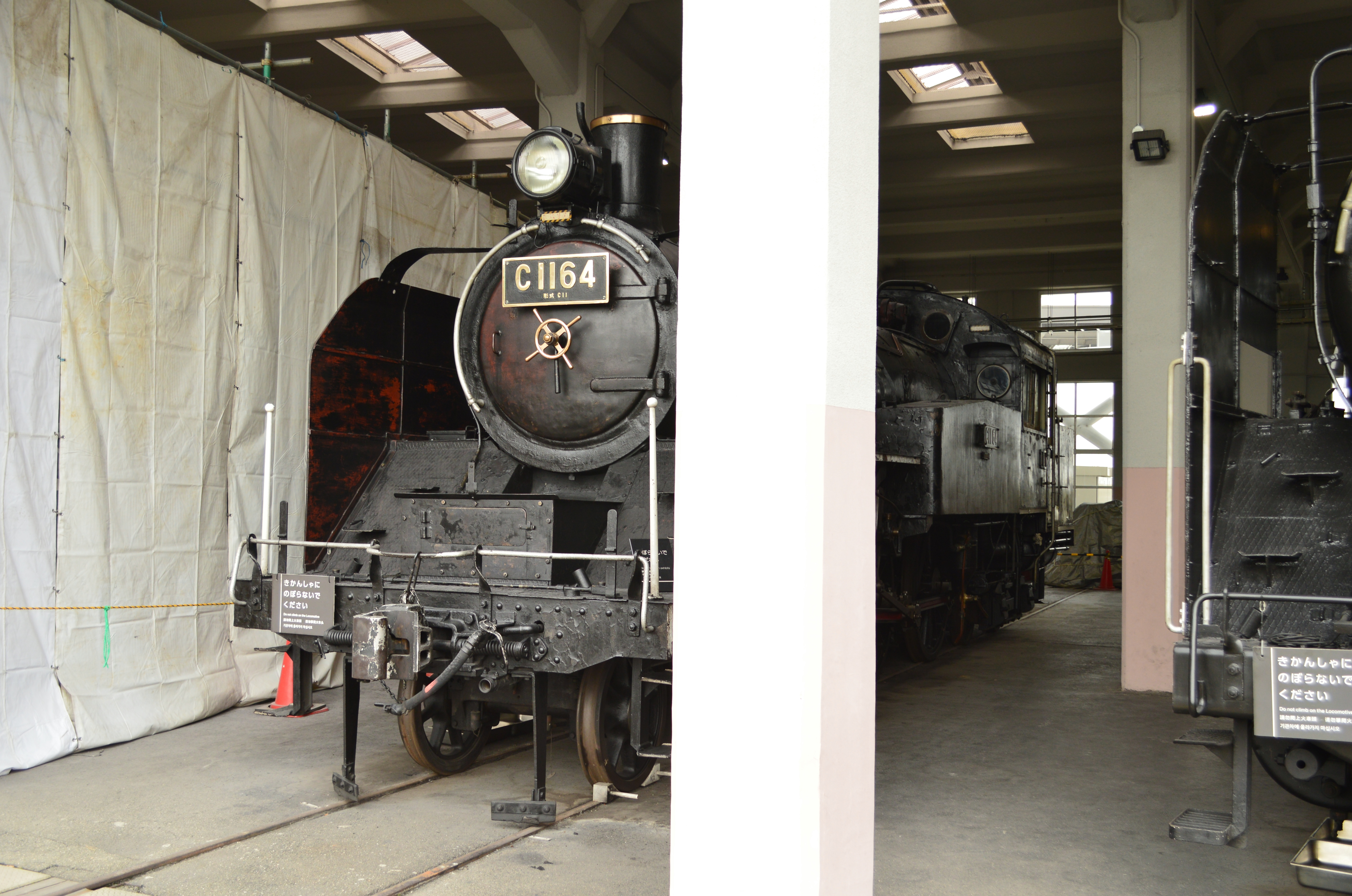
C11 64

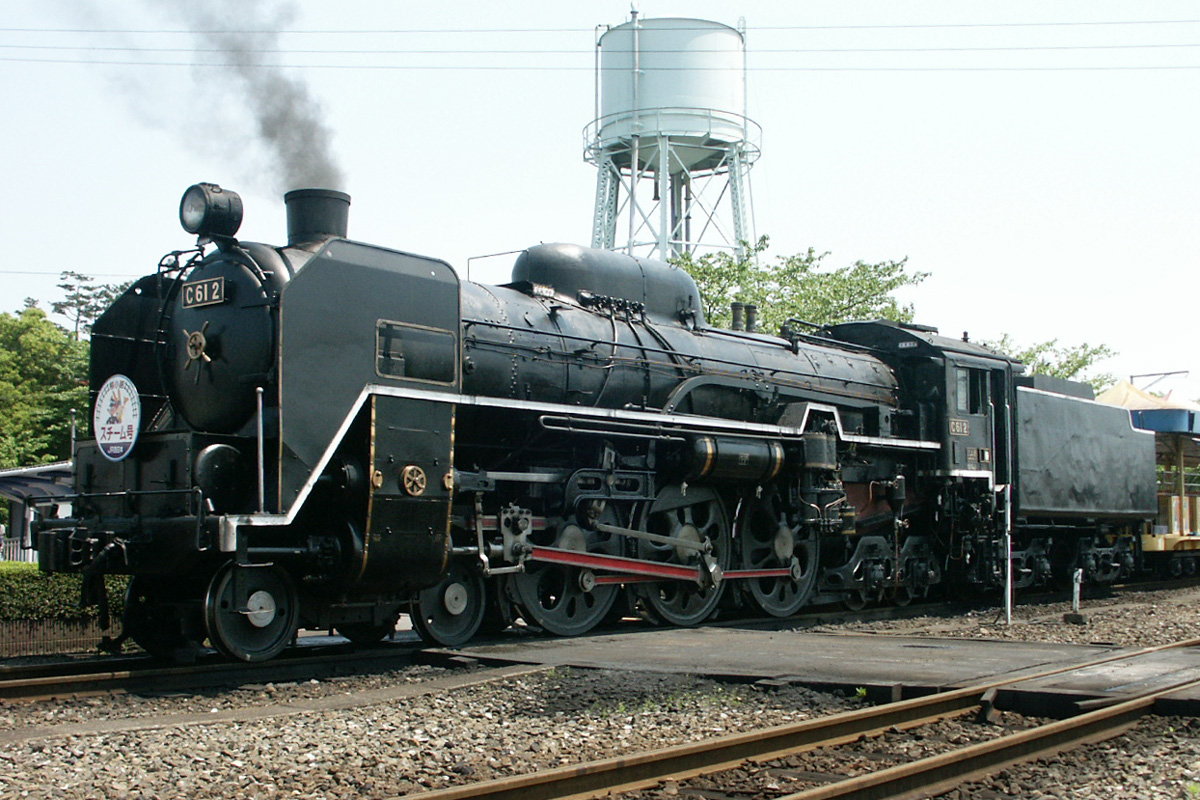
C61 2

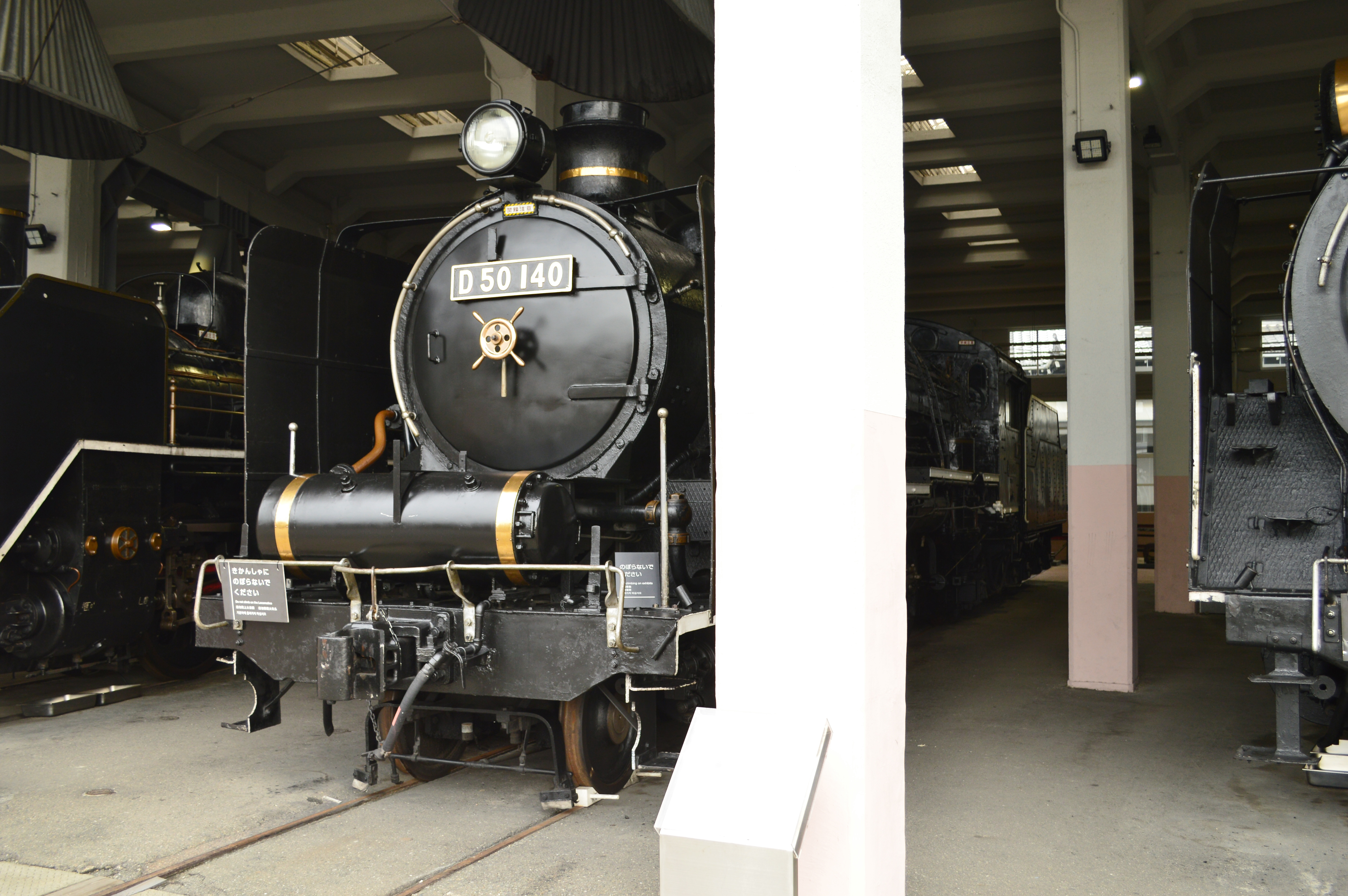
D50 140

Type	Number (and name if applicable)	Manufacturer	Year built	Exhibition area	Operational
JGR Class 7100	1/7105 Yoshitsune	H.K. Porter (USA)	1880	Roundhouse	*
JGR Class 1800	40/1801	Kitson & Company (England)	1881	Main hall	
JGR Class 1070	1080	Dübs & Company (Scotland)	1901	Roundhouse	
JGR Class 230	233	Kisha Seizo	1903	Main hall	
JGR Class 8620	8630	Kisha Seizo	1914	Roundhouse	*
JNR Class 9600	9633	Kawasaki Dockyard	1914	Roundhouse	
JNR Class D50	D50 140	Hitachi	1926	Roundhouse	
JNR Class C51	C51 239	Kisha Seizo	1927	Roundhouse	
JNR Class C53	C53 45	Kisha Seizo	1928	Roundhouse	
JNR Class C11	C11 64	Kawasaki Sharyo	1935	Roundhouse	
JNR Class C55	C55 1	Kawasaki Sharyo	1935	Roundhouse	
JNR Class D51	D51 1	Kawasaki Sharyo	1936	Roundhouse	
JNR Class C57	C57 1	Kawasaki Sharyo	1937	Roundhouse	*
JNR Class D51	D51 200	JNR Hamamatsu	1938	Roundhouse	*
JNR Class C58	C58 1	Kisha Seizo	1938	Roundhouse	
JNR Class C56	C56 160	Kawasaki Sharyo	1939	Roundhouse	*
JNR Class B20	B20 10	Tateyama	1946	Roundhouse	*
JNR Class D52	D52 468	Mitsubishi	1946	Roundhouse	
JNR Class C59	C59 164	Hitachi	1946	Roundhouse	
JNR Class C62	C62 1	Hitachi	1948	Roundhouse	
JNR Class C62	C62 2	Hitachi	1948	Roundhouse	*
JNR Class C61	C61 2	Mitsubishi	1948	Roundhouse	*
JNR Class C62	C62 26	Kawasaki Sharyo	1948	Promenade	

=== Diesel locomotives ===
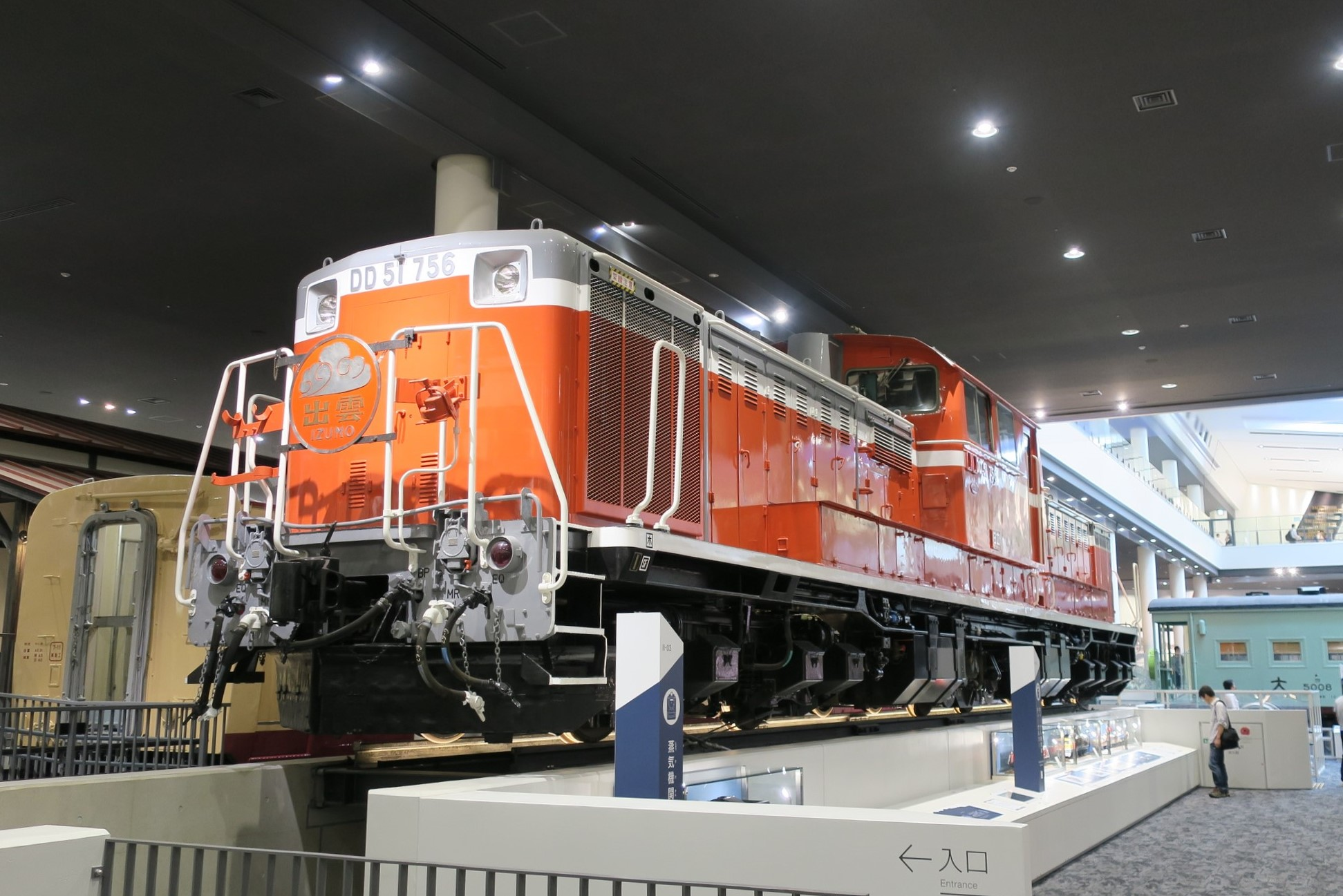
DD51 756 on display in October 2016

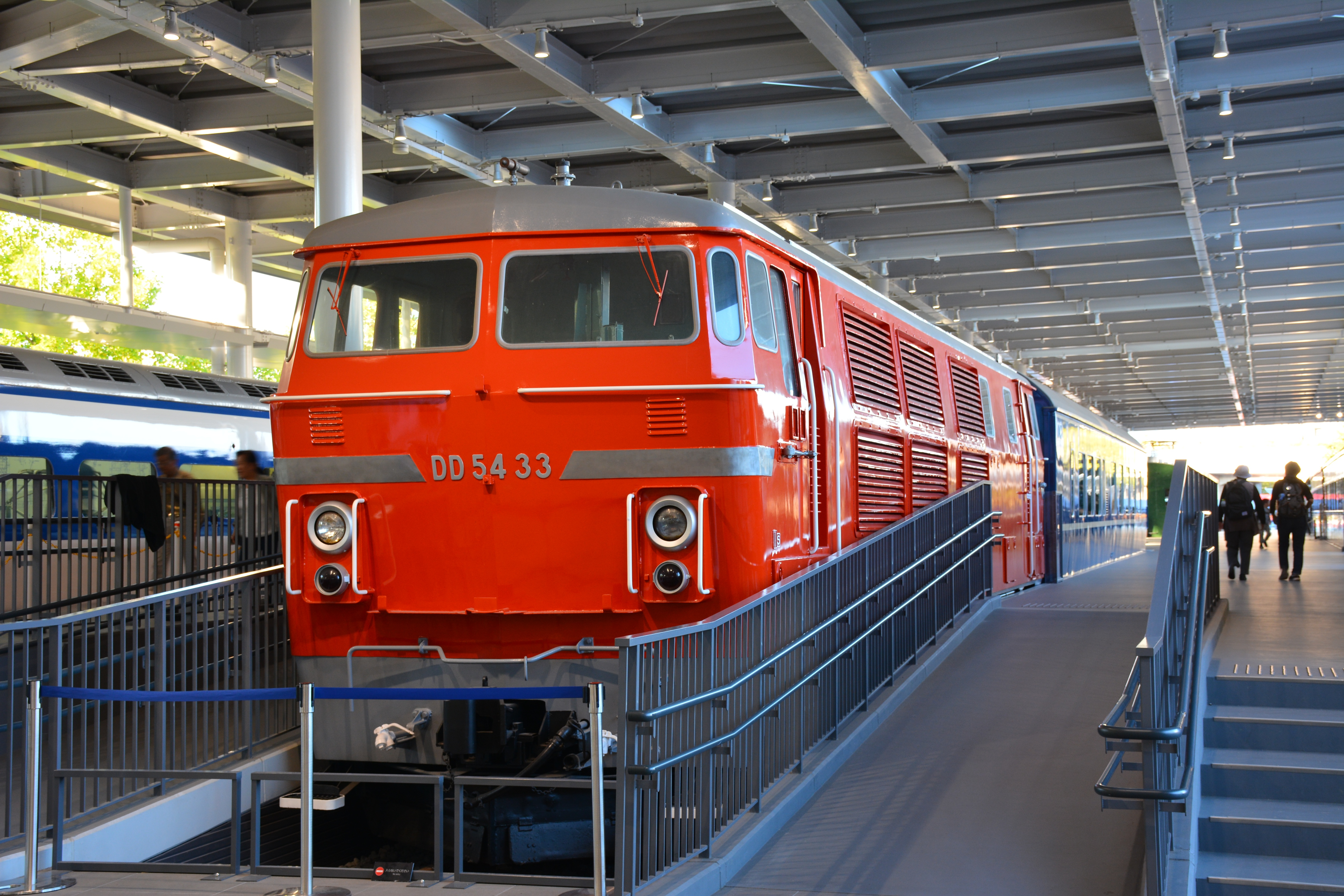
DD54 33 on display in October 2016

Type	Number	Manufacturer	Year built	Exhibition area	Remarks
Class DD54	DD54 33	Mitsubishi	1971	Promenade	The sole survivor of the class.
Class DD51	DD51 756	Hitachi	1972	Main hall	

=== Electric locomotives ===
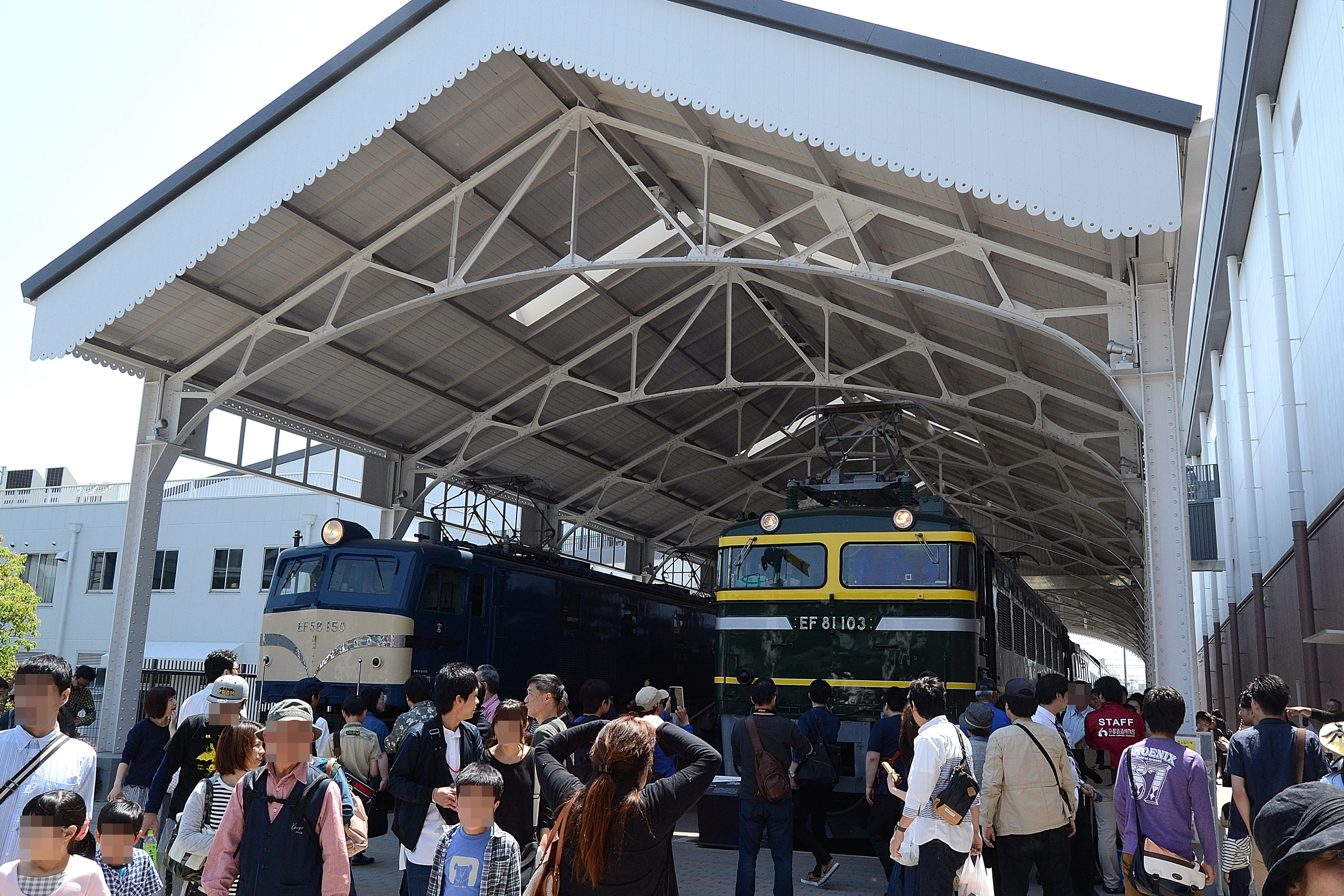
EF58 150 (left) and EF81 103 (right) in the Twilight Plaza zone in May 2016

Type	Number	Manufacturer	Year built	Exhibition area	Remarks
Class EF52	EF52 1	Hitachi	1928	Main hall	Brown livery
Class EF58	EF58 150	Tokyo Shibaura Denki	1958	Twilight Plaza	Blue livery
Class EF65	EF65 1	Kawasaki Sharyo/Kawasaki Denki Seizo	1965	Twilight Plaza	Blue livery
Class EF81	EF81 103	Hitachi	1974	Twilight Plaza	Twilight Express green livery
Class EF66	EF66 35	Toyo Denki/Kawasaki	1974	Main hall	Blue livery

=== Shinkansen ===
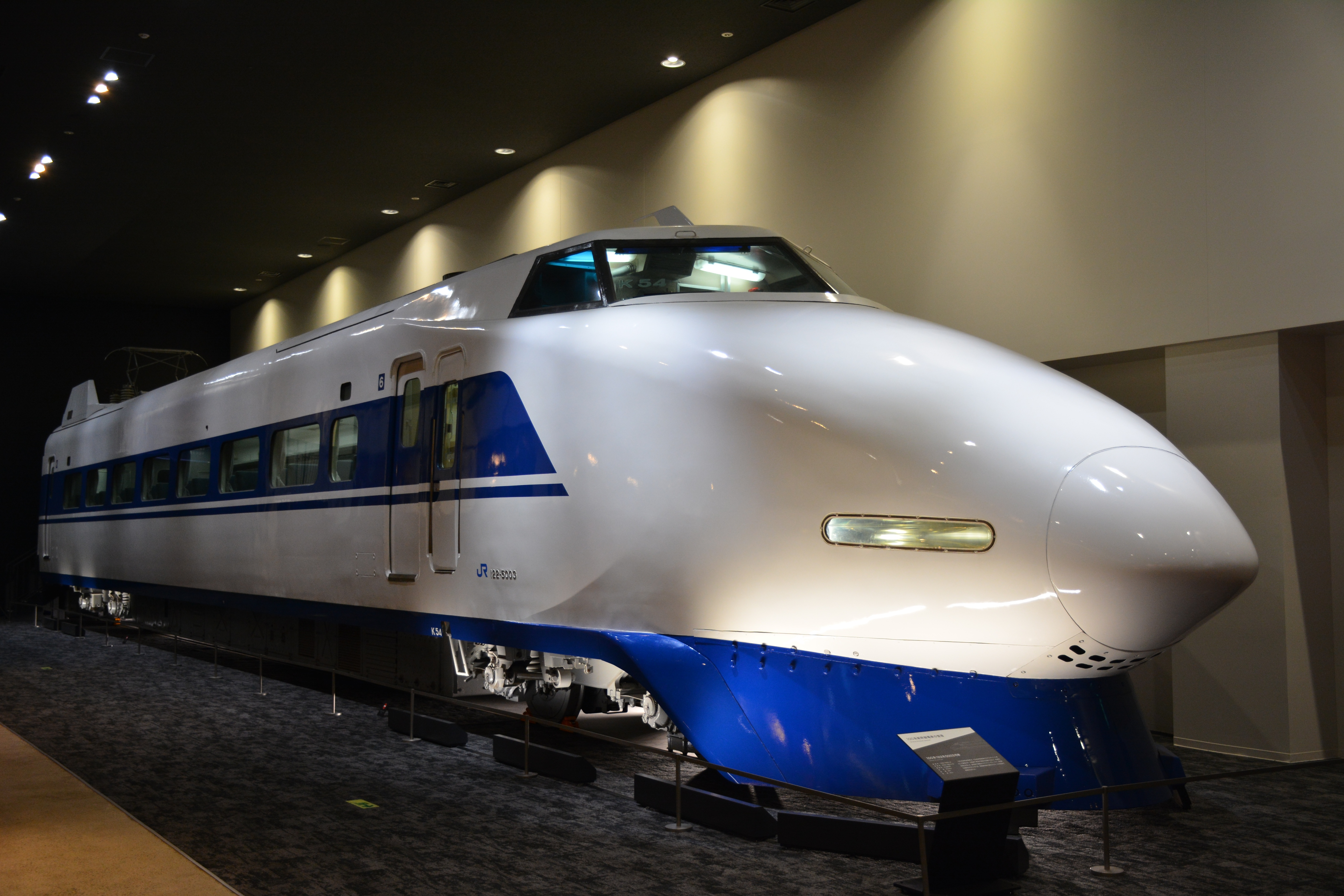
100 series car 122-5003 in the Main hall in October 2016

Type	Number	Manufacturer	Year built	Exhibition area
0 series	21-1	Nippon Sharyo	1964	Promenade
0 series	16-1	Nippon Sharyo	1964	Promenade
0 series	35-1	Nippon Sharyo	1964	Promenade
0 series	22-1	Nippon Sharyo	1964	Promenade
100 series	122-5003	Hitachi	1989	Main hall
500 series	521-1	Kawasaki Heavy Industries	1996	Main hall

=== EMUs ===
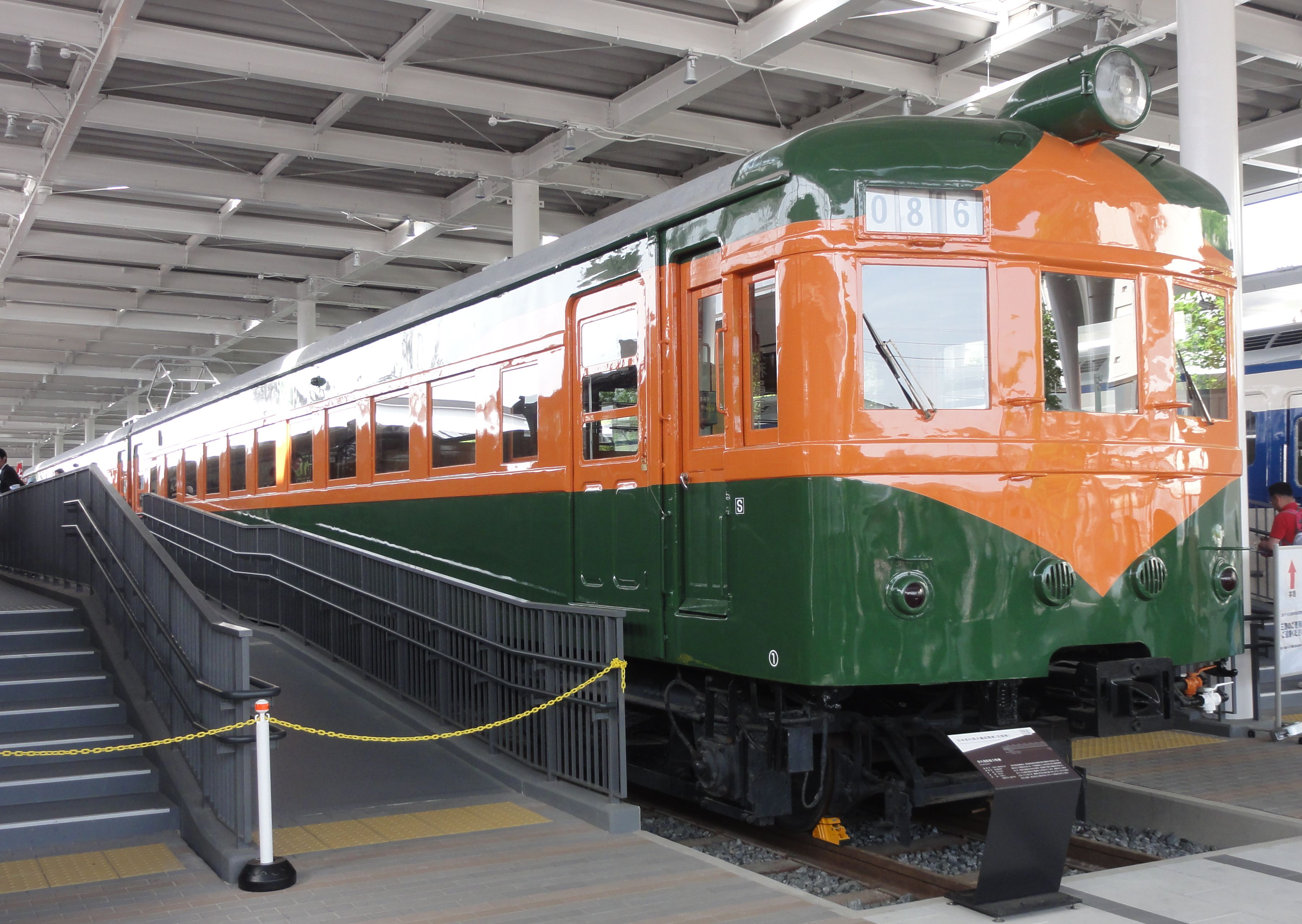
80 series EMU car KuHa 86001 in May 2016

Type	Number	Manufacturer	Year built	Exhibition area	Remarks
80 series	KuHa 86001	Hitachi	1950	Promenade	Orange/green Shonan livery
80 series	MoHa 80001	Hitachi	1950	Promenade	Orange/green Shonan livery
103 series	KuHa 103-1	Nippon Sharyo	1964	Promenade	Vermillion orange livery
581 series	KuHaNe 581-35	Hitachi	1968	Main hall	JNR beige livery
489 series	KuHa 489-1	Tokyu Car	1971	Main hall	JNR beige livery

=== DMUs ===
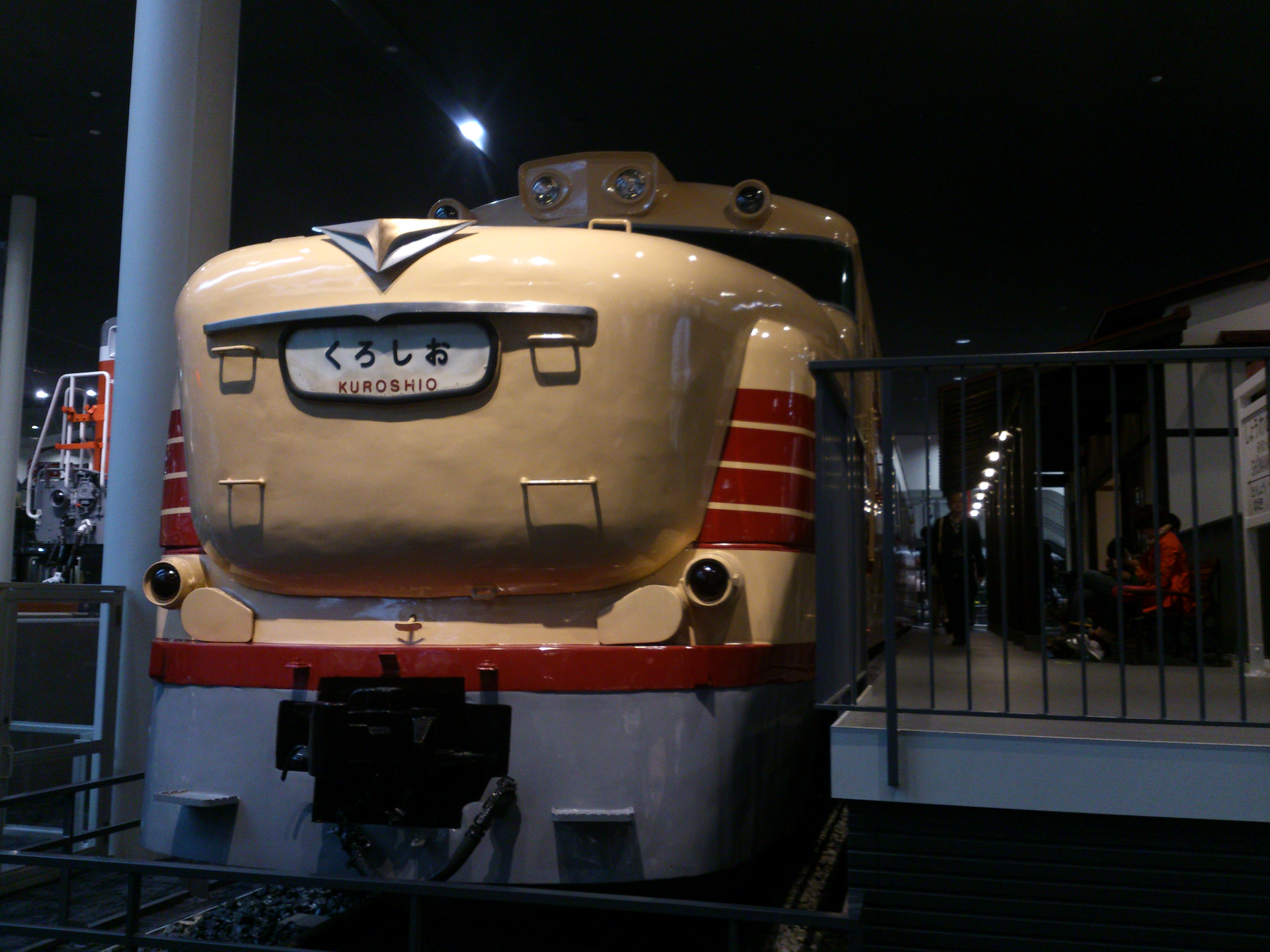
KiHa 81 series DMU car KiHa 81-3 in the Main hall in April 2016

Type	Number	Manufacturer	Year built	Exhibition area	Remarks
KiHa 81 series	KiHa 81-3	Kinki Sharyo	1960	Main hall	JNR beige livery

=== Coaches ===
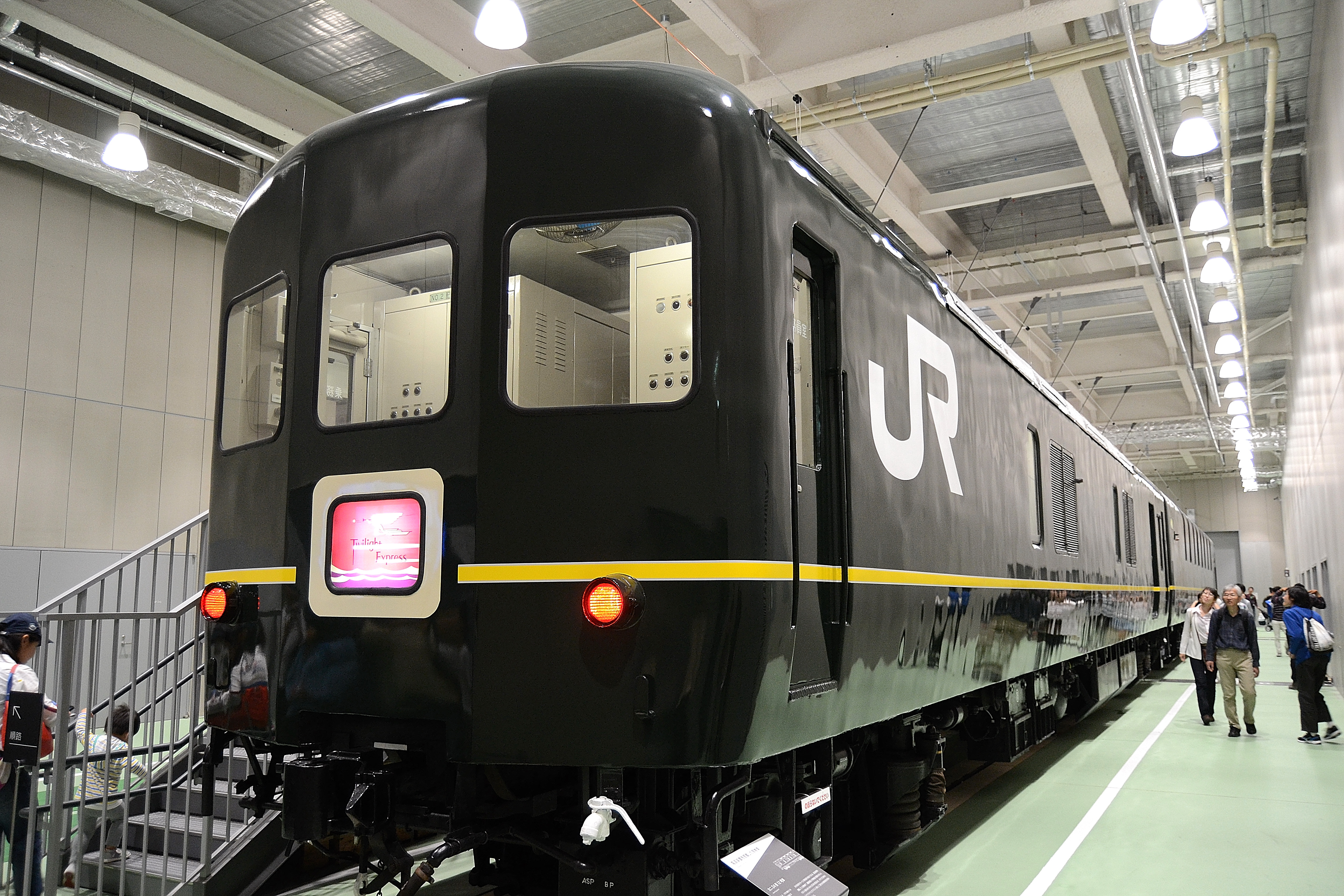
Former Twilight Express generator van KaNi 24-12 and lounge car OHa 25-551 in the Main hall in May 2016

Type	Number	Manufacturer	Year built	Exhibition area	Remarks
SuShi 28	SuShi 28 301	Nippon Sharyo	1933	Promenade	Brown livery
MaRoNeFu 59	MaRoNeFu 59 1	Takatori Factory	1938	Promenade	Brown livery
OHa 46	OHa 46 13	Kisha Seizo	1955	Railway vehicle factory	Brown livery
20 series	NaShi 20 24	Nippon Sharyo	1970	Promenade	Blue livery
24 series	ORoNe 24 4	Nippon Sharyo	1973	Twilight Plaza	Blue livery
50 series	OHaFu 50 68	Niigata Engineering (also known as Niigata Tekko)	1977	Roundhouse	Red livery, used as a resting spot
24 series	SuShi 24-1	Kinki Sharyo	1972	Twilight Plaza	Twilight Express livery
24 series	SuRoNeFu 25-501	Fuji Heavy Industries	1975	Twilight Plaza	Twilight Express livery
24 series	OHa 25-551	Fuji Heavy Industries	1977	Railway vehicle factory	Twilight Express livery
SuHa 32	MaITe 49-2	Ministry of Railways Oi Factory	1938	Railway vehicle factory	Brown livery

=== Freight wagons ===
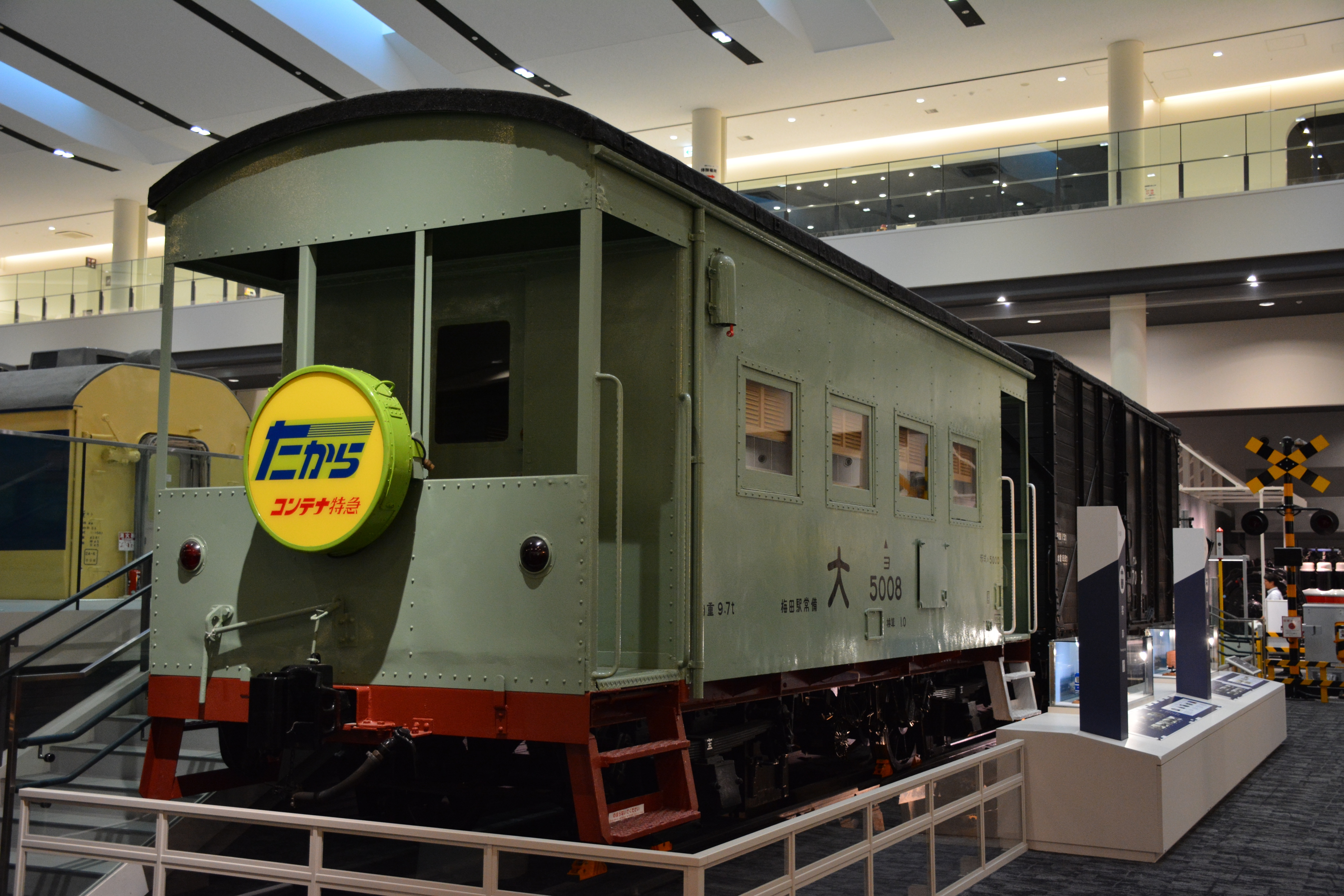
Brake van Yo 5008 in October 2016

Type	Number	Manufacturer	Year built	Exhibition area	Remarks
WaMu 3500	WaMu 3500-7055	Nippon Sharyo	1917	Main hall	Black livery
Yo 5000	Yo 5000-5008	Kawasaki Sharyo	1959	Main hall	Light green livery

== History ==
As early as 1967, plans were being made to turn the round-house at Umekoji depot, Kyoto into a live museum where good-order examples of Japanese steam locomotives could be displayed and also steamed and run. The Opening-eve ceremony was held on October 9, 1972 from 1:00 p.m. At the beginning, JNR president Mr. Isozaki planted a memorial young black pine tree. The opening ceremony was conducted in front of the Symbol-Zone. The ceremony invited the Kyoto prefectural governor, Kyoto city mayor, and successive Umekoji depot directors, and one hundred and thirty other celebrities as well as eighty JNR members. After the JNR president's congratulatory speech, the naming ceremony was done. It was named "The Umekoji Steam Locomotive Museum (Umekoji Jyoki Kikansha Kan)." The dedicated monument embodied the driving wheel from a C57 88 (Retired at 1 May 1972). There is an original English epitaph on the monument, as follows;

May the glory of steam locomotives over the past century be remembered and their gallant sight preserved here forever.
10 October 1972 Japan National Railways.

At the end of the ceremony, a special ceremonial train was run by the C62 2. The museum was opened by Japanese National Railways (JNR) on October 10, 1972 commemorating the centennial of the railway in Japan. When JNR was divided into regional companies in 1987, the museum was inherited by JR West.

=== Expansion plans ===
On 19 December 2012, JR West officially announced its plans to modernize and expand the Umekoji museum. It was announced on 18 December 2013 that the enlarged museum would be renamed the Kyoto Railway Museum. The construction cost was 7.0 billion yen.

Once the expansion was complete, the new museum exhibit space covered 31,000 square meters, becoming the largest railway museum in Japan both in terms of floor space and the number of trains exhibited, and surpassing JR East's Railway Museum in Saitama and JR Central's SCMaglev and Railway Park in Nagoya.

The expansion became necessary due to the aging facilities of the Modern Transportation Museum in Osaka. The MTM closed on 6 April 2014, and the exhibits housed there were subsequently moved to the new railway museum in Kyoto.

== Access ==
The museum is approximately 3 minutes on foot from Umekōji-Kyōtonishi Station.

== See also ==
- JR East Railway Museum, Saitama, Saitama Prefecture
- JR Central SCMaglev and Railway Park, Nagoya, Aichi Prefecture
