= Takao Railway Museum =

Museum in Gushan, Kaohsiung, Taiwan

- 舊打狗驛故事館
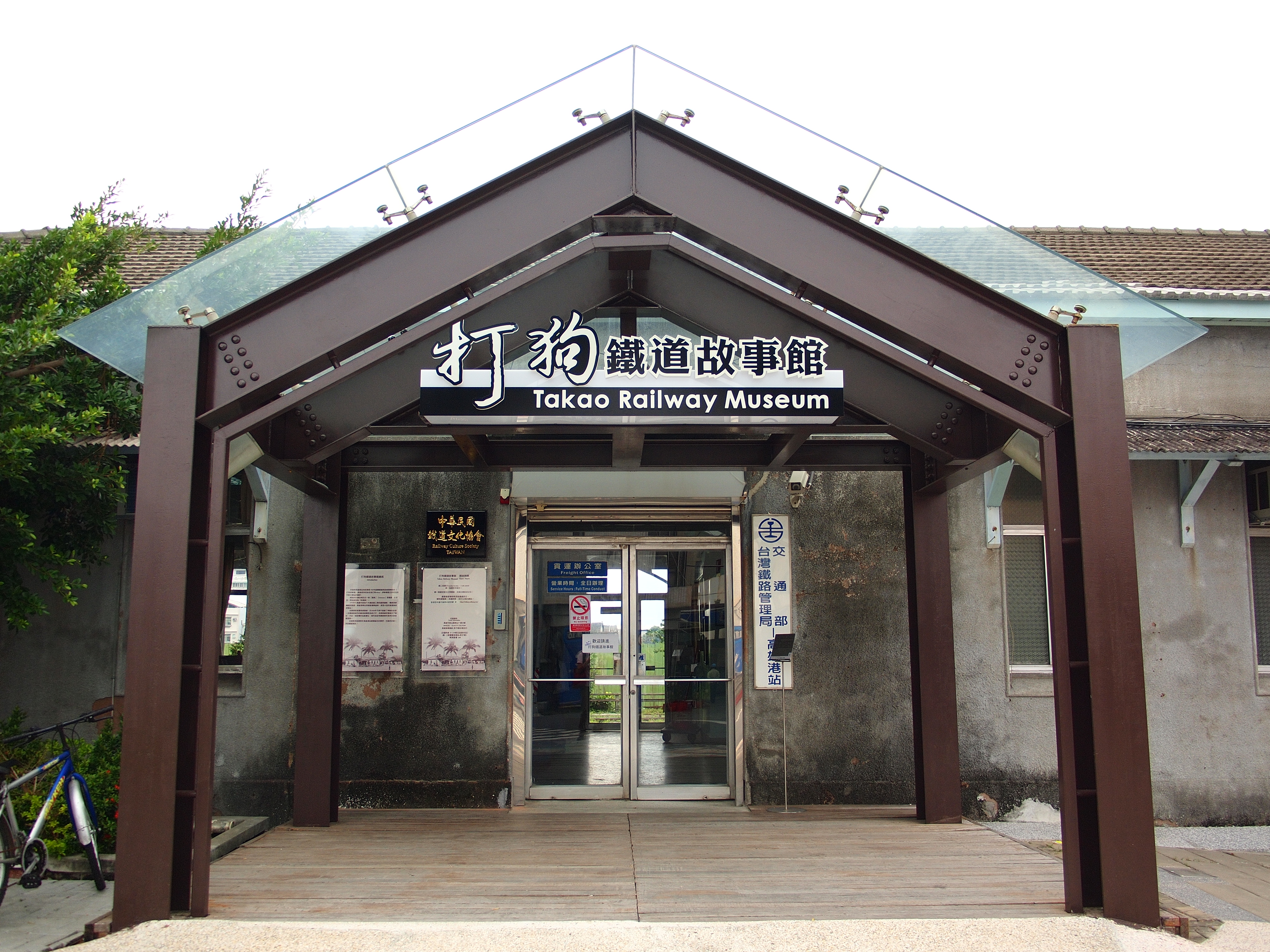
- Former name: Takow Station
- Established: 24 October 2010
- Location: Gushan, Kaohsiung, Taiwan
- Coordinates: 22°37′18″N 120°16′35″E
- Type: railway museum
- Website: Official website

The Takao Railway Museum (traditional Chinese: 舊打狗驛故事館; simplified Chinese: 旧打狗驿故事馆; pinyin: Jiù Dǎ Gǒu Yì Gùshìguǎn) is a museum in Gushan District, Kaohsiung, Taiwan.

== History ==
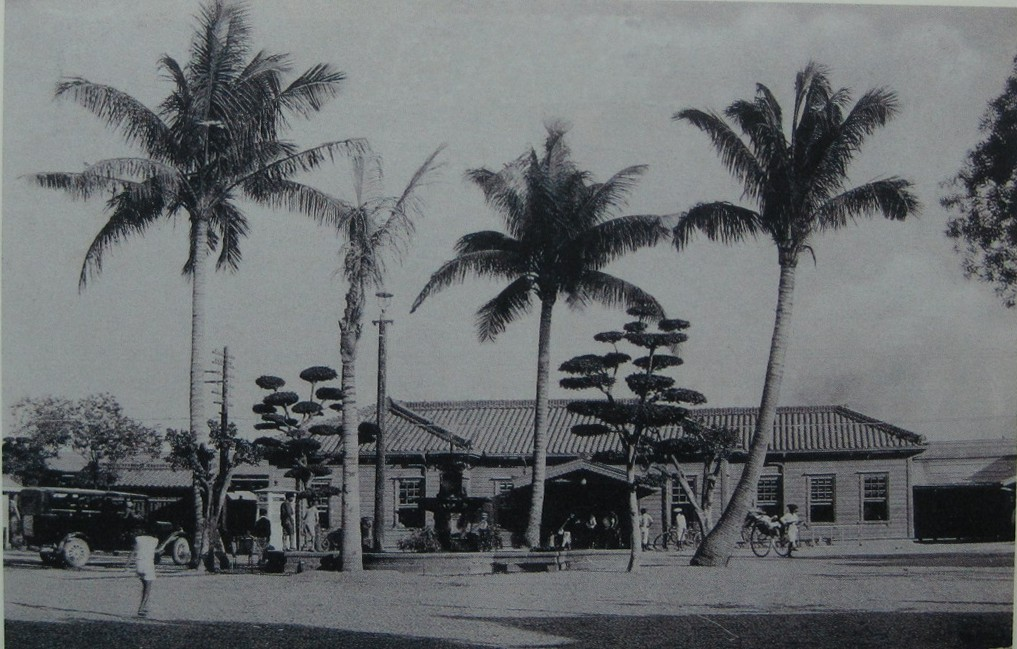
The former Kaohsiung Harbor Station

The museum was formerly the Kaohsiung Harbor Station, built during the Japanese period. Then called the Takow Station (Japanese: 打狗停車場), the station was the first railway station in Kaohsiung. In 2003, the station building was designated a historical building by the Kaohsiung City Government.

On 9 November 2008, the last train departed from the station at 5.30 p.m. After the station closure, the Railway Culture Society managed the station as the Takao Railway Museum. The museum is currently part of the Kaohsiung Museum of History.

== Architecture ==
The museum building was built in a classic Japanese style with a Chinese hip style roof. Area in front of the station was planted in huge coconut trees.

== Exhibition ==
The museum provides books about railroads and exhibitions of relics from the age of rail.

=== Locomotives ===
The following locomotives are on static display outdoors.

● Steam Passenger Locomotive CT259, which is a Pacific-type (4-6-2 Whyte classification) tender locomotive. It was made in Japan circa 1935, during the Japanese colonial period of Taiwan. It is an example of the Japanese National Railway (JNR) Class C55.

● Steam Freight Locomotive DT609, which is a Consolidation-type (2-8-0 Whyte classification) tender locomotive. It was made in Japan circa 1920s, during the Japanese colonial period of Taiwan. It is an example of the Japanese National Railway (JNR) Class 9600.

● Taiwan Power Company (TaiPower) diesel locomotive number L02, previously used at LinKou Power Station.

● Taiwan Power Company (TaiPower) diesel locomotive number L03.

== Transportation ==
The museum is accessible within walking distance east from Sizihwan Station of the Kaohsiung MRT Orange Line.

== See also ==
- List of museums in Taiwan
