= JNR Class C59 =

Class of 173 Japanese 4-6-2 locomotives

Class C59
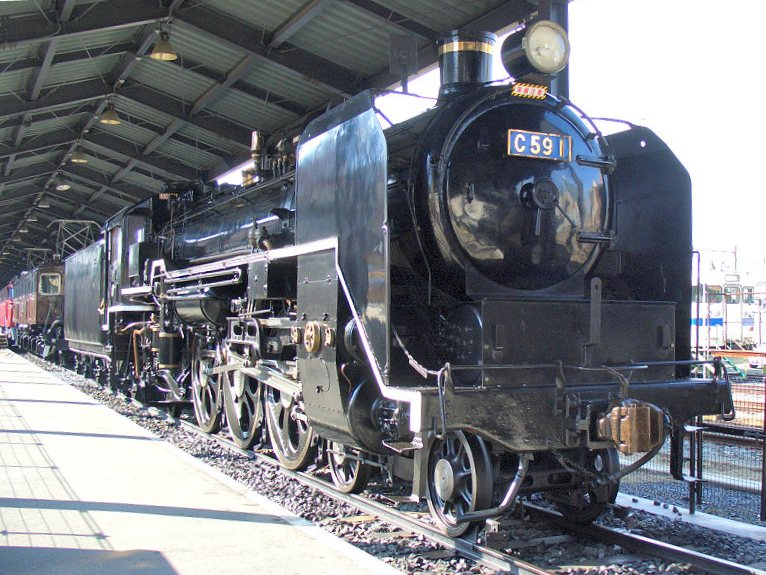
- C59 1 preserved at Kyushu Railway History Museum
Type and origin
- Power type: Steam
- Builder: Kisha Seizō, Kawasaki Heavy Industries Rolling Stock Company, Hitachi
- Build date: 1941-1947
- Total produced: 173
- Rebuild date: 1953-1961
- Number rebuilt: 47 (to Class C60)
Specifications
- Configuration
  - Whyte: 4-6-2 Pacific 47 (Rebuilt to Class C60 4-6-4 Hudson Rebuild)
- Gauge: 1,067 mm (3 ft 6 in)
- Leading dia.: 860 mm (2 ft 10 in)
- Driver dia.: 1,750 mm (5 ft 9 in)
- Trailing dia.: 860 mm (2 ft 10 in)
- Wheelbase: 10.02 m (32 ft 10 in)
- Length: 21.575 m (70 ft 9.4 in)
- Axle load: Prewar: 16.17 t (15.91 long tons; 17.82 short tons); Postwar: 16.04 t (15.79 long tons; 17.68 short tons)
- Loco weight: 79.75 t (78.49 long tons; 87.91 short tons)
- Total weight: 134.63 t (132.50 long tons; 148.40 short tons)
- Fuel type: Coal
- Fuel capacity: 10 t (9.8 long tons; 11 short tons)
- Water cap.: 25 m^{3} (6,604 US gal)
- Firebox
  - Grate area: 3.27 m^{2} (35 sq ft)
- Boiler pressure: 16 kg/cm^{2} (230 lbf/in^{2})
- Heating surface: 136.8 m^{2} (1,473 sq ft)
- Superheater
  - Heating area: 80.9 m^{2} (871 sq ft)
- Cylinders: Two
- Cylinder size: 52 cm × 66 cm (20 in × 26 in)
- Valve gear: Walschaerts
Performance figures
- Maximum speed: 100 km/h (62 mph)
- Tractive effort: 13,860 kg (30,560 lb)
Career
- Numbers: C59 1-C59 172 later renumbered C59 1-C59 132, C59 156-C59 196
- Retired: 1970
- Disposition: Three (C59 1, C59 161, and C59 164) preserved; remainder scrapped

The Class C59 is a type of 4-6-2 steam locomotive designed by Hideo Shima and built by Japanese National Railways. The C classification indicates three sets of driving wheels. The C59 could haul 17 passenger cars. World War II limited their use as express trains, a function for which they were designed. C59s were transferred to Kyushu after electrification of the trunk lines after the war. 47 were rebuilt into Class C60 Hudsons between 1953 and 1961 at the railway's Hamamatsu works and Koriyama works. In 1970, the locomotives were retired. Only three are preserved. C59 1 is preserved at the Kyushu Railway History Museum on display. C59 164 is preserved at the Kyoto Railway Museum. C59 161 is preserved at the Hiroshima Children’s Museum.

== Basis and years of service ==
The Class C59 where based on the earlier designs of the Railway such as the JNR Class C55 and the JNR Class C57 Pacifics that built in the 1930’s and early 40’s. The C59’s were built between 1941 and 1947 but only 173 C59’s were built during and after World War II. Between 1953 and 1961 47 Locomotives were rebuilt into the Class C60 Hudson’s. The remaining 126 C59 Pacific’s remained in service until 1970 when they were all scrapped except for 3 surviving C59’s that are preserved in Japan Post WWII. 46 of the rebuilt Class C60’s were scrapped by 1971 except for one Class C60 surviving in preservation.

== See also ==
- Japan Railways locomotive numbering and classification
- JNR Class C60
- JNR Class C61
- JNR Class C62
