= British Antique Museum Kamakura =

Museum in Kamakura, Kanagawa, Japan

British Antique Museum BAM Kamakura
- 英国アンティーク博物館 BAM鎌倉
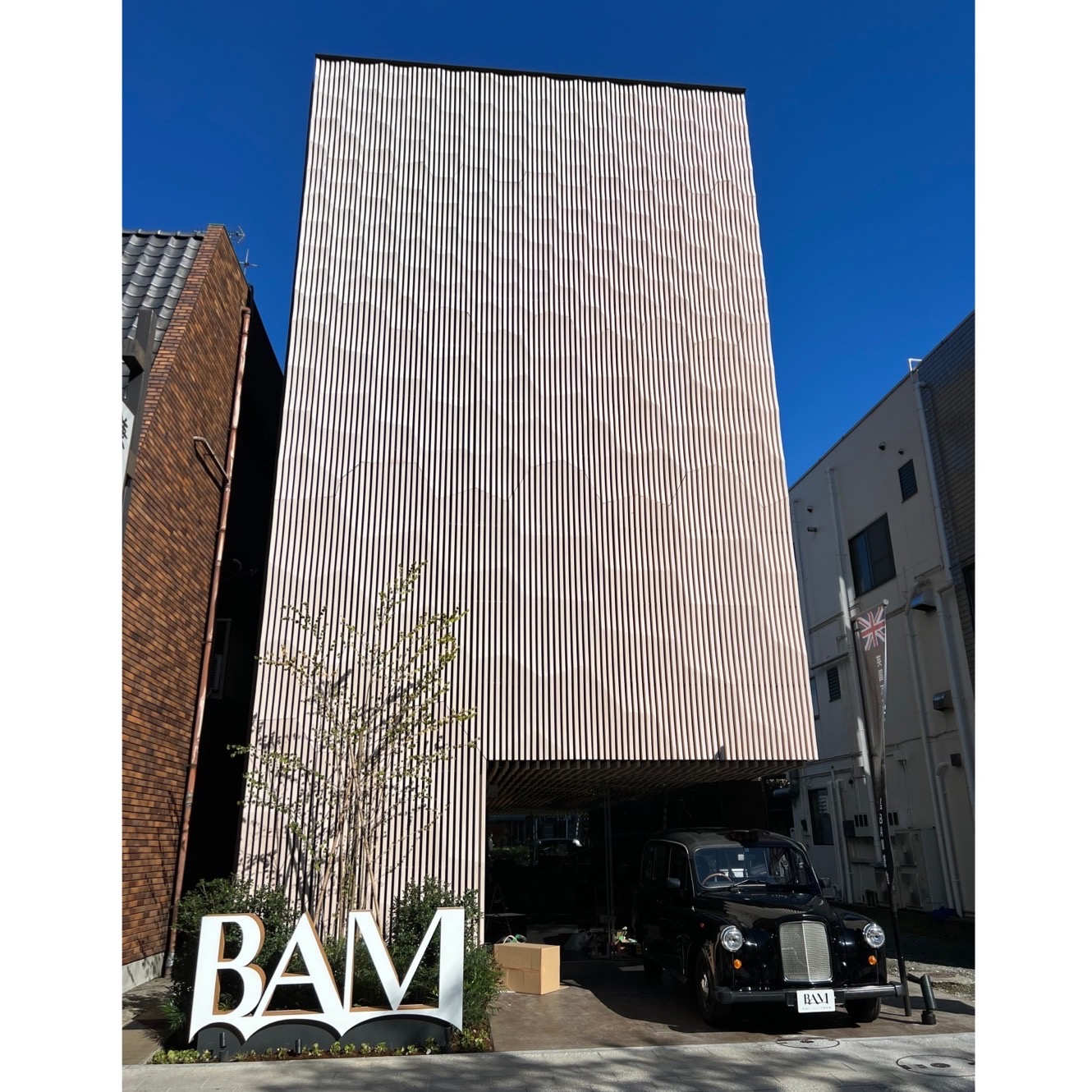

General information
- Location: 1-11-4-1 Yukinoshita, Kamakura, Kanagawa Prefecture, Japan
- Coordinates: 35°19′21″N 139°33′16″E
- Opened: 23 September 2022

Technical details
- Floor count: 4

Design and construction
- Architects: Kengo Kuma & Associates

Website
- Official website

British Antique Museum BAM Kamakura (英国アンティーク博物館 BAM鎌倉, Eikoku Antīku Hakubutsukan BAM Kamakura) opened in Kamakura, Kanagawa Prefecture, Japan, in 2022. Located along Wakamiya Ōji on the approach to Tsurugaoka Hachimangū, the museum building along with its fourth-floor tea room was designed by Kengo Kuma, with a windowless façade inspired by the local craft of Kamakura-bori woodcarving, executed in Japanese cypress with a CNC cutter, with incisions that gradually reduce in scale for perspective effect and to blend with the sky.

The museum displays antiques from the collection of founder-director Dobashi Masaomi [ja], with a Georgian Room, a Victorian Room, and a Sherlock Holmes Room. The tea room incorporates in its walls wooden members from a Hōjō residence excavated on the site where the museum now stands, together with a floor of oak from English manor houses, and hanging scroll-style windows with views of the forested hillside behind the shrine, saved from development in the 1960s by the National Trust-inspired efforts of Osaragi Jirō and others that would lead to the establishment of the Japan National Trust.

== See also ==
- Kamakura Museum of National Treasures
- Kamakura Museum of Literature
- Sherlock Holmes Museum
