= 160 class =

160 class or Class 160 may refer to:

- JGR Class 160, 2-4-0 steam locomotives
- Manila Railroad 160 class, 2-6-0+0-6-2 steam locomotives
