= JNR Class C61 =

Class of Japanese 4-6-4 locomotives

Class C61
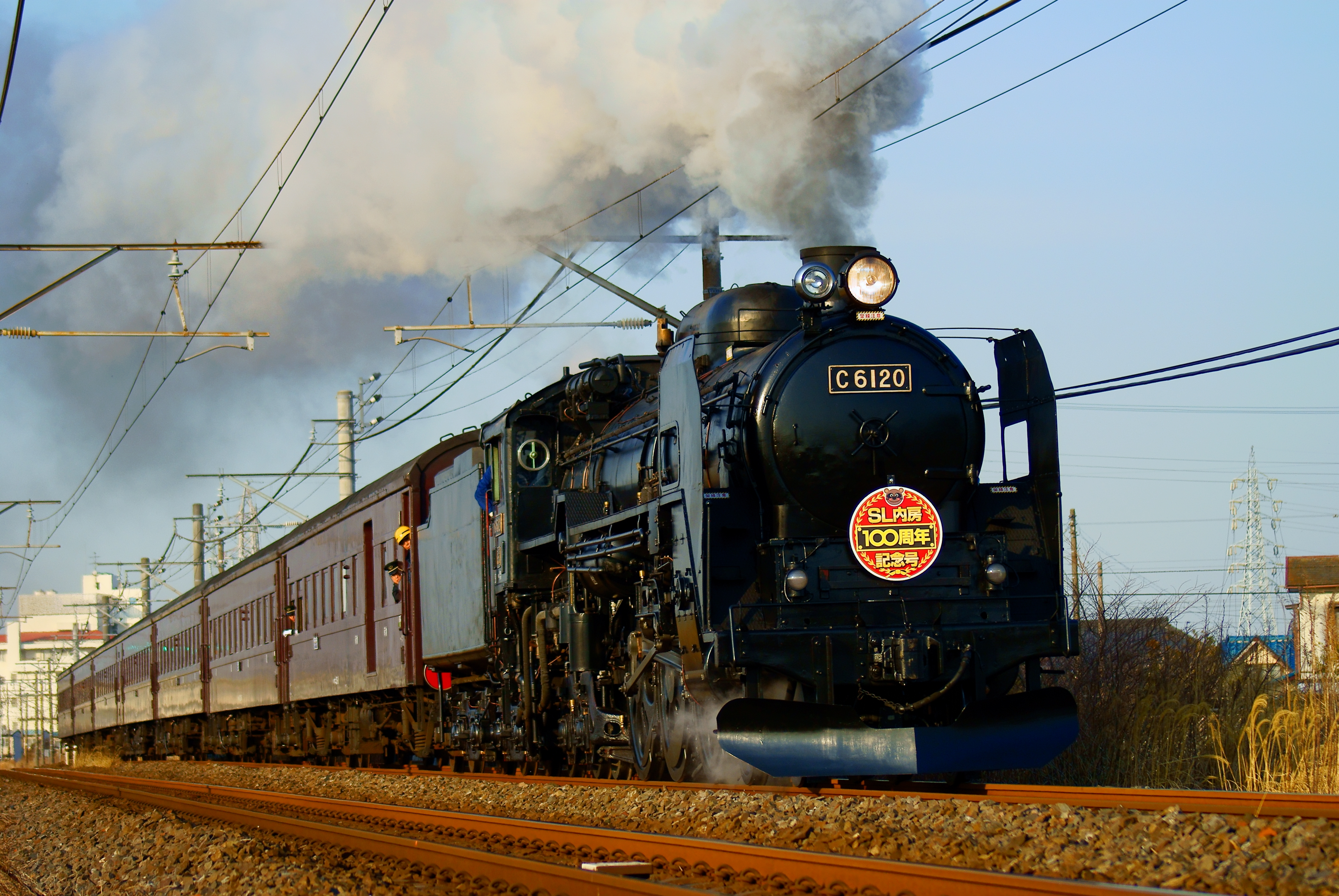
- C61 20 hauling an excursion train in 2011
Type and origin
- Power type: Steam
- Builder: Mitsubishi Heavy Industries, Nippon Sharyo (Rebuilder)
- Rebuild date: 1947-1949
- Number rebuilt: 33
Specifications
- Configuration
  - Whyte: 4-6-4 Hudson
- Gauge: 1,067 mm
- Length: 20,375 mm (66 ft 10.2 in)
- Height: 3,980 mm (13 ft 1 in)
- Loco weight: 78.10 t (76.87 long tons; 86.09 short tons)
- Boiler pressure: 15 kgf/cm^{2} (210 psi)
- Cylinders: Two, outside
- Cylinder size: 500 mm × 660 mm (20 in × 26 in)
Performance figures
- Maximum speed: 100 km/h (62 mph)
Career
- Numbers: C61 1-C61 33
- Locale: Tohoku, Kanto, Kyushu
- Retired: 1966-1974
- Disposition: Two operational among four preserved, remainder scrapped in 1974

The Class C61 (C61形) is a class of steam locomotives formerly operated in Japan. The class was the first type in Japan to use the 4-6-4 "Hudson" wheel arrangement and was designed by Hideo Shima. A total of 33 locomotives in the class were built between 1947 and 1949 (one in 1947, 19 in 1948, and 13 in 1949). The locomotives were not built entirely from scratch, however, but used boilers from former D51 2-8-2 "Mikado" freight locomotives.

== History ==
The immediate post-war years saw a dramatic decline in freight, while at the same time passenger traffic once again surged, requiring a programme to rapidly build new passenger locos (classes C57 and C58) as well as rebuilding passenger locos from former freight types (classes C61 and C62). These nominal conversions were also seen as a way of bypassing the difficulties in obtaining approval from GHQ (General Headquarters, or Supreme Commander for the Allied Powers) for building completely new locomotives at the time.

The locomotives were notable in being the first in Japan to incorporate automatic stokers. The first eighteen locos delivered were allocated to Utsunomiya and Sendai depots to work express passenger duties on the Tōhoku Main Line. Nine locos were allocated to Oku and Mito depots to work on Jōban Line duties, and six locos were delivered to Tosu depot in Kyūshū to work on the Kagoshima Main Line. With the spread of electrification together with the influx of C59s displaced from Tōkaidō Main Line duties, the C61s found themselves gradually pushed further north to Morioka and Aomori depots. In later years, they were to be seen at the head of the newly inaugurated Hakutsuru limited express (between Sendai and Aomori) and the Hayabusa blue train (between Hakata and Kagoshima). With the completion of electrification from Morioka to Aomori in October 1968, the six last remaining C61s were moved to Aomori depot where they worked on the Ōu Main Line between Akita and Aomori. The six Kagoshima-based locos originally delivered new to Kyūshū were withdrawn, but the six remaining Tōhoku locos were transferred to Miyazaki depot in October 1971 to work on the Nippō Main Line between Miyazaki and Kagoshima. They worked there until finally being withdrawn in 1974.

== Specifications ==
Overall length	20,375 mm
Overall height	3,980 mm
Driving wheel diameter	1,750 mm
Total operating weight	78.10 t (excluding tender)
Boiler capacity	7.4 m3
Boiler pressure	15.0 kgf/cm²
Cylinder dimensions	500 mm dia. x 660 mm stroke

== Fleet details ==
(Source:)

Number	Boiler from	Rebuilt by	Date rebuilt	Date withdrawn	Last depot allocation
C61 1	D51 615	Mitsubishi Heavy Industries	30 Nov 1947	5 Aug 1966	Sendai
C61 2	D51 1109	Mitsubishi Heavy Industries	31 Jul 1948	3 Oct 1969	Sendai
C61 3	D51 1063	Mitsubishi Heavy Industries	22 Aug 1948	31 Mar 1966	Sendai
C61 4	D51 1011	Mitsubishi Heavy Industries	31 Aug 1948	25 Dec 1967	Sendai
C61 5	D51 1075	Mitsubishi Heavy Industries	29 Sep 1948	31 Mar 1966	Sendai
C61 6	D51 1134	Mitsubishi Heavy Industries	18 Oct 1948	13 Mar 1969	Aomori
C61 7	D51 1147	Mitsubishi Heavy Industries	30 Oct 1948	10 Jan 1968	Aomori
C61 8	D51 1117	Mitsubishi Heavy Industries	16 Nov 1948	31 Mar 1966	Sendai
C61 9	D51 925	Mitsubishi Heavy Industries	29 Nov 1948	20 Aug 1968	Aomori
C61 10	D51 1047	Mitsubishi Heavy Industries	14 Dec 1948	31 Mar 1966	Sendai
C61 11	D51 1139	Mitsubishi Heavy Industries	5 Jan 1949	1 Oct 1968	Aomori
C61 12	D51 1143	Mitsubishi Heavy Industries	28 Feb 1949	19 Dec 1970	Kagoshima
C61 13	D51 1115	Mitsubishi Heavy Industries	19 Mar 1949	19 Dec 1970	Kagoshima
C61 14	D51 1124	Mitsubishi Heavy Industries	31 Mar 1949	19 Dec 1970	Kagoshima
C61 15	D51 1084	Mitsubishi Heavy Industries	27 Apr 1949	25 Dec 1967	Sendai
C61 16	D51 1128	Mitsubishi Heavy Industries	19 May 1949	10 Oct 1968	Aomori
C61 17	D51 1130	Mitsubishi Heavy Industries	31 May 1949	5 Aug 1966	Sendai
C61 18	D51 874	Mitsubishi Heavy Industries	19 Jun 1949	18 Jan 1974	Miyazaki
C61 19	D51 1027	Mitsubishi Heavy Industries	28 Jul 1949	18 Nov 1973	Miyazaki
C61 20	D51 1094	Mitsubishi Heavy Industries	31 Jul 1949	18 Nov 1973	Miyazaki
C61 21	D51 1123	Mitsubishi Heavy Industries	31 Aug 1949	25 Dec 1967	Taira
C61 22	D51 1158	Nippon Sharyo	25 Sep 1948	10 Oct 1968	Aomori
C61 23	D51 1010	Nippon Sharyo	30 Sep 1948	5 Aug 1966	Sendai
C61 24	D51 1135	Nippon Sharyo	4 Oct 1948	7 Nov 1972	Miyazaki
C61 25	D51 366	Nippon Sharyo	8 Oct 1948	31 Mar 1966	Sendai
C61 26	D51 198	Nippon Sharyo	28 Oct 1948	31 Mar 1966	Sendai
C61 27	D51 1146	Nippon Sharyo	31 Oct 1948	31 Mar 1966	Sendai
C61 28	D51 904	Nippon Sharyo	25 Nov 1948	20 Aug 1973	Miyazaki
C61 29	D51 69	Nippon Sharyo	29 Nov 1948	20 Aug 1973	Aomori
C61 30	D51 1144	Nippon Sharyo	11 Dec 1948	11 Dec 1968	Aomori
C61 31	D51 945	Nippon Sharyo	22 Dec 1948	19 Dec 1970	Kagoshima
C61 32	D51 1050	Nippon Sharyo	31 Jan 1949	19 Dec 1970	Kagoshima
C61 33	D51 1148	Nippon Sharyo	2 Mar 1949	19 Dec 1970	Kagoshima

== Preserved examples ==
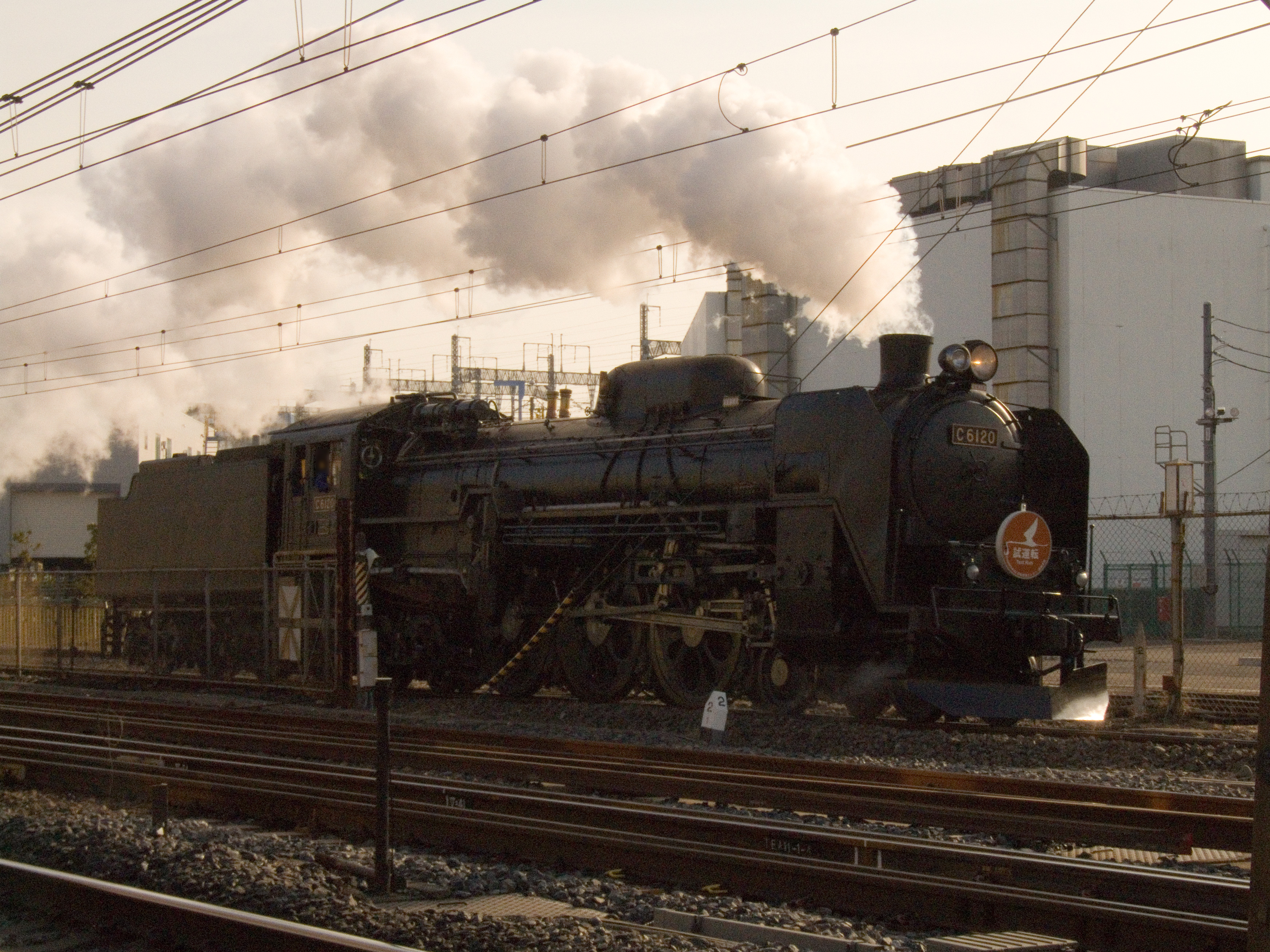
C61 20 (Feb. 2011)

- C61 2 (formerly D51 1109) - Umekōji Steam Locomotive Museum in Kyoto (in working condition)
- C61 18 (formerly D51 874) - Front section only preserved privately in Yatsushiro, Kumamoto
- C61 19 (formerly D51 1027) - Shiroyama Park in Kokubu, Kagoshima
- C61 20 (formerly D51 1094) - JR-East Takasaki, Gunma (Operating condition - April 2011)

== See also ==
- Japan Railways locomotive numbering and classification
- List of operational steam locomotives in Japan
- JNR Class C60
- JNR Class C62
