= List of operational steam locomotives in Japan =

This is a list of preserved Japanese steam locomotives in working condition. The list includes mainline-operational locomotives, those operated on short dedicated tracks within museum premises, and locomotives awaiting overhaul to return to mainline service.

== JGR/JNR standard locomotives ==
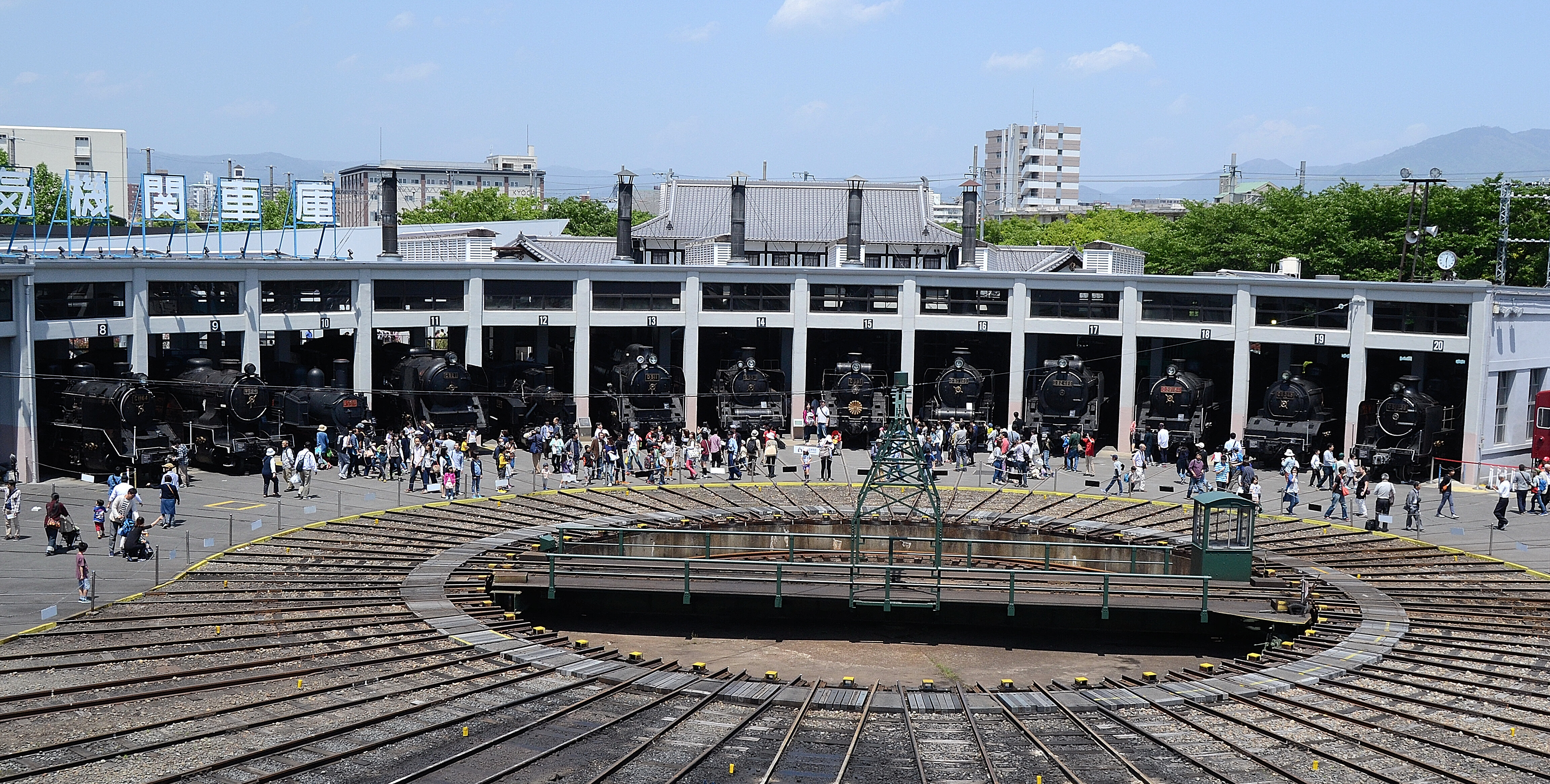
Eight operational steam locomotives are based at the 1914-built roundhouse of the Kyoto Railway Museum, with twelve other locomotives on static display.

Most preserved JNR standard locomotives in working condition can be divided into two groups: those preserved at the Kyoto Railway Museum and those formerly preserved elsewhere but restored by railway companies from the 1980s onwards. The Kyoto Railway Museum, originally known as the Umekoji Steam Locomotive Museum, was established by the Japanese National Railways in 1972 to preserve steam locomotives in operational condition. While more than 10 of the 17 locomotives in its collection were operational when it was established, this number has dwindled to 8 by 2024. Apart from B20 10 and 7105, these locomotives have remained in working condition since they were built and include the only C62 locomotive in operational condition, the largest and fastest in Japanese rail history. The museum is now owned by JR West, and two of the eight operational locomotives, C57 1 and D51 200, also haul tourist trains on the Yamaguchi Lines. The latter group mainly comprises small to midsize locomotives, such as the C11, C12, C58, and C56, although JR East has restored larger locomotives such as the C61, D51, and C57.

Type	Number	Builder	Year built	Operator	Status	Image	Notes
Class 160	12 (originally called 23, later 165)	Sharp, Stewart and Company	1874	Meiji-mura	Limited operationality		The locomotive is the sole surviving example of the class.
Class 7100	7105 Yoshitsune	H.K. Porter, Inc.	1880?	JR West	Limited operationality		Preserved at the Kyoto Railway Museum
Class 2100	2109	Dübs & Co.	1890	Nippon Institute of Technology	Limited operationality		The locomotive is the sole surviving example of the class.
Class 8620	8630	Kisha Kaisha	1914	JR West	Limited operationality		The locomotive has remained in working condition ever since it was built. It has been primarily operating on an 800-metre track within the grounds of the Kyoto Railway Museum since the 1970s.
Class C10	C10 8	Kawasaki	1930	Oigawa Railway	Mainline operational		The locomotive is the sole surviving example of the class. The locomotive has operated on the Oigawa Line since 1997.
Class C12	C12 66	Hitachi	1933	Mooka Railway	Mainline operational		The locomotive was restored in 1994.
Class C56	C56 44	Mitsubishi	1936	Oigawa Railway	Awaiting overhaul		The locomotive was built for use in Hokkaido, sent to Burma during the war, brought back to Japan by railfans in 1979 and has been operating on the line since 1980. Taken out of service in 2019 and awaiting overhaul.
Class C57	C57 1	Kawasaki	1937	JR West	Mainline operational		The locomotive has remained in working condition ever since it was built. Based at the Kyoto Railway Museum, it hauls the SL Yamaguchi service on the Yamaguchi Line together with D51 200.
Class C12	C12 164	Nippon Sharyo	1937	Oigawa Railway and the Japan National Trust	Awaiting overhaul		The locomotive is owned by the Japan National Trust. The CEO of Oigawa Railway wrote in August 2024 that he wanted to restore the locomotive to working condition in about two years.
Class D51	D51 200	JGR Hamamatsu Works	1938	JR West	Mainline operational		The locomotive has remained in working condition ever since it was built. Based at the Kyoto Railway Museum, it hauls the SL Yamaguchi service on the Yamaguchi Line together with C57 1.
Class C56	C56 135	Hitachi	1938	Oigawa Railway	Undergoing restoration		The locomotive was withdrawn in 1975 and preserved in Kato, Hyogo. It was purchased by the Oigawa Railway in 2022 and has been undergoing restoration since.
Class C56	C56 160	Kawasaki	1939	JR West	Limited operationality		The locomotive was withdrawn from mainline services in 2018 and has since been operating on the 800-metre track within the grounds of the Kyoto Railway Museum.
Class C58	C58 239	Kawasaki	1940	JR East	Mainline operational		The locomotive was restored in 2012. Its scheduled service ended in 2023 due to the retirement of carriages based at Morioka depot.
Class D51	D51 498	JGR Takatori Works	1940	JR East	Mainline operational		The locomotive was estored in 1988.
Class C11	C11 171	Kawasaki	1940	JR Hokkaido	Mainline operational		The locomotive never left Hokkaido during its operational life. Restored to haul excursion trains by JR Hokkaido in 1999.
Class C11	C11 190	Kawasaki	1940	Oigawa Railway	Mainline operational		The locomotive was withdrawn from service in 1974 and preserved in a private collection until 2001. Restoration works completed in 2003 and the locomotive has operated on the line since then.
Class C11	C11 207	Hitachi	1941	Tobu Railway	Mainline operational		The locomotive never left Hokkaido during its operational life. Restored to haul excursion trains by JR Hokkaido in 2000 and remained in operation until 2014. Since 2016, it has been leased to Tobu Railways.
Class C11	C11 227	Nippon Sharyo	1942	Oigawa Railway	Awaiting overhaul		The locomotive was the first steam locomotive to be regularly operated for heritage purposes in Japan. It has been awaiting overhaul since 2021.
Class C58	C58 363	Kawasaki	1944	Chichibu Railway	Mainline operational		The locomotive was restored in 1987.
Class B20	B20 10	Tateyama	1946	JR West	Limited operationality		Used as a switcher at the Kyoto Railway Museum
Class C11	C11 325	Nippon Sharyo	1946	Tobu Railway	Mainline operational		The locomotive was restored by Mooka Railway in 1998 and operated on the line until 2020. It entered the Tobu service in the same year.
Class C57	C57 180	Mitsubishi	1946	JR East	Mainline operational		The locomotive was restored to haul the Banetsu Monogatari service in between Niigata and Aizu-wakamatsu in 1999.
Class C11	C11 123	Nippon Sharyo	1947	Tobu Railway	Mainline operational		The locomotive was originally built for a private railway in Shiga as C11 1, used on Yubetsu Coal Mine Line in Hokkaido, preserved as part of a private collection until 2018. It was purchased by Tobu in 2018 and restoration completed in 2022. The number was changed to C11 123 when it entered the Tobu service.
Class C62	C62 2	Hitachi	1948	JR West	Limited operationality		Nicknamed the Swallow Angel, the locomotive was one of the most popular ones in Japan in the 1970s. Due to its size, it has not operated on main lines since the 1970s, and has been primarily operating on an 800-metre track within the grounds of the Kyoto Railway Museum.
Class C61	C61 2	Mitsubishi	1948	JR West	Limited operationality		The locomotive has remained in working condition ever since it was built. It has been primarily operating on an 800-metre track within the grounds of the Kyoto Railway Museum since the 1970s.
Class C61	C61 20	Mitsubishi	1949	JR West	Mainline operational		The locomotive was restored to working condition in 2011. It is based at Takasaki together with D51 498.

=== Locomotives converted to run on compressed air ===
Since the early 2000s, multiple locomotives on display have been converted to run on compressed air instead of steam. These locomotives typically operate on short tracks. This method has been popular with small municipalities that want to create a tourist attraction but cannot afford to pay for the restoration and maintenance of boilers.

Type	Number	Builder	Year built	Operator	Image	Notes
Class 9600	49671	Kawasaki	1920	Mooka Railway		location: Mooka Station
Class D51	D51 146	Nippon Sharyo	1938	Mooka Railway		location:Mooka Station
Class D52	D52 70	Kawasaki	1944	Yamakita Town, railfans		location: Yamakita Railway Park, Yamakita, Kanagawa
Class D51	D51 827	JGR Hamamatsu Works	1943	Echigo Tokimeki Railway		location:Naoetsu Railpark, Naoetsu Station (formerly Naoetsu depot)
Class C12	C12 167	Nippon Sharyo	1938	Wakasa Railway		location: Wakasa Station Preserved alongside a DD16 diesel locomotive and 12 Series carriages, MP from the Kyoto 2nd district, Seiji Maehara, drove this locomotive in an NTV programme in 2019. Future prime minister Shigeru Ishiba chose to drive the DD16 in the same programme.
Class C12	C12 244	Hitachi	1940	Akechi Railway		location: Akechi Station The City of Ena has established a committee to conduct a feasibility study on restoring the locomotive, along with another C12 locomotive preserved in the city, to mainline operational condition powered by steam by the time the Chuo Shinkansen opens. The committee concluded in November 2024 that the project would be viable.
Class 8620	58654	Hitachi	1922	Hitoyoshi Station, JR Kyushu		The locomotive was restored into a fully operational state in 1988. It was first withdrawn in 2005 but underwent a thorough overhaul and returned to service in 2009 as the SL Hitoyoshi. The locomotive was retired once again in March 2024. At the time of its retirement, it was the oldest mainline-operational locomotive in Japan. 58654 has been on static display in front of Hitoyoshi Station since November 18, 2024. Since 16 November 2025, 58654 has been operable on a short stretch of track using compressed air.

=== Formerly operational preserved locomotives ===
Type	Number	Builder	Built	Operator	Withdrawn	Image	Note
Class C58	C58 1	Kisha seizo	1938	JNR	1984		The locomotive mainly operated on the Yamaguchi Line along with C57 1. This role was succeeded by C56 160. The locomotive is preserved at the Kyoto Railway Museum.
Class C62	C62 3	Hitachi	1949	JR Hokkaido	1995		The locomotive returned to service in 1988. As the largest locomotive in Japanese rail history, its operation was funded by multiple corporate sponsors. However, with the onset of the Lost Decades in the 1990s, those companies could no longer support the cost of maintenance. The locomotive was withdrawn once again in 1995 and has since been preserved at the Naebo Works of JR Hokkaido.
Class C11	C11 312	Nippon Sharyo	1946	Oigawa Railway	2007		The locomotive was restored in 1988 but withdrawn in 2007 due to the deteriorating condition of its frame. It was cannibalised for parts to support other C11 locomotives operated by the company but later restored for display at a shopping centre attached to Kadode Station on the line.

== Non-JNR locomotives ==
Number/name	Gauge	Year built	Builder	Original operator	Current operator	Image	Note
Northern Rock II	381mm	1989	Ravenglass and Eskdale Railway	Shuzenji Romney Railway			
Cumbria	381mm	1992	Ravenglass and Eskdale Railway	Shuzenji Romney Railway			
Amemiya 21	762mm	1928	Amemiya	Forestry Agency	Hokkaido Maruseppu Recreation Forest Park Railway		Built for Murii Forest Railway, it was withdrawn in 1957. It was given to Maruseppu town in 1976 and was restored to operate on a heritage railway to commemorate the town's wood industry the following year.
S-304	1,067mm	1932	Nippon Sharyo	Muroran Works, Nippon Steel	Mikasa Railway Village, Mikasa city		Built for Muroran Works of Nippon Steel, it operates on the former track of the Horonai Line.
No. 9	1,067mm	1912	Baldwin Locomotive Works	Fuji-Minobu Railway	Meiji-mura		Built for Fuji-Minobu Railway, it was later used at the Tsurumi Works of JFE Steel.
