= JNR Class C57 =

Class of 201 Japanese 4-6-2 locomotives

JNR Class C57 Taiwan Railways Class CT270
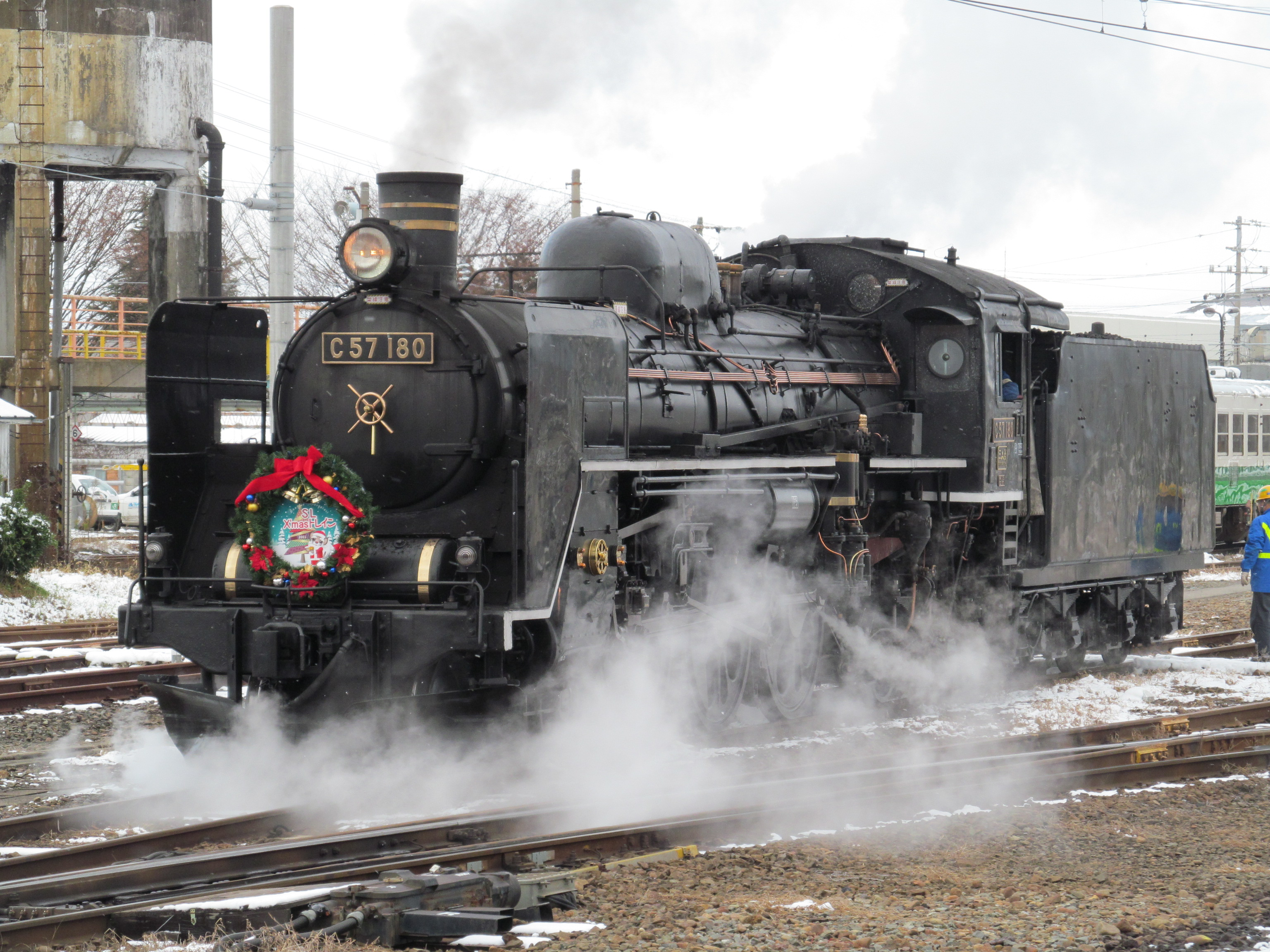
- C57 180 in 2011
Type and origin
- Power type: Steam
- Builder: Kawasaki Heavy Industries Rolling Stock Company, Kisha Seizō, Mitsubishi Heavy Industries, Hitachi
- Build date: 1937–1947 (201 for JNR), 1953 (14 for TRA)
Specifications
- Configuration
  - Whyte: 4-6-2 Pacific
- Gauge: 1,067 mm (3 ft 6 in)
- Driver dia.: 1,750 mm (5 ft 9 in)
- Length: 20,280 mm (66 ft 6 in)
- Height: 3,945 mm (12 ft 11.3 in)
- Loco weight: 67.50 t (66.43 long tons; 74.41 short tons)
- Total weight: 115.50 t (113.68 long tons; 127.32 short tons)
- Fuel type: Coal
- Firebox
  - Grate area: 11.4 square metres (122.7 sq ft)
- Boiler pressure: 227.5 psi (1,569 kPa)
- Superheater
  - Heating area: 41.4 square metres (445.6 sq ft)
- Cylinders: two
- Cylinder size: 500 mm × 600 mm (20 in × 24 in)
- Valve gear: Walschaerts
Performance figures
- Maximum speed: 100 km/h (62 mph)
- Power output
  - Starting: 1,290 PS (1,270 hp)
  - Continuous: 1,040 PS (1,030 hp)
- Tractive effort: 12,820 kg (125.7 kN)
- Factor of adh.: 10,330 kg (101.3 kN)
Career
- Nicknames: Shigonana, Kifujin
- Retired: December 1975 (Japan); 28 February 1983 (Taiwan)
- Disposition: Four operational among 32 preserved, remainder scrapped

The Class C57 (C57形) is a type of 4-6-2 steam locomotive built in Japan from 1937 to 1947. A total of 201 Class C57 locomotives were built and designed by Hideo Shima. Another 14 members of the class were built for export to Taiwan in 1942 and 1953.

The class was withdrawn from regular passenger service in December 1975. The locomotives were numbered C57 1–C57 201 in Japan the TRA CT270 were numbered CT271–CT284.

== Preserved examples and Static Display ==
=== Japan ===
As of 2014, 32 Class C57 locomotives have been preserved in Japan, of which two, C57 1 and C57 180, are preserved in working order.

=== C57 1 ===
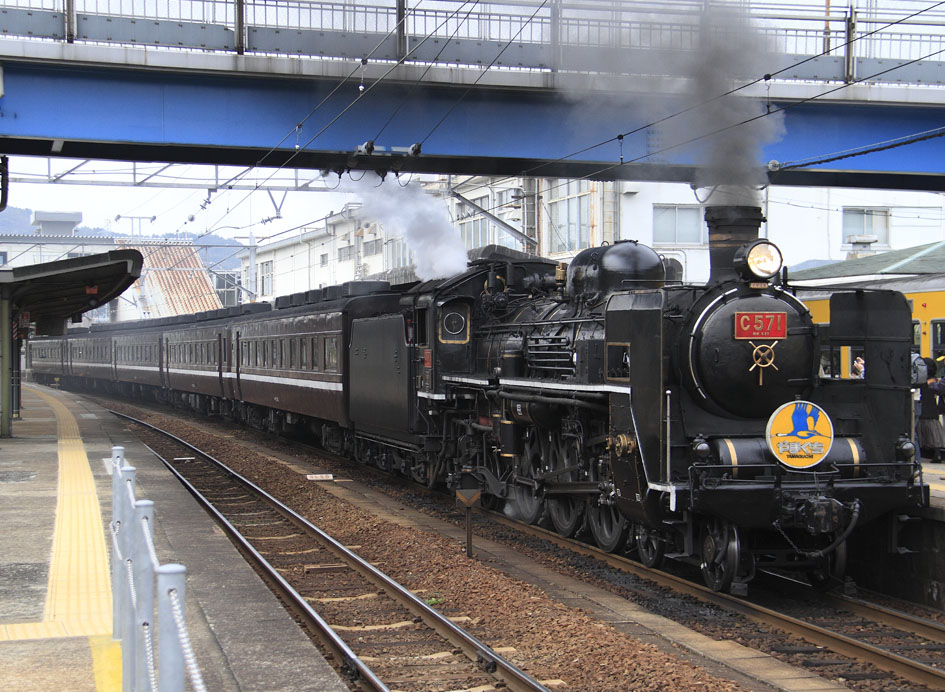
C57 1 in service, November 2009

As of 2014, C57 1 was operated by JR West and based at Shimonoseki Depot. As of 2018, it makes regular runs on the Yamaguchi line between Shin-Yamaguchi and Tsuwano The service was suspended following the July 2018 heavy rains, with C57 1 making guest appearance as the leisure train locomotive at the Kyoto Railway Museum during the forced break. The service is set to resume at the end of September 2018.

=== C57 180 ===
C57 180 was restored to working order by JR East, and hauls special event trains on JR East lines mainly between Niigata, Aizu-Wakamatsu, and Kōriyama.

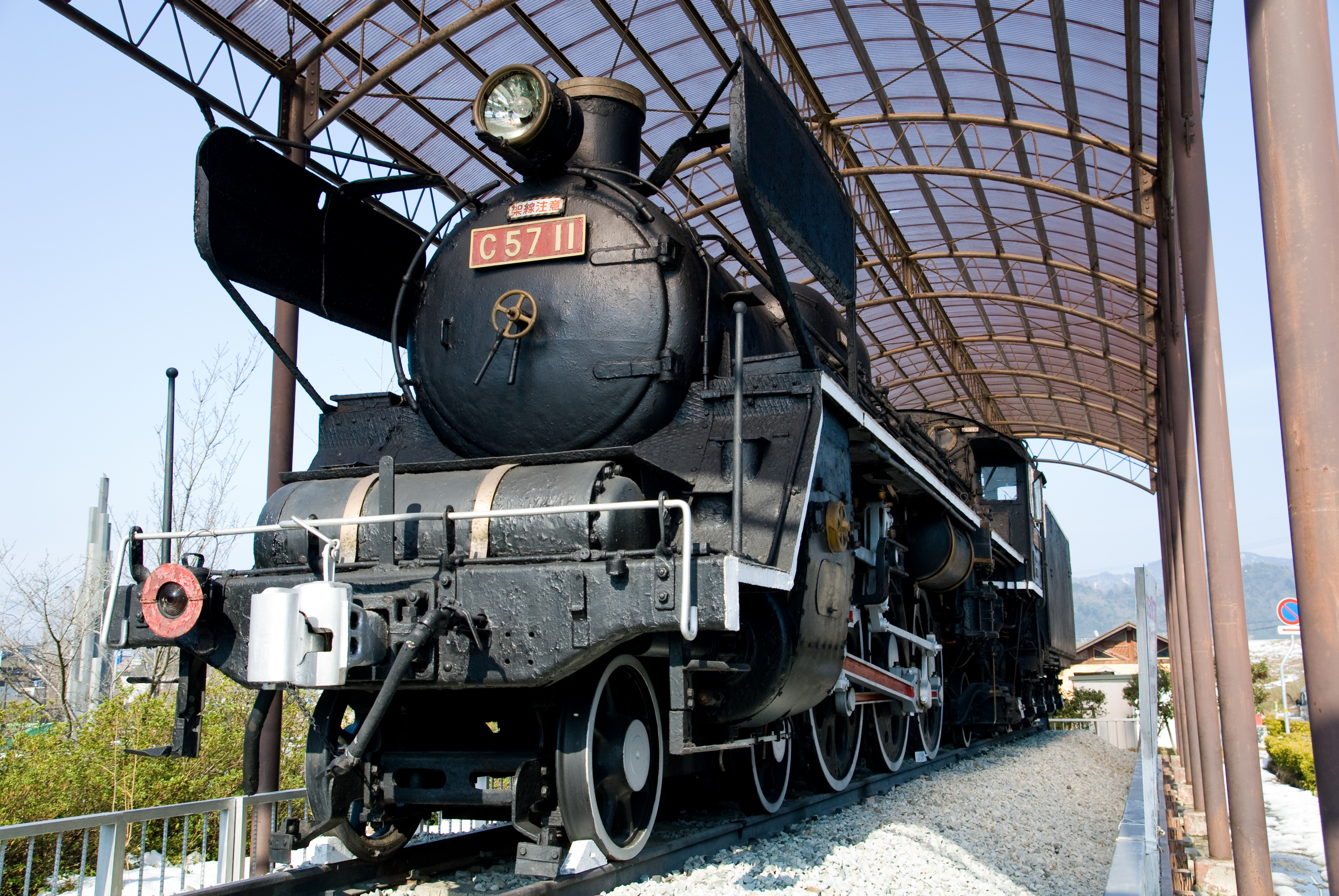
C57 11

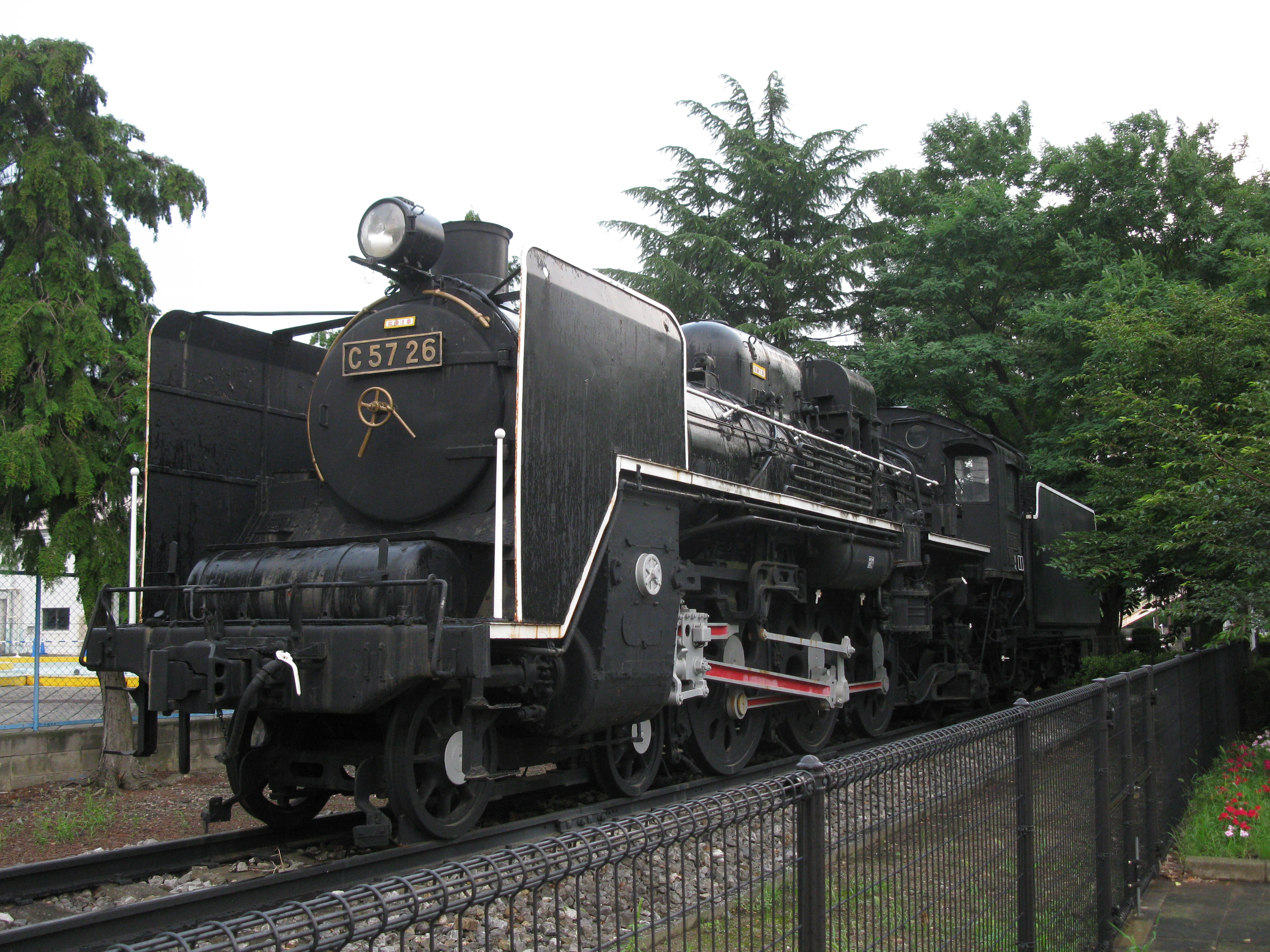
C57 26 in Gyoda, Saitama, July 2011

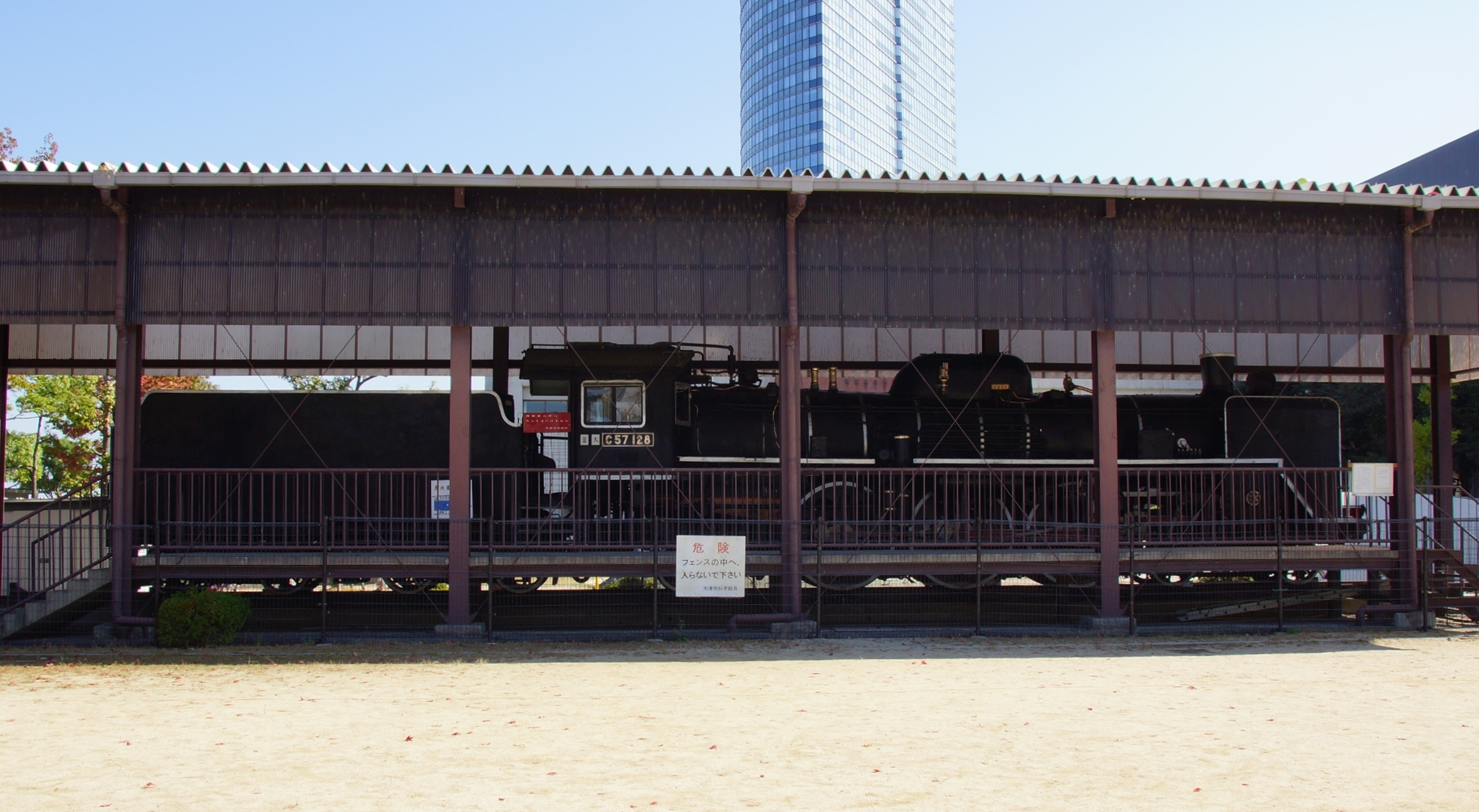
C57 128 in Otsu, Shiga, October 2013

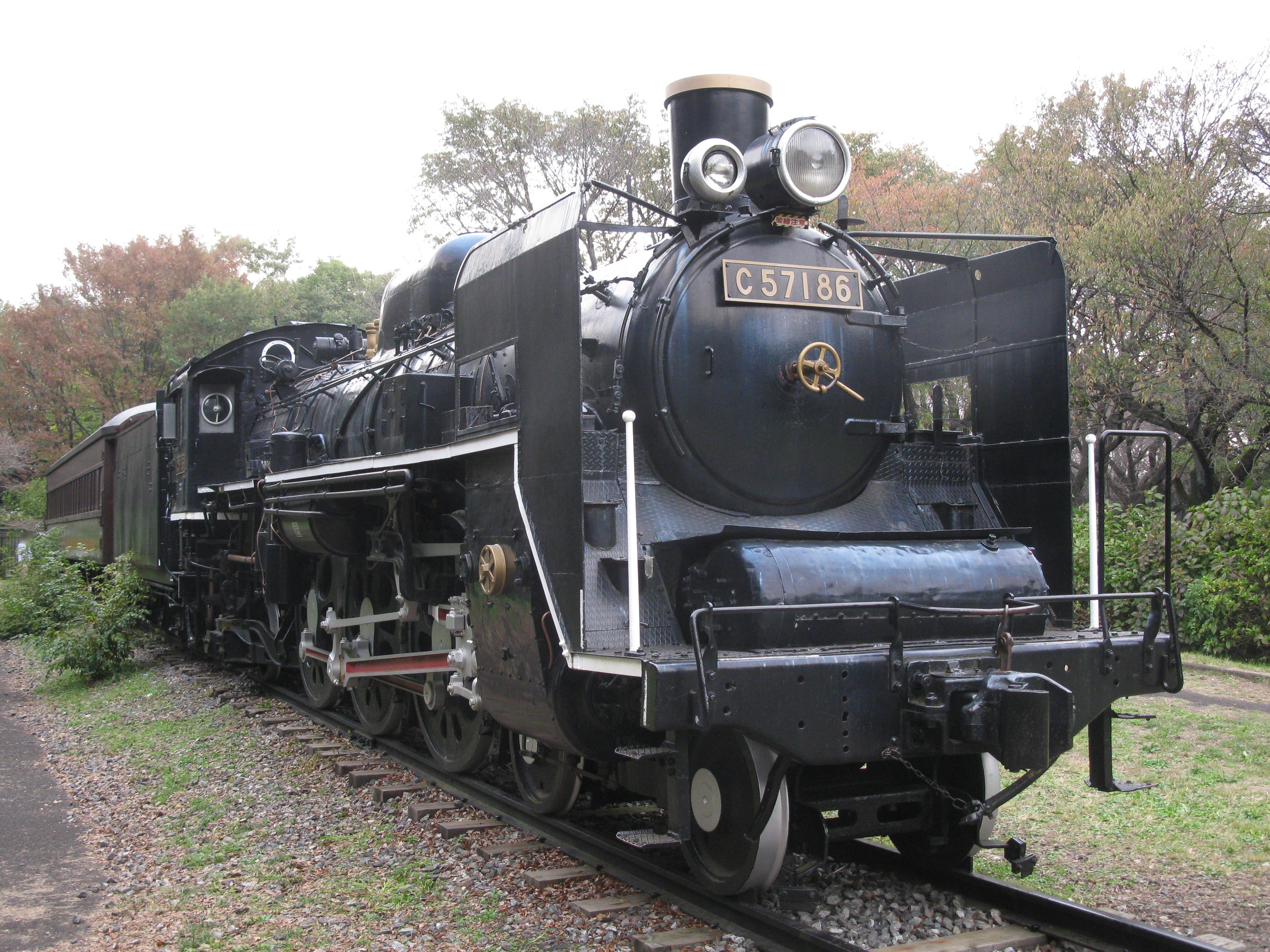
C57 186 in Koganei, Tokyo, November 2011

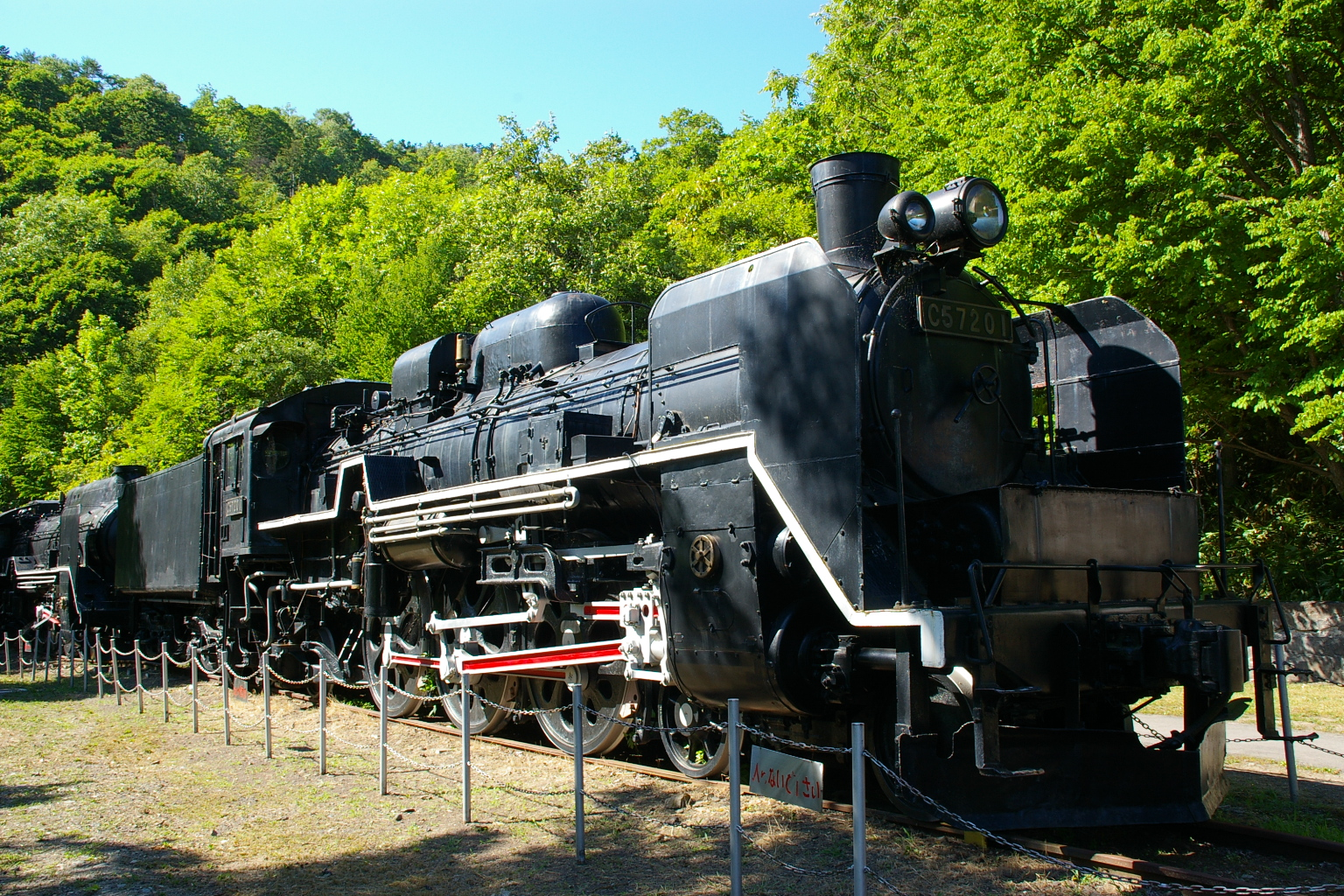
C57 201 in Asahikawa, Hokkaido

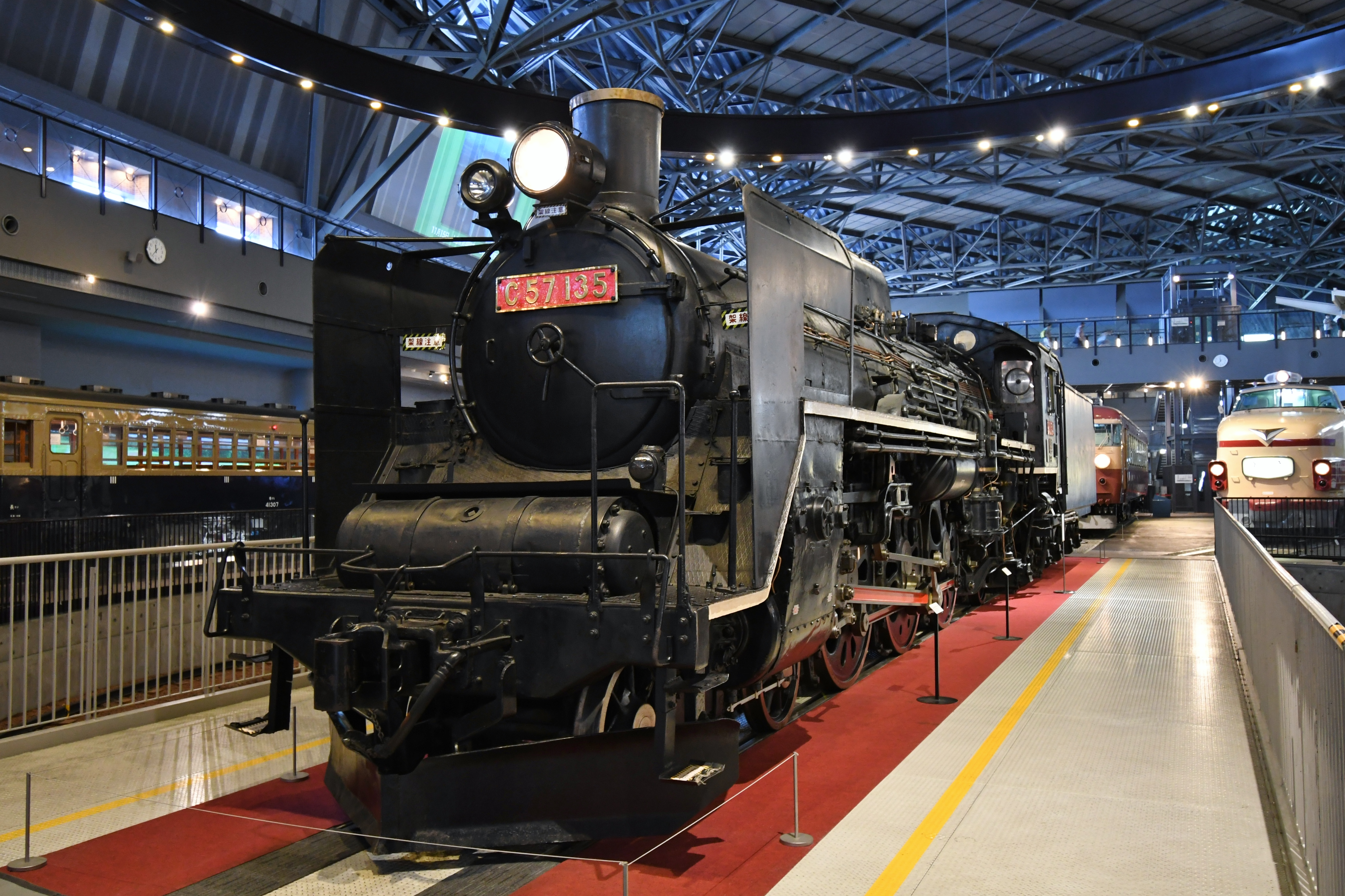
C57 135 at The Railway Museum, Saitama, in 2021

== Taiwan ==
- CT271: Preserved at Keelung.
- CT273: Preserved at Hualien rolling stock branch.
- CT278: Preserved at Ershui.
- CT284: Preserved at Yilan sports park.
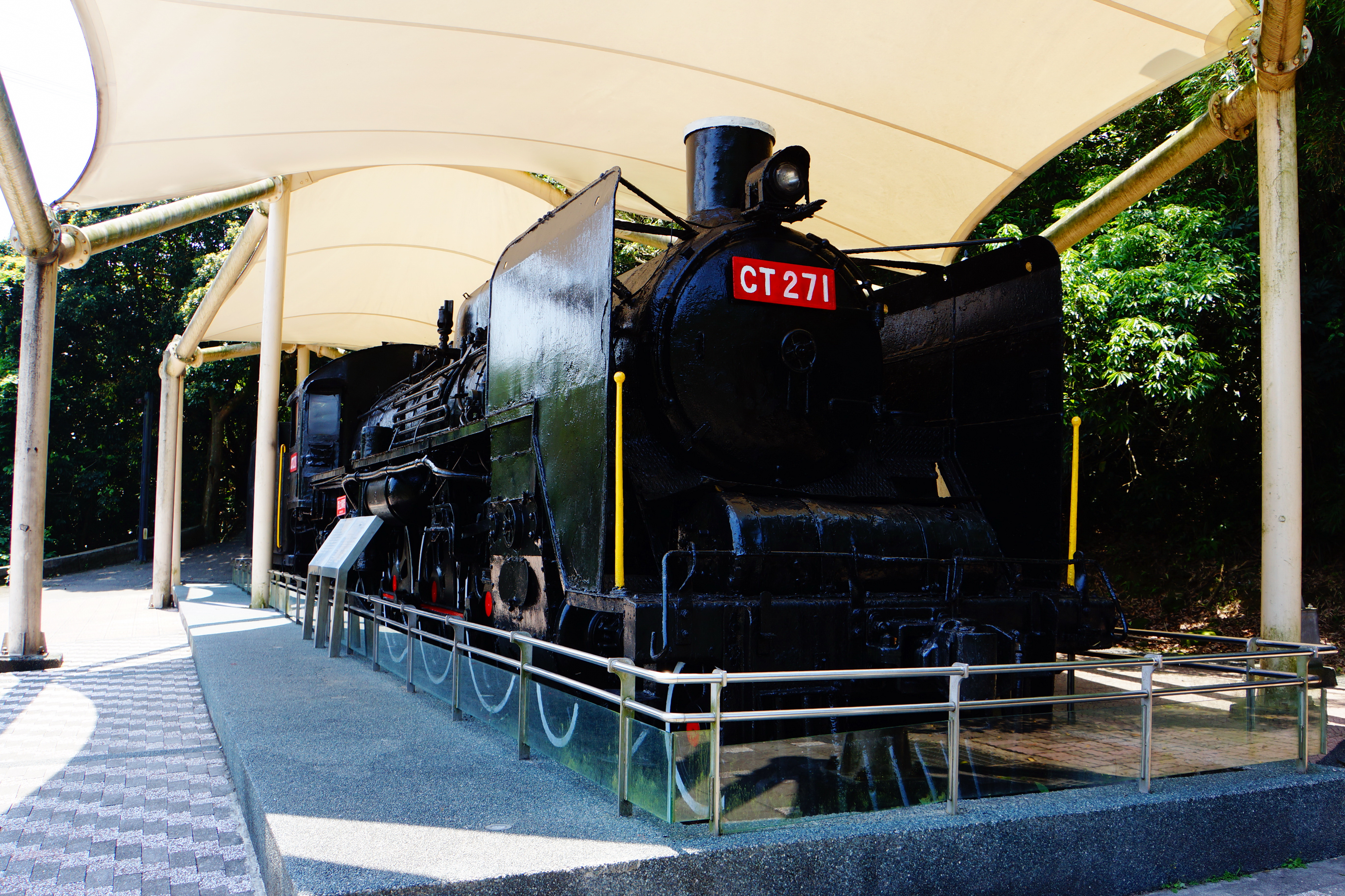
CT271 at Lovers Lake Park

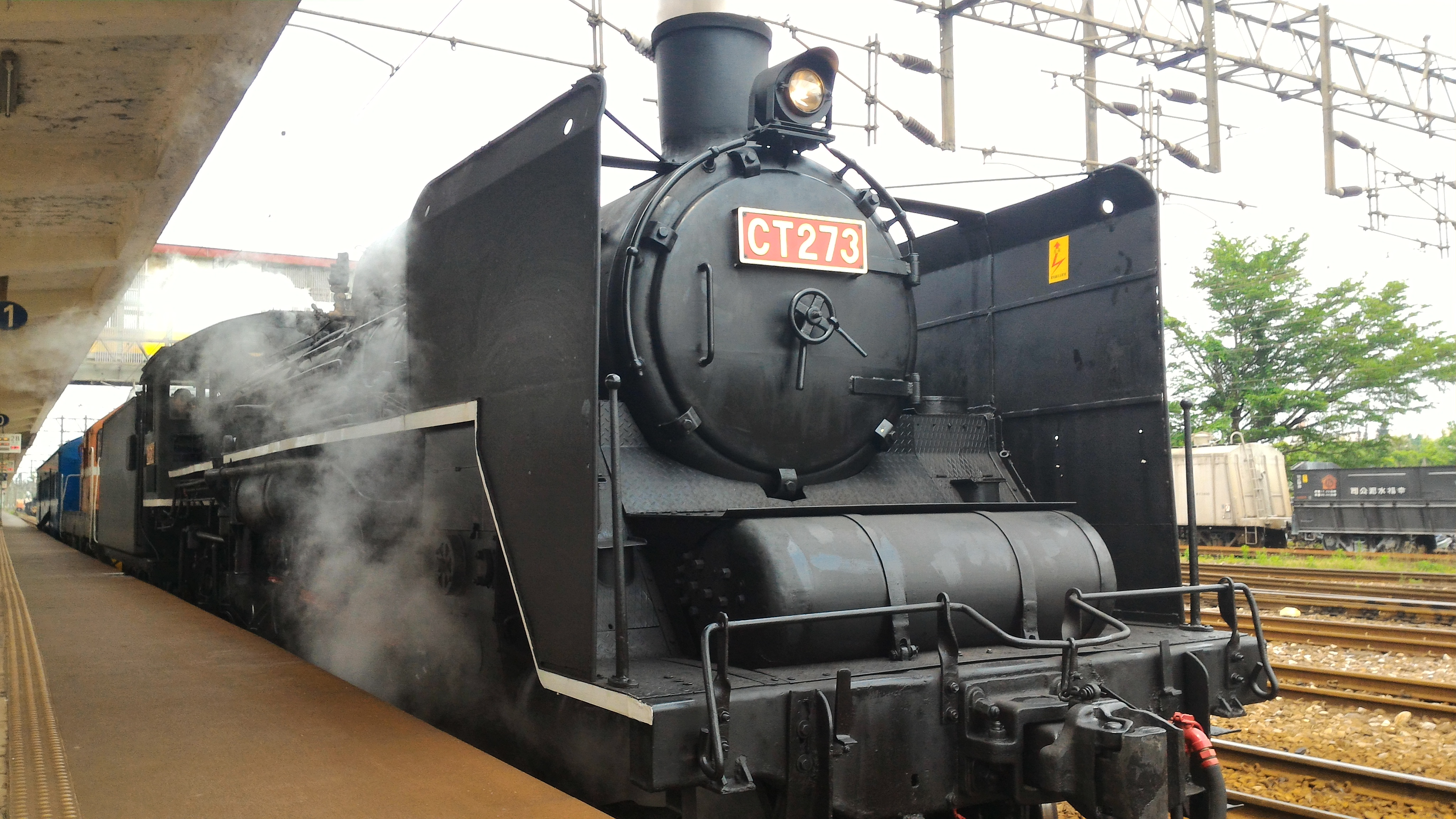
CT273 in Yilan, Taiwan

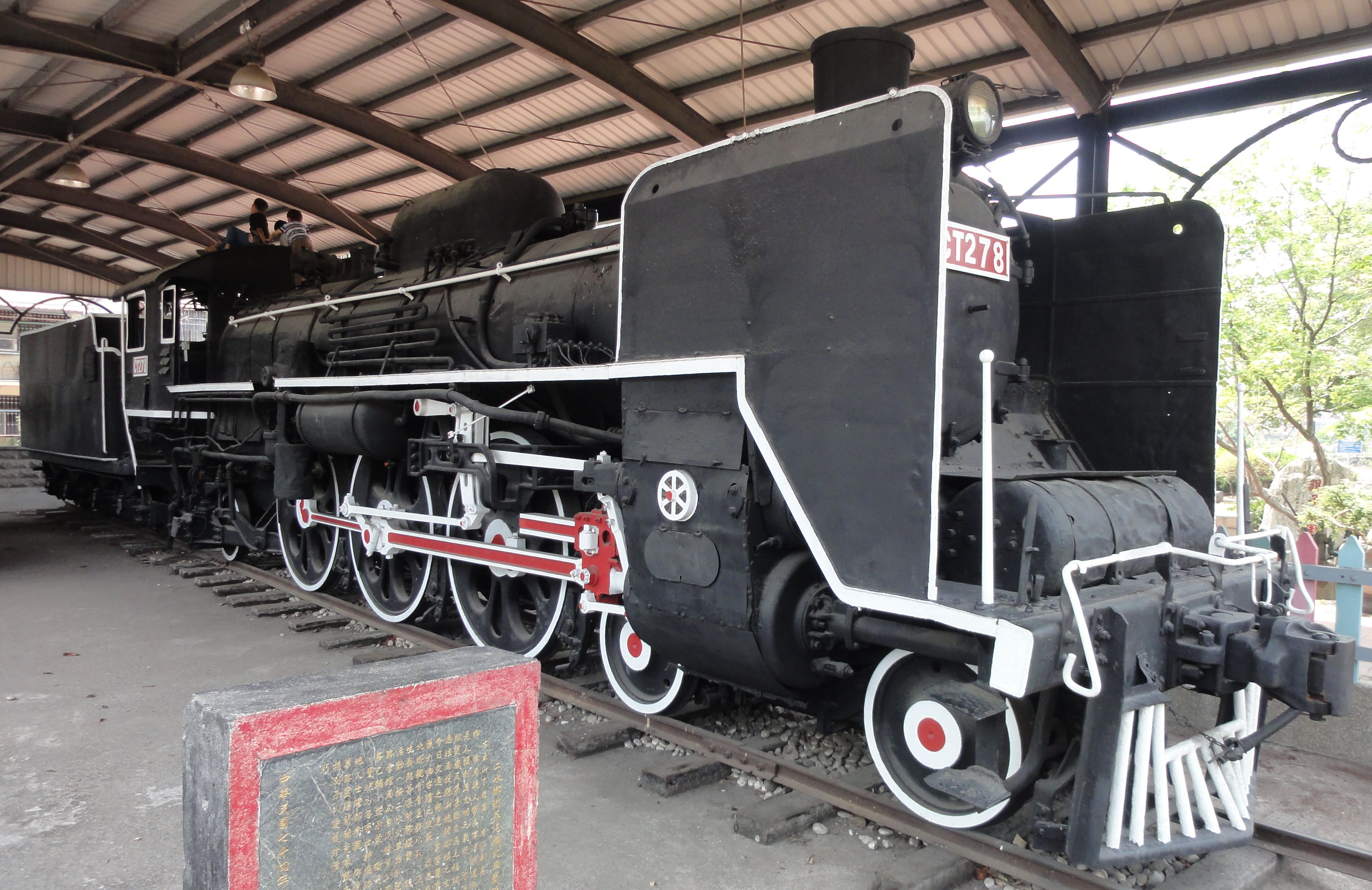
CT278 at Ershui

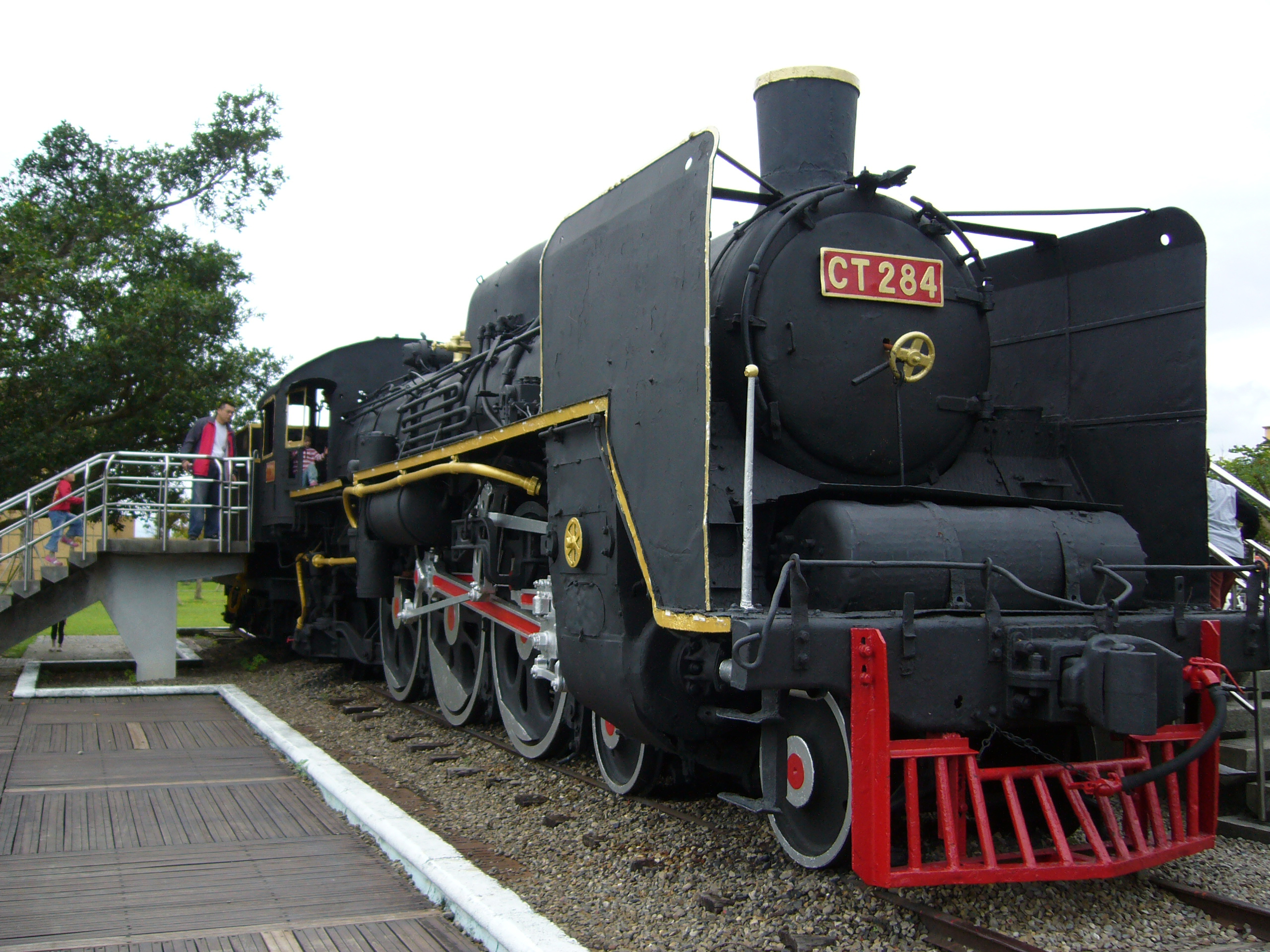
CT284 at Yilan Park

== See also ==
- Japan Railways locomotive numbering and classification
- List of operational steam locomotives in Japan
- JNR Class C55
- JNR Class C59
- JNR Class C60
