= JNR Class C10 =

Class of 23 Japanese 2-6-4T locomotives

Class C10
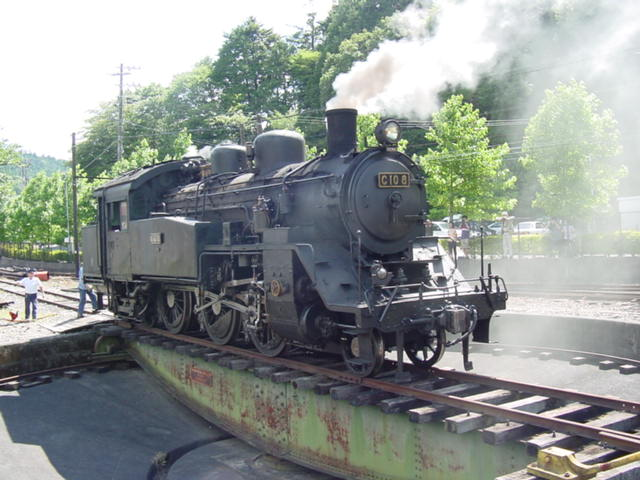
- C10 8, July 2001
Type and origin
- Power type: Steam
- Designer: Hideo Shima
- Builder: Kawasaki; Kisha Seizō
- Build date: 1930
- Total produced: 23
Specifications
- Configuration
  - Whyte: 2-6-4T
- Gauge: 1,067 mm (3 ft 6 in)
- Driver dia.: 1,520 mm (5 ft 0 in)
- Length: 12,650 mm (41 ft 6 in)
- Width: 2,936 mm (9 ft 7.6 in)
- Height: 3,940 mm (12 ft 11 in)
- Empty weight: 55.51 t (54.63 long tons; 61.19 short tons)
- Loco weight: 69.7 t (68.6 long tons; 76.8 short tons)
- Boiler pressure: 14.0 kg/cm^{2} (≈1.373 MPa)
- Heating surface
  - Firebox: 1.60 m^{2} (17.2 sq ft)
Performance figures
- Maximum speed: 95 km/h (59 mph)
- Tractive effort: 94.8 kN (21,300 lb_{f}) (Original Boiler Pressure); 101.6 kN (22,800 lb_{f}) (Increased Boiler Pressure)
Career
- Retired: 1962
- Disposition: One preserved, remainder scrapped

The Class C10 is a type of 2-6-4T steam locomotive built by the Japanese Government Railways from 1930. A total of 23 Class C10 locomotives were built and designed by Hideo Shima. They were numbered C10 01-C10 23. They were operated until 1962. Only one member of the class, C10 8, has been preserved, and is operational on the Ōigawa Railway. They would later form the basis of the JNR Class C11 in 1932.

== Preserved examples ==
- C10 8 – Ōigawa Railway - Rebuilt as Percy replica in late 2025-early 2026 for Day Out with Thomas events

== See also ==
- Japan Railways locomotive numbering and classification
- List of operational steam locomotives in Japan
- JNR Class C11
- Media related to C10 steam locomotives at Wikimedia Commons
