= Hideo Shima =

Japanese engineer

- Born: 20 May 1901; Osaka, Japan
- Died: 18 March 1998 (aged 96); Tokyo, Japan
- Occupation(s): Engineer, Chief Engineer of Shinkansen Project

Hideo Shima (島 秀雄, Shima Hideo, 20 May 1901 – 18 March 1998) was a Japanese engineer and the driving force behind the building of the first bullet train (Shinkansen).

Shima was born in Osaka in 1901, and educated at the Tokyo Imperial University, where he studied Mechanical Engineering. His father was part of a group of officials that had built up Japan's emerging railroad industry.

== Career in Japan National Railways ==
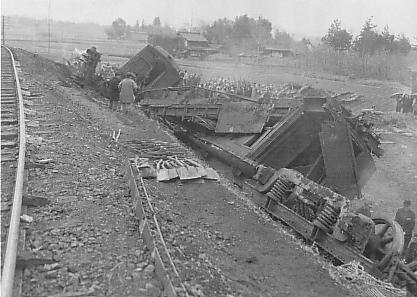
Hachikō Line derailment, 1947

Hideo Shima joined the Ministry of Railways (Japanese Government Railways) in 1925, where, as a rolling-stock engineer, he designed steam locomotives. Using new techniques to balance the driving wheels and new valve gear designs, he helped design Japan's first 3-cylinder locomotive - the Class C53, which was based on the Class C52 imported from the United States.

Shima also participated in the design and fabrication of a standard heavy duty truck which was mass-produced by Isuzu when World War II broke out. This experience helped in the rapid growth of the Japanese automobile industry after the war.

The Hachikō Line derailment in 1947 was a turning point in his career. JGR used the opportunity to obtain permission from SCAP to modify all wooden passenger cars (approximately 3,000 were in use then) to a steel construction within a few years.

Shima was also involved in the design and development of the Class C62 and Class D62 steam locomotives for express passenger trains and heavy-duty freight trains, respectively. It was during these years that he came up with an innovation that would later be employed in the bullet trains—the use of trains driven by electric motors in the individual rail cars, rather than by an engine at the front ("distributed-power multiple-unit control systems").

As Shima's career progressed, he became the head of the national railway's rolling stock department in 1948. But, after the establishment of Japanese National Railways in 1949, a train fire at a station in Yokohama that killed more than 100 people in 1951 led him to resign in the Japanese tradition of taking responsibility. He worked briefly for Sumitomo Metal Industries, but was asked by Shinji Sogō, the president of JNR, to come back and oversee the building of the first Shinkansen line, in 1955.

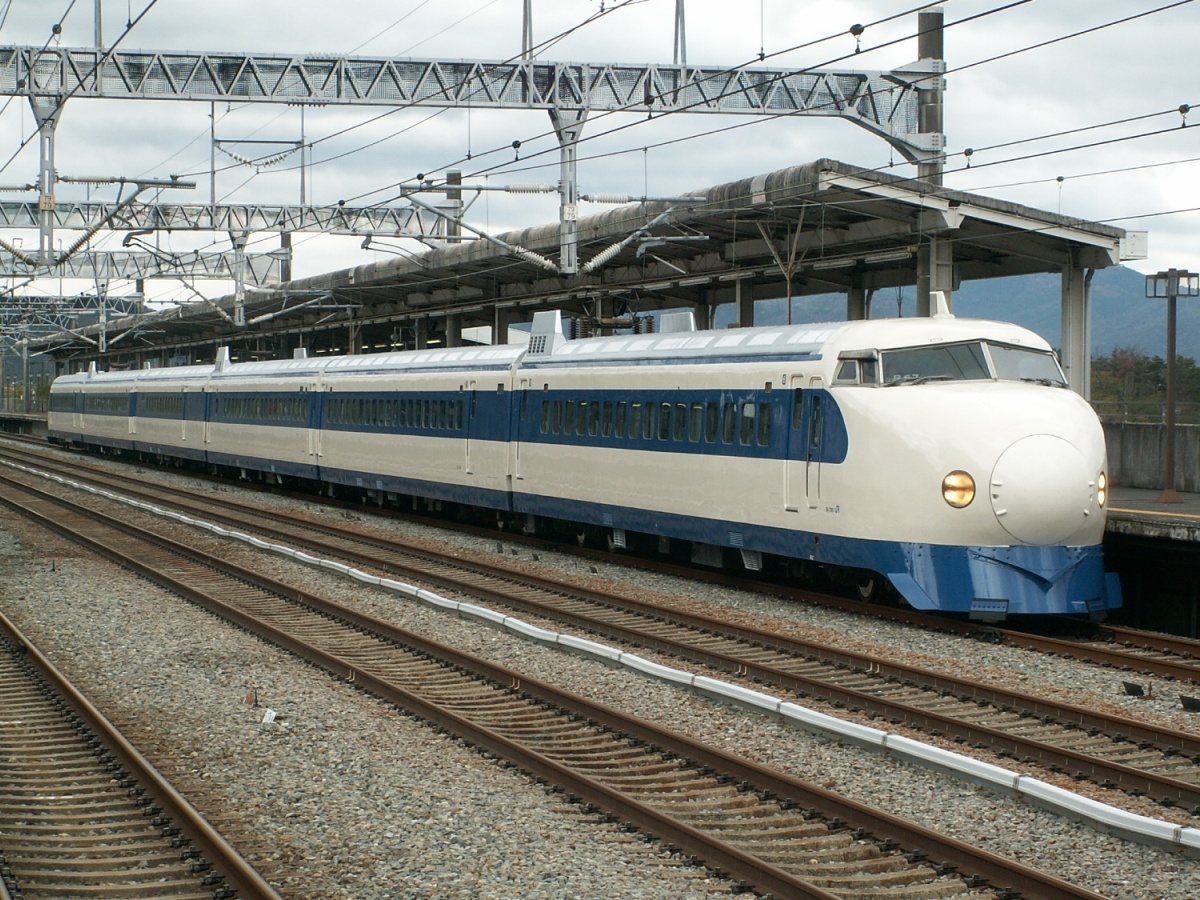
One of the original 0 Series Shinkansen trains

In addition to its innovative propulsion system, the Shinkansen also introduced features like air suspension and air-conditioning. Shima's team designed the sleek cone-shaped front from which the bullet train got its name. The cost of the first Shinkansen line also cost Shima his job. The building of the first line, which needed 3,000 bridges and 67 tunnels to allow a clear and largely straight path, led to such huge cost overruns that he resigned in 1963, along with the president, Shinji Sogō, who had backed Shima's ideas, even though the line proved to be popular and well-used.

== Post JNR career ==
In 1969, Shima began a second career, becoming the head of the National Space Development Agency of Japan (NASDA), where he pushed the development of hydrogen engines to power rockets. He retired in 1977.

== Awards ==
Hideo Shima was honored by the Government of Japan when the Emperor presented him with the Order of Cultural Merit. As one of the most prominent engineers in post-war Japan, he has also been awarded numerous international prizes and honors, including the Elmer A. Sperry Award by the American Society of Mechanical Engineers, and the James Watt International Medal (Gold) by the British Institution of Mechanical Engineers.

Hideo Shima is survived by three sons and a daughter.

== Locomotive designs ==
- JNR Class C10 2-6-4T
- JNR Class C11 2-6-4T
- JNR Class C12 2-6-2T
- JNR Class 4110 0-10-0T
- JNR Class E10 2-10-4T
- JNR Class C50 2-6-0
- JNR Class C56 2-6-0
- JNR Class C58 2-6-2
- JNR Class C63 2-6-2
- JNR Class C51 4-6-2
- JNR Class C52 4-6-2
- JNR Class C53 4-6-2
- JNR Class C54 4-6-2
- JNR Class C55 4-6-2
- JNR Class C57 4-6-2
- JNR Class C59 4-6-2
- JNR Class C60 4-6-4
- JNR Class C61 4-6-4
- JNR Class C62 4-6-4
- JNR Class 9600 2-8-0
- JNR Class D50 2-8-2
- JNR Class D51 2-8-2
- JNR Class D52 2-8-2
- JNR Class D60 2-8-4
- JNR Class D61 2-8-4
- JNR Class D62 2-8-4

== See also ==
- Sakuragichō train fire
