= Hiroshima Children's Culture and Science Museum =

Science museum for children in Hiroshima, Japan

Hiroshima Children's Museum 広島市こども文化科学館 Hiroshima-shi Kodomo Bunka Kagakukan
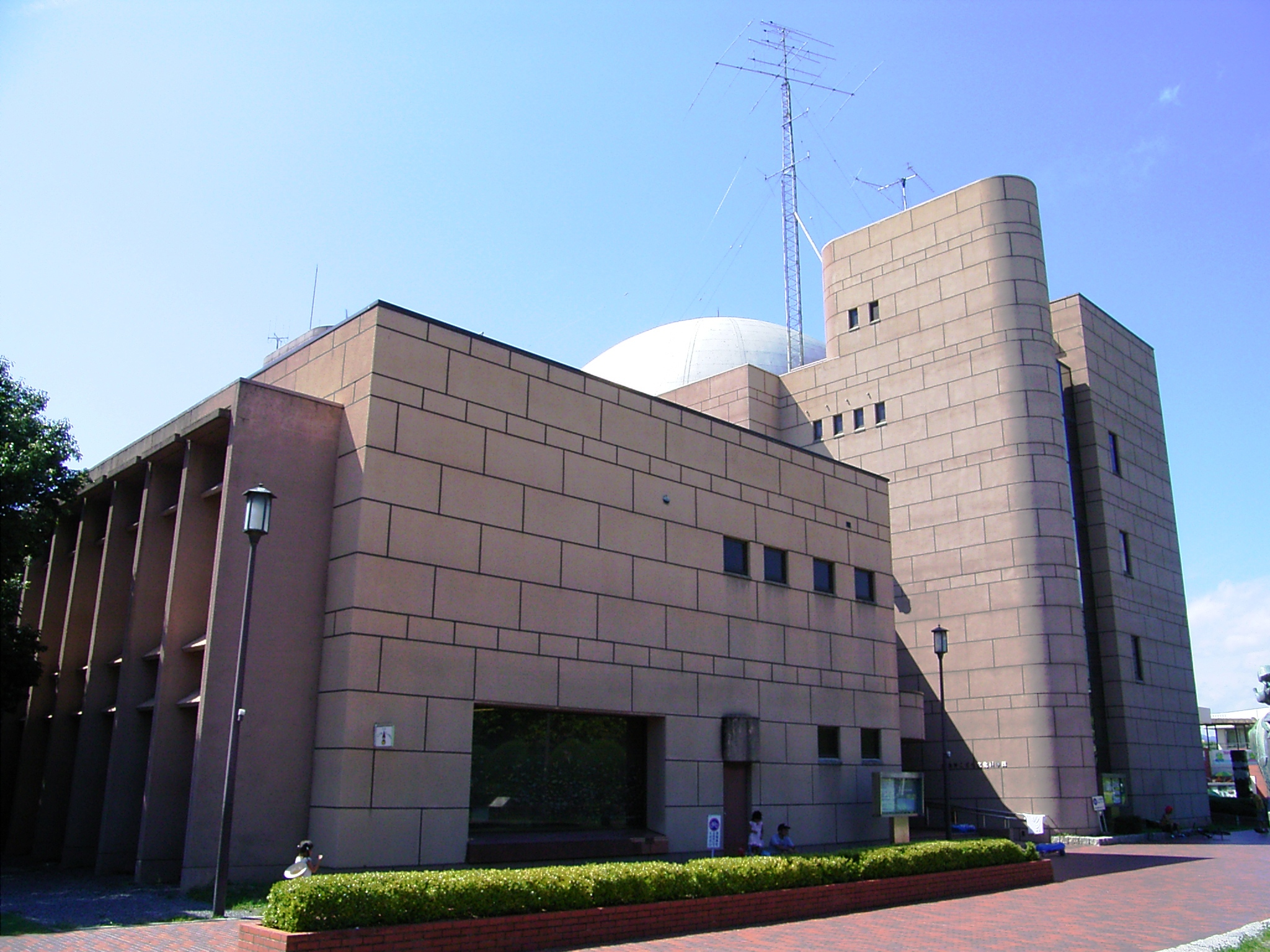
- Established: 1980
- Location: 5-83 Motomachi, Naka Ward, Hiroshima, Japan
- Coordinates: 34.398667°N 132.453639°E
- Public transit access: Genbaku Dome-mae Station, Kencho-mae Station, Hiroshima Bus Center
- Website: www.pyonta.city.hiroshima.jp

The Hiroshima Children's Culture and Science Museum (広島市こども文化科学館 Hiroshima-shi Kodomo Bunka Kagakukan), also known as the 5-Days Children's Culture and Science Museum, is a culture and science museum for children in Hiroshima, Japan.

== History ==
Opened in 1980 and situated adjacent to the Hiroshima City Children's Library, the Hiroshima Children's Culture and Science Museum offers various interactive exhibits and activities designed to engage children in learning about several subjects, including science, culture, and local history, with a hands-on approach. Aside from the permanent exhibits, the museum organizes different events, lectures, and classes, centered on various topics.

== Exhibitions ==
- Exploration hall — for the sense of science — with amusing items and apparatus
- Dreamland of the sky — for the basic science — sparks of the lightning, resonances of the lights and sounds
- Dr.Scitech's happy Laboratory — for the applied science
- Science of the Astronomy
- Theater "Apollo hall" — for the concerts, plays, musicals and other events

== Planetarium ==
- The planetarium is on the 4th floor, with a 20-metre (66 ft) diameter dome theater screen and 340 sheets
- The main planetarium projector is Minolta-MS-20AT, and the all-sky monitor and video projectors
- Programs (changed seasonally)
  - Star lights every Sunday
  - "Refretarium" (refresh with the planetarium with BGM), every Wednesday
  - Star lights short lives with piano playing or special guests, monthly every last Sunday
  - Concerts
  - Star Observations
  - Education programs for school students

== Museum shop ==
- Information and museum shop is on the 1st floor

== Programs ==
- Amateur radio club
- Japan Institute of Invention and Innovation kids club Hiroshima
- Super science museum
- Internship for courage students
- Youth science volunteer to help the events and programs
