= JGR Class 160 =

Japanese steam locomotive type

Class 160
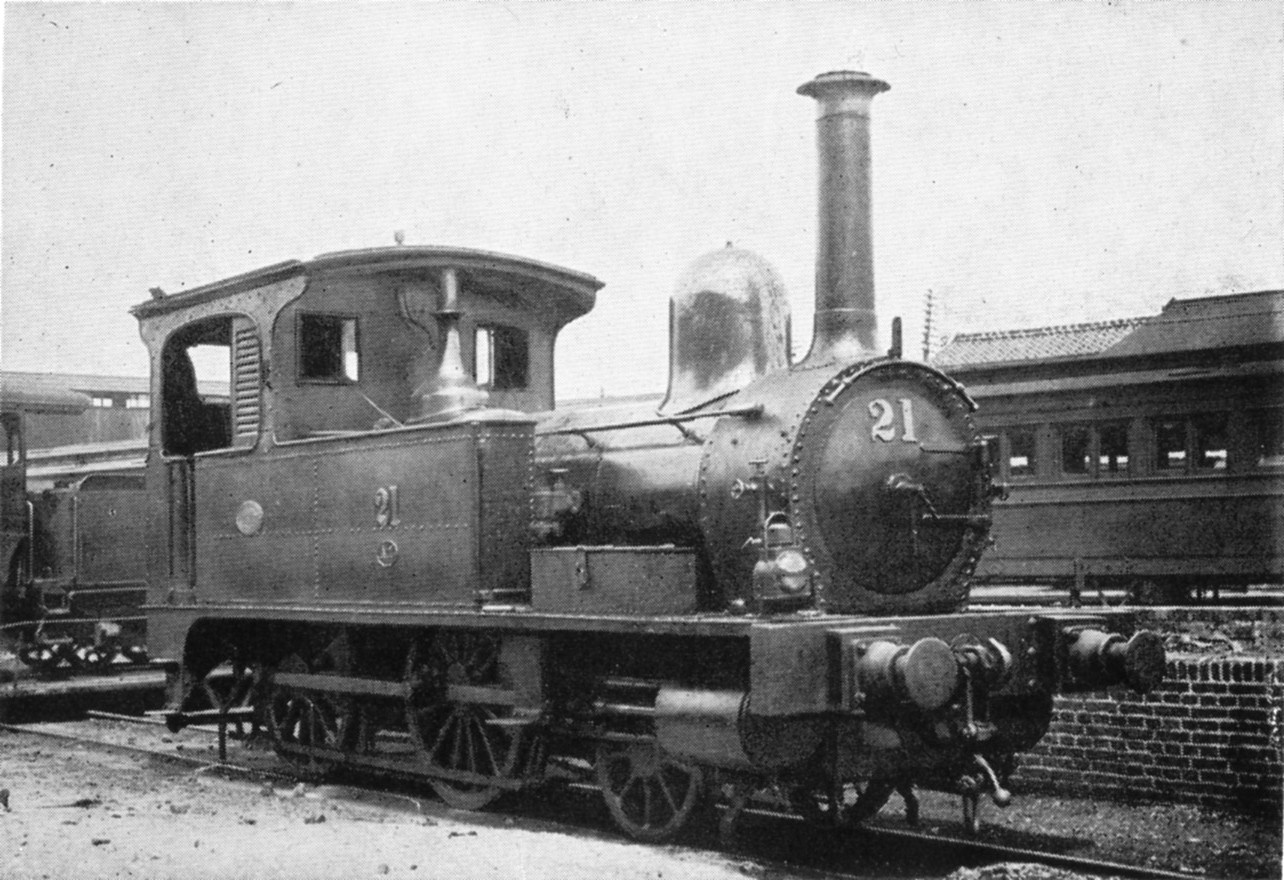
- Locomotive No. 21
Type and origin
- Power type: Steam
- Builder: Sharp, Stewart & Co.
- Build date: 1871-1874
- Total produced: 6
Specifications
- Configuration
  - Whyte: 2-4-0T
- Gauge: 1,067 mm (3 ft 6 in)
- Fuel type: Coal

The JGR Class 160 is a class of steam locomotive that was formerly operated in Japan.

== History ==
A total of six Class 160 locomotives were imported from the UK in 1871 and 1874. Built by Sharp, Stewart and Company, four locomotives were imported in 1871, with two more added in 1874.

== Preservation ==
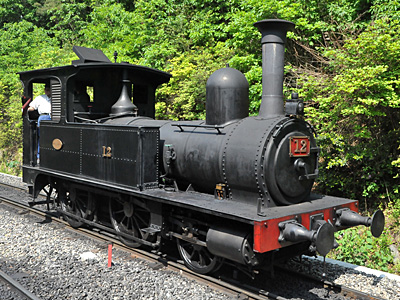
No. 12 (No. 165) in 2009

Locomotive No. 165 is preserved in operating condition at Meiji-mura in Aichi Prefecture, the oldest operating steam locomotive in Japan. While the boiler was replaced in 1985, the rest of the locomotive dates from the 1800s.

== See also ==
- Japan Railways locomotive numbering and classification
- List of operational steam locomotives in Japan
