= JNR Class C60 =

Japanese steam locomotive class

Class C60
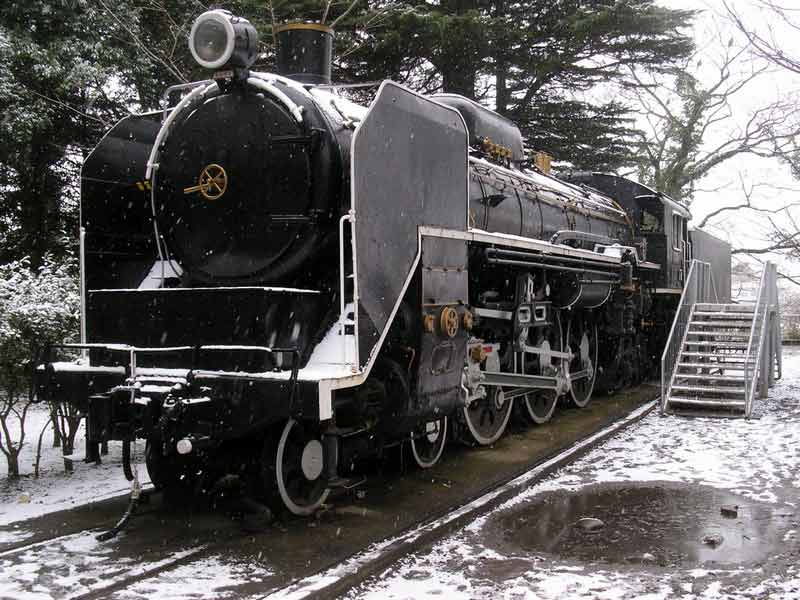
- C60 1 preserved in Sendai
Type and origin
- Power type: Steam
- Builder: Kisha Seizō Kawasaki Heavy Industries Rolling Stock Company Hitachi
- Build date: 1941-1947
- Total produced: 47
- Rebuilder: JNR Hamamatsu Works and Koriyama Works
- Rebuild date: 1953-1961
- Number rebuilt: 47
Specifications
- Configuration
  - Whyte: 4-6-4
- Gauge: 1,067 mm (3 ft 6 in)
- Driver dia.: 1,750 mm (5 ft 9 in)
- Length: 21.36 m (70 ft 1 in)
- Height: 3.98 m (13 ft 1 in)
- Loco weight: 82.9 t (81.6 long tons; 91.4 short tons)
- Water cap.: 7.8 m^{3} (280 cu ft)
- Boiler pressure: 16.0 kgf/cm² (1570 kPa)
- Cylinder size: 521 mm × 660 mm (20.5 in × 26.0 in) dia. x stroke
Career
- Operators: Japanese National Railways
- Class: C60
- Numbers: C60 1 - 39, 101 - 108
- Locale: Tohoku and Kyushu
- First run: 1953-1961
- Last run: 1971
- Retired: 1971
- Preserved: C60 1
- Disposition: One preserved, remainder scrapped

The Class C60 (C60形) is a 4-6-4 wheel arrangement steam locomotive type born from the rebuilding of 47 out of 173 surplus Class C59 4-6-2 Pacific locomotives. Hideo Shima redesigned 47 C59s between 1953 and 1961 at the JNR Hamamatsu and Kōriyama factories. 39 locos were rebuilt from pre-war C59s, while 8 were rebuilt from post-war variants and renumbered to C60 101 to 108. With the spread of electrification, lower axle loads and greater versatility had become more important requirements than sheer pulling power, so an additional trailing axle was included to reduce the heavy axle load of the C59 and allow more widespread use.

The class was most active on local and express passenger services in the Tohoku and Kyushu regions, and locos were to be seen operating in multiple (double- and even triple-headers) with Class C61s and Class D51s on both passenger and freight workings north of Morioka on the Tōhoku Main Line.

The class survived until 1971. Only one C60 is preserved: C60 1 (formerly C59 27) is in a park in Sendai.

== Locomotive Build details ==
| Numbers | Former numbers | Rebuilt at | Date |
|---|---|---|---|
| C60 1-4 | C59 27/C59 62/C59 59/C59 41 | Hamamatsu | 1953 |
| C60 5-16 | C59 54/C59 21/C59 49/C59 61/C59 46/C59 23/C59 58/C59 34/C59 65/ C59 69/C59 4/C59 50 | Hamamatsu | 1954 |
| C60 17 | C59 86 | Hamamatsu | 1955 |
| C60 18-22 | C59 78/C59 100/C59 16/C59 70/C59 48 | Kōriyama | 1960 |
| C60 23-33 | C59 17/C59 38/C59 76/C59 40/C59 47/C59 10/C59 91/C59 18/C59 60/ C59 81/C59 68 | Hamamatsu | 1960 |
| C60 34-39 | C59 26/C59 13/C59 39/C59 5/C59 89/C59 98 | Hamamatsu | 1961 |
| C60 101-105 | C59 130/C59 178/C59 128/C59 168/C59 101 | Hamamatsu | 1960 |
| C60 106-108 | C59 113/C59 165/C59 173 | Hamamatsu | 1961 |

== See also ==
- Japan Railways locomotive numbering and classification
- JNR Class C61
- JNR Class C62
