= JNR Class C62 =

Class of 49 Japanese 4-6-4 locomotives

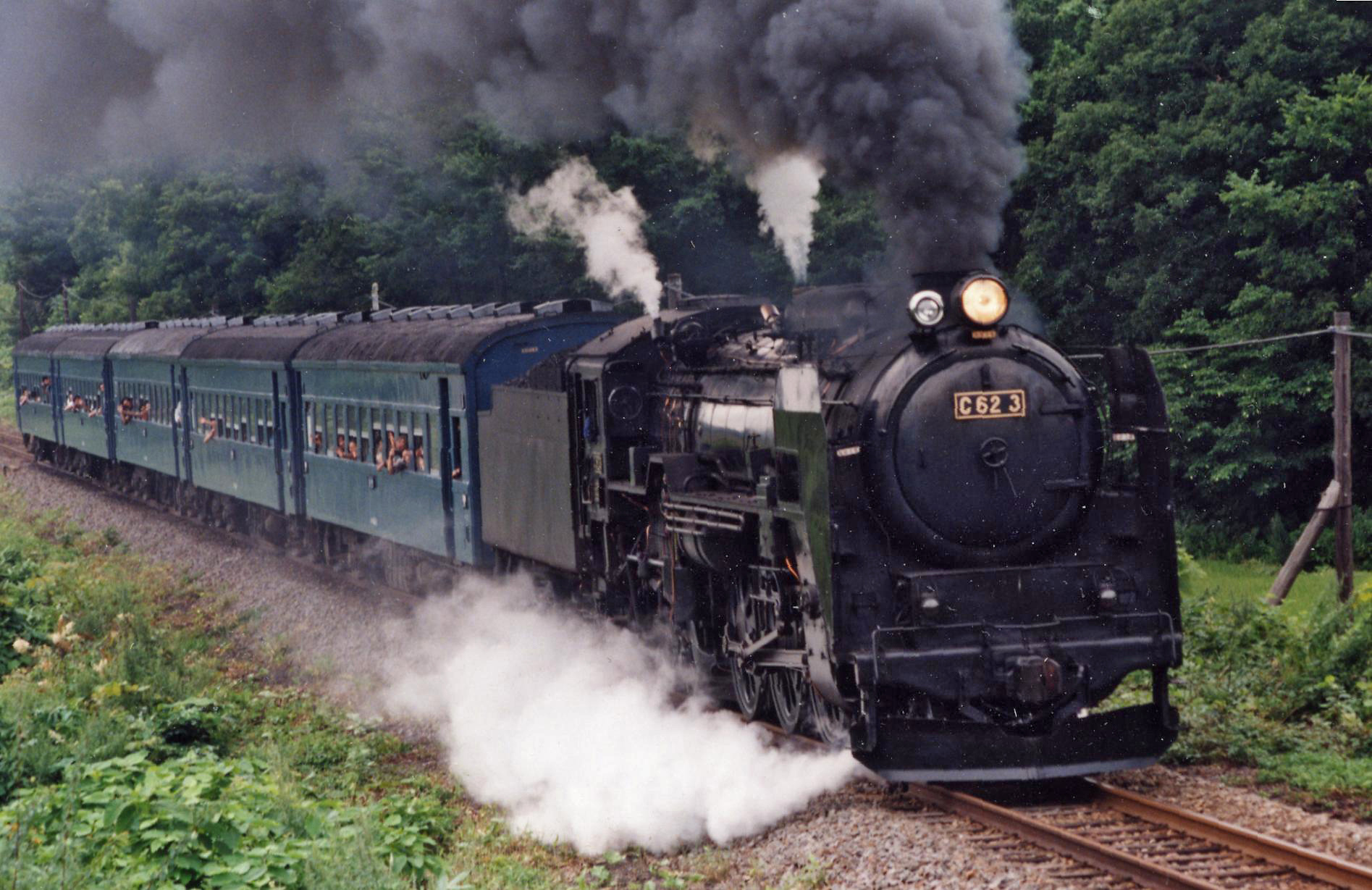
- C62 3 hauling the Niseko tourist train in 1994
Type and origin
- Power type: Steam
- Designer: Hideo Shima
- Builder: Hitachi, Kawasaki Heavy Industries Rolling Stock Company, Kisha Seizō
- Total produced: 49
- Rebuild date: 1948-1949 (From Class D52)
Specifications
- Configuration
  - Whyte: 4-6-4 Hudson
- Gauge: 1,067 mm (3 ft 6 in)
- Driver dia.: 1,750 mm (5 ft 9 in)
- Length: 21.475 m (70 ft 5.5 in)
- Loco weight: 88.83 t (87.43 long tons; 97.92 short tons)
- Total weight: 145.17 t (142.88 long tons; 160.02 short tons)
- Fuel type: Coal
- Valve gear: Walschaerts
- Valve type: Piston valves
- Loco brake: Air
- Train brakes: Air
Performance figures
- Maximum speed: 81 mph 130 km/h
- Tractive effort: 13,870 kgf (30,600 lbf)
Career
- Retired: 1971–1973
- Disposition: 5 preserved, remainder scrapped

The Class C62 (C62形) is a type of 4-6-4 steam locomotive designed by Hideo Shima and built by the Japanese National Railways (JNR). The "C" classification indicates three sets of driving wheels. The C62 was rebuilt with the boilers of older Class D52 2-8-2 locomotives.

== History ==
These were the largest and fastest steam passenger locomotives to run in Japan, and hauled the Tsubame (swallow) express on the Tōkaidō Main Line between Tokyo and Osaka. Only South Africa operated more powerful Cape gauge locomotives. Forty-nine C62s were built from 1948 to 1949. Five C62s hauled the Teine express in Hokkaido between Otaru and Hakodate after they were displaced by electrification of the Tōkaidō Main Line. Two locomotives were used to double-head trains on the 2.5% (1:40) grades between Otaru and Oshamambe, where they were a popular tourist and railfan attraction until 1971. The last examples in regular service were withdrawn in 1973.

A C62 locomotive, C62 17, broke the speed record for a narrow-gauge steam locomotive on 15 December 1954 when it reached 129 km/h (80 mph) on the Tōkaidō Main Line. This locomotive was preserved in a park in Nagoya, and later moved to the SCMaglev and Railway Park in Nagoya.

C62 2, one of the five remaining C62s until the withdrawal from the mainline Niseko Express in 1972, has been preserved in working order at the Kyoto Railway Museum. However, it now only hauls two carriages on an 800-metre track within the museum premises. C62 2 has been the most popular among all the 49 C62s, likely due to the stainless steel swallow emblems attached to its deflectors when it was part of the special locomotives for the Tokaido Mainline Tsubame (swallow) service in the 1950s. The locomotive has been given the nickname 'swallow angel' because of these emblems.

C62 3 returned to mainline service to commemorate the privatisation of the Japanese National Railways in the 1980s. However, the high cost of keeping one of the largest locomotives ever to exist on Japanese rail mainlines operational eventually left the operator no option but to withdraw it in 1995, when its boiler certificate expired. Its withdrawal left C62 2 the only operational C62.

== Preserved examples ==
As of 2012, five Class C62 locomotives were preserved at various locations around the country.

- C62 1 (formerly D52 74): Preserved at the Kyoto Railway Museum in Kyoto
- C62 2 (formerly D52 455): Preserved in working order by JR West at the Kyoto Railway Museum. This locomotive wears a stainless steel swallow on its smoke deflector as a reminder of the era when it hauled the famous Tsubame express.
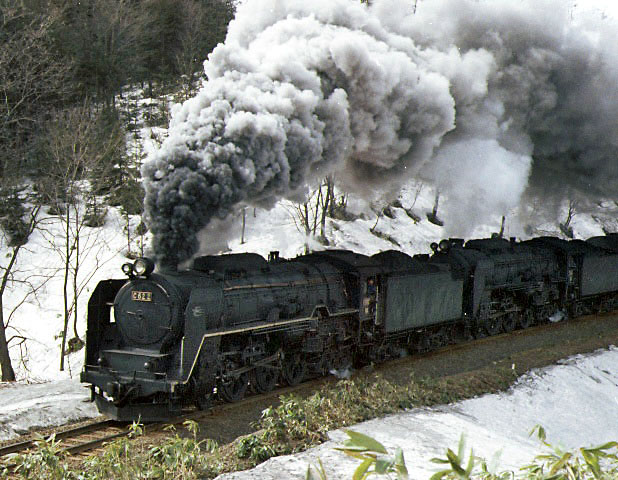
  C62 2 hauling the Niseko serivice in Hokkaido, 1971
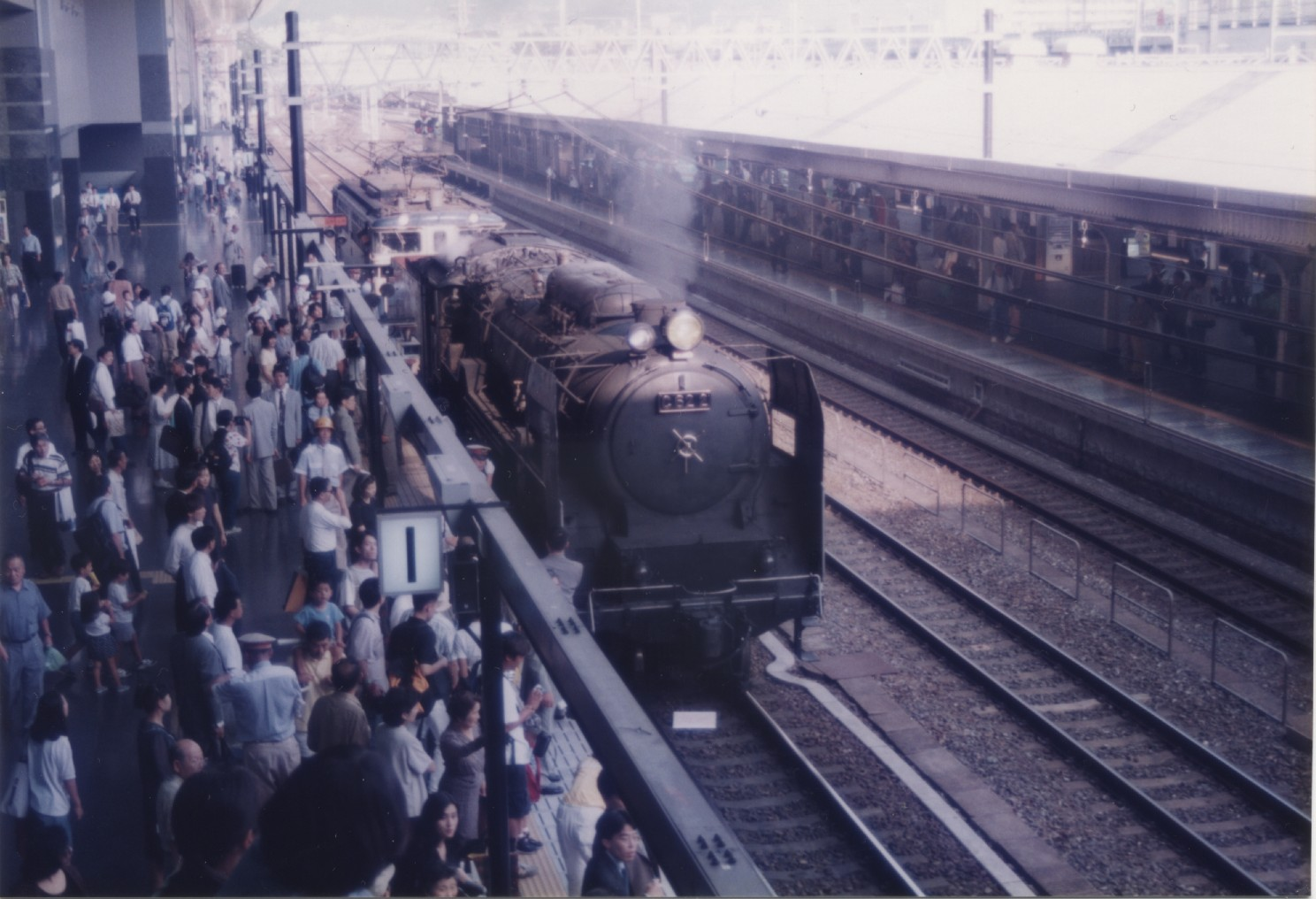
  C62 2 at Kyoto station, 1997
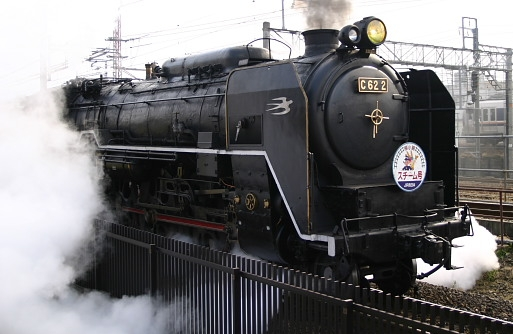
  C62 2 hauling two carriages at the Kyoto Railway Museum, 2007
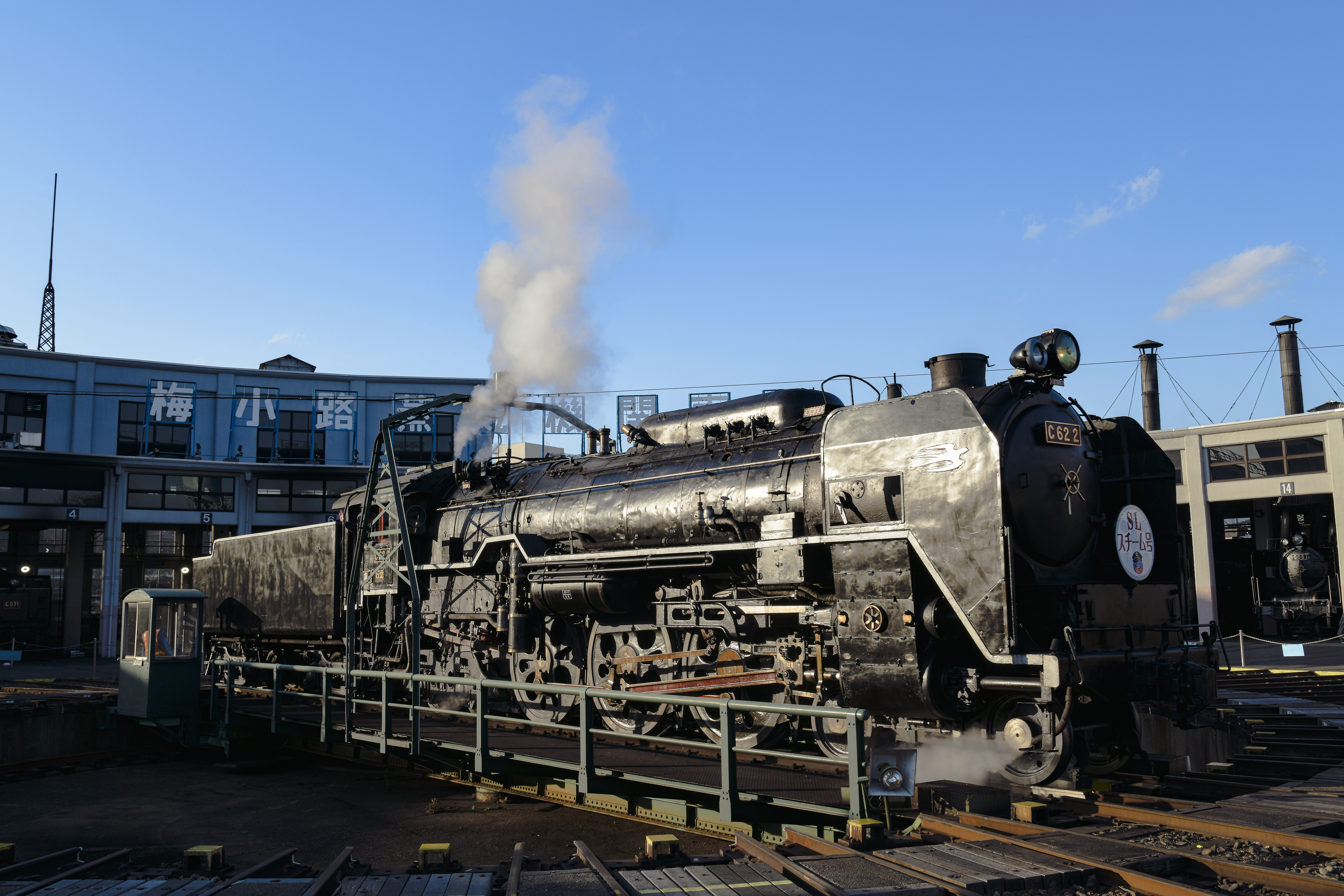
  C62 2 in 2020
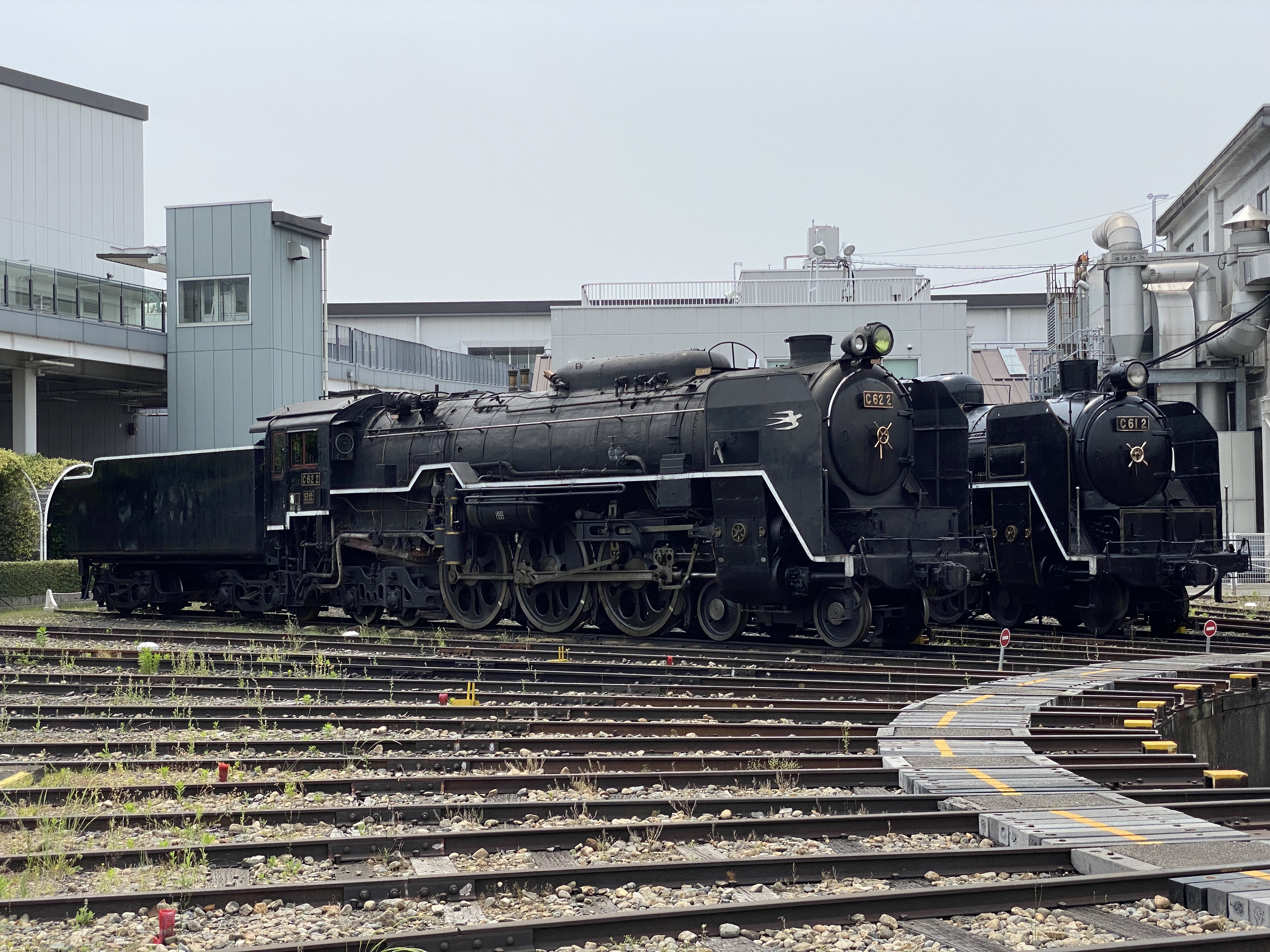
  C62 2 in 2022
- C62 3 (formerly D52 458): Preserved at JR Hokkaido's Naebo Works in Sapporo, Hokkaido
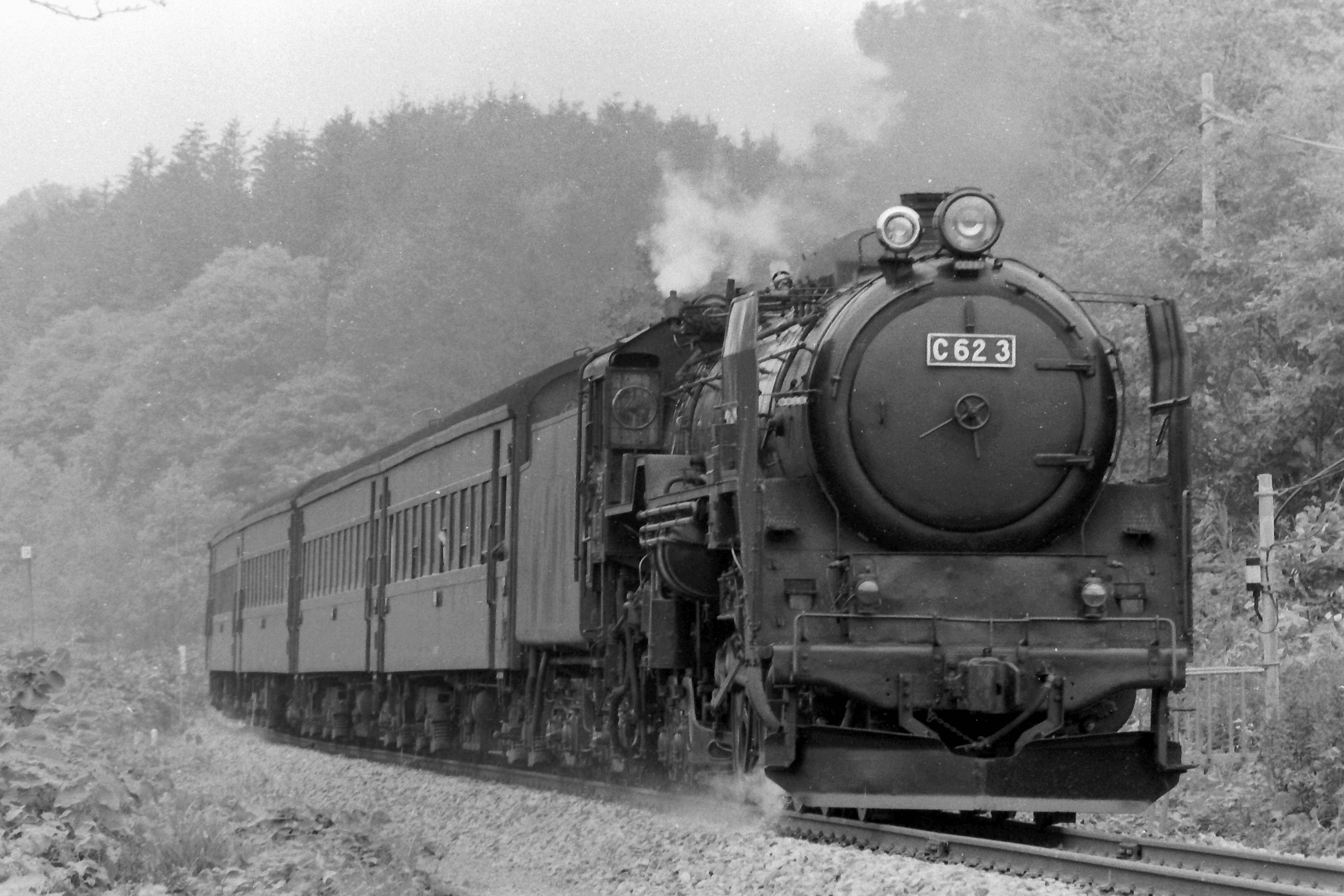
  C62 3 hauling five carriages after its return to mainline services in 1988
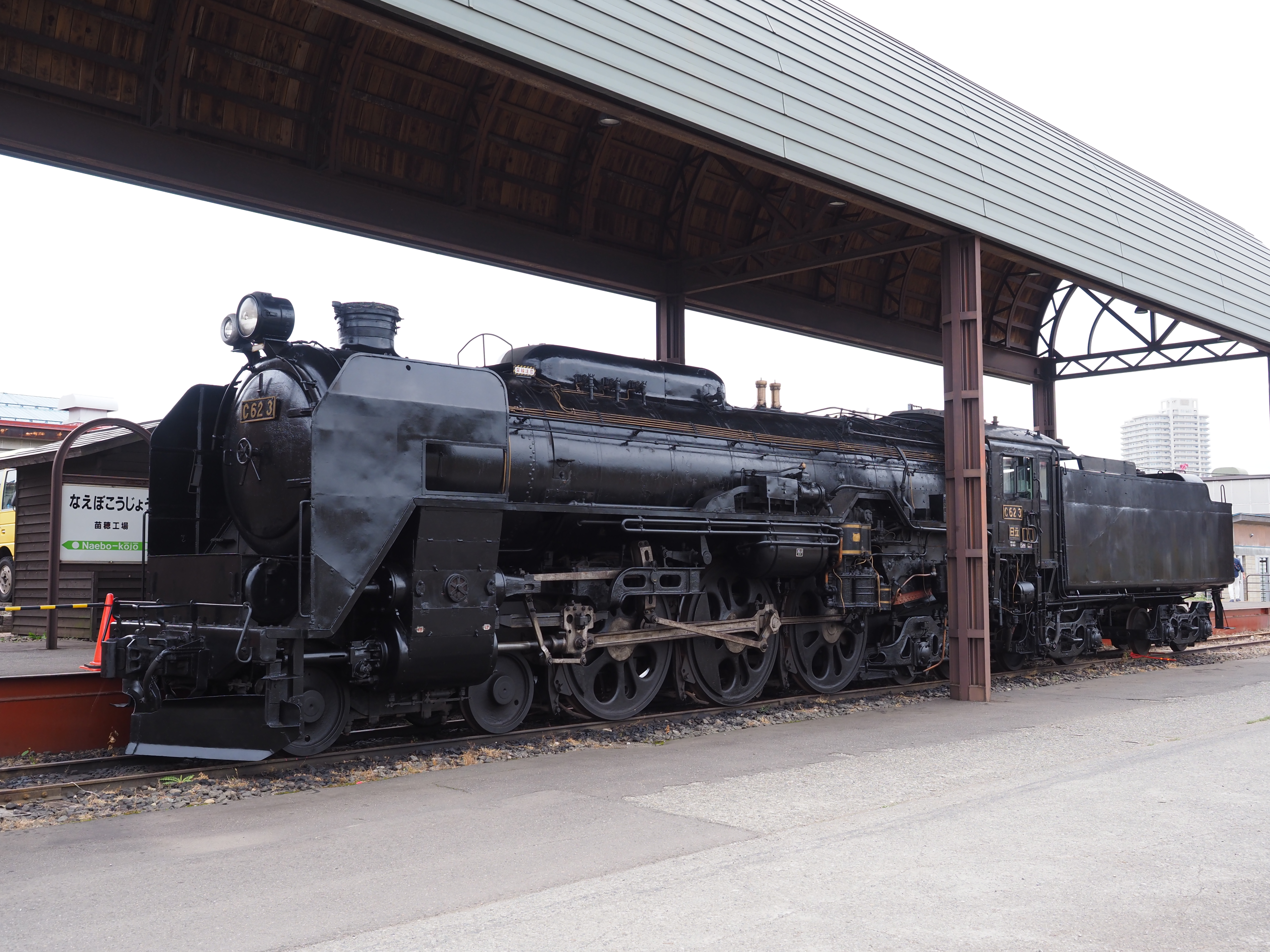
  C62 3 preserved at Naebo works, Sapporo, 2019
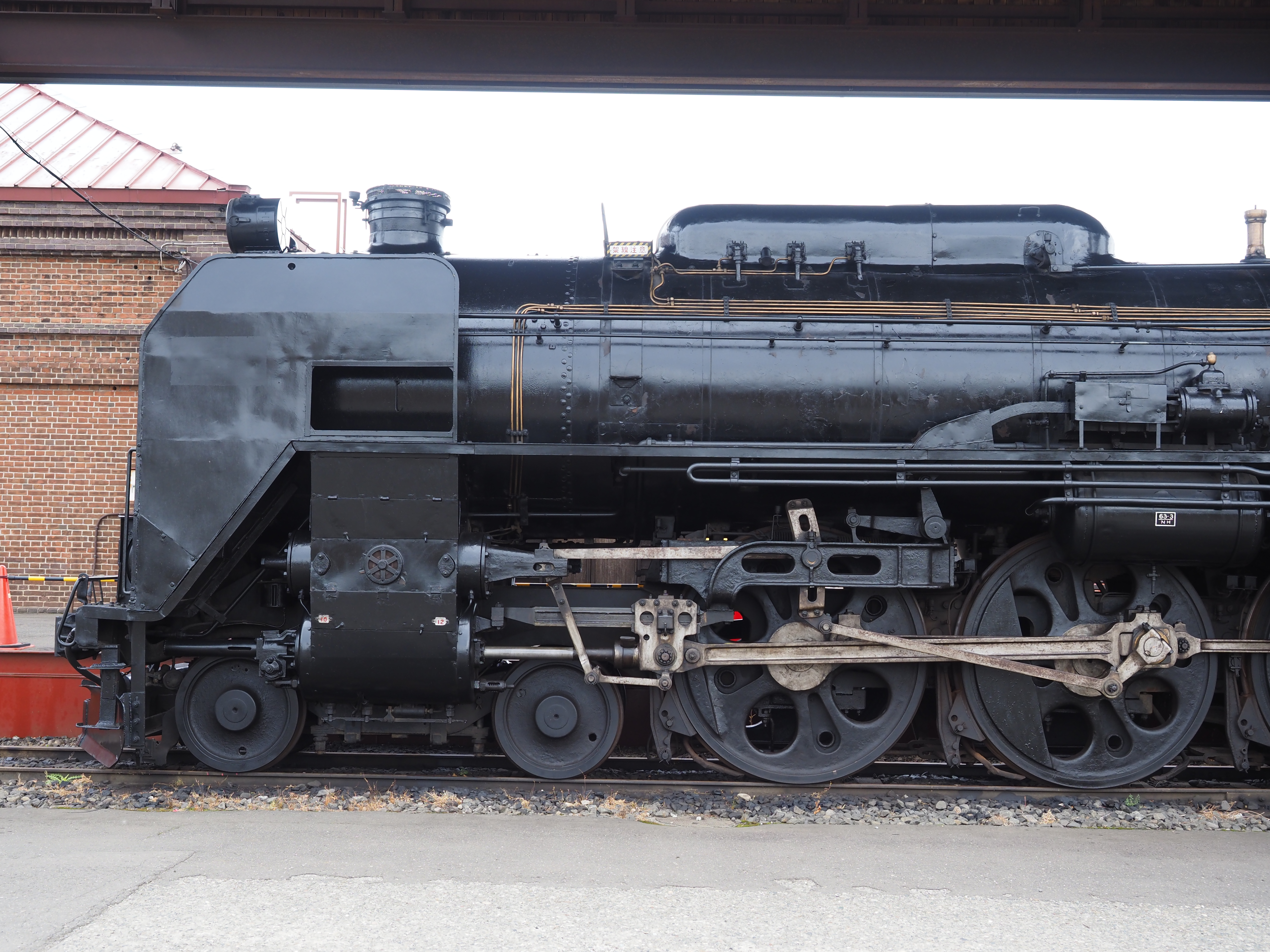
  Close-up of C62 3
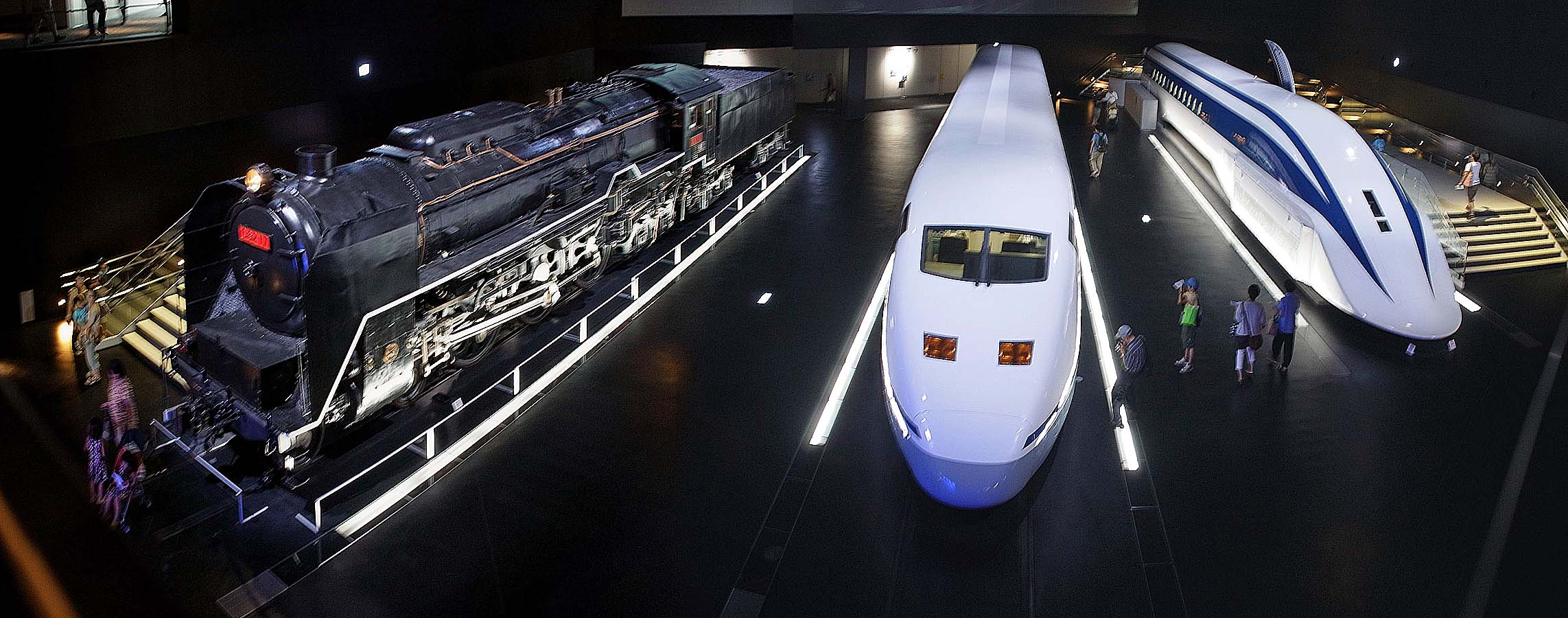
- C62 17 preserved with a Class 955 '300X' Shinkansen and a MLX01 SCMaglev
  C62 17 (formerly D52 69): On display at the SCMaglev and Railway Park in Nagoya
- C62 26 (formerly D52 46): On display at the Kyoto Railway Museum

== In popular culture ==
The C62 has achieved a level of fame due in part to the manga/anime series Galaxy Express 999, in which the express is pulled by an advanced space locomotive that is built to replicate a C62.

The founders of Hudson Soft, rail fan brothers Yuji and Hiroshi Kudo, were fond of the C62 and other 4-6-4 locomotives, so they named their company after the wheel arrangement's Hudson nickname. Japan picked up the term from the USA (where the first 4-6-4 built was named after the Hudson River), the C60, C61, and C62 used many American design elements and conventions in their designs, apparently including class names. Hudson Soft also named a number of products after the C62, including the development kit for the PC Engine, and a chip (Hu62) that was used in a later version of the hardware. It was also the code name for their console before they settled on PC Engine.

A C62 called Mr C6 is seen in Yamataro Comes Back.

An abandoned C62 in an old roundhouse appears in the seventh episode of Dash! Yonkuro.

== See also ==
- Japan Railways locomotive numbering and classification
- List of operational steam locomotives in Japan
- JNR Class C60
- JNR Class C61
