= Japan National Trust =

The Japan National Trust (日本ナショナルトラスト) is an organization which works to preserve and protect the heritage of Japan.

== History ==
In 1964, a newspaper article entitled "Destruction of the Nature" written by novelist Osaragi Jiro (大仏次郎) described the activity of British National Trust. A foundation, "Scenic Resources Preservation Foundation" (観光資源保護財団) was founded in 1968. It later changed its name to the "Japan National Trust".

The Japan National Trust has reciprocal visiting rights with National Trusts in other countries.
