= C56 31 =

Preserved C56 class locomotive

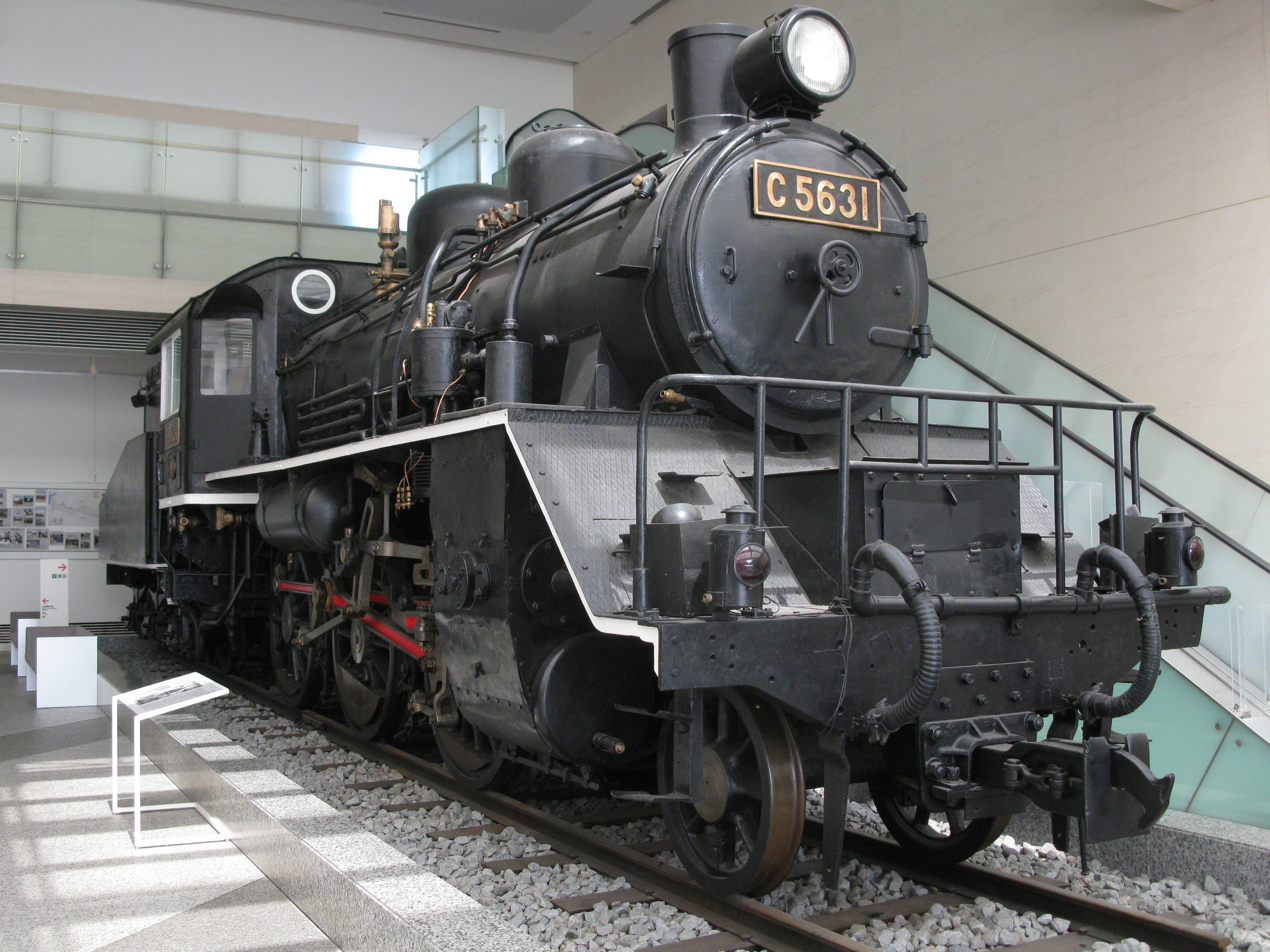
- C56 31 at the Yushukan in June 2011
Type and origin
- Power type: Steam
- Builder: Nippon Sharyo
- Build date: 1936
Specifications
- Configuration
  - Whyte: 2-6-0
- Gauge: 1,067 mm (3 ft 6 in) (JGR); 1,000 mm (3 ft 3 3/8 in) (IJA, SRT)
- Driver dia.: 1,400 mm
- Length: 14,325 mm
- Total weight: 65.53 t
Performance figures
- Tractive effort: 8,290 kg
Career
- Operators: Japanese Government Railways; Imperial Japanese Army; State Railway of Thailand
- Retired: 1977
- Current owner: Yūshūkan Museum, Tokyo
- Disposition: Static display

C56 31 was the 31st of the Class C56 steam locomotives produced by Japanese Government Railways (JGR). It was manufactured by Nippon Sharyo in 1936 and was operated on the Nanao Line in Ishikawa Prefecture before the war. C56 31 was the first locomotive to run on the Thai-Burma Railway, also known as the Death Railway. It operated there during the war, after which it was used in Thailand. Following the end of its service in Thailand in 1977, it was returned to Japan and restored, and is now displayed in the Yūshūkan, the museum attached to Yasukuni Shrine in Tokyo. It is displayed without reference to the deaths during the construction of the railway, which are estimated at around 100,000.

== Wartime use ==
In 1942, C56 31 was shipped to Thailand. It was one of 90 Japanese steam locomotives sent south to regions occupied by Japan. It was used in the opening ceremony for the Thai-Burma railway and was the first locomotive to officially run on the railway.

== Postwar use and return to Japan ==
After the war it was used by the State Railway of Thailand who renumbered it from its original Japanese number of C5631 to 725. It was allocated to Thungsong Depot in Nakhon Si Thammarat alongside classmates 702, 705 and 718 (C564, 7 and 21 respectively) for a time until it was withdrawn from service in 1977, when plans were made to return it to Japan by an association of Southern Army Field Railway Corps officials. In 1979, it was returned to Japan alongside classmate number 735 (Ex- C5644) which is now preserved in running order on the Oigawa Railway in Shizuoka, Japan.

== Display at Yūshūkan museum ==
It has been displayed at the Yūshūkan museum at Yasukuni Shrine since 1979, where there is a volunteer group dedicated to preserving it. The fact that it is displayed without references to the atrocities carried out on the Thai-Burma railway has attracted criticism, particularly from people from Australia and the US.
