= JNR Class C56 =

Class of 164 Japanese 2-6-0 locomotives

Class C56
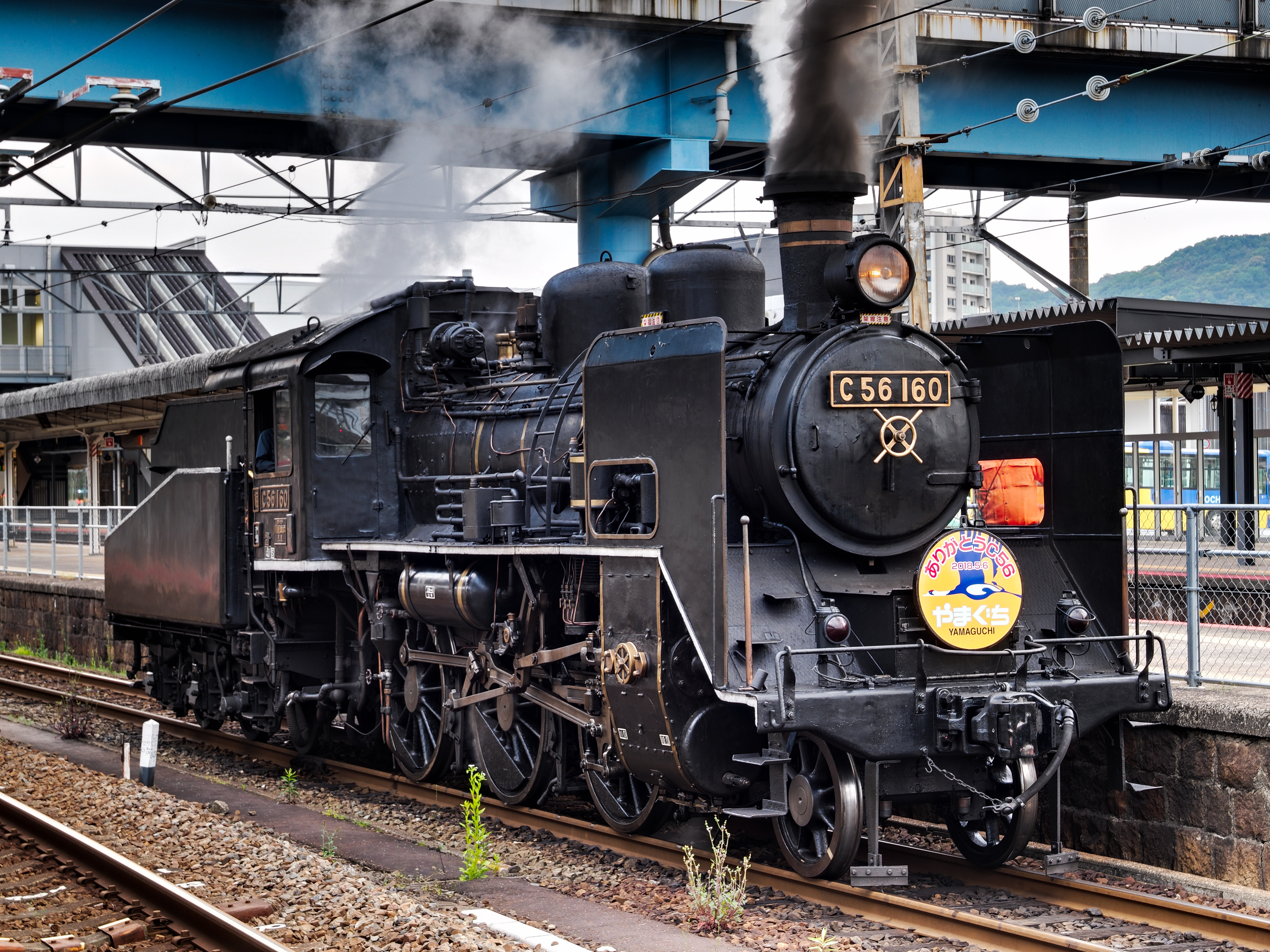
- C56 160 at Shin-Yamaguchi Station in May 2018
Type and origin
- Power type: Steam
- Designer: Hideo Shima
- Builder: Mitsubishi Heavy Industries; Hitachi; Nippon Sharyo; Kawasaki Heavy Industries Rolling Stock Company; Kisha Seizō
- Build date: 1935-1939
- Total produced: 164
Specifications
- Configuration
  - Whyte: 2-6-0 Mogul
  - UIC: 1′C h2
- Gauge: 1,067 mm (3 ft 6 in); 1,000 mm (3 ft 3 3/8 in) metre gauge (SRT / Burma Railway)
- Driver dia.: 1,400 mm (4 ft 7 in)
- Length: 14,325 mm (47 ft 0 in)
- Total weight: 65.53 t (64.50 long tons; 72.23 short tons)
Performance figures
- Maximum speed: 75 km/h (47 mph)
- Tractive effort: 8,290 kg (18,280 lb)
Career
- Operators: Japanese Government Railways; Japanese National Railways; State Railway of Thailand; Burma Railways
- Number in class: 164
- Numbers: C56 1-C56 164
- Nicknames: Shigoroku, Pony of the Plateau/Highlands
- Retired: 1974
- Disposition: 34 preserved (including 2 operational units) remainder scrapped

The Class C56 is a type of 2-6-0 steam locomotive designed by Hideo Shima and operated by the Japanese Government Railways (JGR) from 1935 to 1939, and later by its post-war successor Japanese National Railways (JNR).

A total of 164 locomotives were built between 1935 and 1939. During the Second World War, locomotives numbered C56 1 to C56 90 and C56 161 to C56 164 were sent to Southeast Asia, where some remained in service until the 1980s. The last C56 was retired in 1974, though several have been preserved and remain operational for heritage purposes.

== History ==
=== Design ===
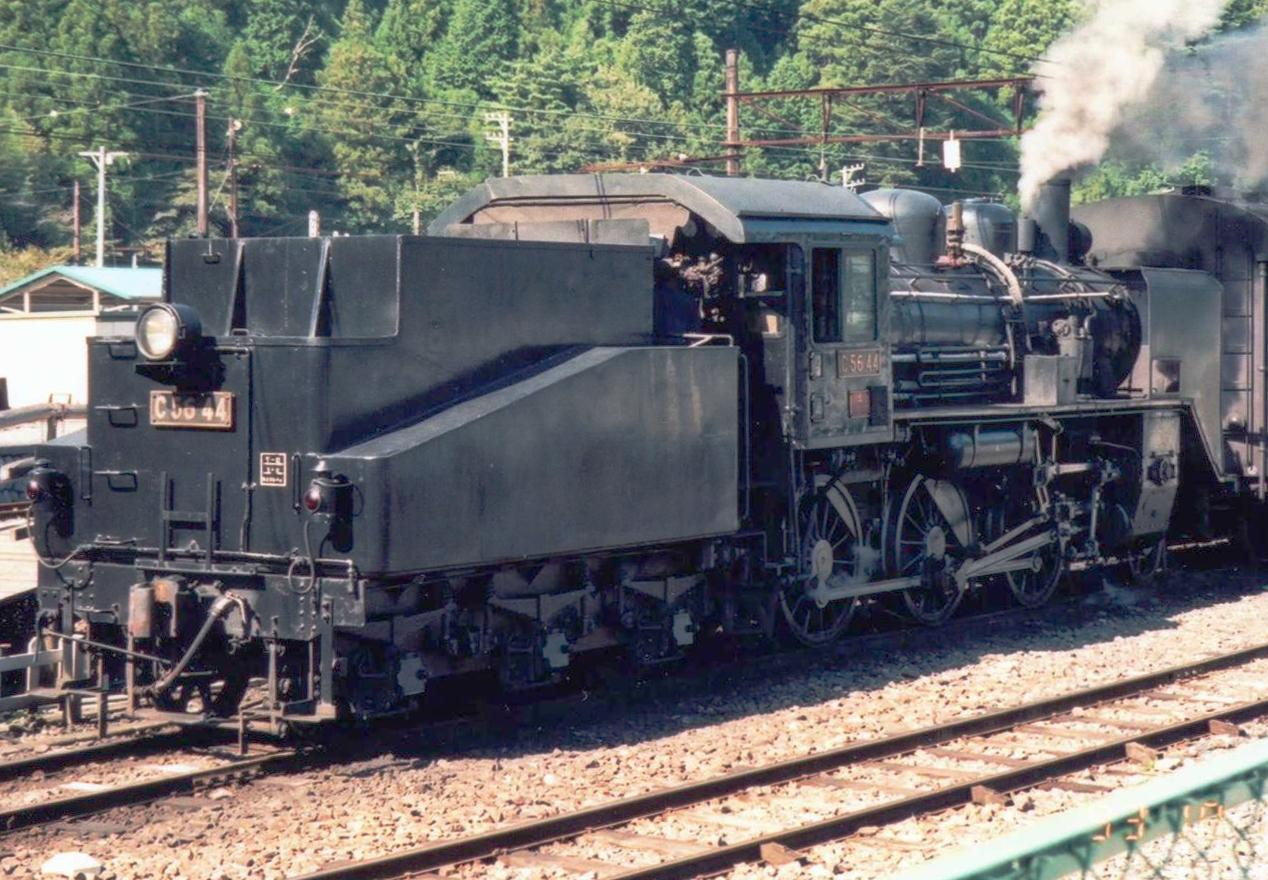
C56's tender with cut-outs to secure rear visibility

The Class C56 was a compact, lightweight design to operate on light-graded branch lines unsuitable for larger locomotives. Initially introduced in 1935, the C56 was based on the earlier C12 tank locomotive but adapted for longer distances by replacing its onboard water tank and coal bunker with a tender, which allowed for greater fuel and water capacity.

Branch lines often lacked turntables, which posed operational challenges for tender locomotives. While the C12 could easily operate in reverse, the C56 required modifications to improve rear visibility. To address this, the tender was designed with cut-outs on the coal bunker's sides, a distinctive design that facilitated reverse operation. Between 1935 and 1939, a total of 160 C56 locomotives were produced by various manufacturers, including Kawasaki, Hitachi, and Mitsubishi Heavy Industries. Additionally, four units were built for the Karafuto Railway Bureau and one for a coal mine.

=== Wartime service ===
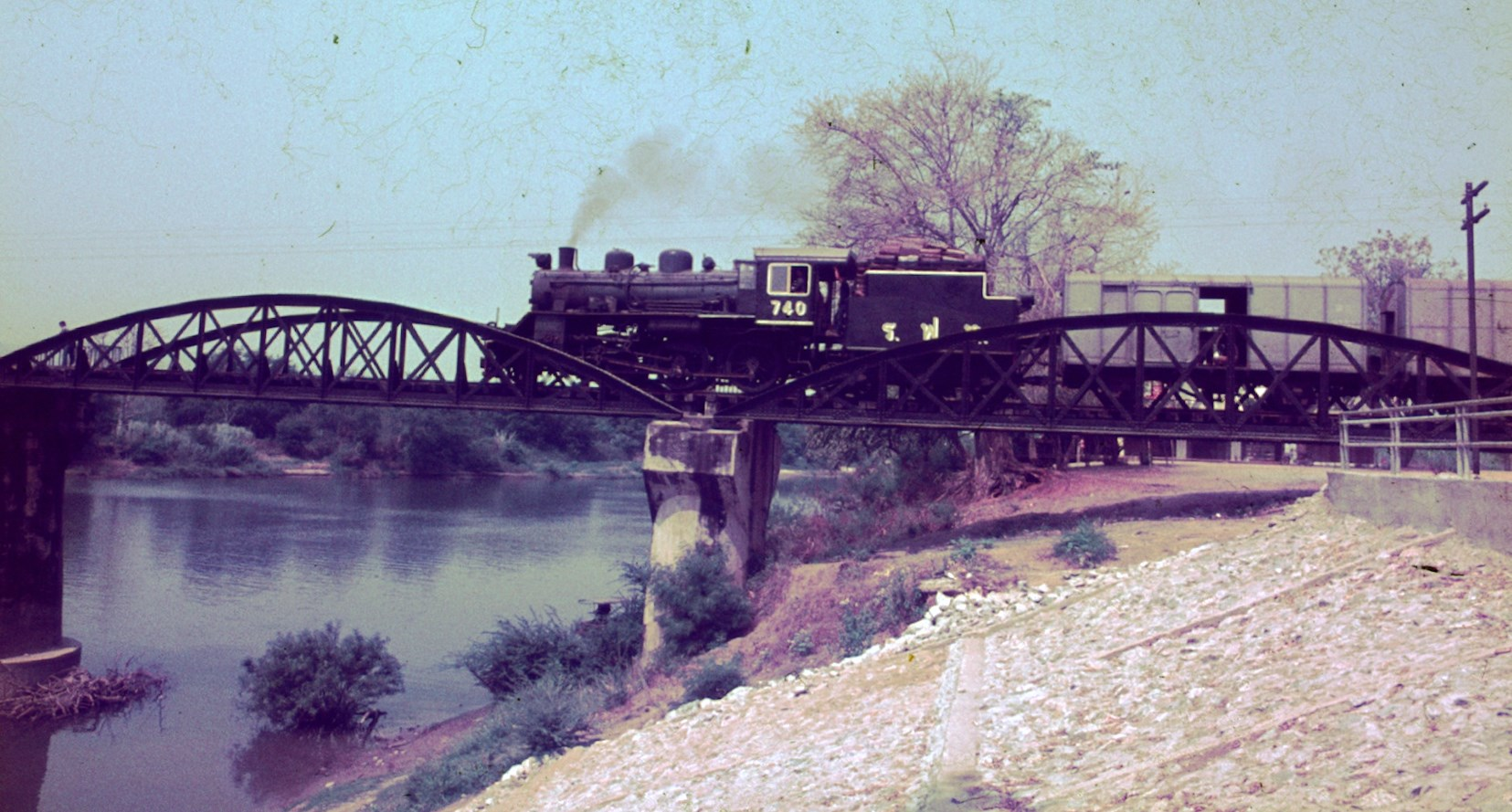
740 (C56 49), one of the C56s that remained in Thailand after the war, crossing the River Kwai Bridge

The lightweight and durable design of the C56 caught the attention of the military during the lead-up to the Second World War. In 1941, 90 of the 160 locomotives were requisitioned for service on the Thailand-Burma Railway (commonly known as the Death Railway). After the war, 46 surviving locomotives remained in Thailand and were incorporated into the State Railway of Thailand as the Class 700 (Nos. 701–746). A further 12 units were transferred to the Burma Railways, where they were designated Class C and assigned individual numbering.

=== Post-War operations in Japan ===
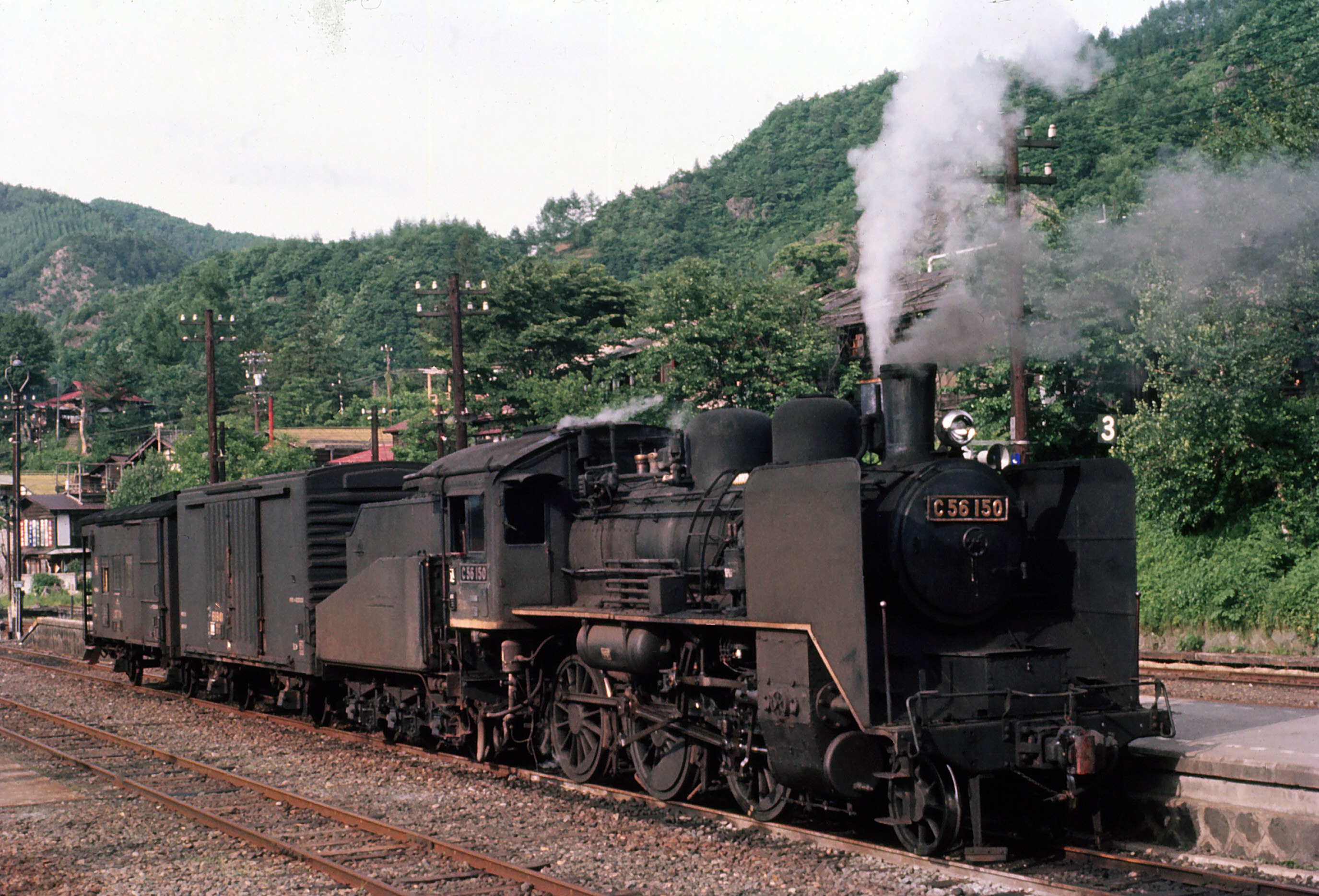
C56 150, one of the 'Ponies of the Highlands', on the Koumi Line, 1971

Of the 68 C56 locomotives that remained in Japan, many were redeployed across regions such as Hokuriku, Kyushu, and the Chugoku area, and operated on less-trafficked branch lines. While their limited power made them unsuitable for express passenger services, they handled local or mixed trains. Notably, from 1953 to 1959, C56 locomotives were used on the Kisuki Line to haul the Chidori rapid service.

The C56 earned the nickname 'Pony' for its light, agile operation, especially during its scenic runs on the Koumi Line, where it was called the 'Pony of the Highlands'. Despite being gradually replaced by diesel locomotives, the C56 continued to operate freight trains on minor lines well into the 1970s, partly due to delays in introducing dedicated diesel replacements such as the DD16. The final C56 in regular service was retired in 1974 after operating on the Sanko Line.

== Preserved examples ==
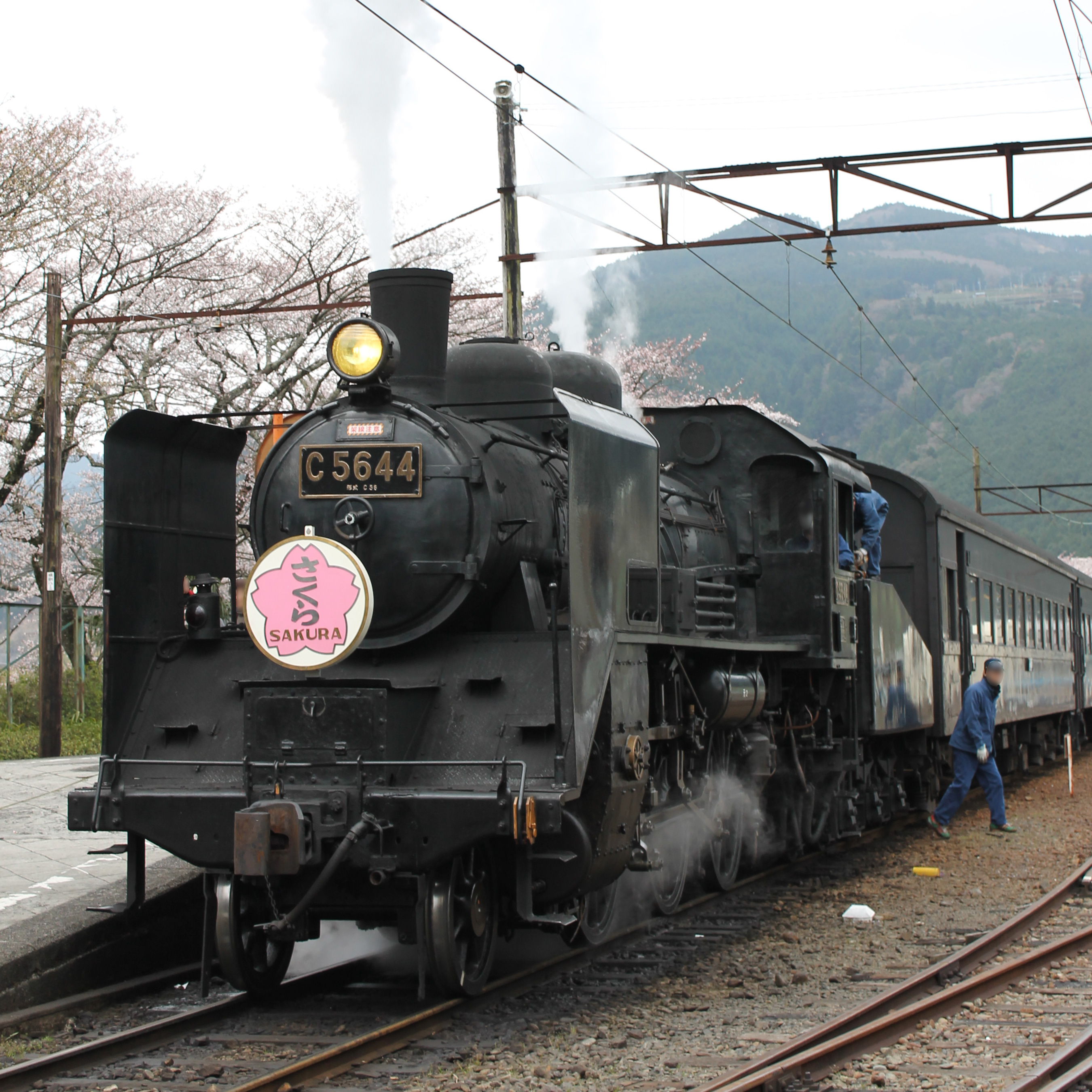
C56 44 in April 2012

A number of Class C56 locomotives are preserved in Japan and Thailand as well as one in Myanmar. C56 44 is maintained in operating condition by the Ōigawa Railway for use on main line steam specials, while the railway is planning to restore another C56 to an operational condition. In 2015, C56 44 was repainted as James for Day Out with Thomas events. C56 160 was mainline operational until 2018, when the limited space on the locomotive made it difficult for it to be fitted with the latest digital automatic train stop system. Since then, the locomotive remains operational at the Kyoto Railway Museum but does not operate on mainlines. In Thailand, Nos. 713 and 715 (formerly C56 Nos. 15 and 17) remain operational.

=== Myanmar ===
- C56 56: Burma Railway. (Burma Railway No. C-0522) Preserved at Death Railway Museum, Thanbyuzayat, Myanmar.
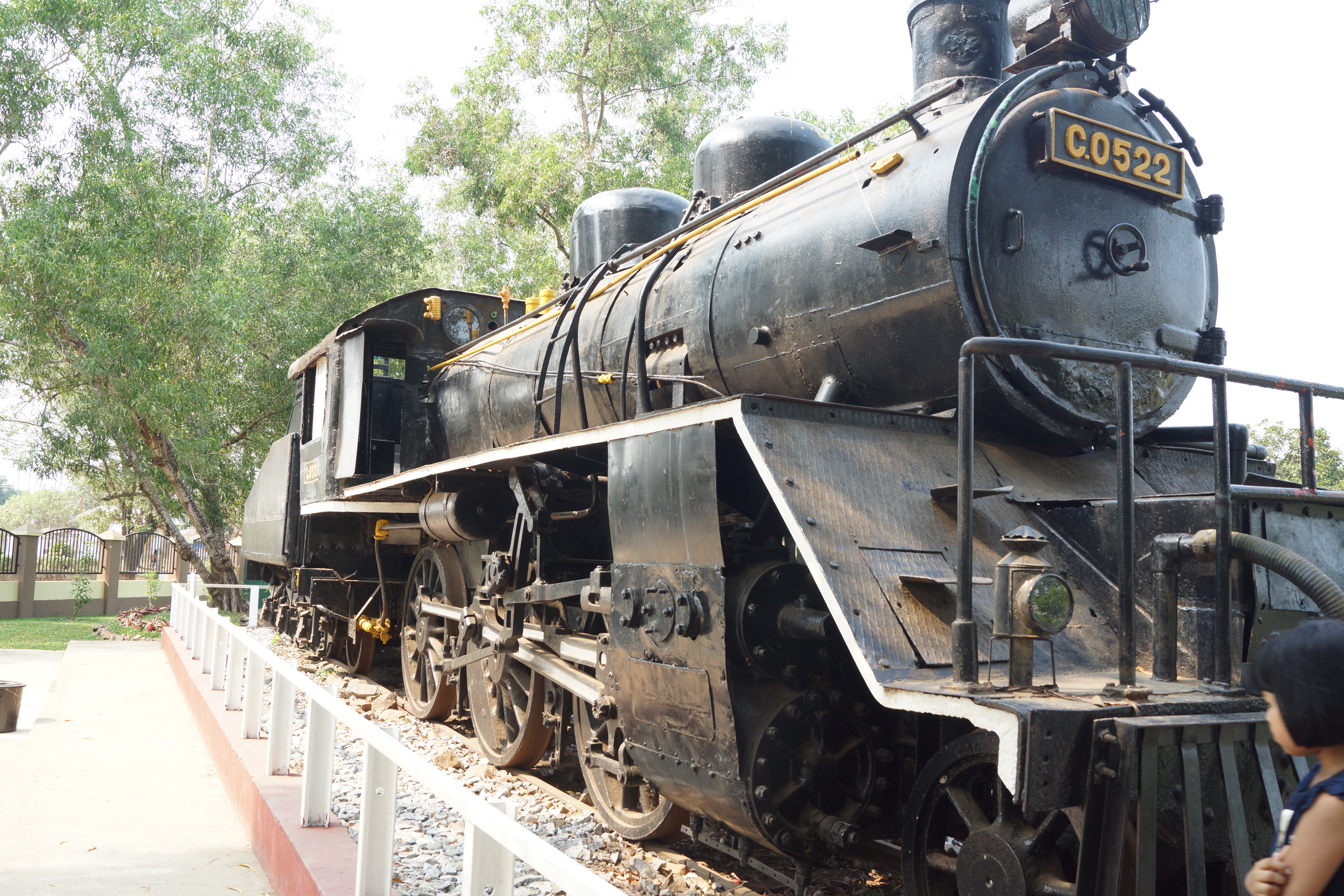
C56 56 in Myanmar

=== Thailand ===
- C56 4: State Railway of Thailand. (SRT 702) Preserved at Sai Yok Noi Waterfall, Kanchanaburi.
- C56 15: State Railway of Thailand. (SRT 713) Preserved for haul the special steam train for show in River Kwai Festival at Kanchanaburi between late November and/or early December.
- C56 16: State Railway of Thailand. (SRT 714) Preserved at Bangkok Railway Station.
- C56 17: State Railway of Thailand. (SRT 715) Preserved for haul the special steam train for show in River Kwai Festival at Kanchanaburi between late November and/or early December. (The alternate locomotive if C56 15 out of service)
- C56 23: State Railway of Thailand. (SRT 719) Preserved at River Kwai Bridge, Kanchanaburi
- C56 36: State Railway of Thailand. (SRT 728) Preserved at Lampang Railway Station.
- C56 41: State Railway of Thailand. (SRT 733) Stored at Makkasan Depot, Bangkok.
- C56 47: State Railway of Thailand. (SRT 738) Preserved at Thai Film Archive, Salaya, Nakhon Pathom.
- C56 53: State Railway of Thailand. (SRT 744) Private property, near the Road 1269 in Chiang Mai
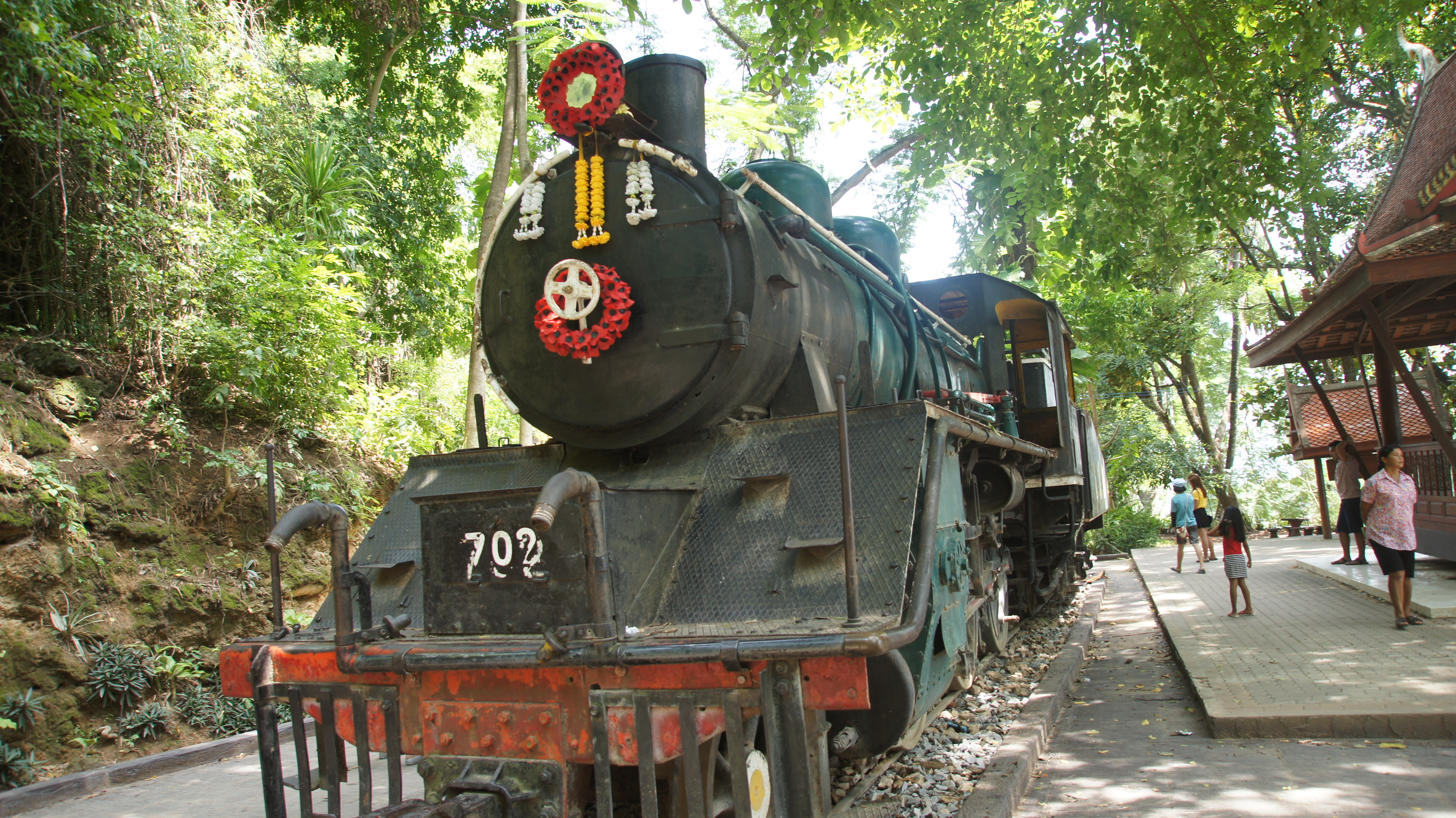
C56 4 steam locomotive at Nam Tok Sai Yok Noi

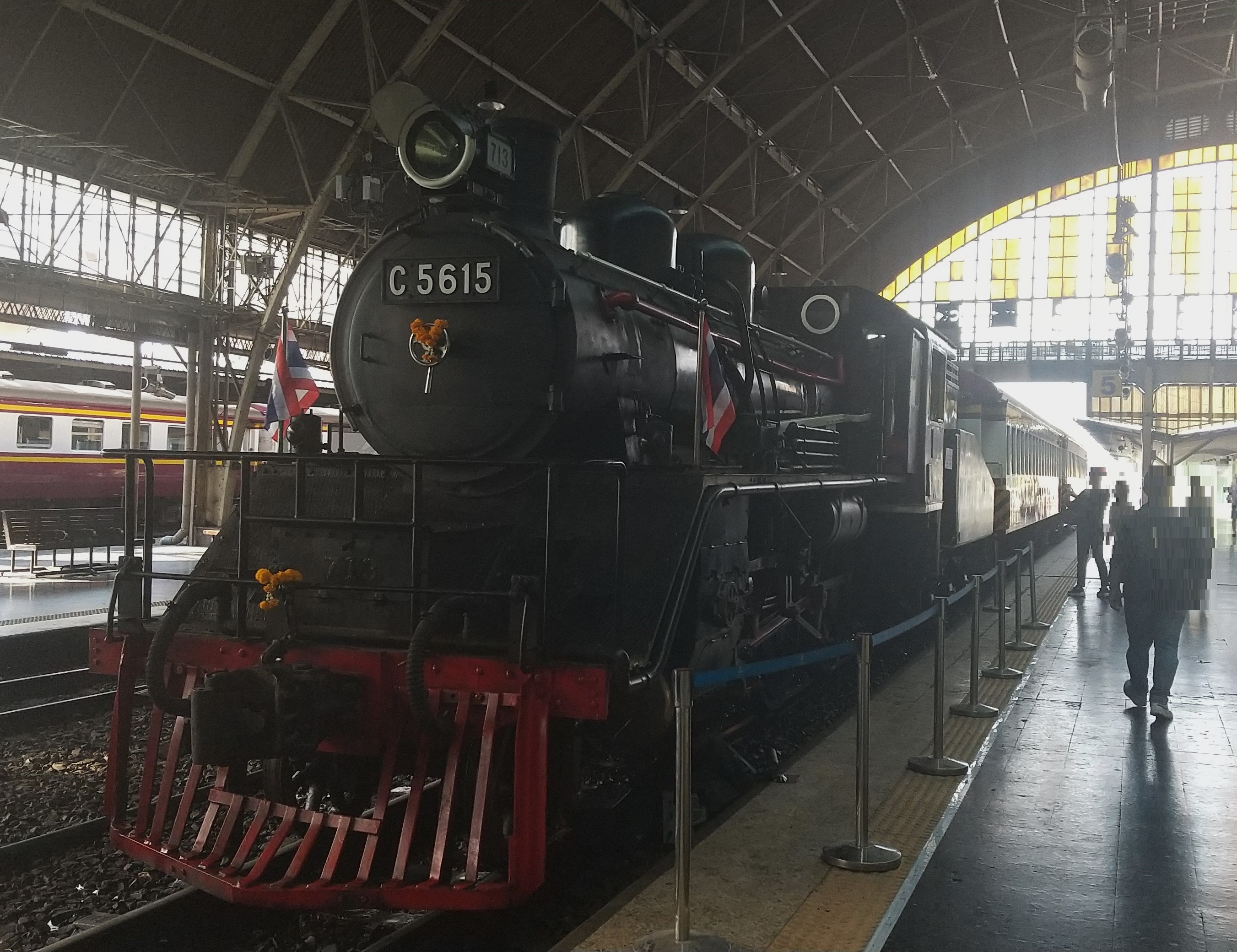
C56 15 in Bangkok Railway Station, Bangkok

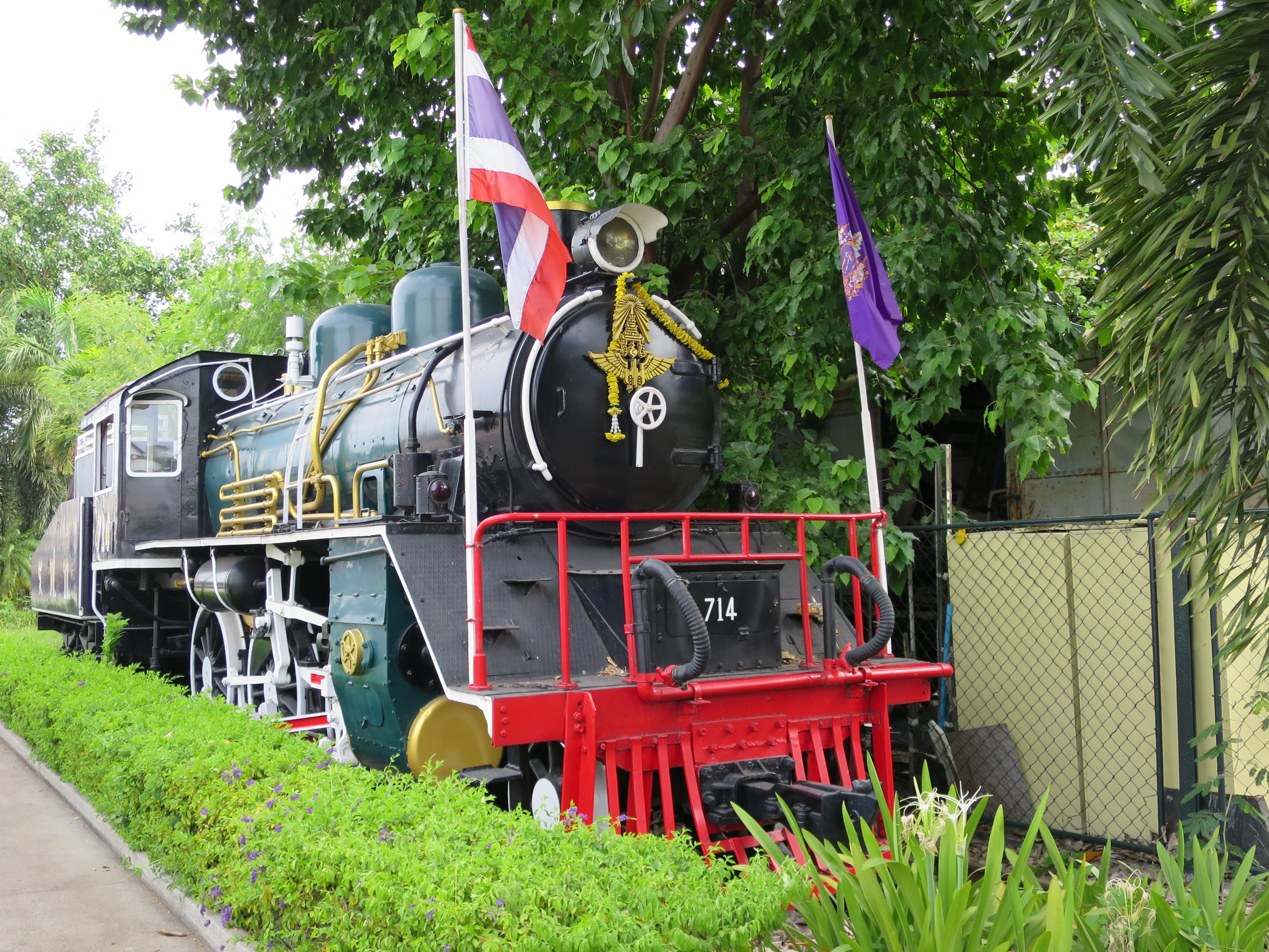
C56 16

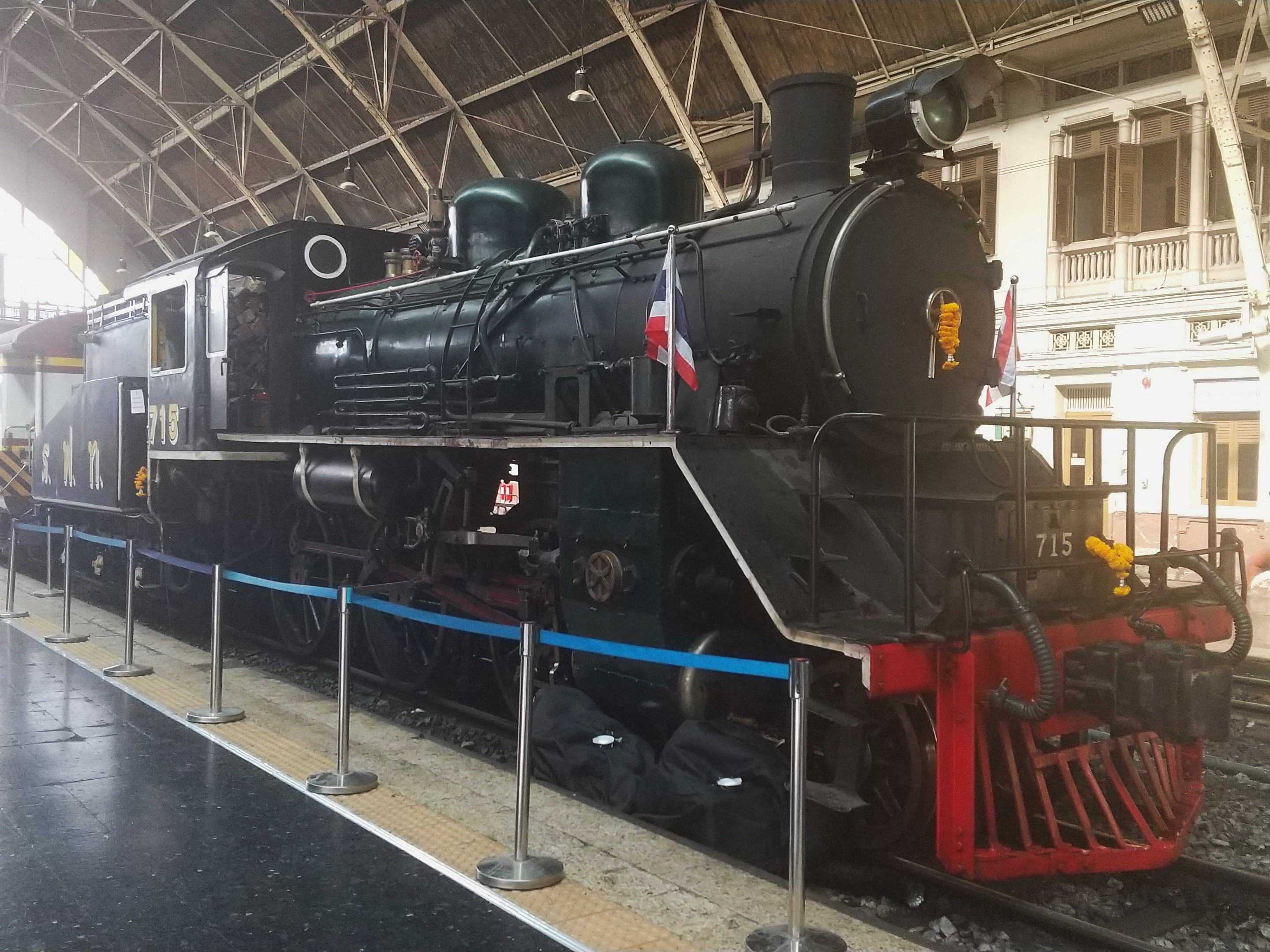
C56 17 in Bangkok Railway Station, Bangkok

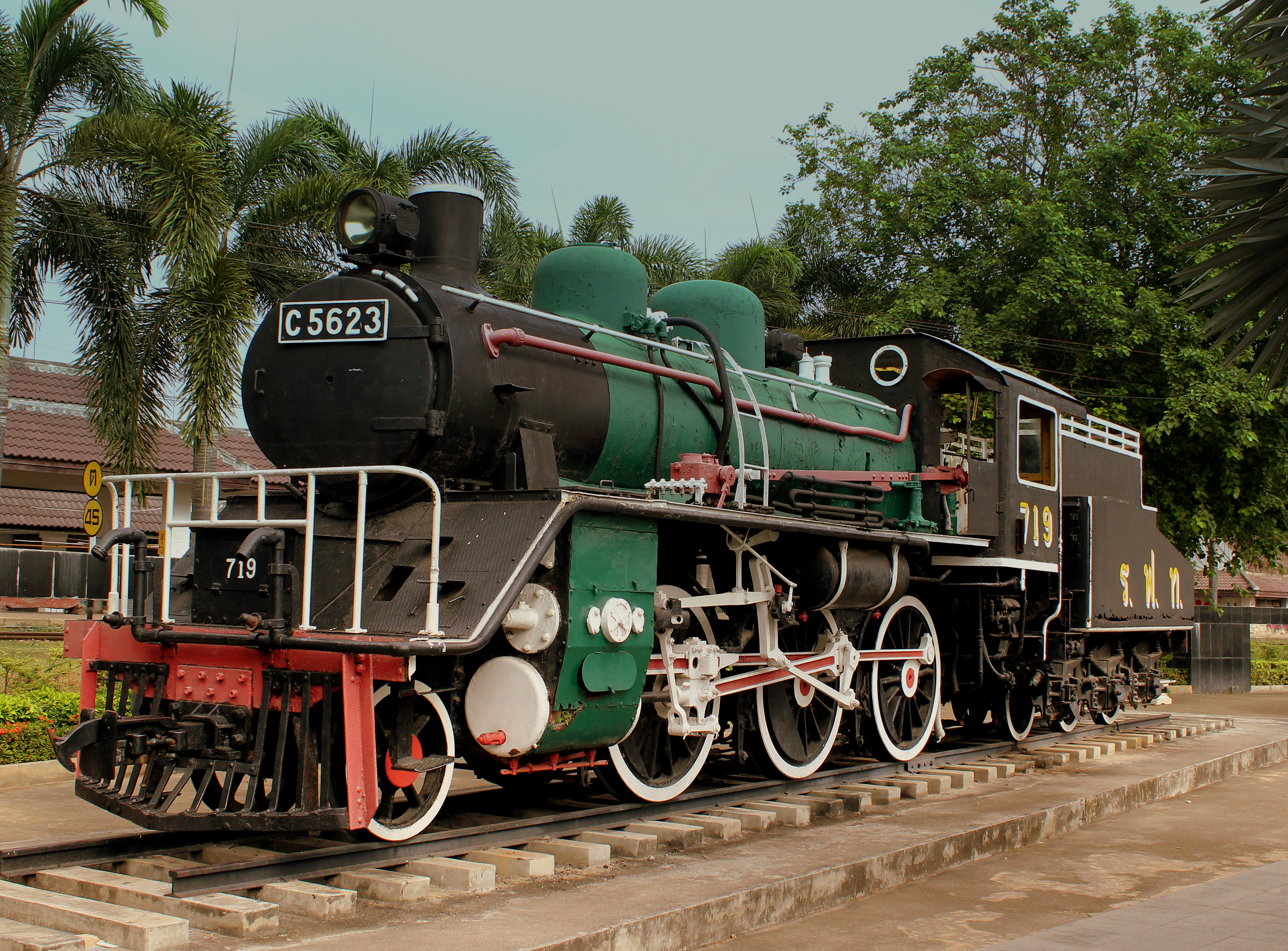
C56 23 in River Kwai Bridge, Kanchanaburi

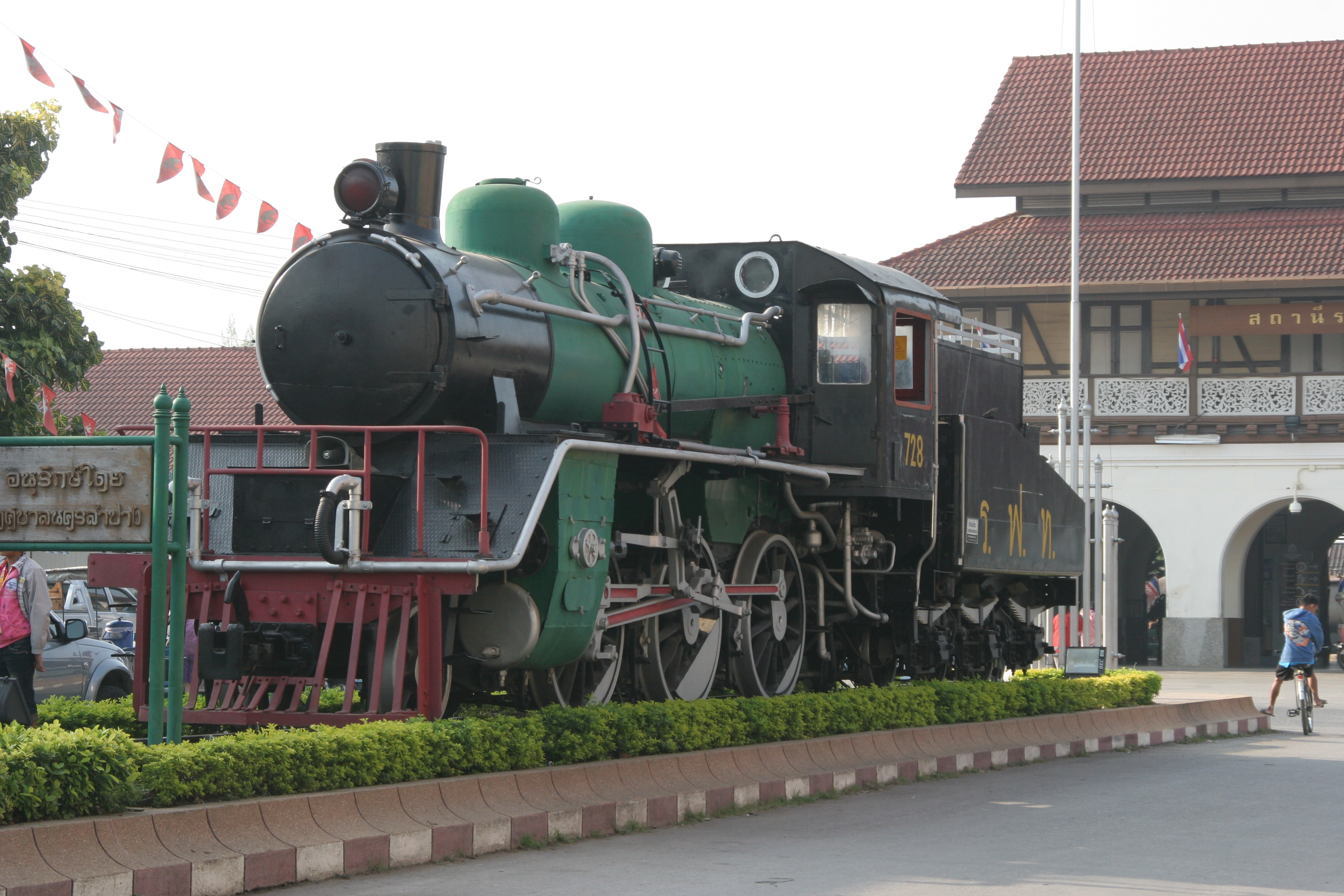
C56 36 in Lampang Railway Station, Lampang

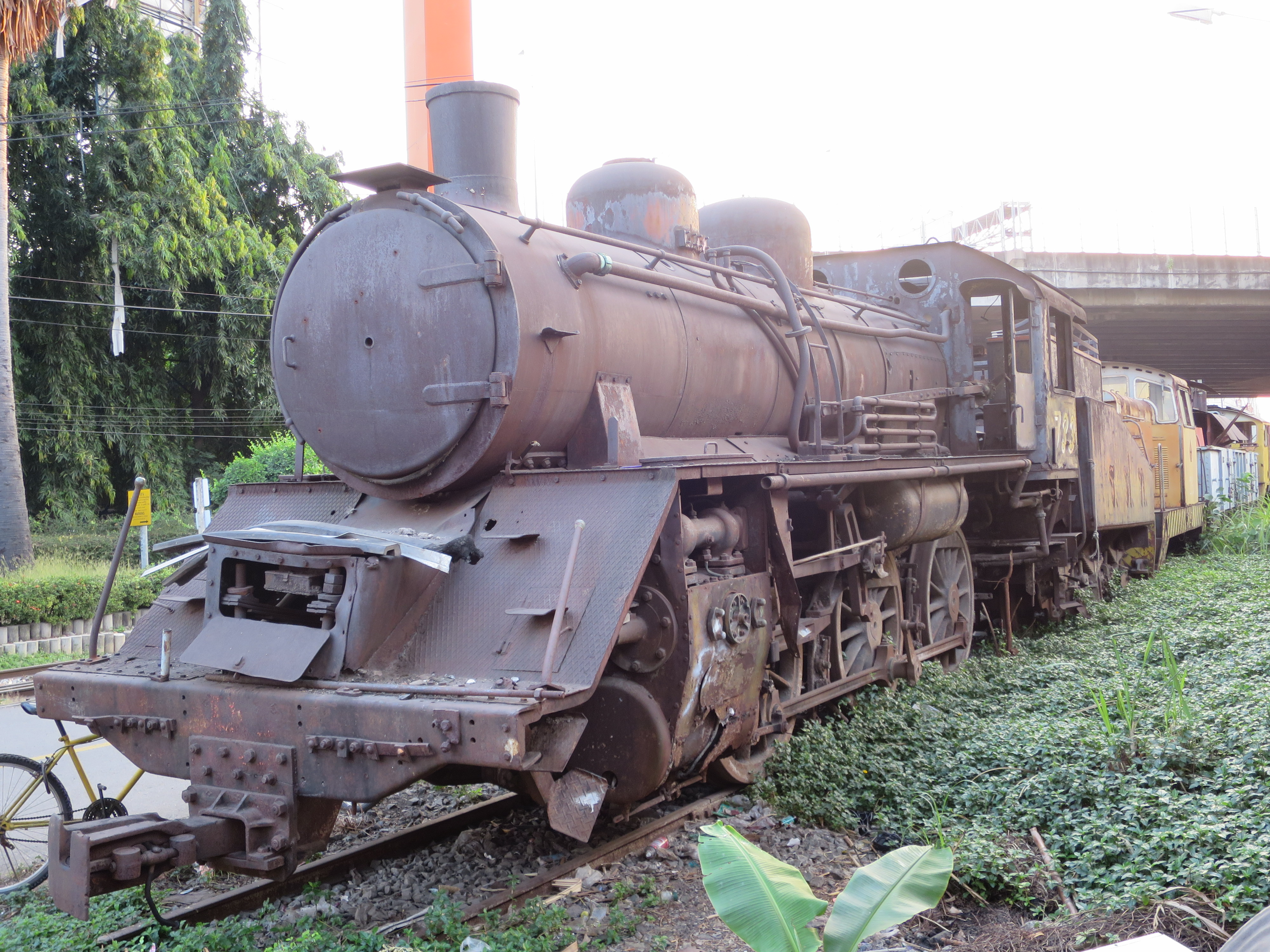
C56 41 at Makkasan Depot, Bangkok

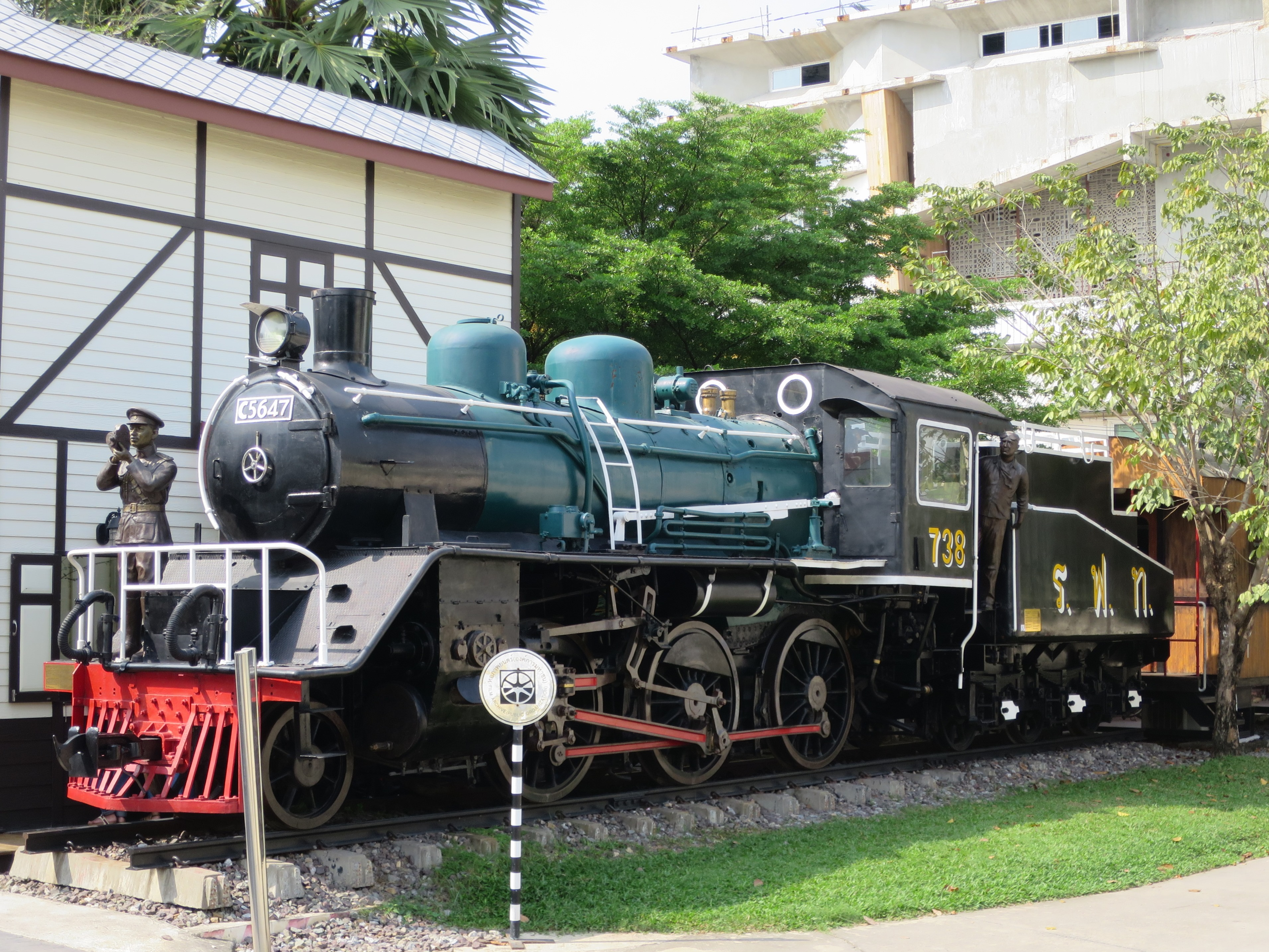
C56 47 in Thai Film Archive, Salaya, Nakhon Pathom

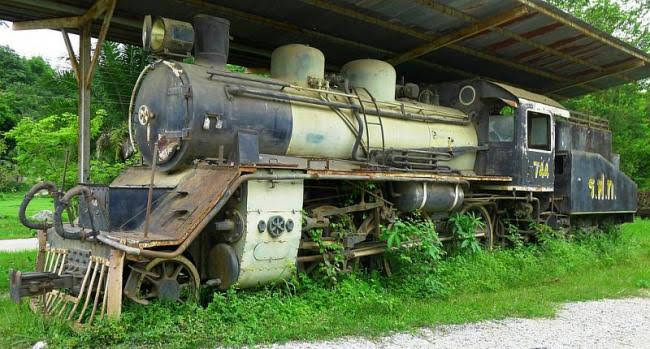
C56 53

=== Japan ===
- C56 31: Yūshūkan (SRT 725) Japanese military and war museum. Used in Burma and Thailand during the construction of the Death Railway and subsequently used in Thailand after the war. It was brought back to Japan in the 1970s.
- C56 44: (SRT 735) Preserved in operating condition on the Ōigawa Railway. On some occasions, this locomotive will be dressed as James the Red Engine to pull special Day Out with Thomas special events with C11 227/C11 190 (Thomas)
- C56 92: Preserved in front of Izumi Station in Kagoshima Prefecture.
- C56 94: Preserved in Nishi Park in Ōmachi, Nagano.
- C56 96: Preserved in Minamimaki, Nagano.
- C56 98: Preserved in the 19th Century Hall next to Torokko Saga Station in Kyoto.
- C56 99: Preserved at the Dacho Dream Eco Land in Satsumasendai, Kagoshima.
- C56 101: Preserved in a park in Saku, Nagano.
- C56 106: Preserved in a park in Fuchu, Hiroshima.
- C56 108: Preserved in Unnan, Shimane.
- C56 110: Preserved in a park in Soka, Saitama.
- C56 111: Preserved at an elementary school in Takarazuka, Hyōgo.
- C56 124: Preserved at a community centre in Azumino, Nagano.
- C56 126: Preserved at Kobuchizawa Elementary School in Hokuto, Yamanashi.
- C56 129: Preserved in a park in Iiyama, Nagano.
- C56 131: Preserved in Kita Park in Matsue, Shimane.
- C56 135: Preserved in a park in Kato, Hyogo. Purchased by the Ōigawa Railway through crowdfunding, undergoing restoration as of October 2024.
- C56 139: Preserved at Yokohama Hommoku Freight Terminal on the Kanagawa Rinkai Railway in Yokohama, Kanagawa.
- C56 144: Preserved at Komoro Castle in Komoro, Nagano.
- C56 149: Preserved in front of Kiyosato Station in Hokuto, Yamanashi.
- C56 150: Preserved at the Hakuba Alps Autocamp site in Hakuba, Nagano.
- C56 160: Preserved in operating condition by JR West at Kyoto Railway Museum. It was withdrawn from mainline service on 27th May 2018 due to being severely underpowered for excursions, requiring assistance from a diesel locomotive in order to haul a full 5-car consist of 35 series carriages for the SL Yamaguchi.
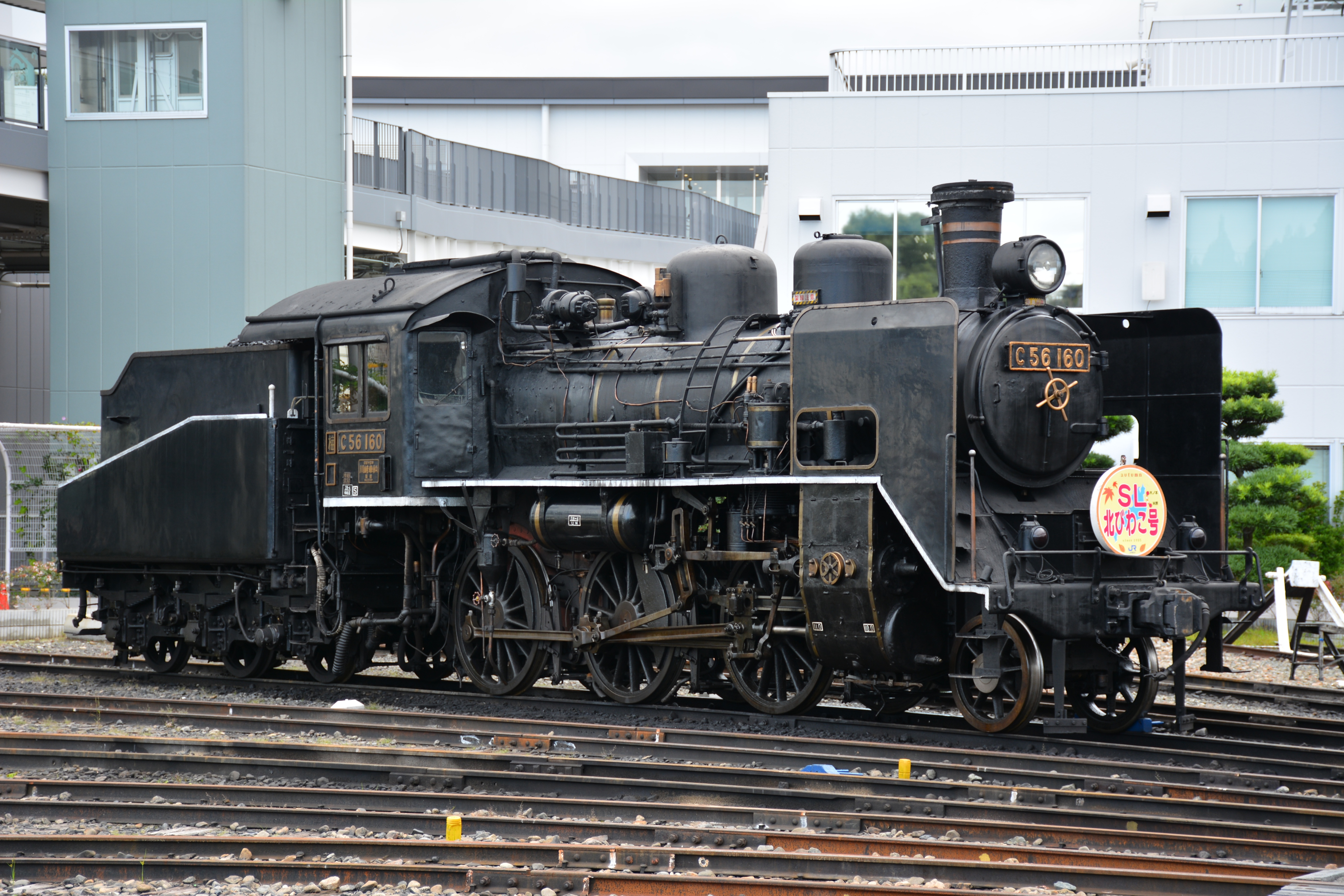
C56 160 steam locomotive at Kyoto Railway Museum

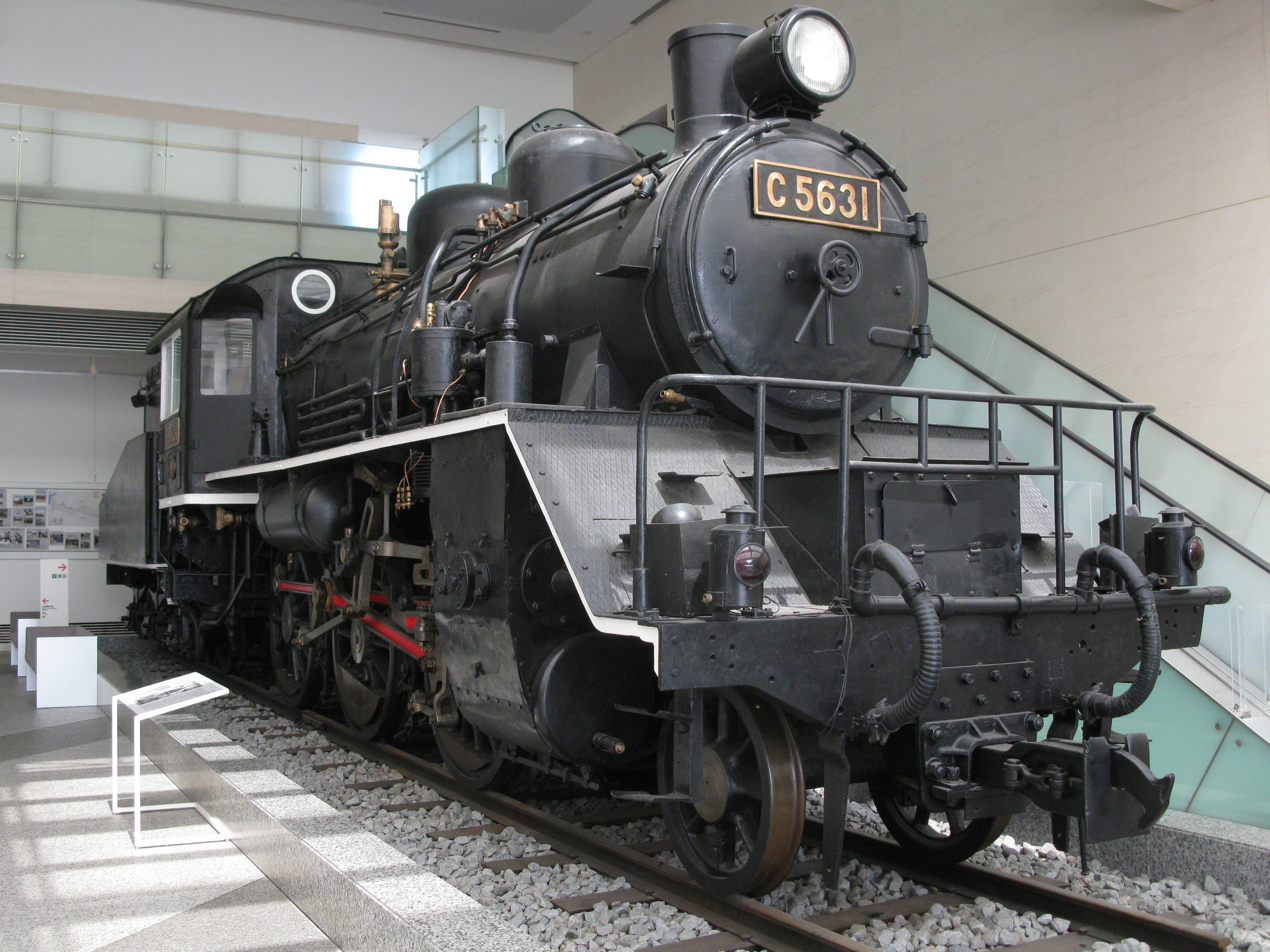
C56 31 preserved inside the Yushukan Museum in Tokyo

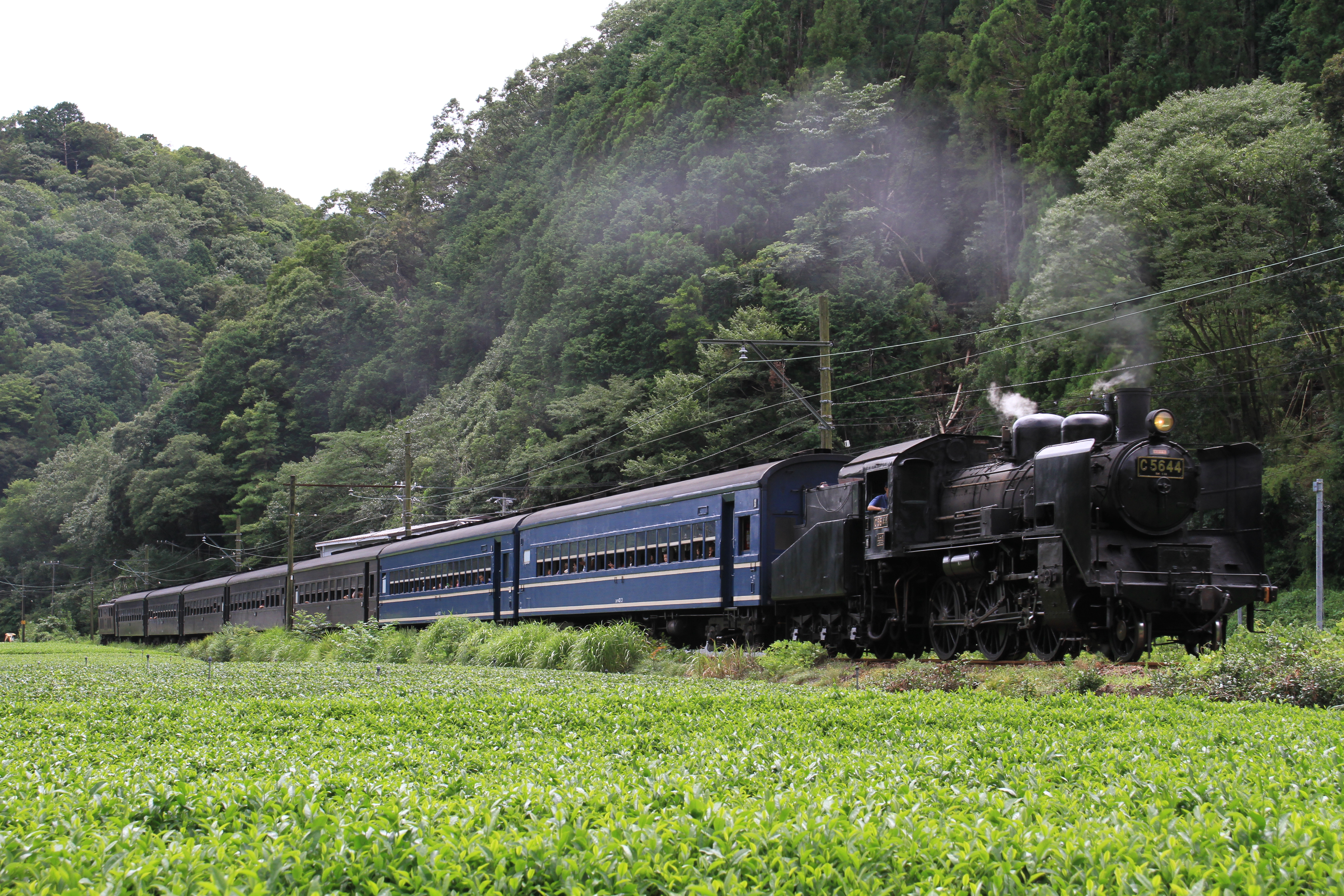
C56 44 operating on the Oigawa Railway in August 2012

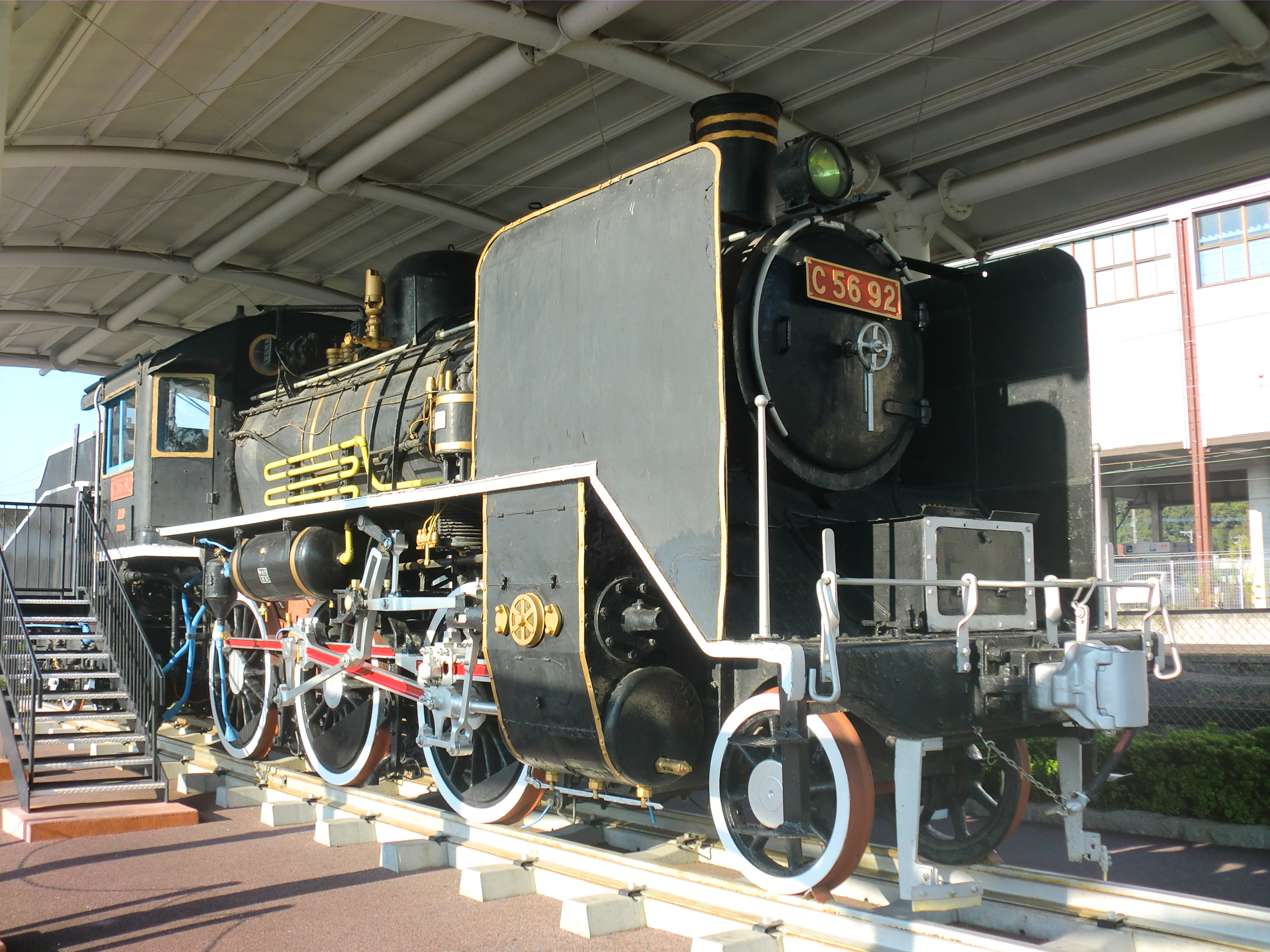
Preserved C56 92 in October 2012

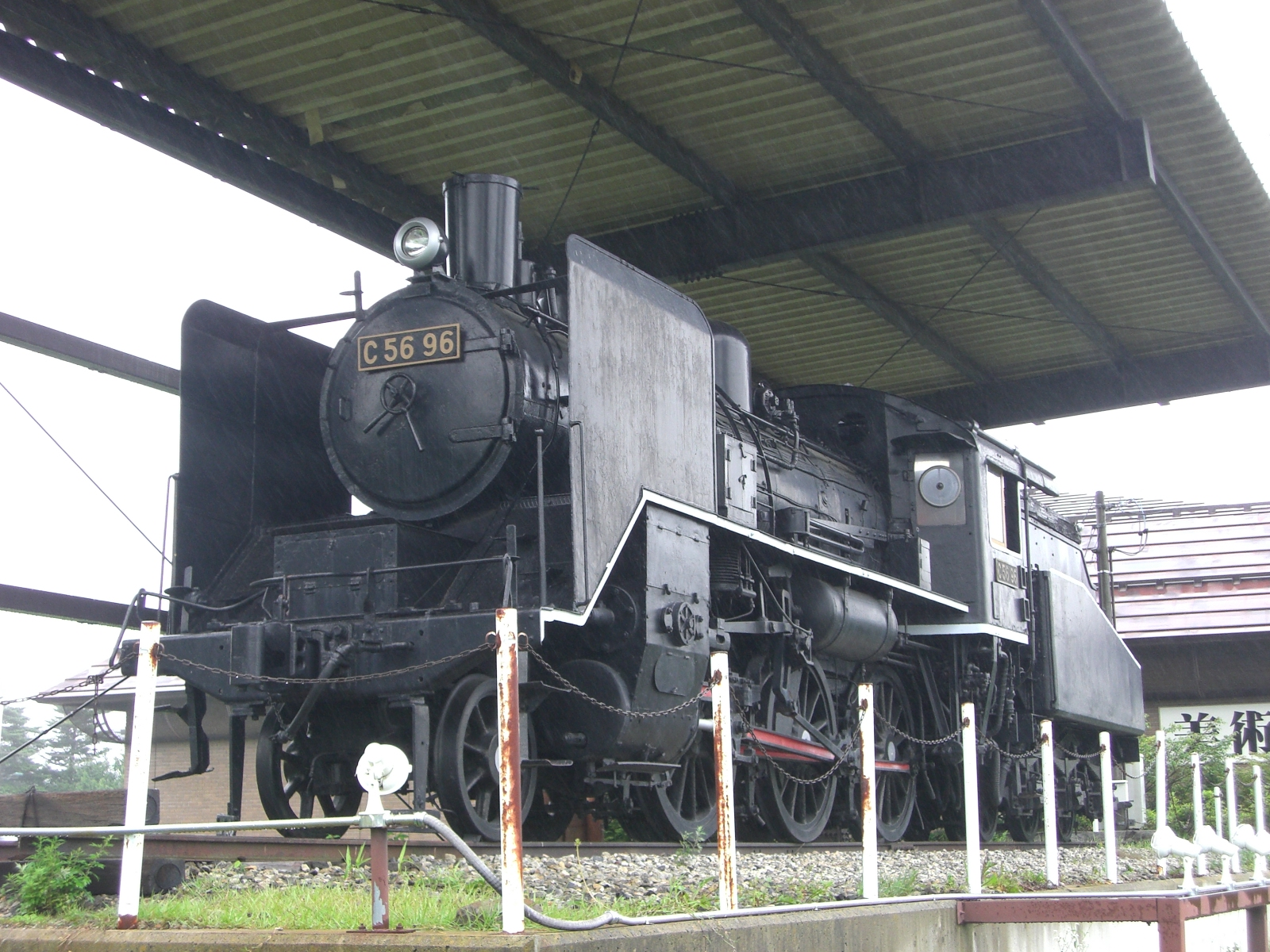
Preserved C56 96 in August 2009

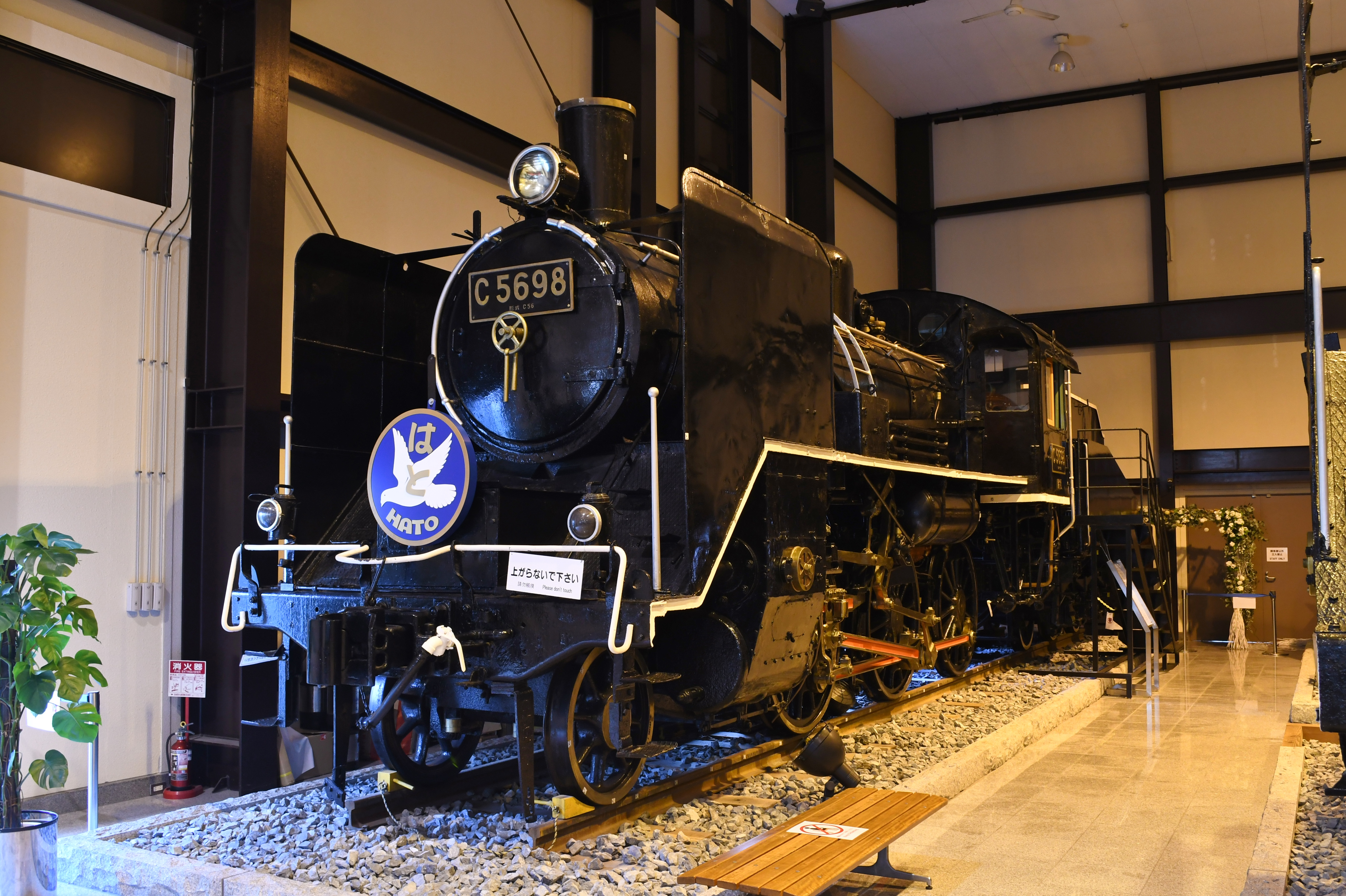
Preserved C56 98 in March 2021

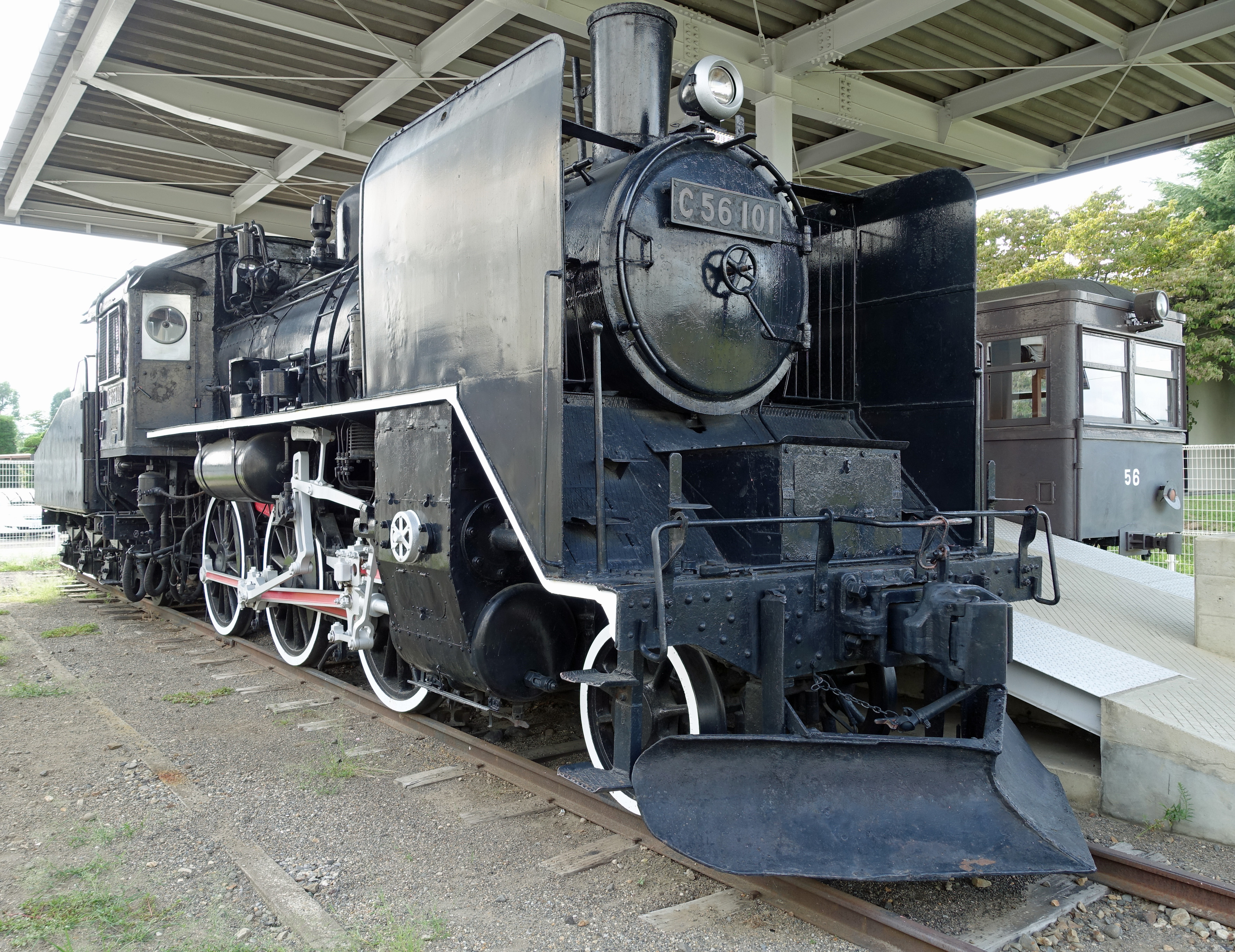
Preserved C56 101 in August 2015

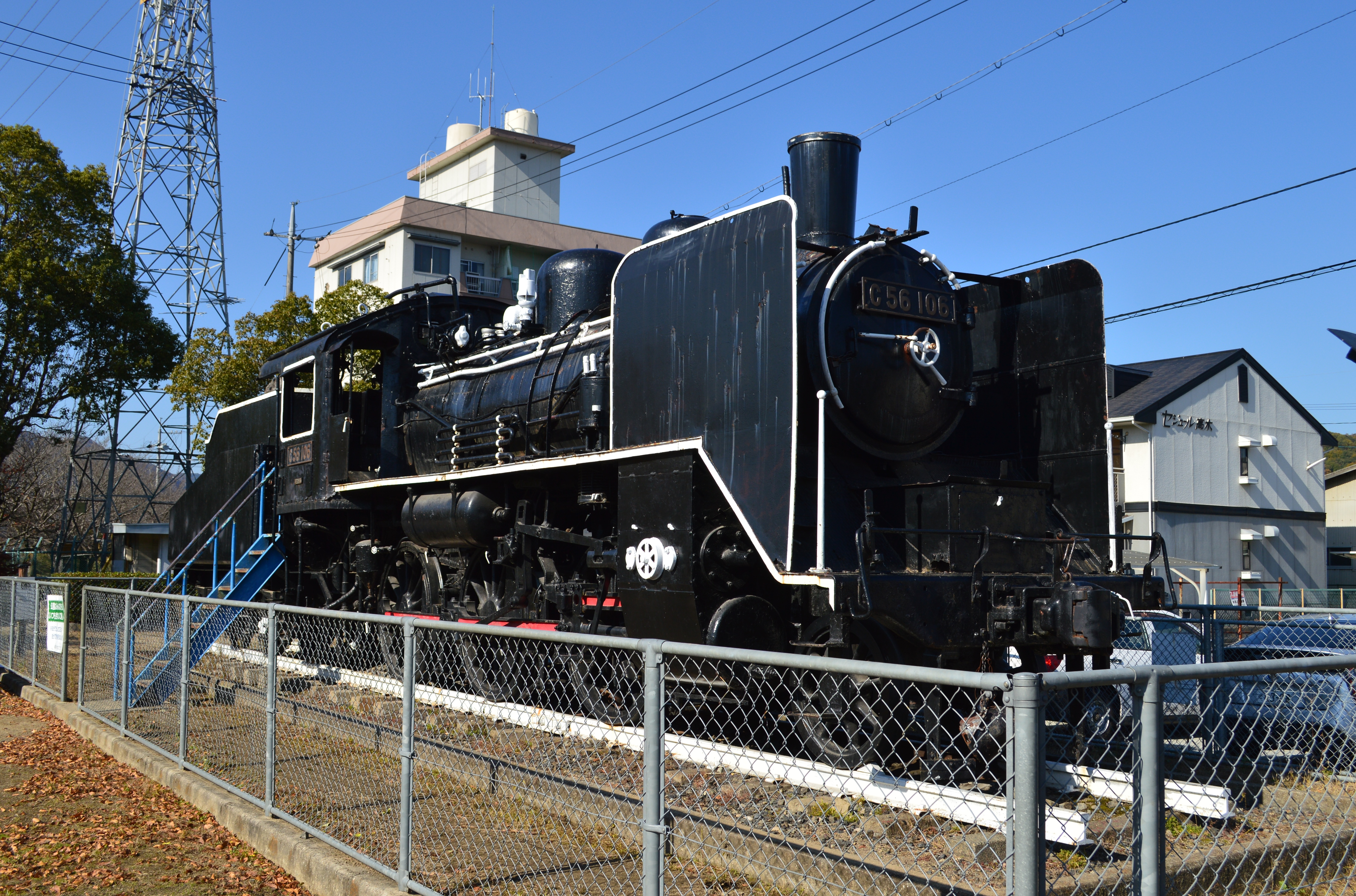
Preserved C56 106 in November 2020

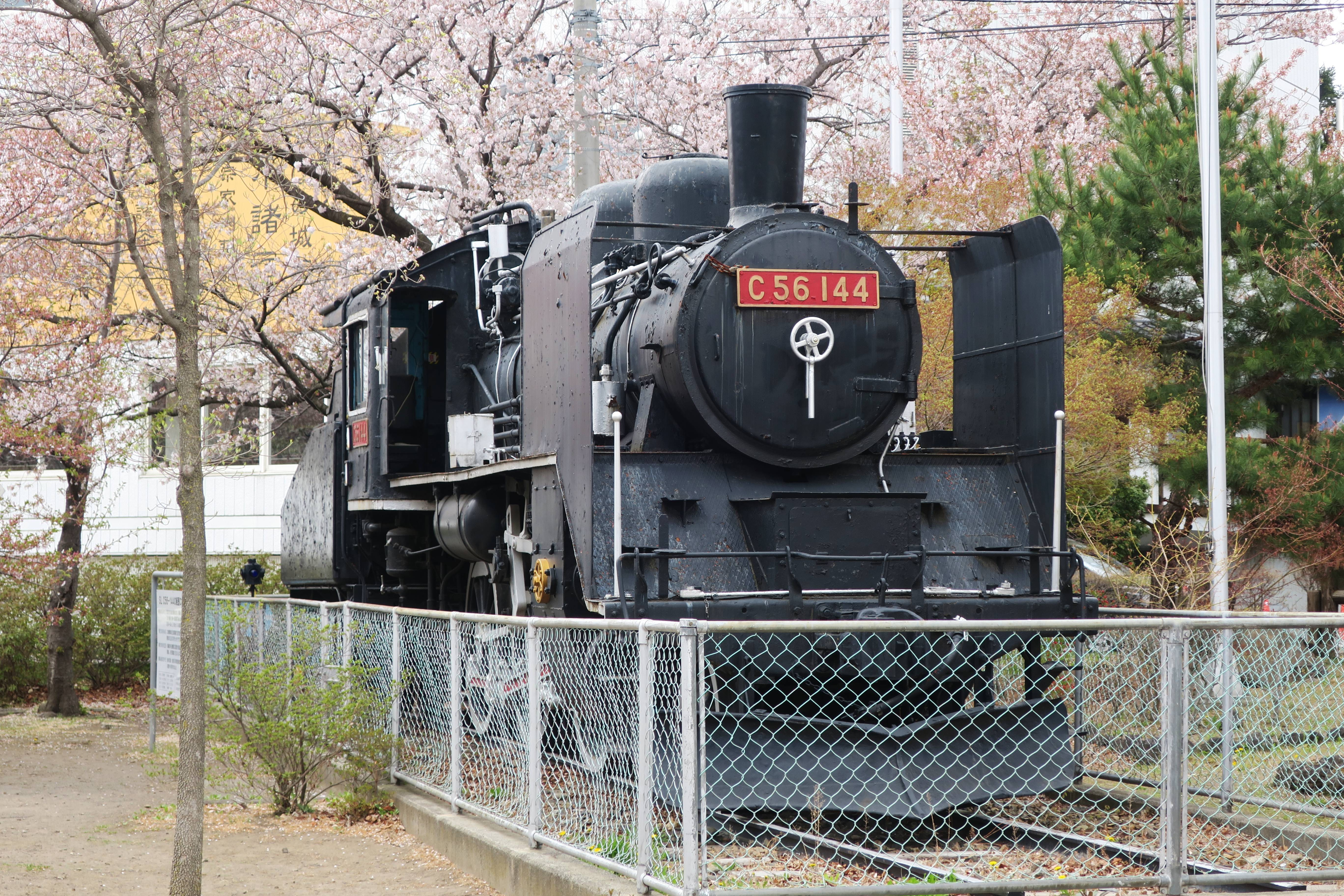
Preserved C56 144 in April 2018

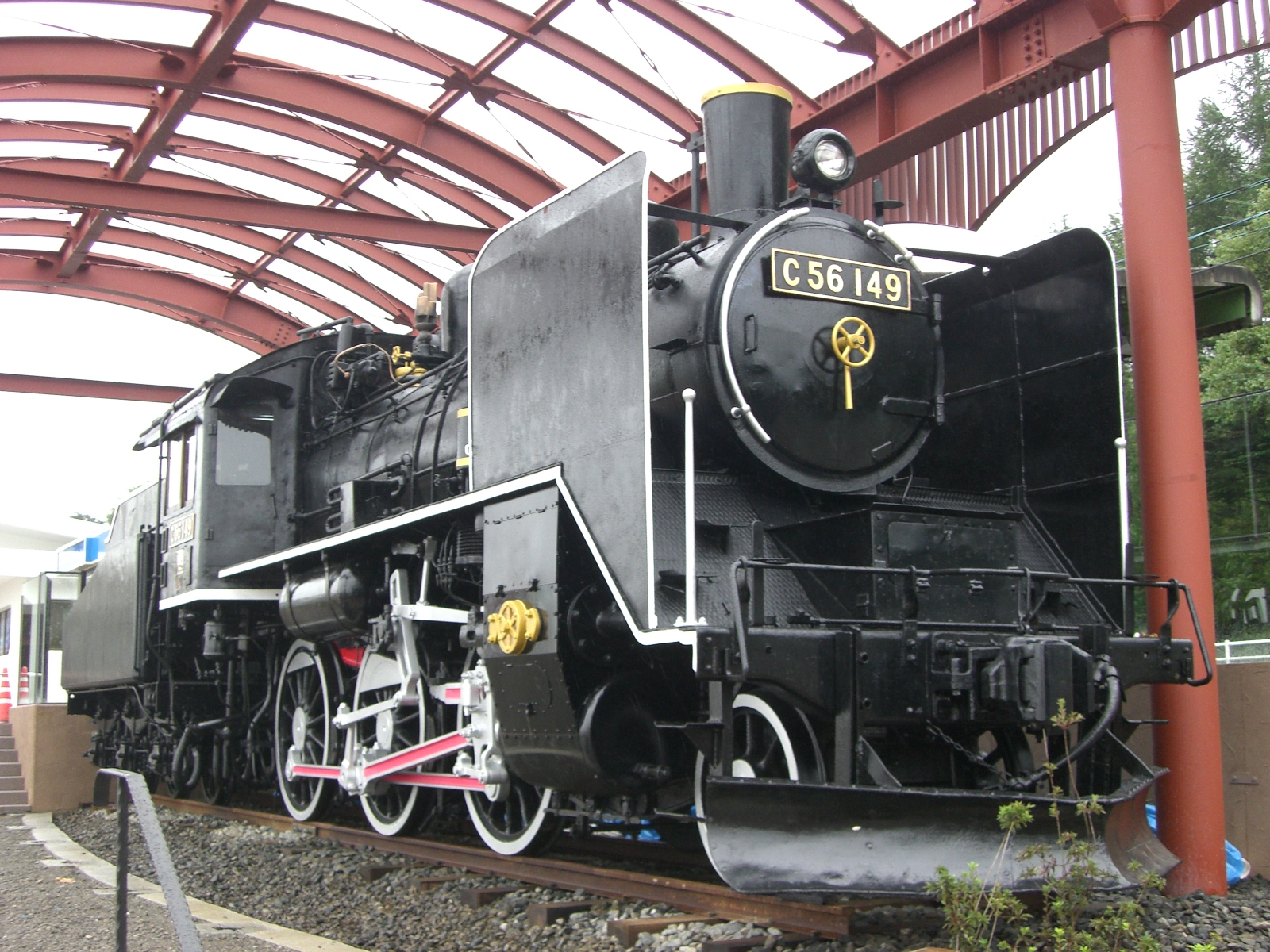
Preserved C56 149 in August 2009

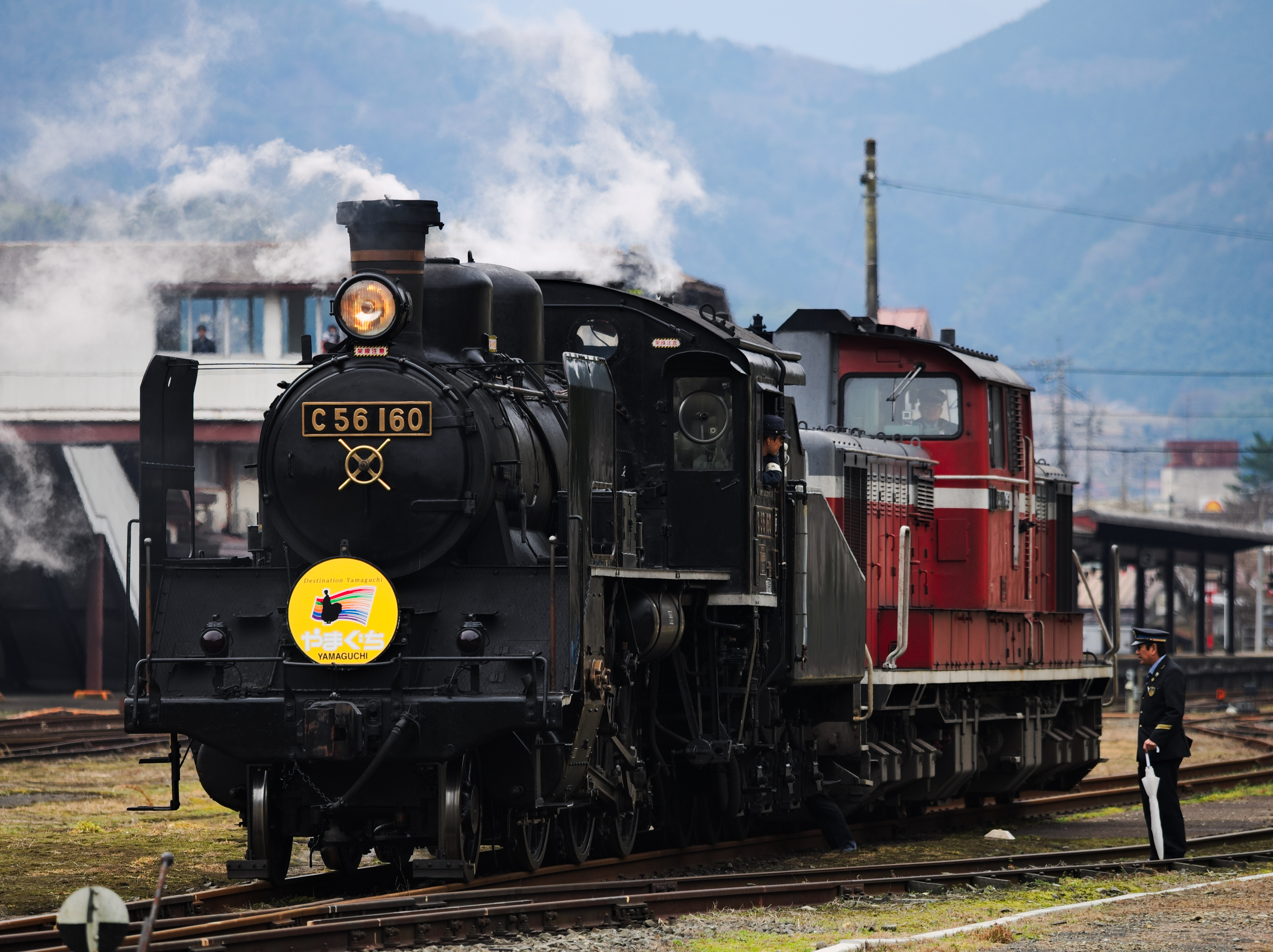
C56 160 at Tsuwano Station in December 2017

== See also ==
- Japan Railways locomotive numbering and classification
- List of operational steam locomotives in Japan
- JNR Class C10
- JNR Class C11
- JNR Class C12
