= Yūshūkan =

Coordinates: 35°41′43″N 139°44′36″E

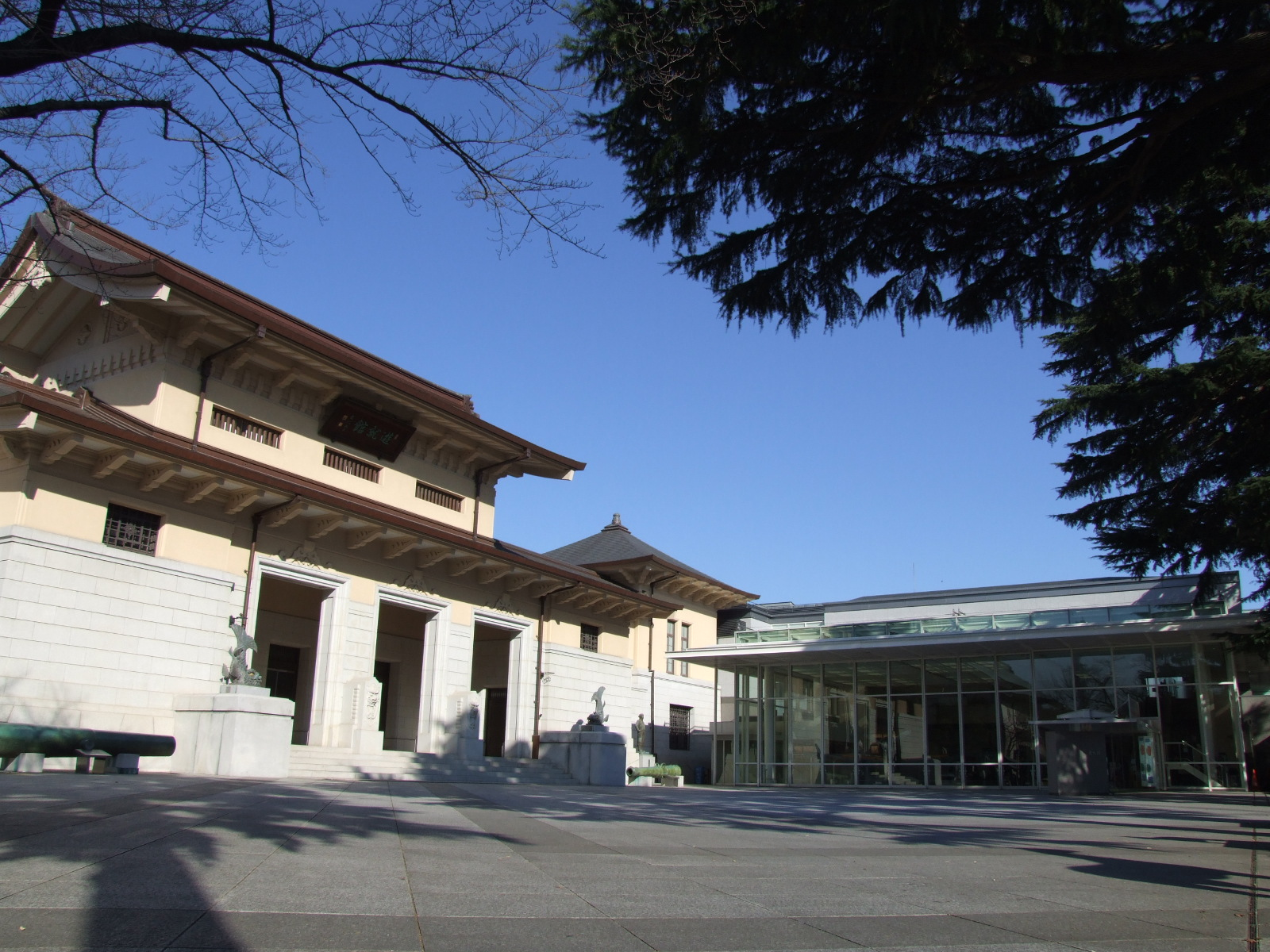
- Established: 1882
- Location: Kudankita, Chiyoda, Tokyo, Japan
- Type: Military and war museum
- Website: yasukuni.or.jp/yushukan

The Yūshūkan (遊就館; lit. 'Place to commune with noble souls') is a Japanese military and war museum located within Yasukuni Shrine in Chiyoda, Tokyo. As a museum maintained by the shrine, which is dedicated to the souls of soldiers who died fighting on behalf of the Emperor of Japan including convicted war criminals, the museum contains various artifacts and documents concerning Japanese soldiers and military activity from the start of the Meiji Restoration to the end of World War II. The museum was established in 1882, and describes itself as the first and oldest war and military museum in Japan. It has attracted controversy for its revisionism of Japan's wartime actions and militaristic past.

== History ==
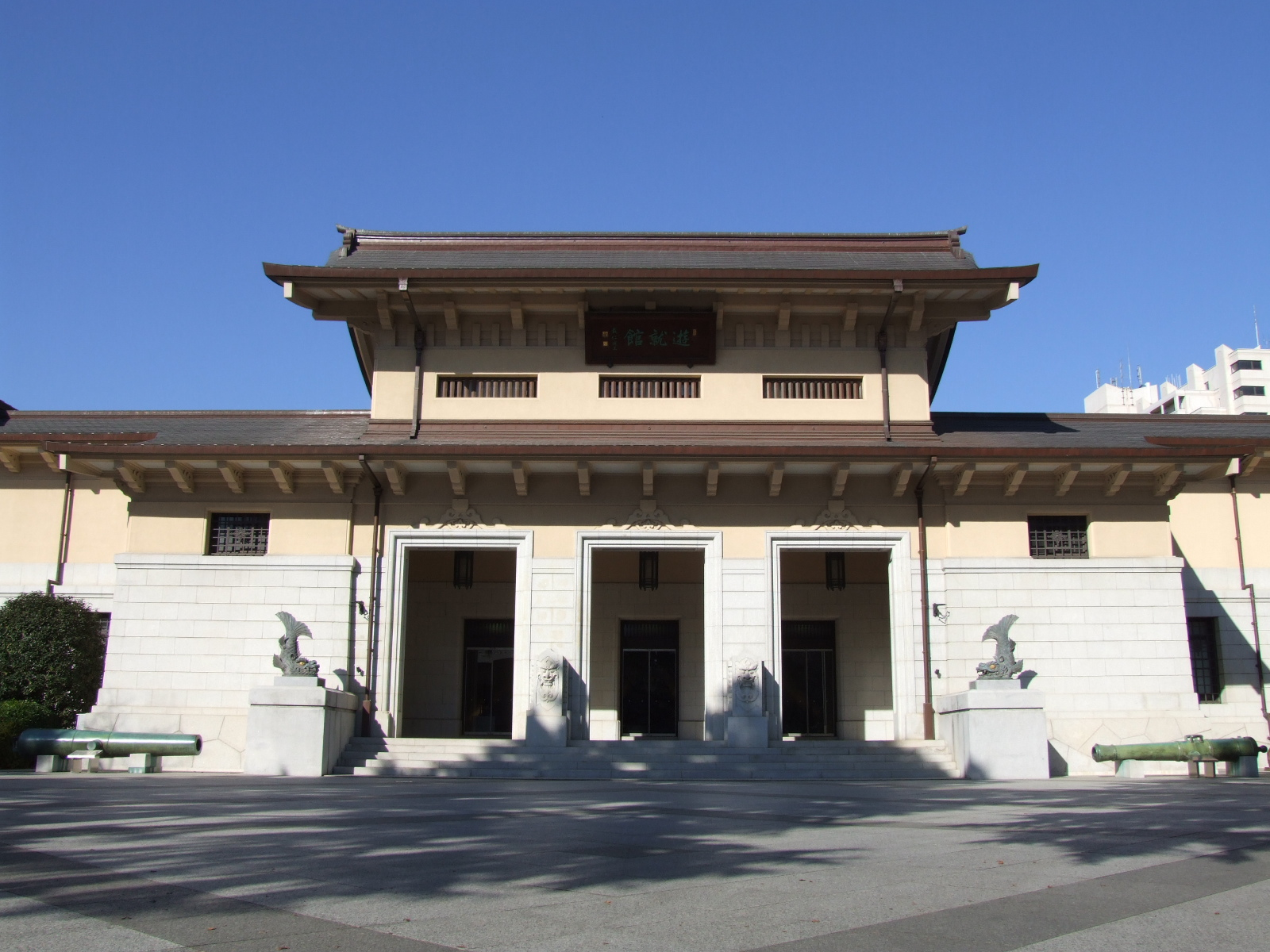
Front façade

The museum was initially established in 1882 to preserve and display Meiji Restoration-era artifacts of the Imperial Japanese Army. Following the First Sino-Japanese War and Russo-Japanese War, the Meiji Emperor issued his 192nd order in 1910, which ordered the preservation of military artifacts. The building was designed by Giovanni Cappeletti, an Italian architect, and looked like a castle.

It was expanded when the number of documents and artifacts increased, but was demolished during the 1923 Great Kantō earthquake. The structure was rebuilt by Itō Chūta, reopening in 1932.

During World War II, looted weaponry was also displayed on loan from the Ministry of War, but the museum itself was closed down during the postwar period. Yasukuni Shrine lost funding from the government under the Shinto Directive issued by the Occupation Authorities, and the shrine put the museum building up for rent in order to obtain funds. In November 1947 the Fukoku Mutual Life Insurance Company signed a rent agreement with the shrine and began using it as its Kudankita office. The company left the building in 1980, and it reopened as the Yūshūkan museum on July 13, 1985. The building has undergone several renovations since then, and the outdoor exhibitions were moved indoors and re-exhibited on July 13, 2002.

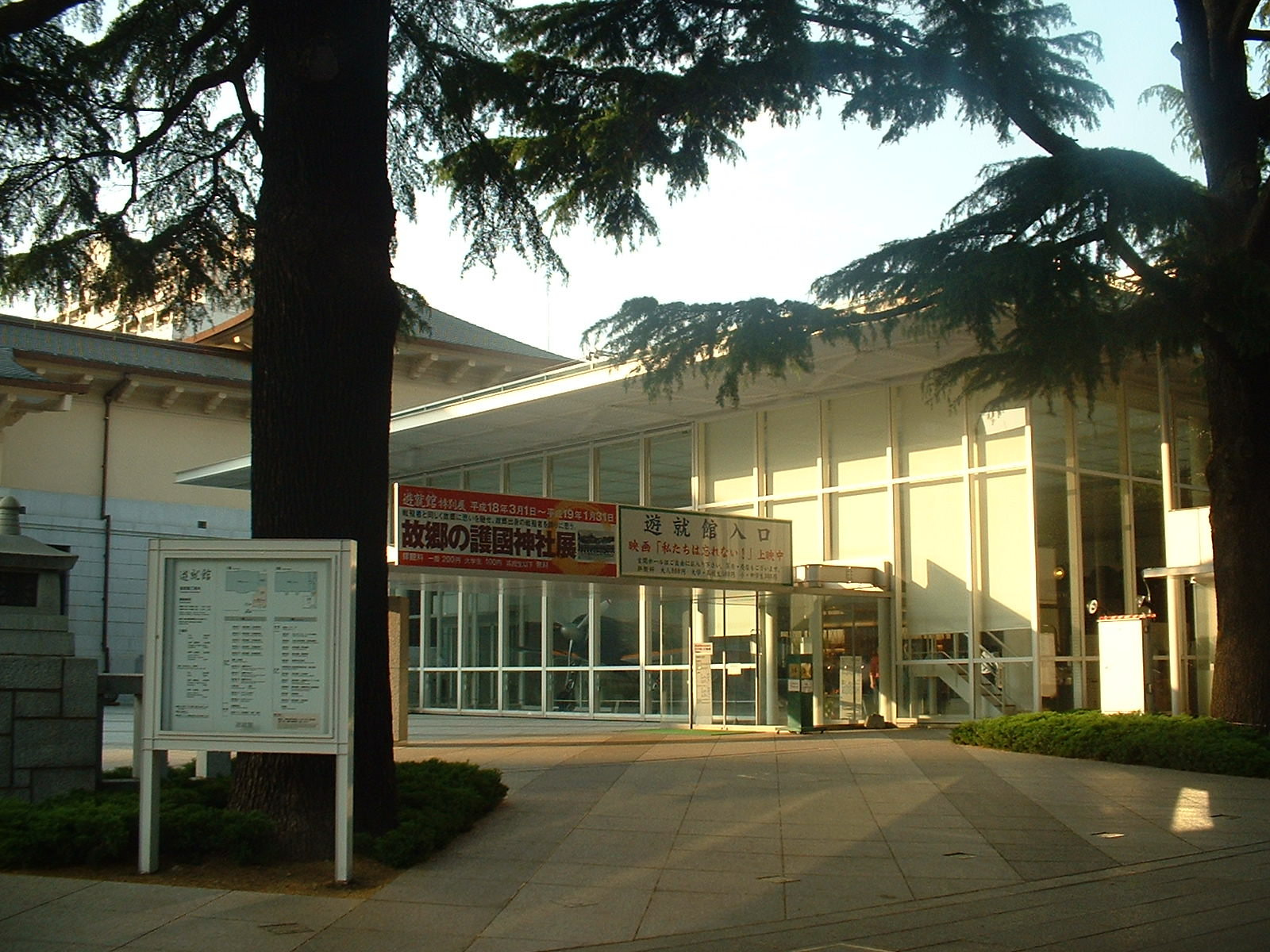
Image of the newer entrance area

== Exhibitions ==
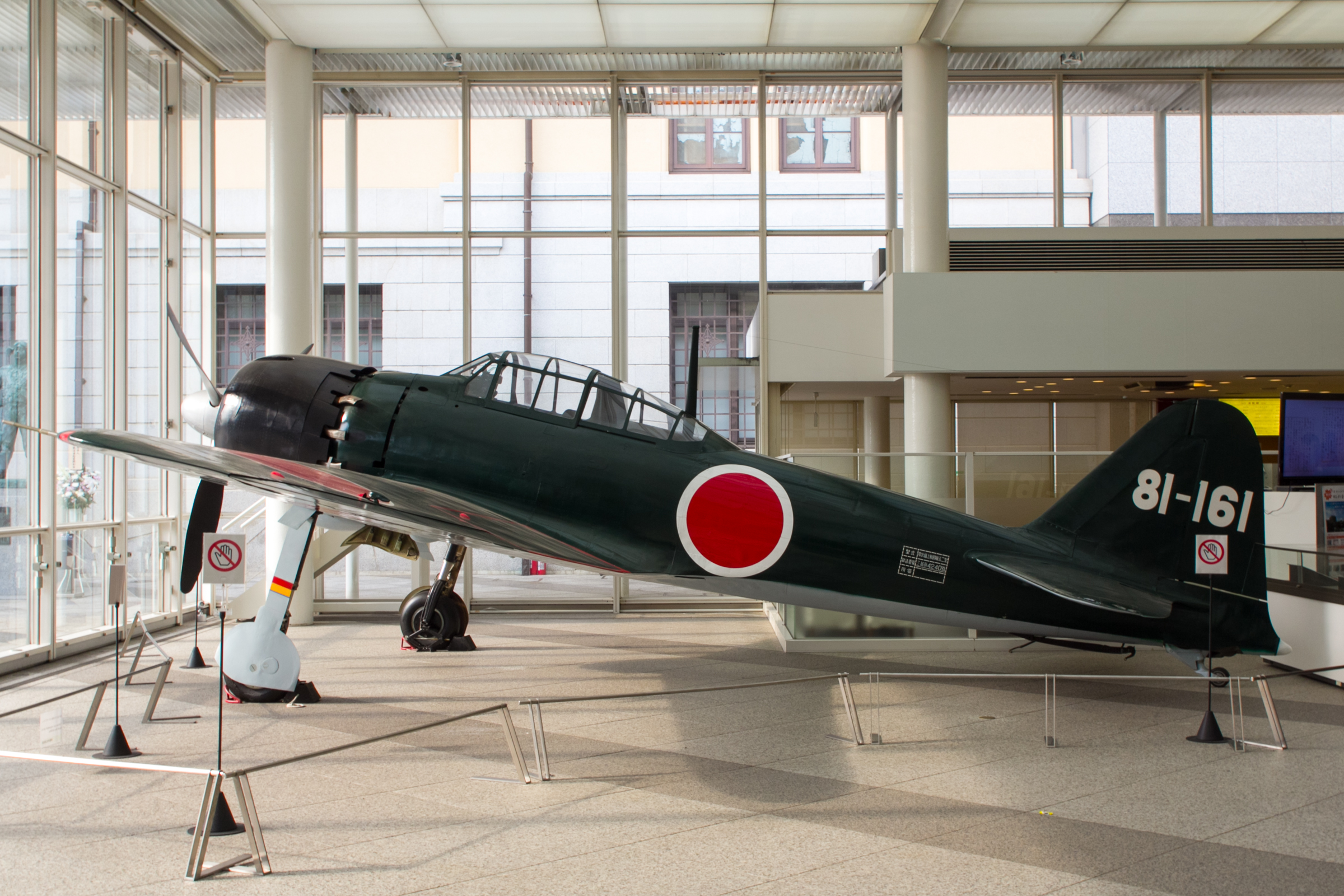
The museum's A6M Zero Model 52 fighter aircraft

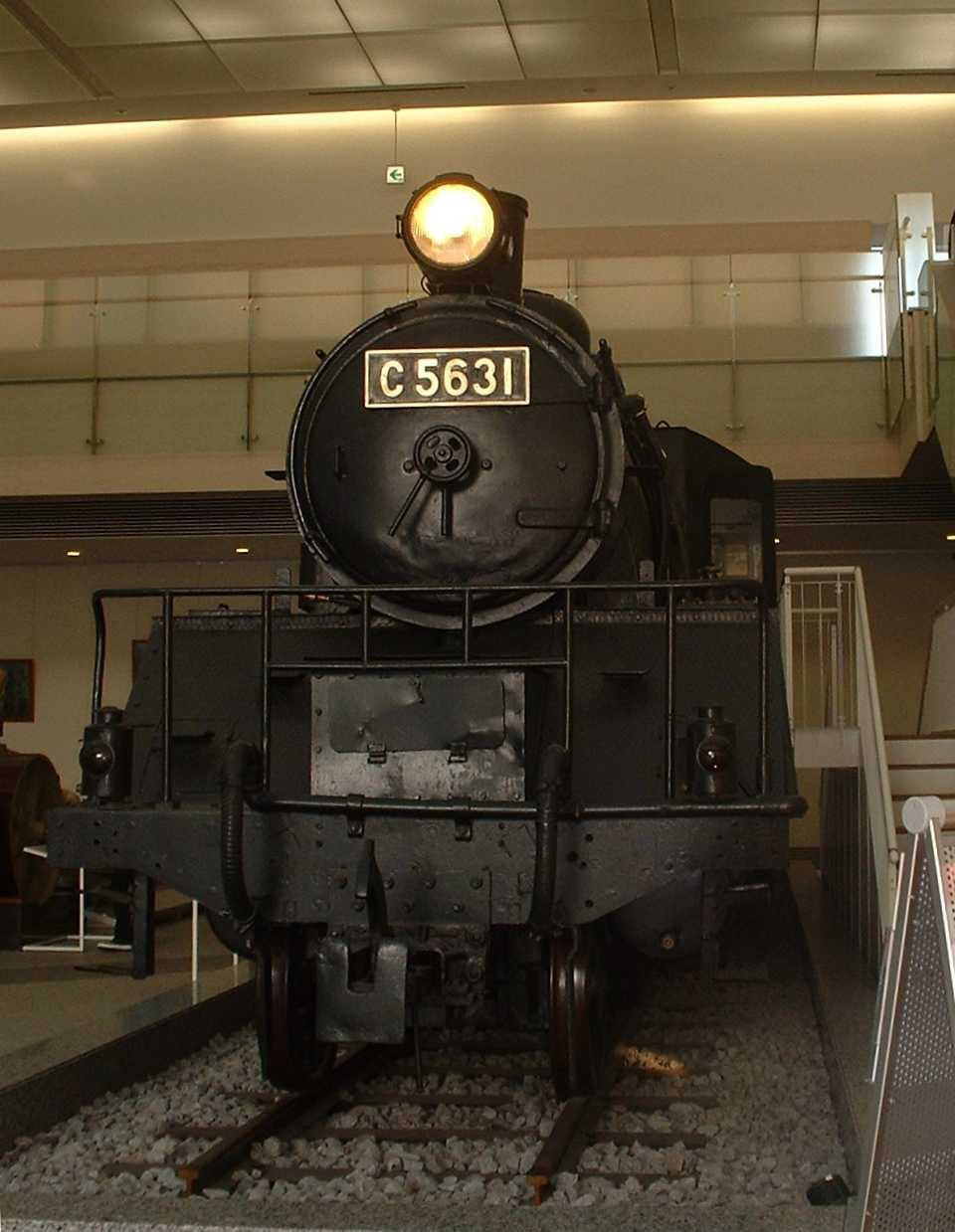
JNR Class C56 steam locomotive no. C56 31 retrieved from Thailand

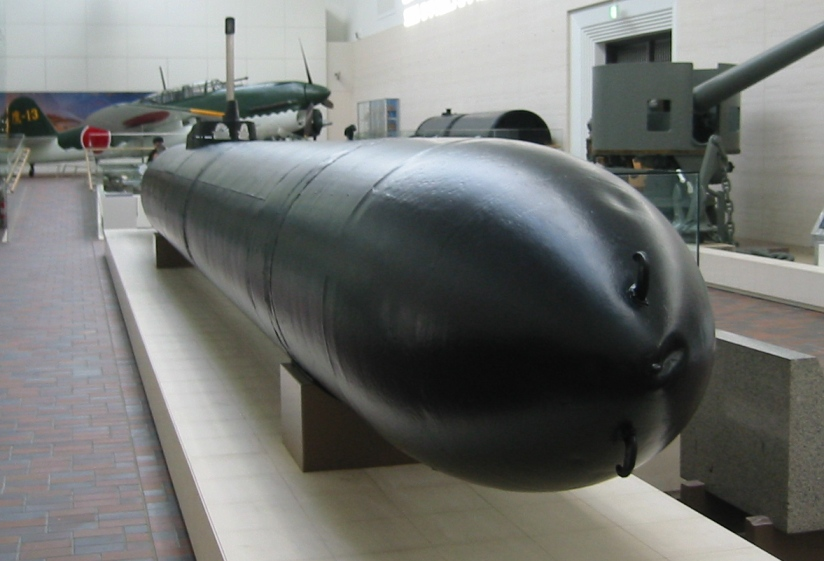
Kaiten Type 1 torpedo

The museum's exhibitions are centered on the Imperial Japanese Army and its weaponry, as well as Allied documents and exhibitions related to the modern Japan Self-Defense Forces and United States Forces in Japan. A cenotaph of a war horse is also located within the museum grounds.

The Museum also organizes special exhibitions each year, for example:

- Exhibition of Photographs of Battle Sites 80 Years after the End of the War (2025)
- Military Ration: From Meals for the Japanese Army and Navy to "offerings" to the spirits of war (2024)

=== First floor ===
The first floor entrance hall can be entered free of admission, and contains an A6M Zero fighter aircraft and a Class C56 steam locomotive number C56 31 used on the Thai-Burma Railway (often known as the Death Railway). A Type 89 15 cm Cannon and Type 96 15 cm Howitzer are also displayed in this area.

The large exhibit room on the first floor contains a Yokosuka D4Y bomber and Type 97 Chi-Ha recovered from Yap Island, along with a Kaiten-type torpedo and replicas of an Ohka Model 11 aircraft and battleship Mutsu.

A room holds mementos of kamikaze, various letters left behind by the pilots, and photo portraits, shown at the end of the hallway.

=== Second floor ===
The entrance hall escalator leads to the second floor exhibit room, which is the beginning of the museum tour. A signage quotes a text by the samurai Fujita Toko, Ode to the Righteous, calling "divine spirits" those who died "fighting for the public good".

Various war-related materials are exhibited in chronological order, including different types of swords, armor, guns, and a golden flag wielded by the Imperial Japanese Army during the Boshin War. The war flag of the 321st Imperial Japanese Army division displayed in this room is the only one of its kind that has been recovered fully intact.

== Stores ==
The museum's gift shop sells regional souvenirs in addition to various books and documents concerning Yasukuni Shrine. Toy army flags and other military-related toys can also be purchased here, and English-language pamphlets are available for foreign visitors. The museum also houses a café where the items on the menu are created using ingredients and recipes resembling those actually used on Japanese Navy ships.

== Revisionism ==
The museum contains revisionism in its accounts of Japan's actions in World War II, as well as glorifying Japan's aggressive militaristic past.

== Appearances in literature ==
- Natsume Sōseki. The Tower of London (倫敦塔, Rondon Tō; 1905)
- Ryūnosuke Akutagawa. Aphorisms by a Pygmy (侏儒の言葉, Shuju no Kotoba; 1923)
