= JGR Class 8900 =

Class 8900
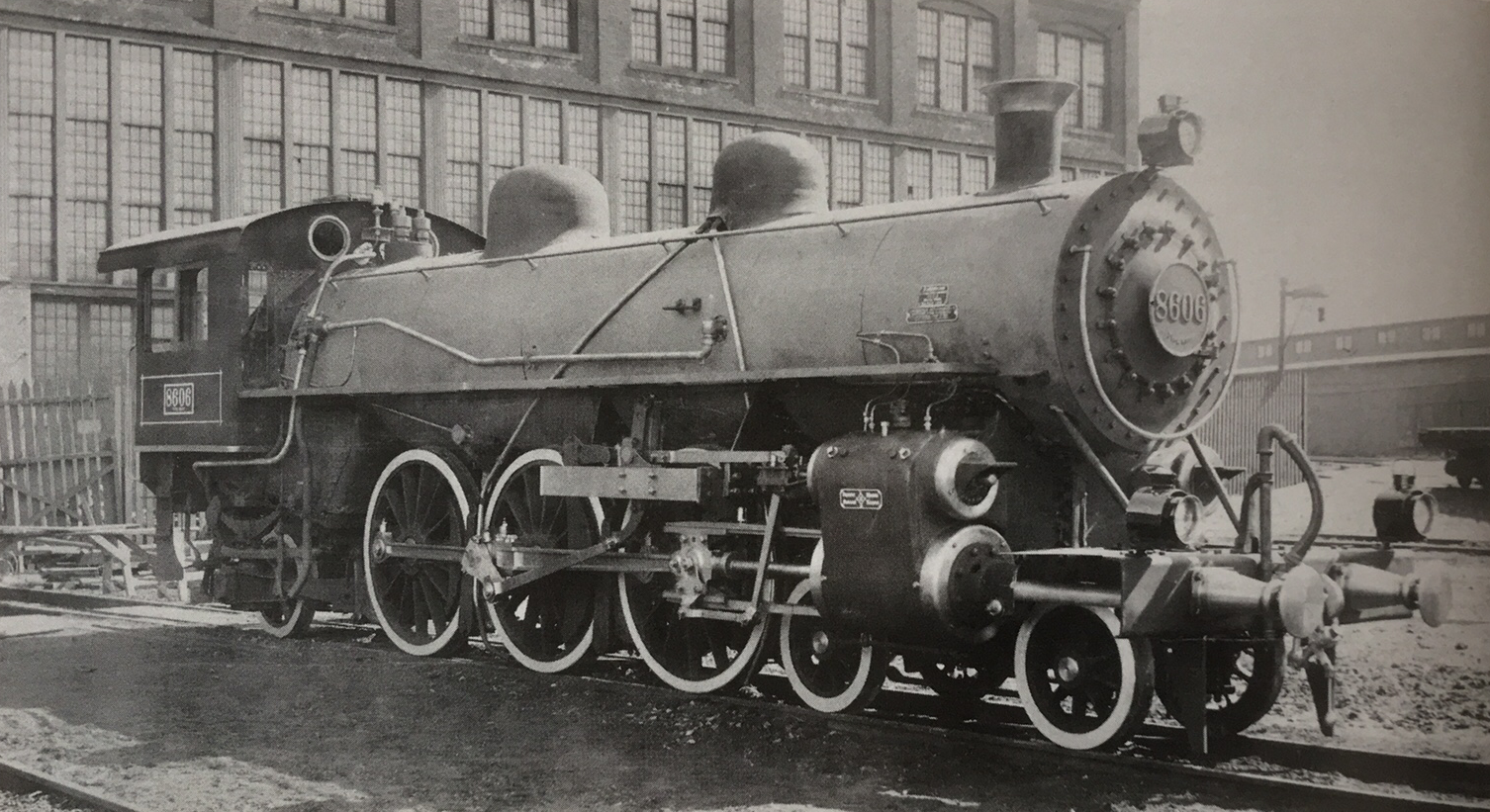
- Member of Class 8900 as built at Brooks Works
Type and origin
- Power type: Steam
- Builder: American Locomotive Company
- Build date: 1911-1912
- Total produced: 36
Specifications
- Configuration
  - Whyte: 4-6-2 Pacific
- Gauge: 1,067 mm (3 ft 6 in)
- Driver dia.: 1,600 mm (5 ft 3 in)
- Fuel type: Coal
- Valve gear: Walschaerts
Performance figures
- Tractive effort: 91.3 kN (20,500 lb_{f}) (Vacuum Braked); 86.3 kN (19,400 lb_{f}) (Air Braked)
Career
- Retired: 1934
- Disposition: All withdrawn and scrapped

The JGR Class 8900 was a type of 4-6-2 steam locomotive type formerly used in Japan by the Japanese Government Railways (JGR). The locomotives were built by the American Locomotive Company in the USA. They were the first 4-6-2 Pacific types used in Japan. They were numbered 8900-8935. They remained in service until 1957 when they were scrapped. None were preserved.

== History ==
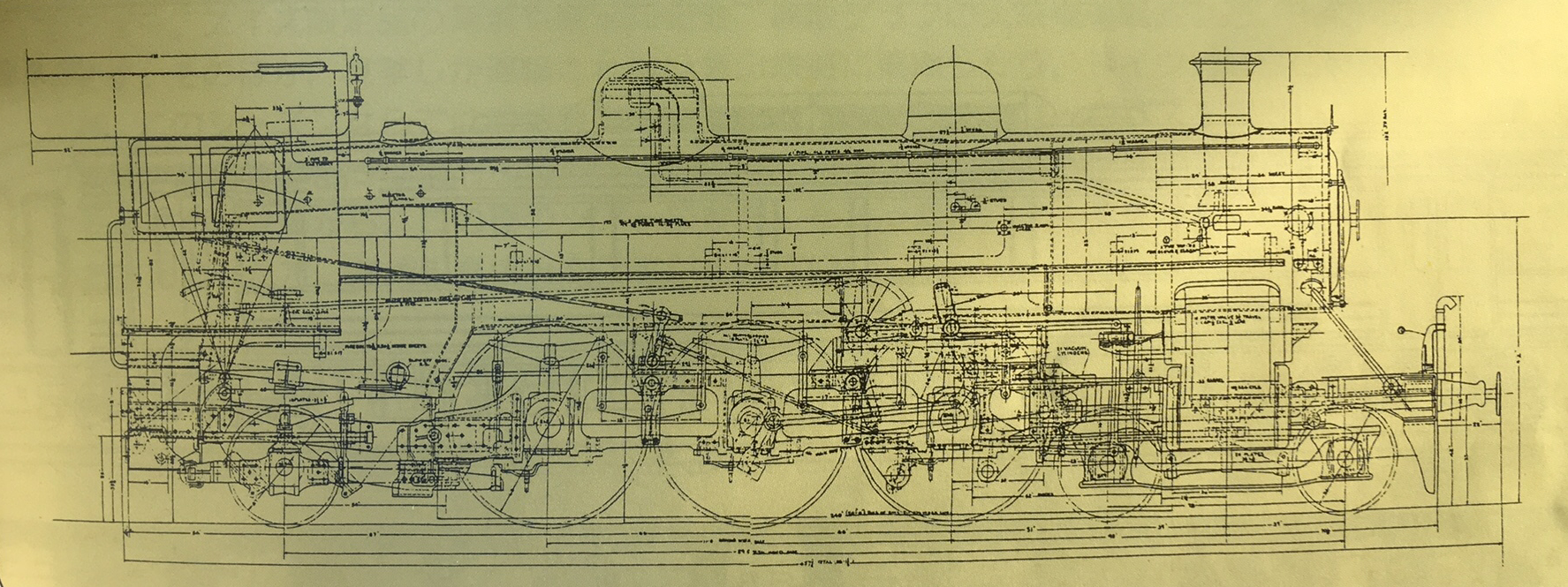
An engineering drawing of the 8900 Class 4-6-2 built for the Japanese Government Railways by ALCO.

Thirty-six locomotives were manufactured in two batches (the tenders were manufactured domestically). The first order of 24 locomotives (serial numbers 49805 - 49828) were manufactured by Brooks Works, and the second order of 12 locos (serial numbers 50535 - 50546) were manufactured by Richmond Works. The type was originally planned to be 8600 series, and the first order of 24 locomotives arrived with numbers 8600 - 8623, but due to a change in the wheel arrangement, the numbers were changed to the 8900 series (8900 - 8923). The second order from Richmond was originally completed with numbers 8924 - 8935. Occasionally these engines were used on royal train duties hauling Emperor Taishō.

== See also ==
- Japan Railways locomotive numbering and classification
- JNR Class C51
- JNR Class C53
- JNR Class C57
