= JGR Class 8150 =

Class of 6 Japanese 2-6-0 locomotives

Class 8150
Type and origin
- Power type: Steam
- Builder: Baldwin Locomotive Works
- Build date: 1890
- Total produced: 6
Specifications
- Configuration
  - Whyte: 2-6-0 Mogul
- Gauge: 1,067 mm (3 ft 6 in)
- Leading dia.: 762 mm (2 ft 6.0 in)
- Driver dia.: 1,219 mm (4 ft 0 in)
- Wheelbase: 5.969 m (19 ft 7.0 in)
- Length: 14.935 m (49 ft 0 in)
- Loco weight: 39.35 t
- Fuel type: Coal
- Fuel capacity: 3 t
- Water cap.: 8.2 m^{3} (2,166 US gal)
- Firebox
  - Grate area: 1.7 m^{2} (18 sq ft)
- Boiler pressure: 9.5 kg/cm^{2} (135 lbf/in^{2})
- Heating surface: 114.4 m^{2} (1,231 sq ft)
- Cylinders: Two
- Cylinder size: 45.7 cm × 55.9 cm (18 in × 22 in)

The Class 8150 is a type of 2-6-0 steam locomotive used on Japanese Government Railways. The 8150 class were among the seven hundred locomotives built by Baldwin Locomotive Works in the United States for export to Japan.

== See also ==
- Japan Railways locomotive numbering and classification
