= JNR Class C52 =

Class of 6 Japanese 4-6-2 steam locomotives

JGR 8200 class C52 class
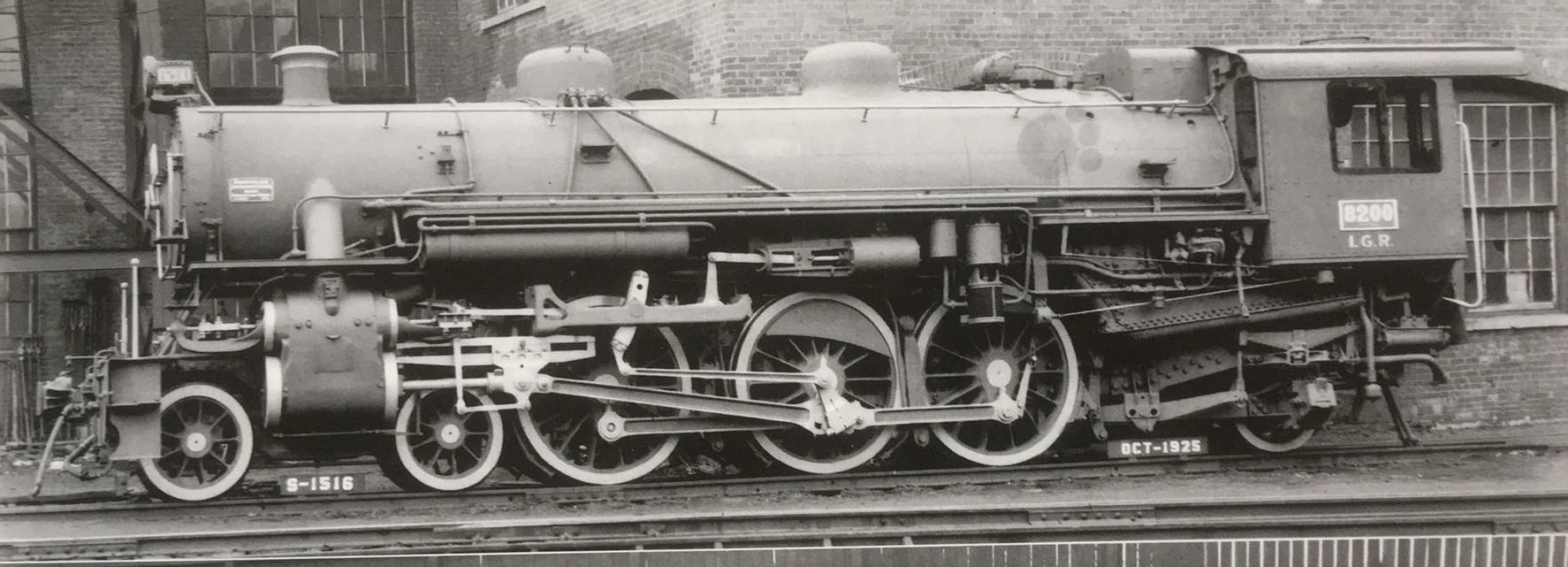
- Builder's photo of Japanese Government Railways C52 three-cylinder Pacific locomotive
Type and origin
- Power type: Steam
- Builder: American Locomotive Company Schenectady
- Serial number: 66409–66414
- Build date: November 1925
- Total produced: 6
Specifications
- Configuration
  - Whyte: 4-6-2
  - UIC: 2′C1′ h3
- Gauge: 1,067 mm (3 ft 6 in)
- Driver dia.: 1,600 mm (5 ft 3 in)
- Fuel type: Coal
- Cylinders: Three
- Valve gear: Outside: Walschaerts; Inside: Gresley
Career
- Operators: Japanese Government Railways; Japanese National Railways
- First run: February 1926
- Scrapped: 1947
- Disposition: All scrapped

The Class C52 (C52形) is a type of 4-6-2 steam locomotive built by the American Locomotive Company at Schenectady Works for the Japanese Government Railways in 1925. The locomotives were originally classified as the 8200 class under the JGR locomotive classification system until 1928.

They were acquired to sample the latest American three-cylinder conjugated valve gear steam technology; as a consequence only six – the minimum order – were purchased and the tenders were built locally by Hitachi. They were the last Japanese steam locomotives to be imported. These served as an exemplary forerunner to the C53.

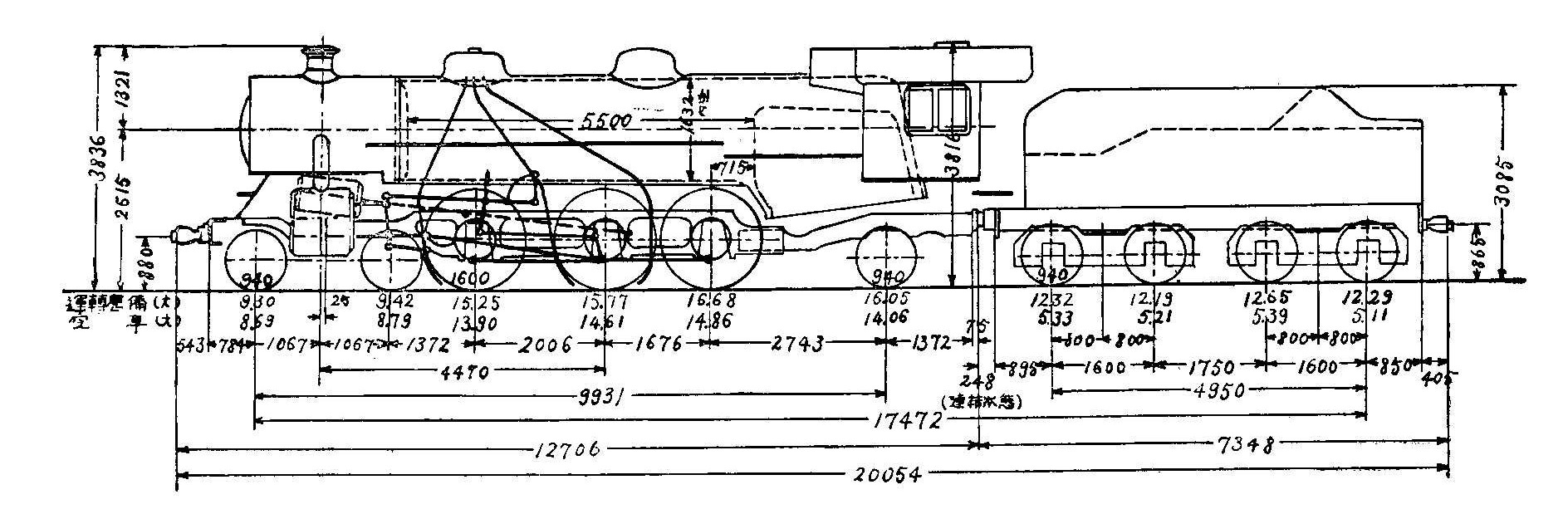
Drawing (before renovation)

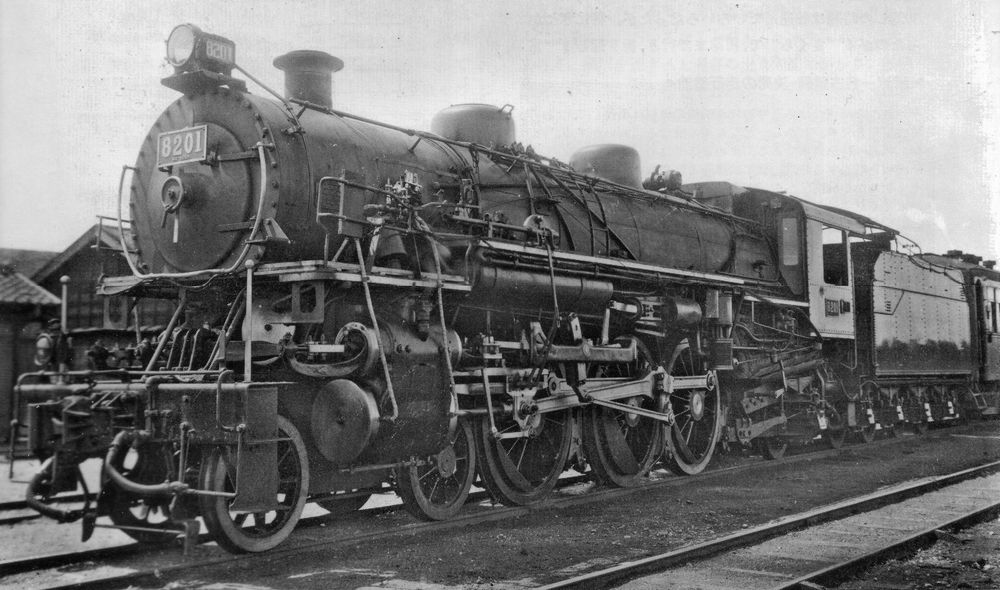

== See also ==
- Japan Railways locomotive numbering and classification
- JGR Class 8900
- JNR Class C51
- JNR Class C53
