= JNR Class C53 =

Class of 97 Japanese 4-6-2 steam locomotives

Class C53
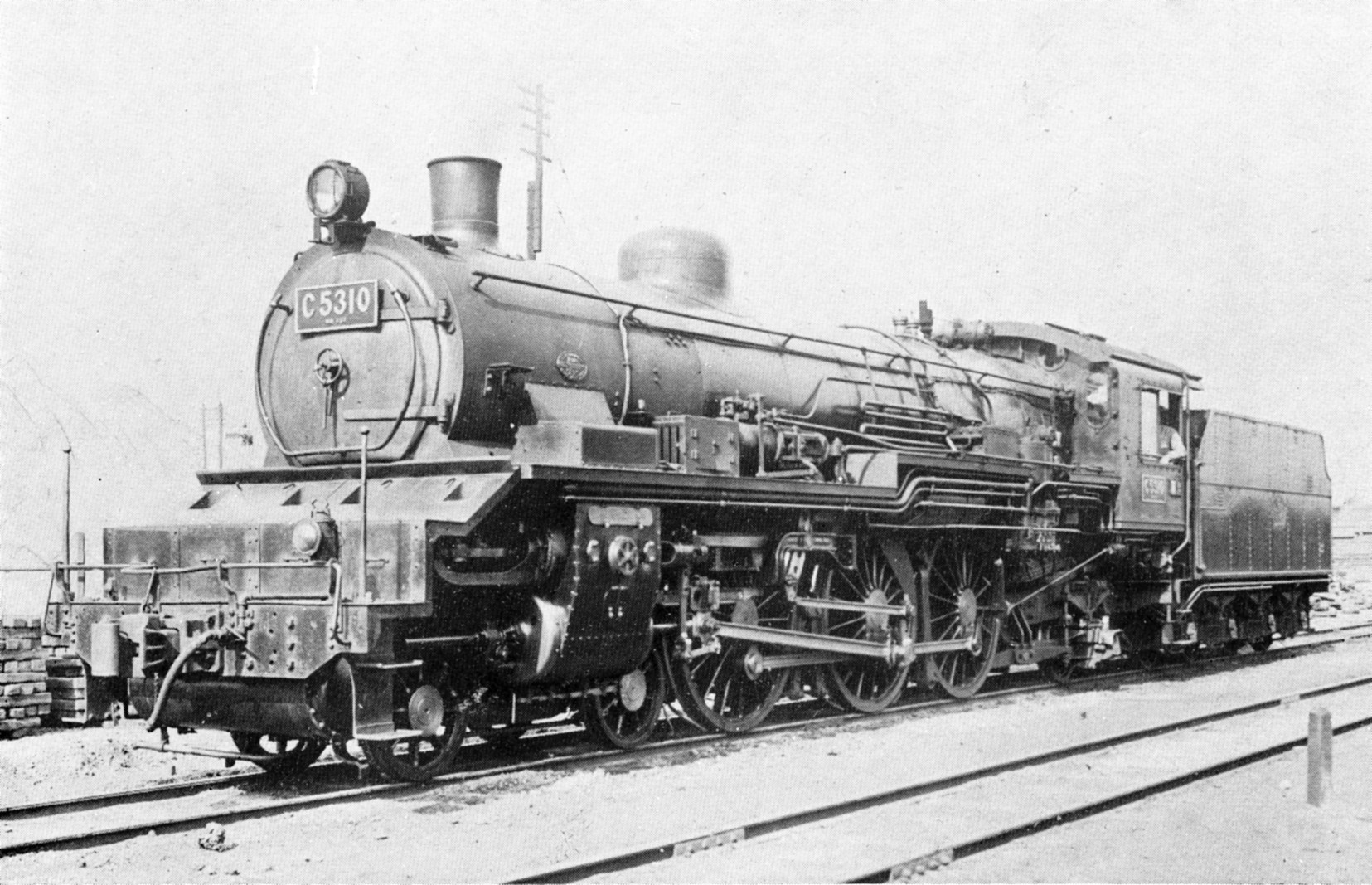
- C53 10 in January 1935
Type and origin
- Power type: Steam
- Builder: Kawasaki Heavy Industries Rolling Stock Company Kisha Seizō, Mitsubishi Heavy Industries Hitachi
- Build date: 1928-1929
- Total produced: 97
Specifications
- Configuration
  - Whyte: 4-6-2 Pacific
- Gauge: 1,067 mm (3 ft 6 in)
- Total weight: 115.50 t (113.68 long tons; 127.32 short tons)
- Fuel type: Coal
- Firebox
  - Grate area: 3.25 m^{2} (35.0 sq ft)
- Boiler pressure: 14 kg/cm^{2} (199.1 psi; 1,372.9 kPa)
- Cylinders: Three
- Valve gear: Outside: Walschaerts; Inside: Gresley conjugated
- Valve type: Piston valves
Performance figures
- Power output: 1,250 PS (919 kW; 1,230 hp)
Career
- Operators: JNR
- Number in class: 97
- Numbers: C53 1-C53 97
- Retired: 1950
- Preserved: 1
- Disposition: One preserved (C53 45); remainder scrapped

The Class C53 (C53形) is a type of 4-6-2 steam locomotive built in Japan from 1928 to 1929. The locomotives were designed by Hideo Shima and built by Kawasaki Heavy Industries Rolling Stock Company, Kisha Seizo, Mitsubishi Heavy Industries and Hitachi. A total of 97 Class C53 locomotives were built.

The locomotives are notable for being the only non-experimental three-cylinder locomotives in Japan's railway history. They used the Gresley conjugated valve gear, which enabled high performance on the mainline. However, their mechanical complexity led to a short service life, especially after better-performing locomotives, such as the Class C59 and C62, entered production in the 1940s during and after the war. All 97 locomotives were retired by 1950.

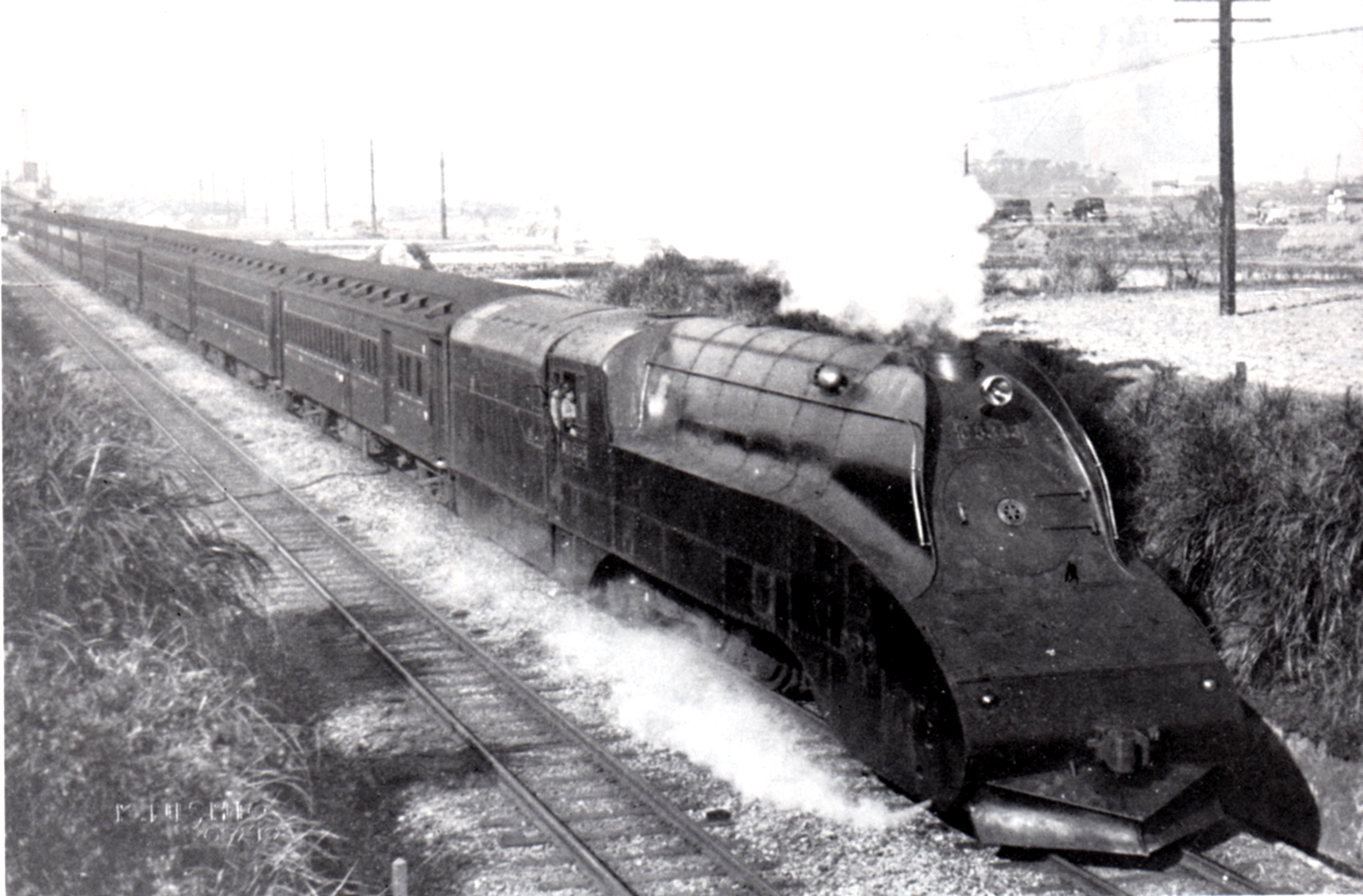
Streamlined C53 43 hauling the Fuji on 9 December 1934

== Preserved examples ==
Today, only one Class C53 locomotive has been preserved in Japan, C53 45, at the Kyoto Railway Museum (formerly Umekoji Steam Locomotive Museum).

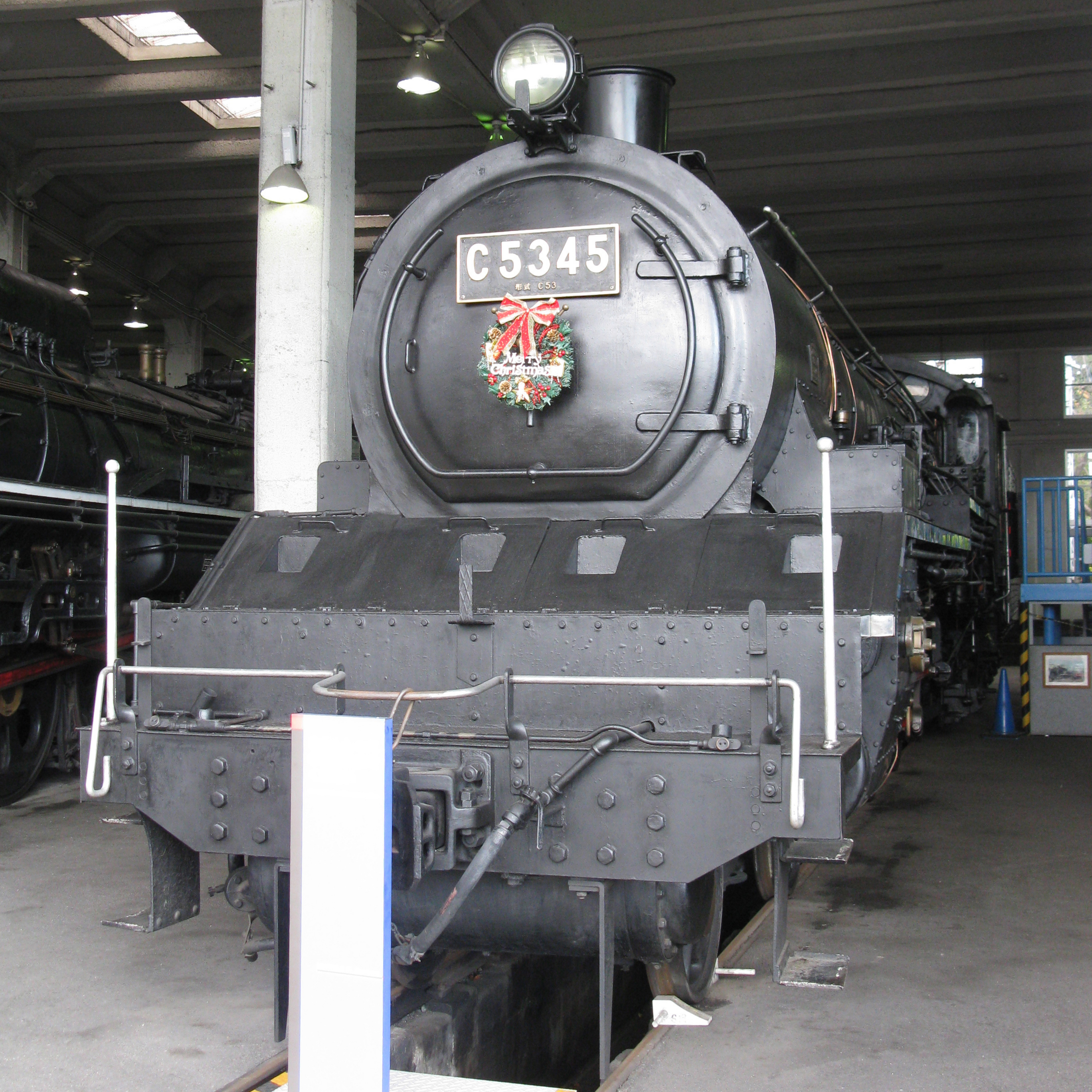
C53 45 preserved at Umekoji Steam Locomotive Museum in December 2011

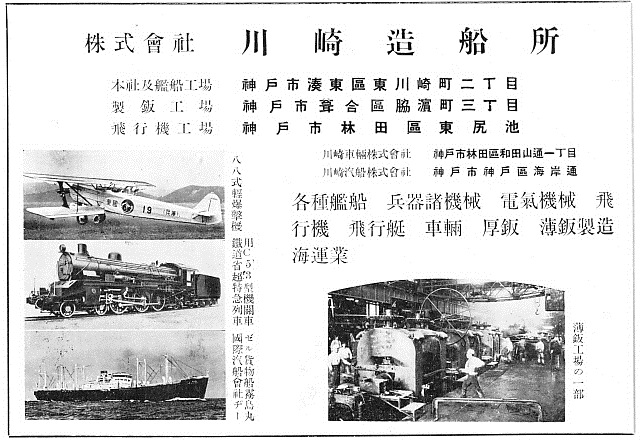
C53 on a Kawasaki Heavy Industries advertisement

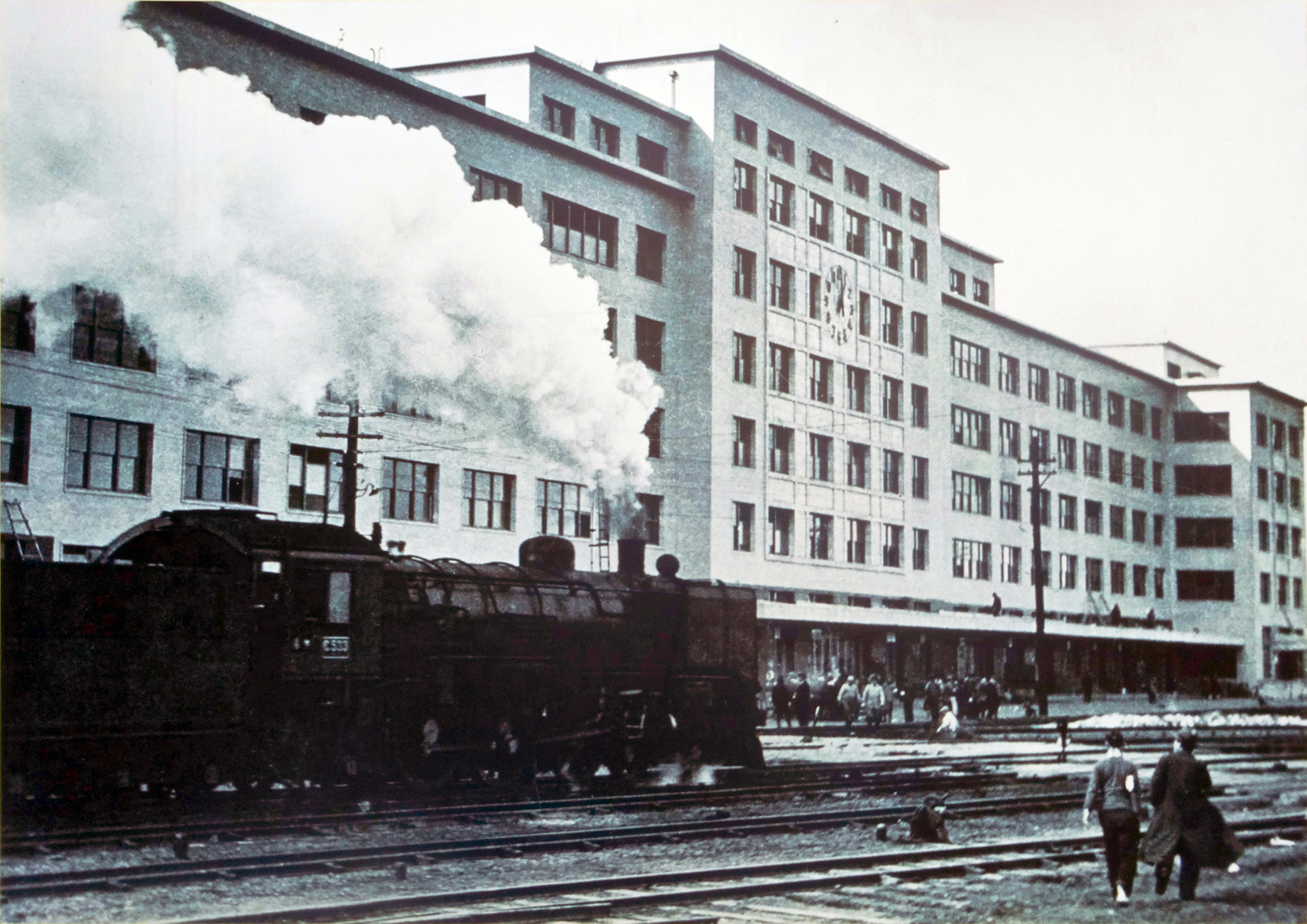
C53 3 passing by Nagoya Station

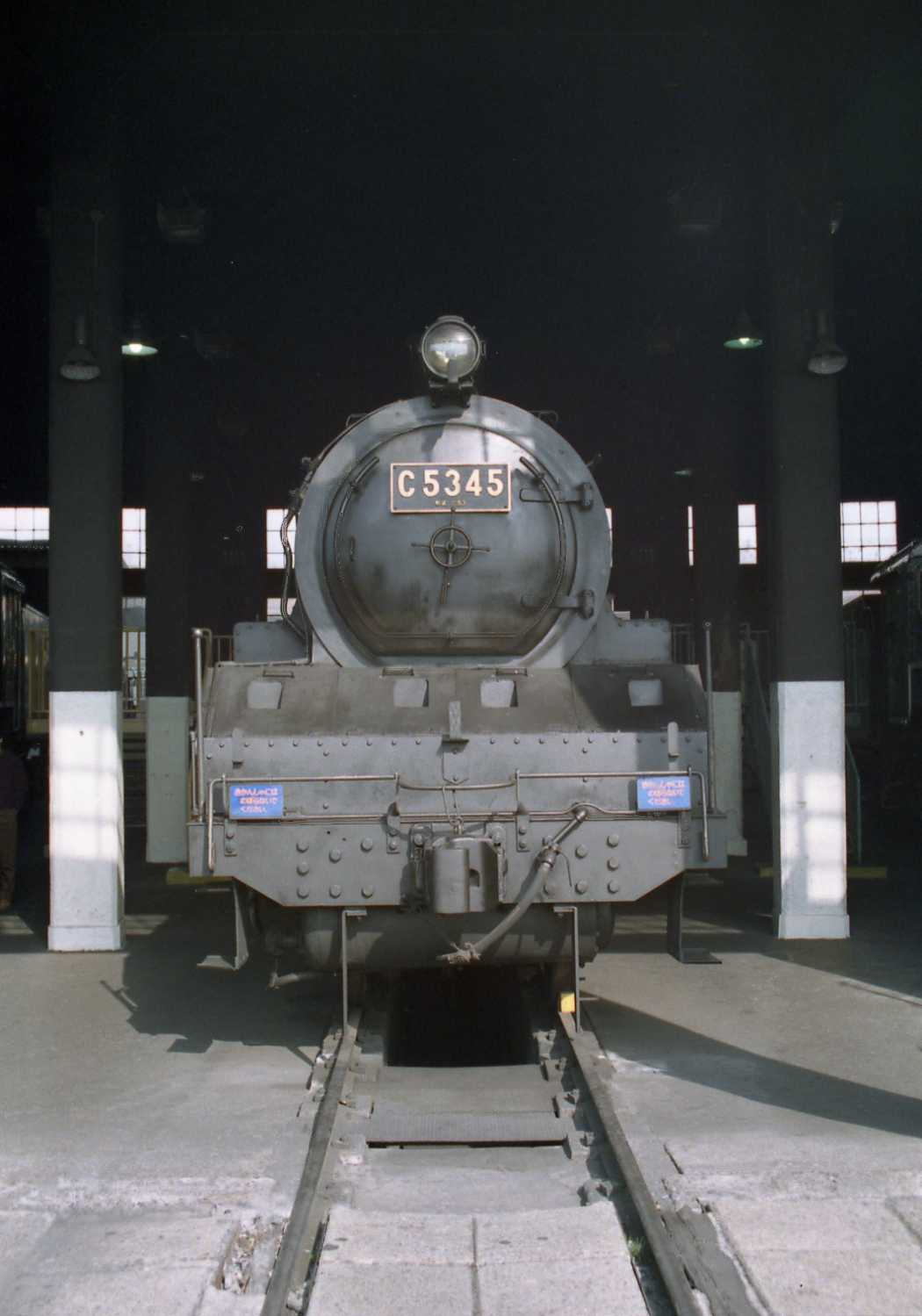
C53 45 steam loco frontview

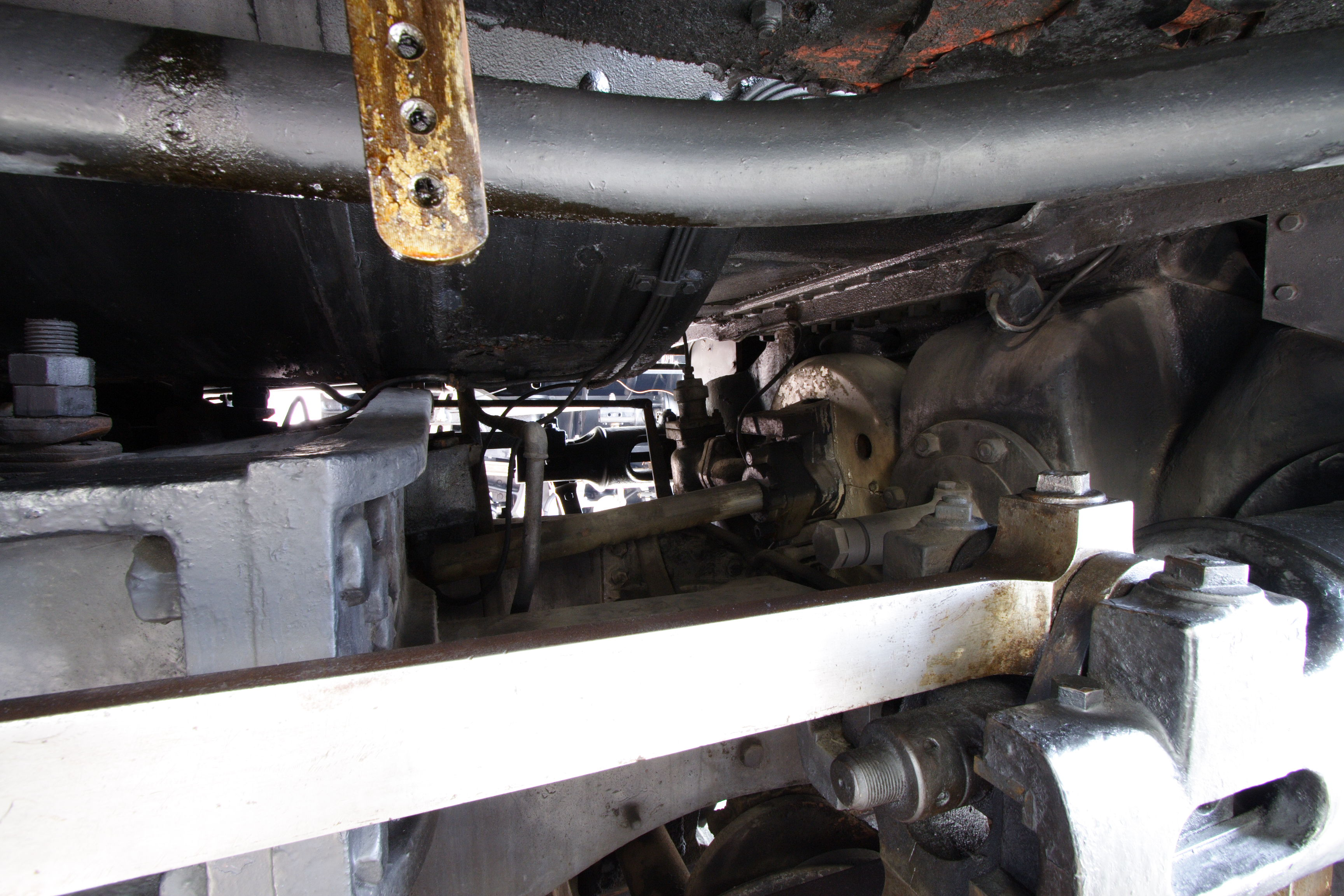
C53 The 3 cylinder

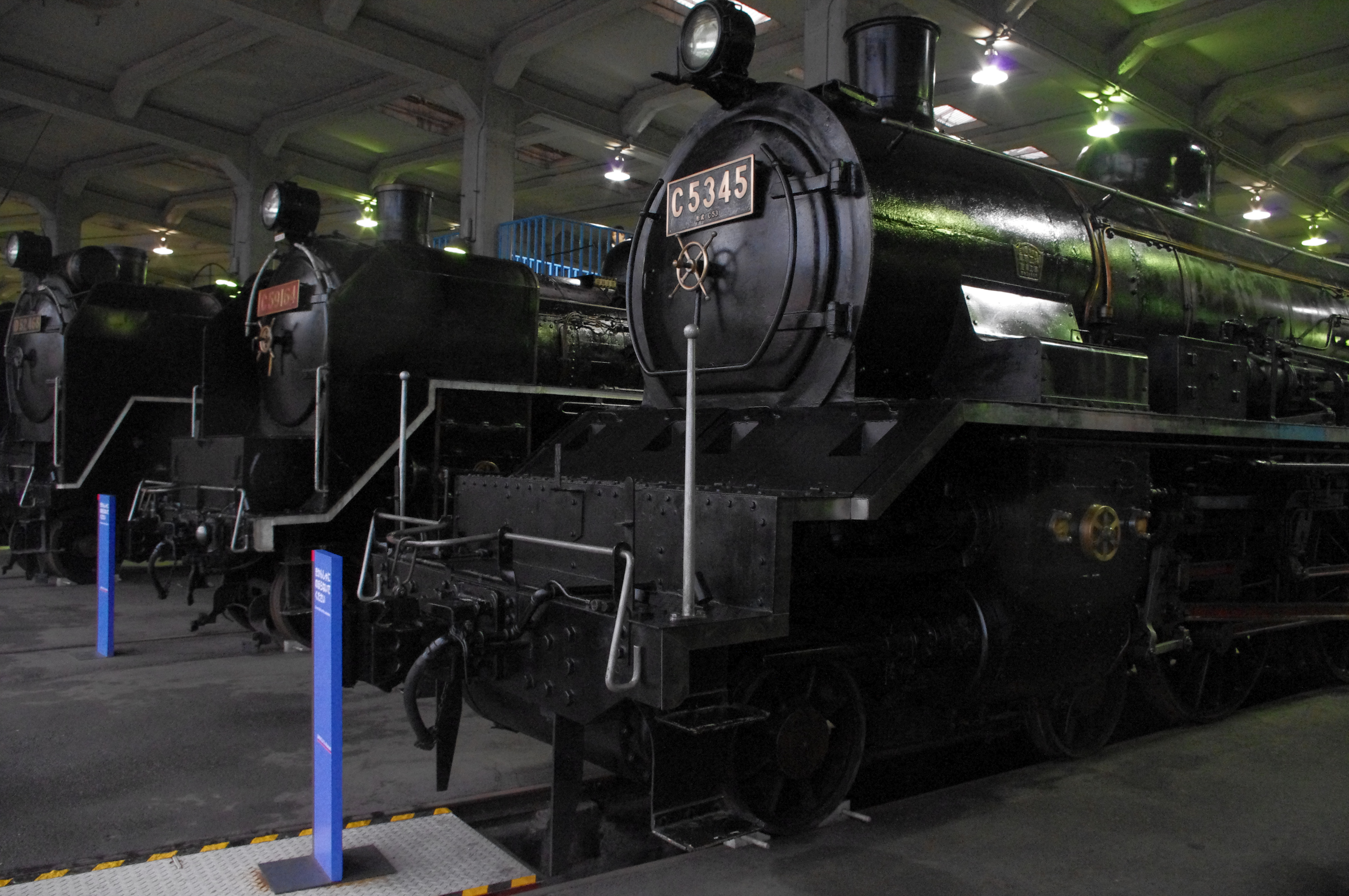
C53 45 at the Kyoto Railway Museum

== See also ==
- Japan Railways locomotive numbering and classification
- JNR Class C51
- JNR Class C52
- JNR Class C54
- JNR Class C59
