= JNR Class ED10 =

Class of 2 Japanese electric locomotives

Class ED10
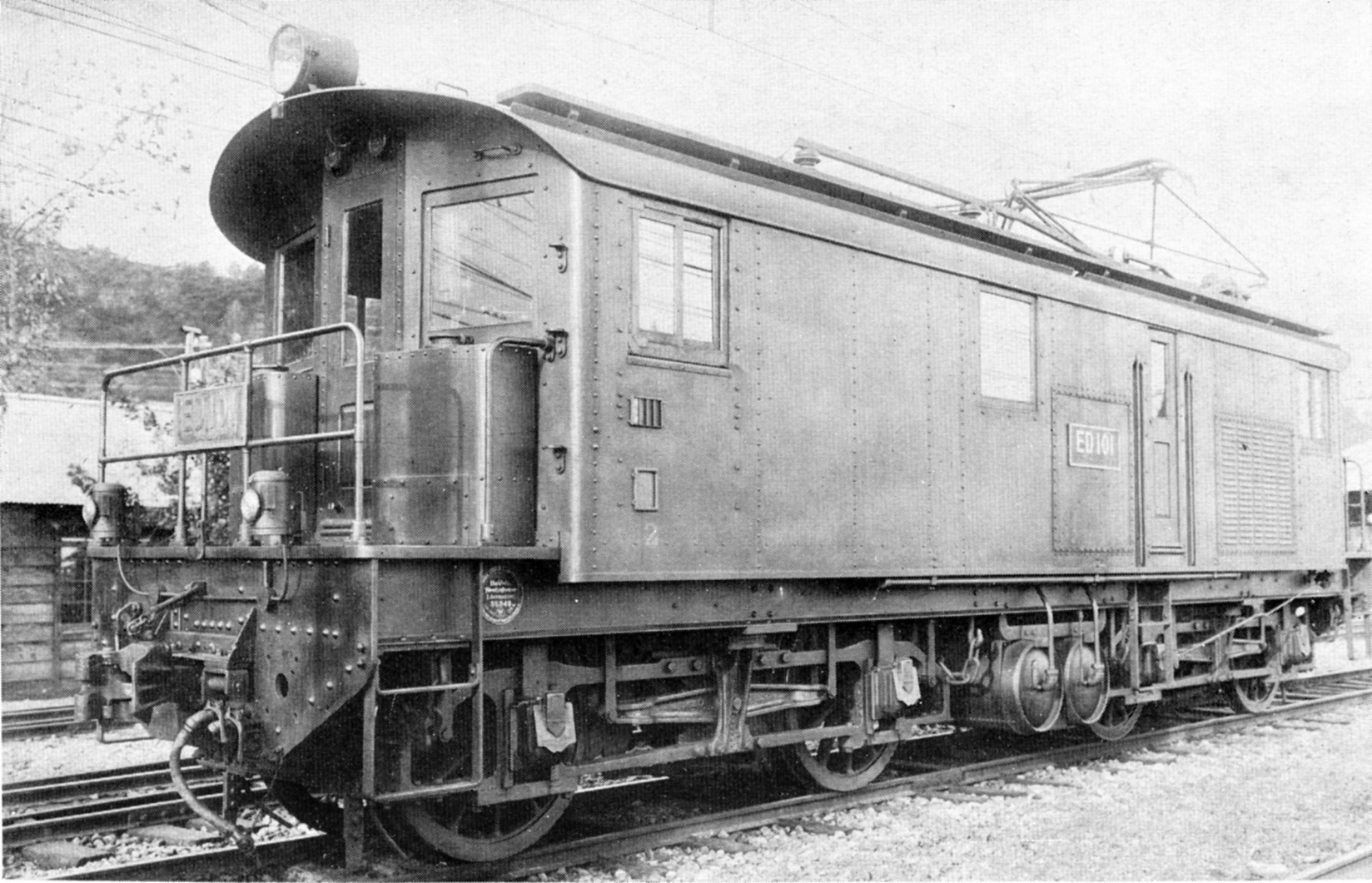
- ED10 1 in 1936
Type and origin
- Power type: Electric
- Builder: Westinghouse Electric (electrical components) and Baldwin (mechanical components)
- Build date: 1922
Specifications
- Configuration
  - UIC: Bo-Bo
- Gauge: 1,067 mm (3 ft 6 in)
- Length: 12,080 mm (39 ft 8 in)
- Width: 2,790 mm (9 ft 2 in)
- Height: 4,105 mm (13 ft 5.6 in)
- Service weight: 61.1 t (60.1 long tons; 67.4 short tons)
- Electric system/s: 1,500 V DC
Performance figures
- Maximum speed: 65 km/h (40 mph)
- Power output: 820 kW (1,100 hp)
Career
- Operators: JGR; JNR; Seibu
- Number in class: 2
- Withdrawn: 1986
- Disposition: ED10 2 preserved, ED10 1 scrapped

The Class ED10 (ED10形) was a Bo-Bo wheel arrangement electric locomotive that operated in Japan from 1922.

The two locomotives in the class were designed and built by Westinghouse Electric (electrical components) and Baldwin (mechanical components) in 1922. Originally designated "Class 1000", the locomotives were reclassified ED10 in 1928. The unit has a Bo-Bo wheel arrangement and is powered by four DC traction motors producing a total of 1,100 horsepower. The ED10 weighs just over 67 tons and has a top speed of 40 miles per hour (64 km/h).

== Preserved examples ==
Following its withdrawal in 1960, ED10 2 was sold to the Seibu Railway, where it became number E71. It operated until 1986, after which it was preserved at Yokoze Depot and returned to its original JNR-era livery.

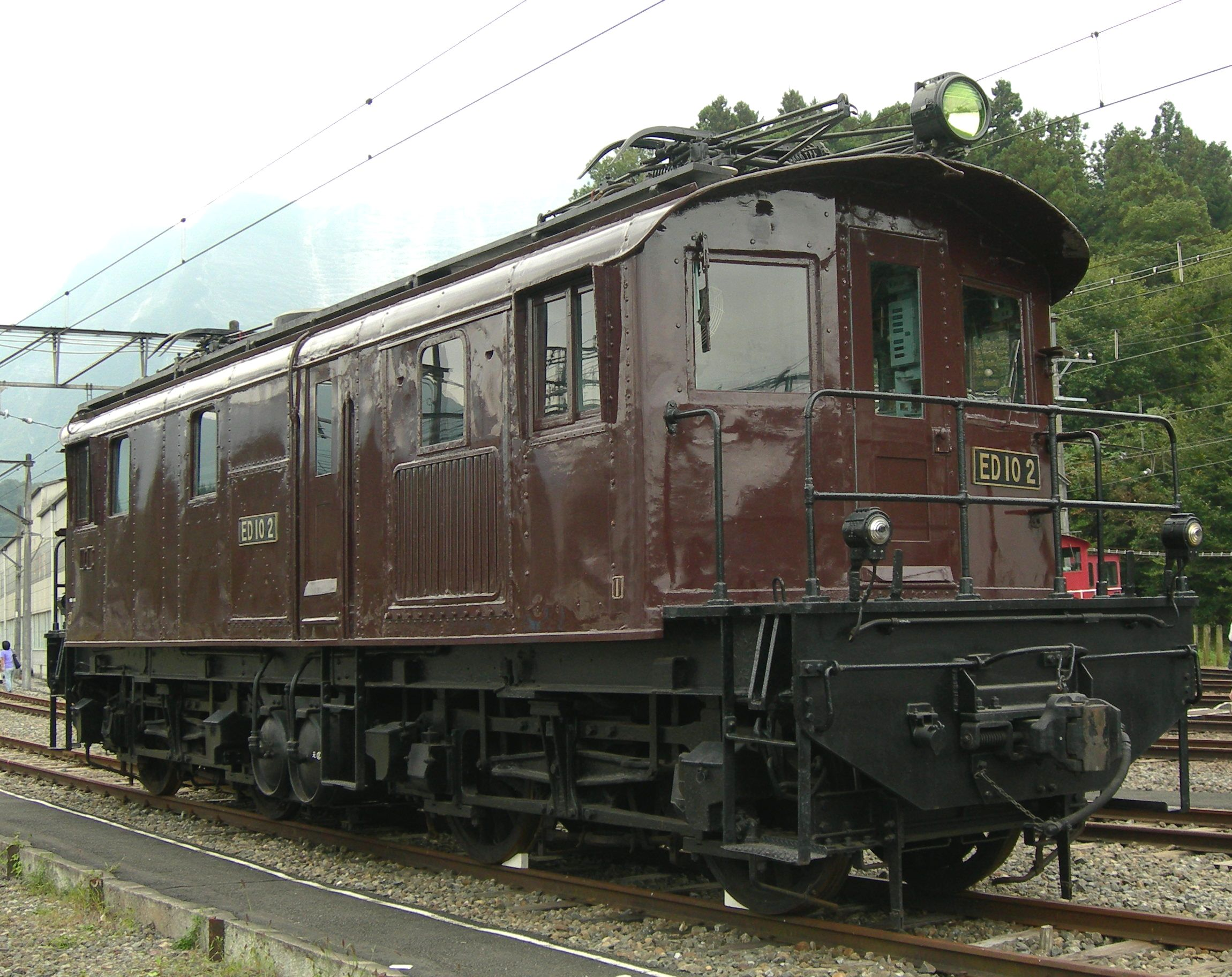
Preserved locomotive ED10 2, October 2009

== See also ==
- Japan Railways locomotive numbering and classification
