= JNR Class C51 =

Class of 289 Japanese 4-6-2 locomotives

JGR/JNR Class C51 Central China Ry Pashina class (パシナ) China Railways SL9 (勝利9)
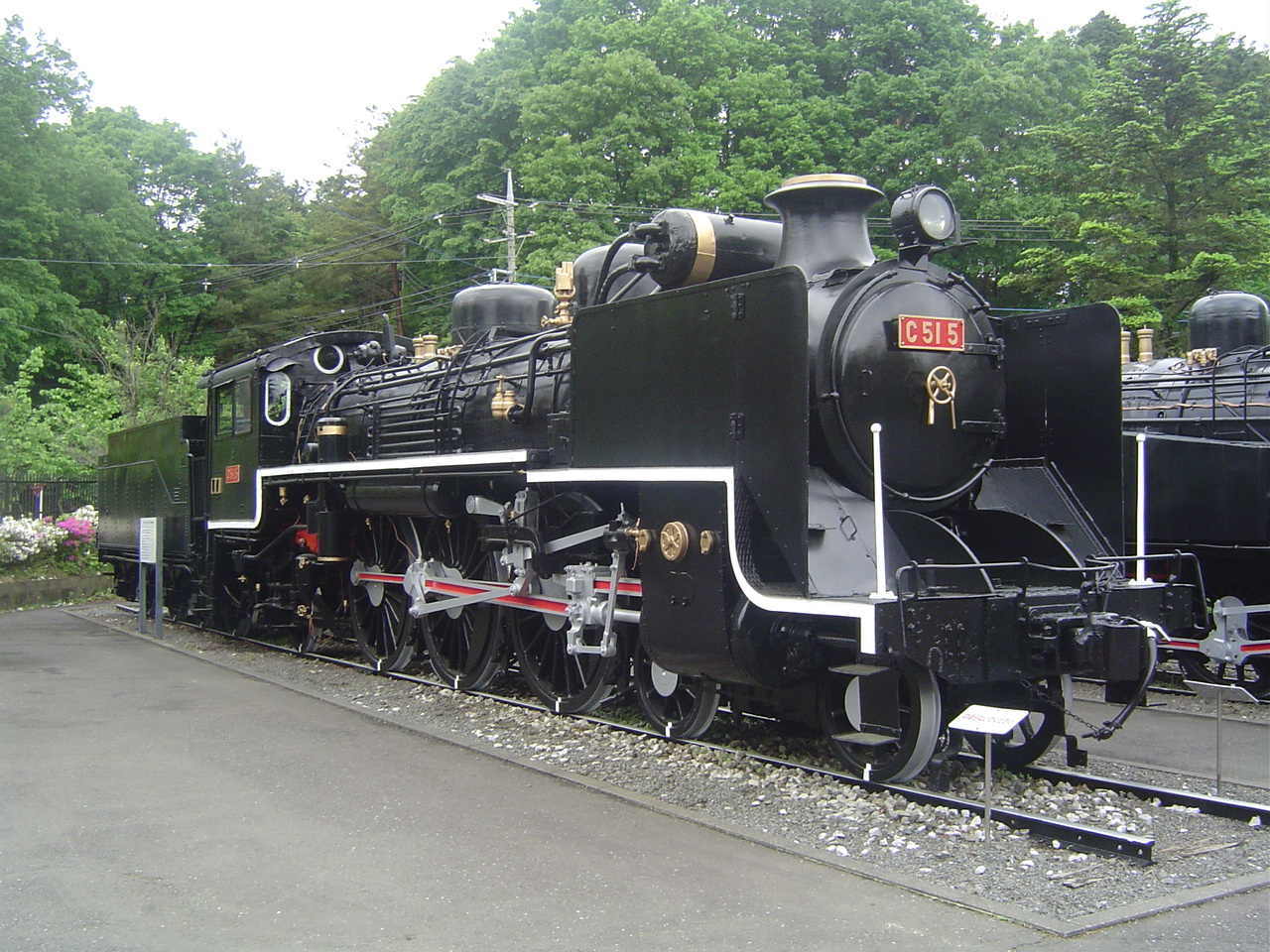
- Preserved C51 5 at Ome Railway Park, May 2006
Type and origin
- Power type: Steam
- Builder: Kisha Seizō, Mitsubishi, JNR - Hamamatsu
- Build date: 1919-1928
- Total produced: 289
Specifications
- Configuration
  - Whyte: 4-6-2
- Gauge: 1,067 mm (3 ft 6 in)
- Leading dia.: 940 mm (3 ft 1 in)
- Driver dia.: 1,750 mm (5 ft 9 in)
- Trailing dia.: 940 mm (3 ft 1 in)
- Wheelbase: 10 m (32 ft 10 in)
- Length: 19.994 m (65 ft 7.2 in)
- Loco weight: 69.6 t
- Total weight: 113.8 t
- Fuel type: Coal
- Fuel capacity: 8 t
- Water cap.: 17 m^{3} (4,491 US gal)
- Firebox
  - Grate area: 2.53 m^{2} (27 sq ft)
- Boiler pressure: 13 kg/cm^{2} (180 lbf/in^{2})
- Heating surface: 127.4 m^{2} (1,371 sq ft)
- Superheater
  - Heating area: 41.4 m^{2} (446 sq ft)
- Cylinders: Two
- Cylinder size: 53 cm × 66 cm (21 in × 26 in)
- Valve gear: Walschaerts
Performance figures
- Maximum speed: 99.1 km/h (61.6 mph)
Career
- Retired: 1966
- Disposition: Four preserved (all in Japan), remainder scrapped

The Class C51 (C51形) are a type of 4-6-2 "Pacific" type steam locomotives built by Kisha Seizo Mitsubishi and Japanese National Railways (JNR) Hamamatsu Works. The C classification indicates three sets of driving wheels. The C51 introduced 1.75 m (5 ft 9 in) diameter driving wheels to Japan. C51s raised the average speed on the Tōkaidō Main Line from 47.3 km/h (29.4 mph) to 55.3 km/h (34.4 mph). In 1930, a C51 hauled the first Tsubame (swallow) express, reducing travel time between Tokyo and Kōbe to 9 hours.

== China Railway class SL9 ==
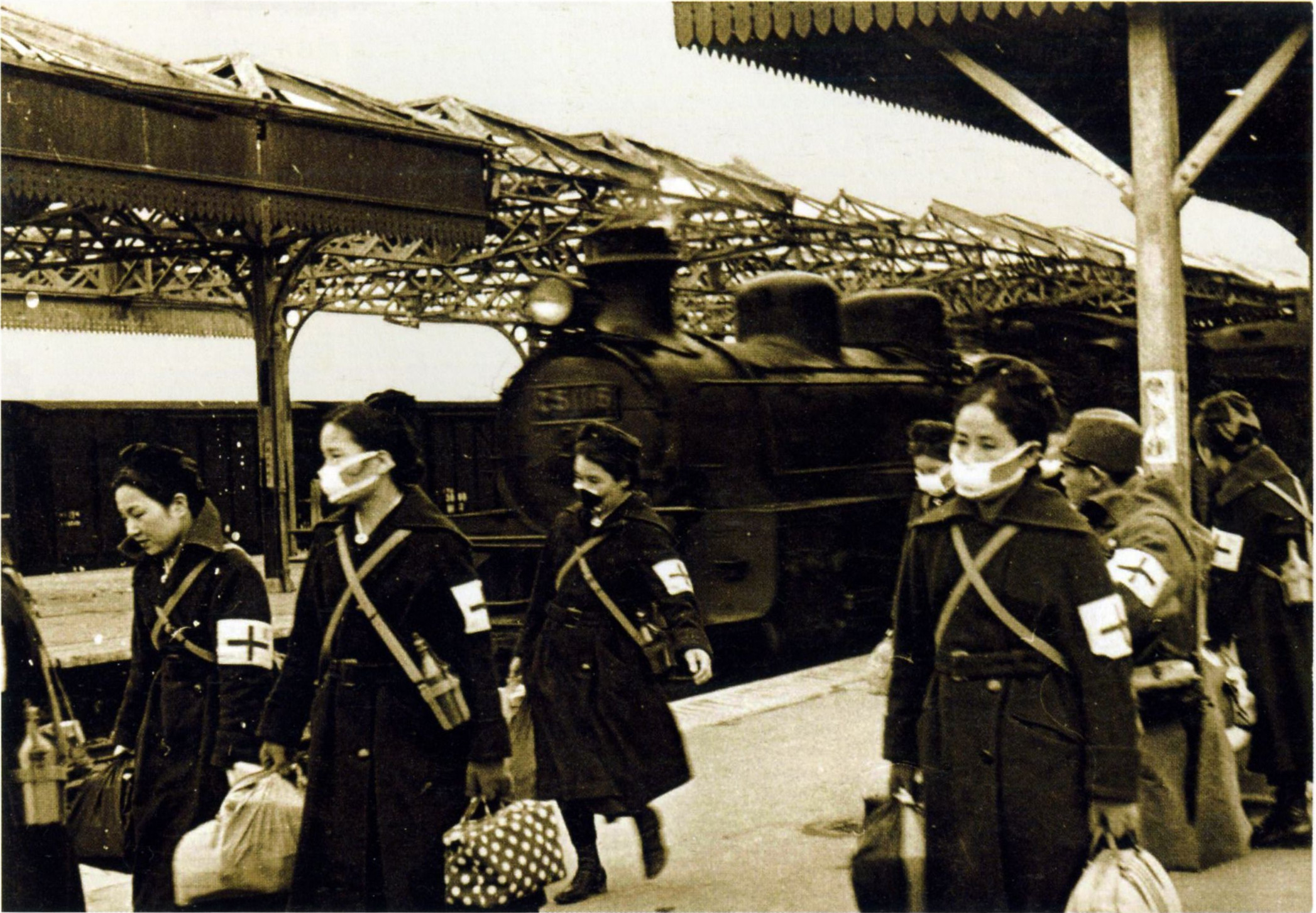
Central China Railway C51 116 at Suzhou Station, 30 January 1939

To alleviate a severe motive power shortage, sixteen JGR Class C51 locomotives, C51 8, 28, 30, 33 - 35, 88, 95, 96, 116, 130 - 132, 173, 175, and 178, all equipped with a Sumiyama feedwater heater, were converted to standard gauge and sent to the Central China Railway in 1939, where they operated primarily between Nanjing and Shanghai, at first with their original JGR numbers, later as パシナ (Pashina) class. After the Liberation of China and the establishment of the People's Republic, these became China Railway class ㄆㄒ9 (PX9) in 1951, and reclassified as class SL9 (勝利9, Shènglì, "victory") in 1959.

== Preserved examples ==
As of 2012, four Class C51 locomotives were preserved at various locations.

- C51 5: At the Railway Museum in Saitama, Saitama (formerly preserved outdoors at the Ome Railway Park in Ome, Tokyo
- C51 44: At Akita Depot in Akita, Akita
- C51 85: At Kagoshima Depot in Kagoshima, Kagoshima
- C51 239: At the Umekoji Steam Locomotive Museum in Kyoto

== See also ==
- Japan Railways locomotive numbering and classification
- JGR Class 8900
- JNR Class C52
