= Japan Railways locomotive numbering and classification =

This page explains the numbering and classification schemes for locomotives employed by the Japanese Government Railways, the Japanese National Railways and the Japan Railways Group.

== Steam locomotives ==
=== Pre-nationalization ===
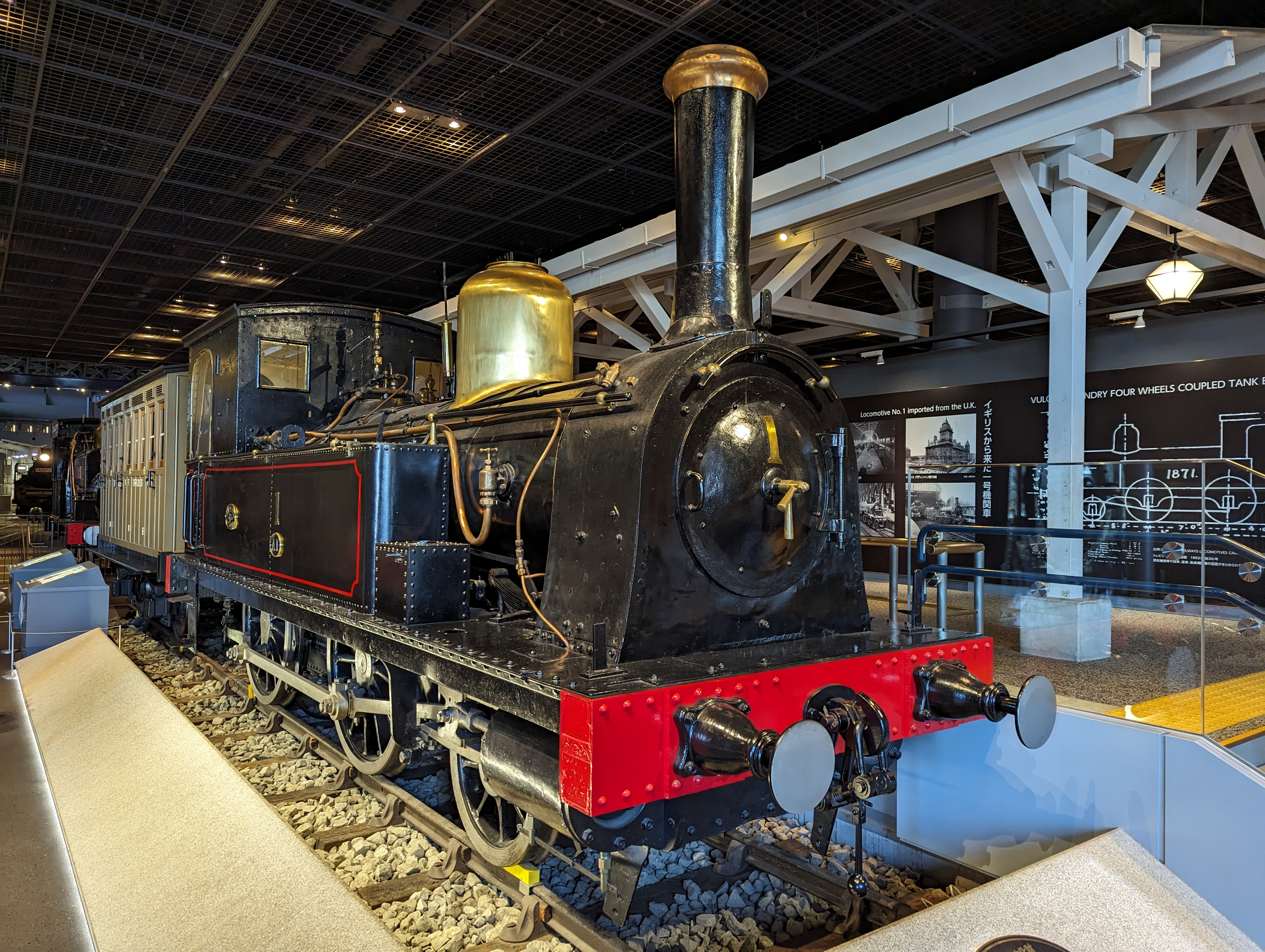
The first locomotive of Japan, Locomotive No. 1, historically classified as E, A1 and 150

Prior to the nationalization of Japanese railways in 1906 and 1907, the government-run railways had numbered their steam locomotives only with serial numbers without consideration of the types of the locomotives. From the beginning of the Kobe–Osaka railway in 1874, they allocated odd numbers to locomotives in Tokyo area and even numbers to locomotives in Kobe area, but this custom was not maintained after the completion of railway between Tokyo and Kobe in 1889. Later, some locomotives, such as Classes A8 and B6 and rack railway locomotives, were renumbered to make groups for easy recognition of classes.

Classes were introduced by Francis H. Trevithick (1850–1931), a grandson of Richard Trevithick, employed by the government of Japan for supervision of rolling stock management. He classified the locomotives with one Latin letter (A through Z), which was then expanded to use two letters (AB, AC, AD, and so on).

Later, this simple method was revised to use one letter and one or two digit numerals with consideration of locomotive types. The meanings of the letters were as follows:

- A – Tank locomotives with two driving axles (A1–A10)
- B – Tank locomotives with three driving axles (B1–B7)
- C – Tank locomotives for rack railway (C1–C3)
- D – Tender locomotives with two driving axles (D1–D12)
- E – Tender locomotives with three driving axles (E1–E7)
- F – Tender locomotives with four driving axles (F1–F2)

Each private railway had its own classification system at the time. For example, the Nippon Railway used the Swiss classification system.

=== 1909 numbering system ===
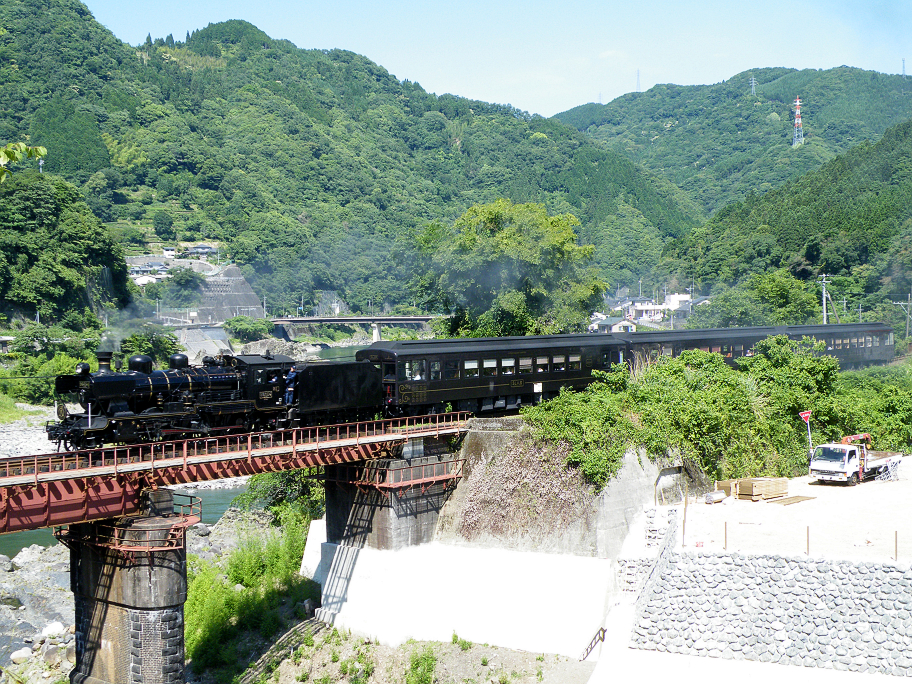
SL Hitoyoshi locomotive 58654 of Class 8620

Following the railway nationalization, in 1909, the railway authority adopted a new system in which locomotives were numbered and classified by four-digit numerals. All existing locomotives were reclassified. Numbers 1 through 4999 were allocated for tank locomotives and 5000 through 9999 were allocated for tender locomotives. Here the classes and the numbers acquired a distinct relationship. Locomotives were grouped in numbers and the classes were represented by the earliest number of the group.

- 1–999 – Tank locomotives with two driving axles
- 1000–3999 – Tank locomotives with three driving axles (3900 and after for rack railway)
- 4000–4999 – Tank locomotives with four driving axles
- 5000–6999 – Tender locomotives with two driving axles
- 7000–8999 – Tender locomotives with three driving axles
- 9000–9999 – Tender locomotives with four and over driving axles

Numbers within a class were serial in principle. When the number overflowed (as in Classes 8620, 9600 and 9900), one digit was added to precede the four digits to make the numbers five digit. Class 18900 (later reclassified as Class C51) was exceptionally five digit from the beginning.

This numbering and classification rule survived the revision in 1928. Non-standard locomotives that joined the national railways by means of purchase of railway companies were numbered in accordance with this rule even after 1928. Locomotives numbered and classified under this rule includes the locomotives used until very last days of JNR steam locomotives in the 1970s.

=== 1928 numbering system ===
Because the 1909 method was about to overflow, a new system of numbering and classification came into effect on October 1, 1928. Except for Classes 18900, 8200 and 9900 being reclassified as C51, C52 and D50 respectively, existing locomotives were not reclassified or renumbered. After this revision, steam locomotives were classified and numbered with a Latin letter and numerals.

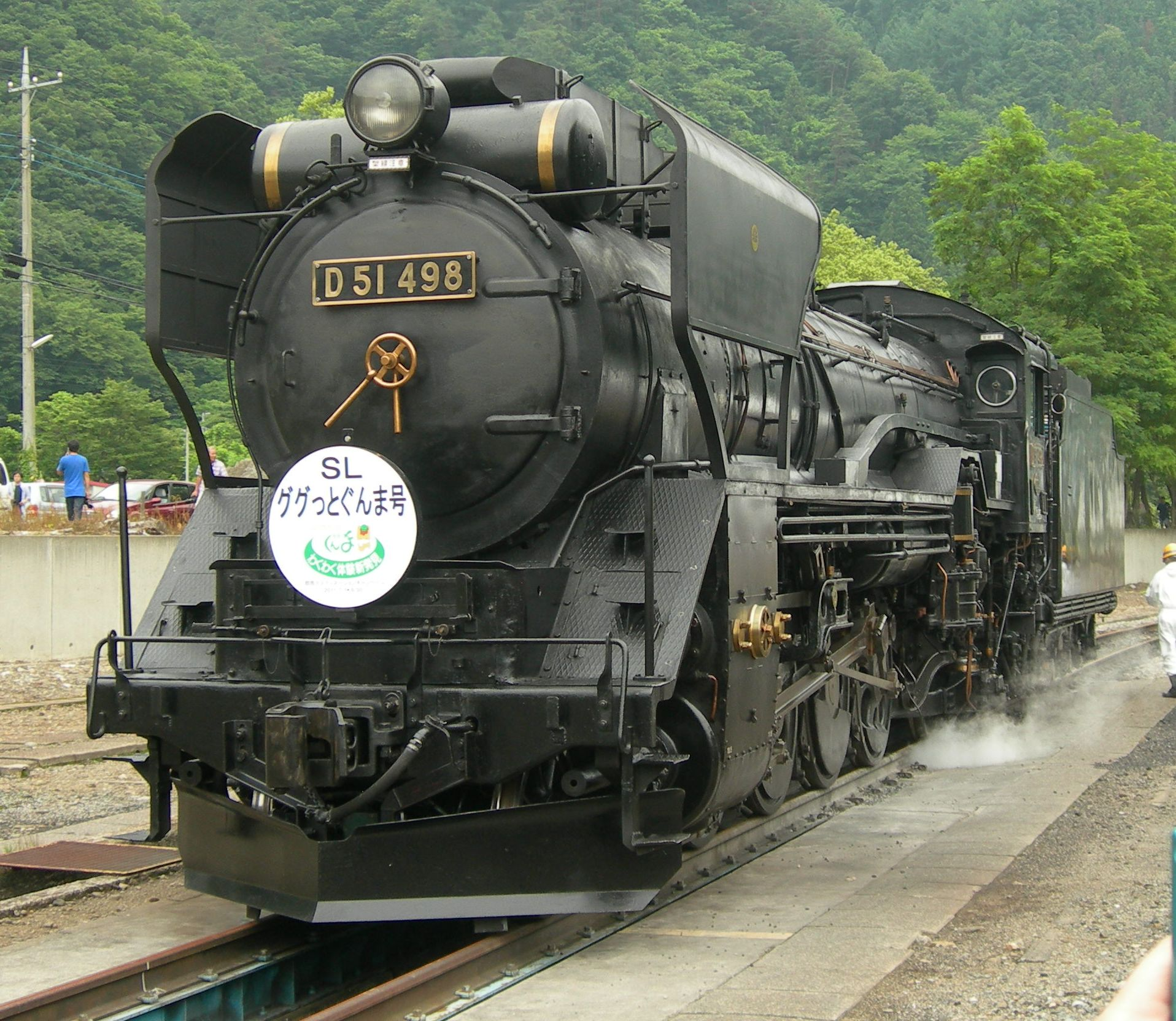
Steam locomotive number D51 498 of Class D51

Example
D51 498

D	51	498
Number of driving axles	Class	Running number

Unlike electric and diesel locomotives, steam locomotive classifications do not include an indication of the type of power source (steam) in their class names.

Number of driving axles
A letter indicates the number of driving axles. Number of either leading and trailing axles or axles of tenders is disregarded.
- 2 axles – B
- 3 axles – C
- 4 axles – D
- 5 axles – E

Class
Together with the letter representing the number of driving axles, a two-digit numeral following the letter indicates a class. The number distinguishes tank locomotives and tender locomotives.
- 10–49 – Tank locomotives
- 50–99 – Tender locomotives

According to this numbering method, D51 498 means locomotive number 498 of Class D51, which is a class of tender locomotives with four driving axles.

== Electric locomotives ==
=== Pre-1928 numbering system ===
The national railways imported its first electric locomotives in 1912. Like steam locomotives of that period, electric locomotives were numbered with four or five digit numerals. Classes were represented by their earliest numbers, last digit being "0".

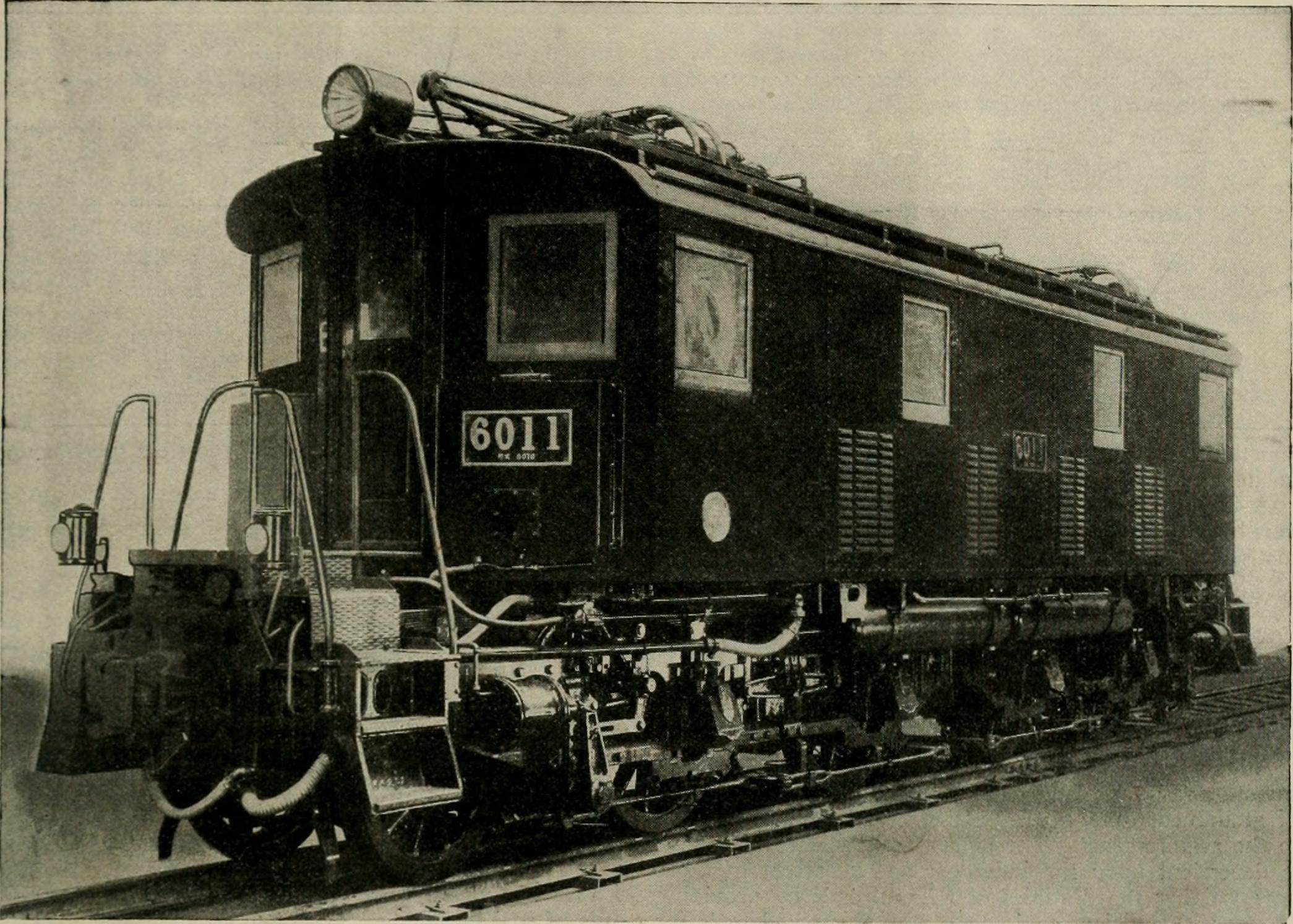
JGR Class 6010 (later ED53) electric locomotive number 6011 built by Baldwin and Westinghouse for the Tōkaidō Main Line

The table below lists all classes of the electric locomotives identified under this method.

Use	Main line													Rack railway		
Class	1000	1010	1020	1030	1040	1060	1070	6000		6010	7000	8000	8010	10000	10020	10040
Year built	1922	1923	1923	1924	1923	1926	1926	1925	1923	1926	1926	1923	1926	1911	1919	1926
Number built	2	2	2	2	17	4	3	3	6	6	2	8	2	12	14	2
Renumbered in 1928	ED10	ED11	ED12	ED13	ED50	ED14	ED15	ED51	ED52	ED53	ED54	EF50	EF51	EC40	ED40	ED41

=== 1928 numbering system ===
A new system of numbering and classification came into effect in 1928. Originally, electric locomotives were classified by maximum speeds. High-speed locomotives were for passenger trains and low-speed locomotives were for freight trains. Later, the system was revised to distinguish the types of electricity when AC and AC/DC locomotives were introduced.

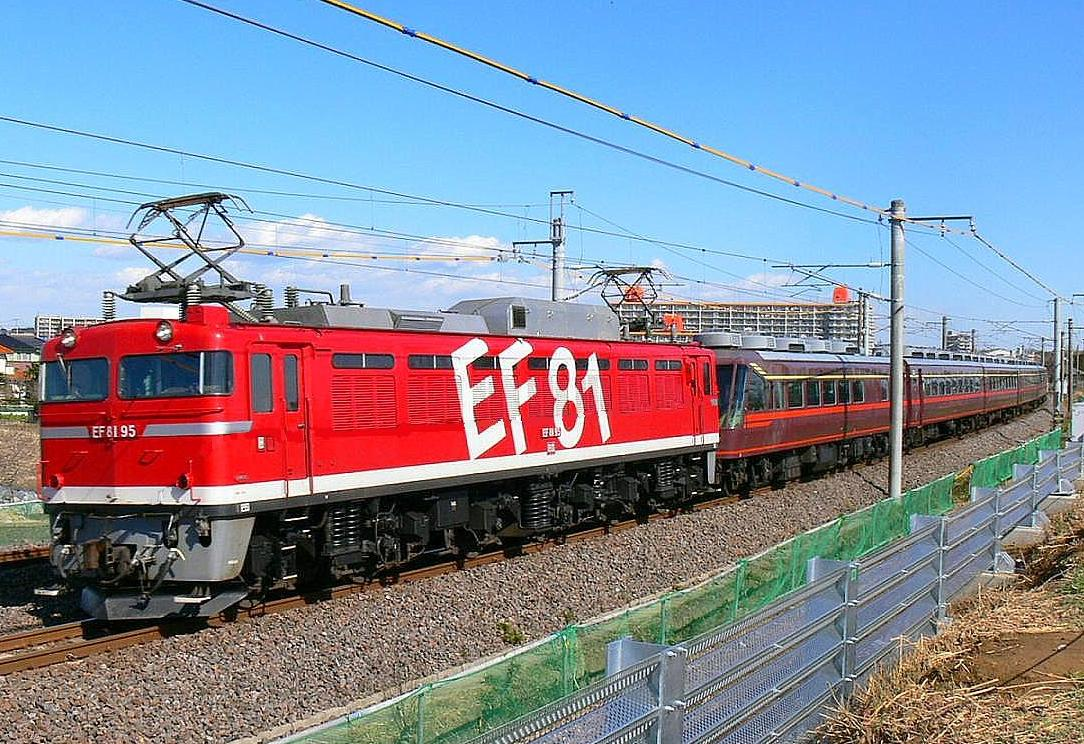
Electric locomotive number EF81 95 of Class EF81

Example
EF81 95

E	F	81	95
Electric	Number of driving axles	Class	Running number

E
All classes of electric locomotives begin with the letter "E" for "electric".

Number of driving axles
A letter indicates the number of driving axles. Unpowered axles are disregarded.

- 2 axles – B
- 3 axles – C
- 4 axles – D
- 6 axles – F
- 8 axles – H

Class
Together with the letter "E" and the letter representing the number of driving axles, a two-digit numeral following the letters indicates a class. Originally, the number distinguished the three types of locomotives.
- 10–39 - Locomotives with maximum speed 85 km/h or less
- 40–49 - Locomotives for rack railway
- 50–99 - Locomotives with maximum speed exceeding 85 km/h

As a result of a revision, as of 1987, the rule was as follows.
- 10–29 - DC locomotives with maximum speed 85 km/h or less
- 30–39 - AC/DC locomotives with maximum speed 85 km/h or less
- 40–49 - AC locomotives with maximum speed 85 km/h or less
- 50–69 - DC locomotives with maximum speed exceeding 85 km/h
- 70–79 - AC locomotives with maximum speed exceeding 85 km/h
- 80–89 - AC/DC locomotives with maximum speed exceeding 85 km/h
- 90–99 - prototypes

Running number
In principle, running numbers begin with 1. However, numbers may be skipped to create subclasses, such as Class EF65 1000 or Class ED75 700.

According to this numbering method, EF81 95 means locomotive number 95 of Class EF81, which is a class of AC/DC locomotive with six driving axles and maximum speed exceeding 85 km/h.

=== JR Freight ===
Out of seven Japan Railways Group (JR Group) companies established in 1987, only Japan Freight Railway Company (JR Freight) has built new electric locomotives. Initially JR Freight continued to build locomotives originally designed by JNR with minor modifications. However, in 1990, it created the new class of EF200, adopting a new classification system with three-digit class names. This system was also later adopted by East Japan Railway Company (JR East) when it introduced its version of the Class EF510 in 2010.

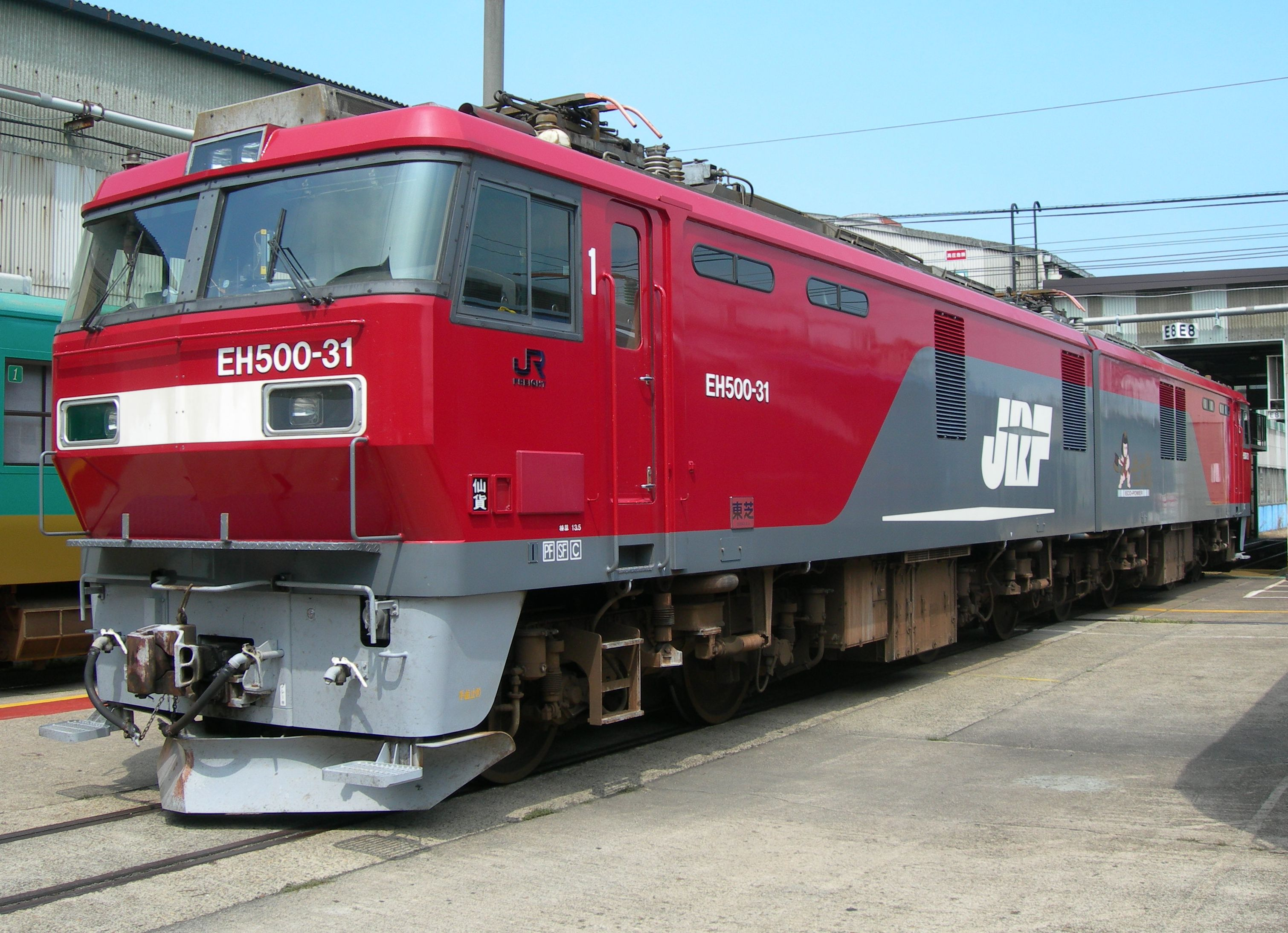
Electric locomotive number EH500-31 of Class EH500

Example
EH500-31

E	H	500	-	31
Electric	Number of driving axles	Class		Running number

Usage of Roman letters is the same as the 1928 rule. A hyphen is placed between the class number and running number.

Class
Three digits of numerals are used to indicate classes. The classification by the maximum speed was replaced by the classification by the types of motors.
- 100–199 - DC locomotives with DC motors
- 200–299 - DC locomotives with AC motors
- 300–399 - Other DC locomotives
- 400–499 - AC/DC locomotives with DC motors
- 500–599 - AC/DC locomotives with AC motors
- 600–699 - Other AC/DC locomotives
- 700–799 - AC locomotives with DC motors
- 800–899 - AC locomotives with AC motors
- 900–999 - Other AC locomotives

According to this numbering method, EH500-31 means locomotive number 31 of Class EH500, which is a class of AC/DC locomotive with eight driving axles and AC motors.

== Diesel locomotives ==
=== JNR ===
The first diesel locomotives of the Japanese Government Railways were two classes of German-made locomotives, the diesel-electric Class DC11 in 1929 and the diesel-mechanical DC10 in 1930. The Ministry of Railways numbered them following a similar scheme to that used for steam and electric locomotives. The Japanese National Railways continued this method.

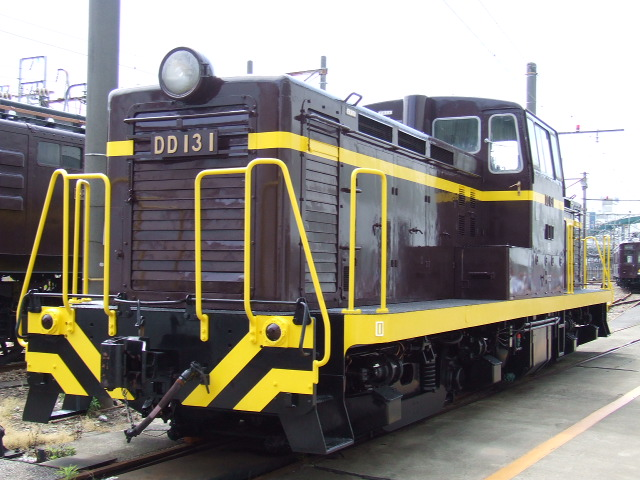
Diesel locomotive number DD13 1 of Class DD13

Example
DD13 1

D	D	13	1
Diesel locomotive	Number of driving axles	Class	Running number

D
All classes of diesel locomotives begin with the letter "D" for "Diesel".

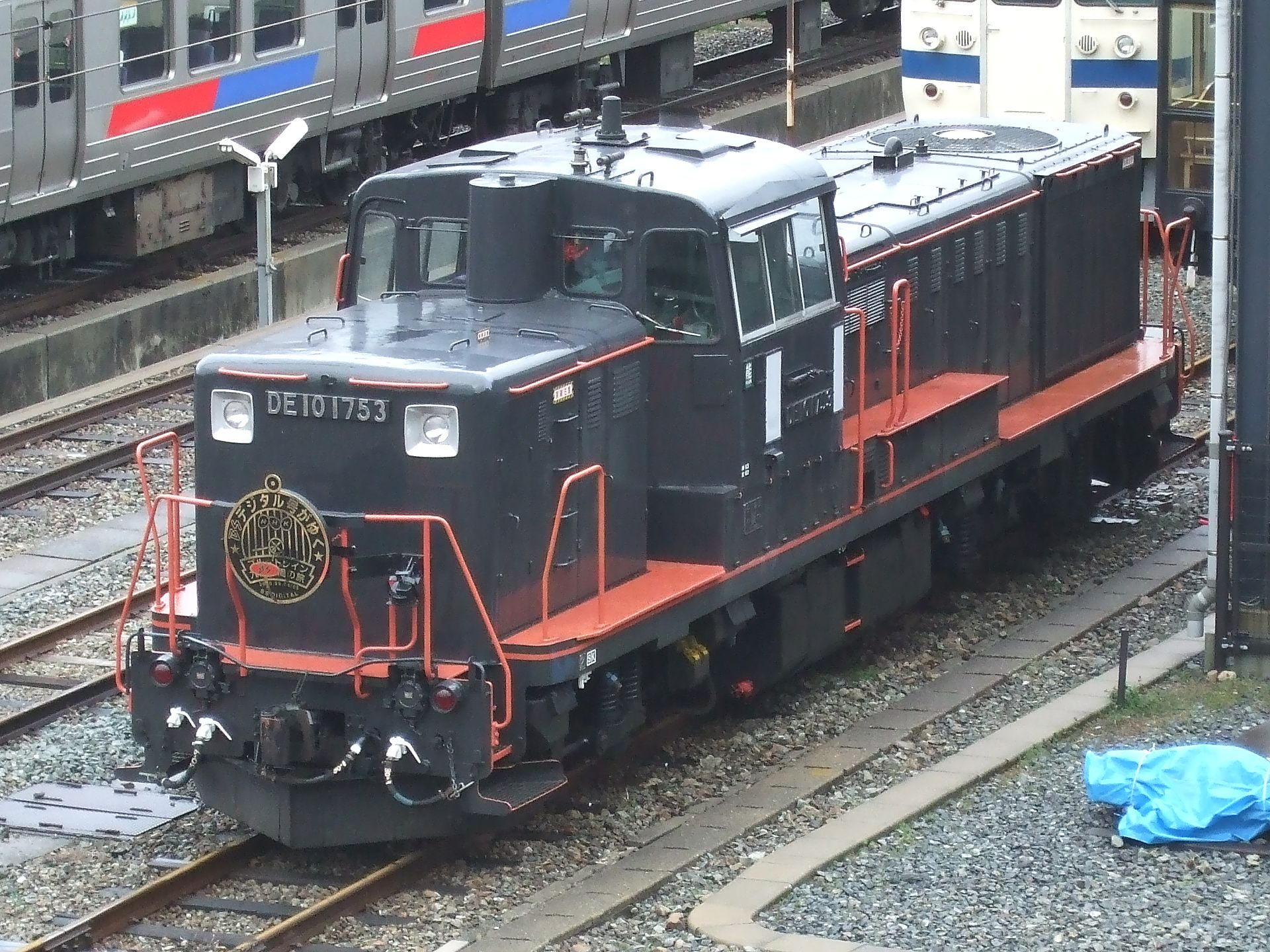
JR Kyushu DL DE10 1753

Number of driving axles
A letter indicates the number of driving axles. Unpowered axles are disregarded.
- 3 axles – C
- 4 axles – D
- 5 axles – E
- 6 axles – F

Class
Together with the letter "D" and the letter representing the number of driving axles, a two-digit numeral following the letters indicates a class. The number distinguishes the locomotives by the maximum speeds.
- 10–39 - Locomotives with maximum speed 85 km/h or less
- 40–49 - Prototypes
- 50–89 - Locomotives with maximum speed exceeding 85 km/h
- 90–99 - Prototypes

Running number
Same as for electric locomotives.

According to this numbering method, DD13 1 means locomotive number 1 of Class DD13, which is a class of diesel locomotive with four driving axles and maximum speed 85 km/h or less.

=== JR Freight ===
After the privatization of JNR in 1987, two Japan Railways Group (JR Group) companies created new classes of diesel locomotives. East Japan Railway Company (JR East) classified its new class as DD19, using the JNR classification system, as it was only a rebuild of the Class DD17, which was built by JNR. On the other hand, Japan Freight Railway Company (JR Freight) built completely new diesel locomotives, which were classified using a new system with three-digit class names.

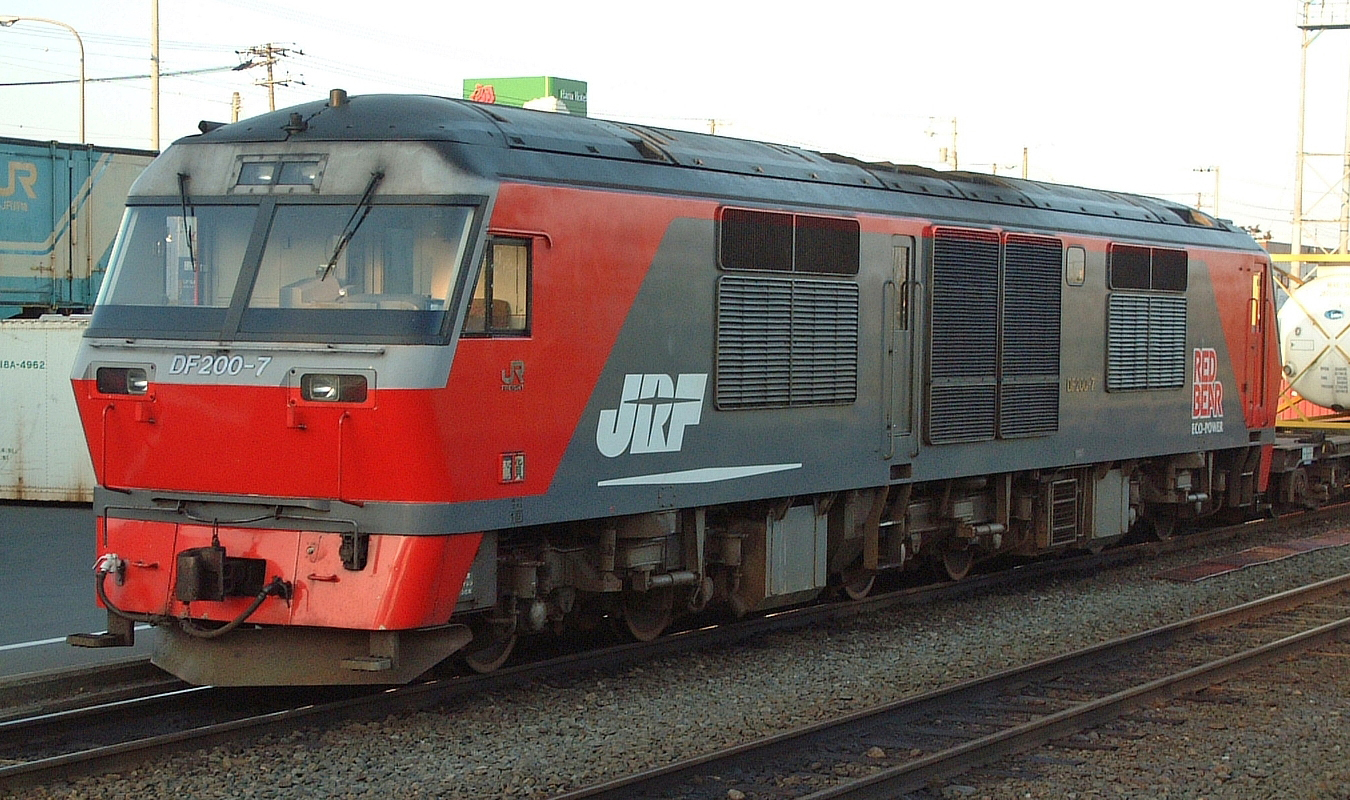
Diesel locomotive number DF200-7 of Class DF200

Example
DF200-7

D	F	200	-	7
Diesel locomotive	Number of driving axles	Class		Running number

Usage of Roman letters is the same as for JNR usage. A hyphen is placed between the class number and running number.

Class
Three digits of numerals are used to indicate classes. The classification by the maximum speed was replaced by the classification by the forms of power transmission and types of electric motors in case of diesel-electric locomotives.

- 100–199 - Diesel-electric locomotives with DC motors
- 200–299 - Diesel-electric locomotives with AC motors
- 300–399 - Other diesel-electric locomotives
- 500–799 - Diesel-hydraulic locomotives

According to this numbering method, DF200-7 means locomotive number 7 of Class DF200, which is a class of diesel-electric locomotive with six driving axles and AC electric motors.

=== Shinkansen ===
Diesel locomotives used on the Shinkansen system (for track maintenance and depot use) are numbered with three-digit class names followed by a serial number connected with a hyphen. There have been two classes of diesel locomotives for shinkansen use: 911 and 912.

In the uniform classification system for Shinkansen rolling stock, the first digit 9 is assigned for cars and locomotives for departmental use. In this 9XX group, the second digit 1 is used for diesel locomotives.

== Hybrid locomotives ==
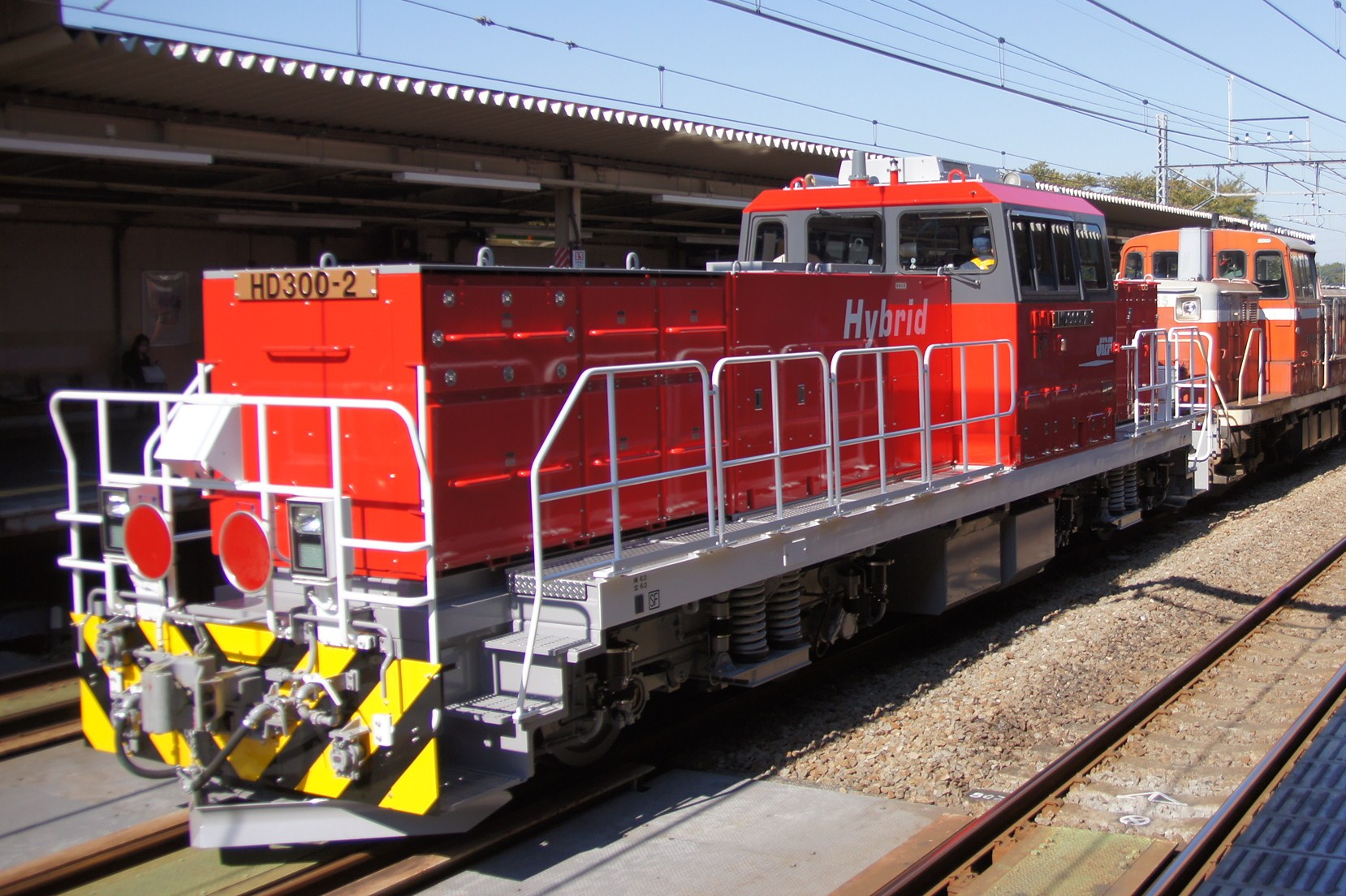
Class HD300 hybrid locomotive number HD300-2

In 2010, JR Freight classified its first diesel-battery hybrid locomotive HD300. The class name HD300 was explained as follows.

- H - hybrid locomotive
- D - number of driving axles being four
- 300 - type of main motor being synchronous motor
